= Mitcham, Victoria =

Mitcham
- Suburb
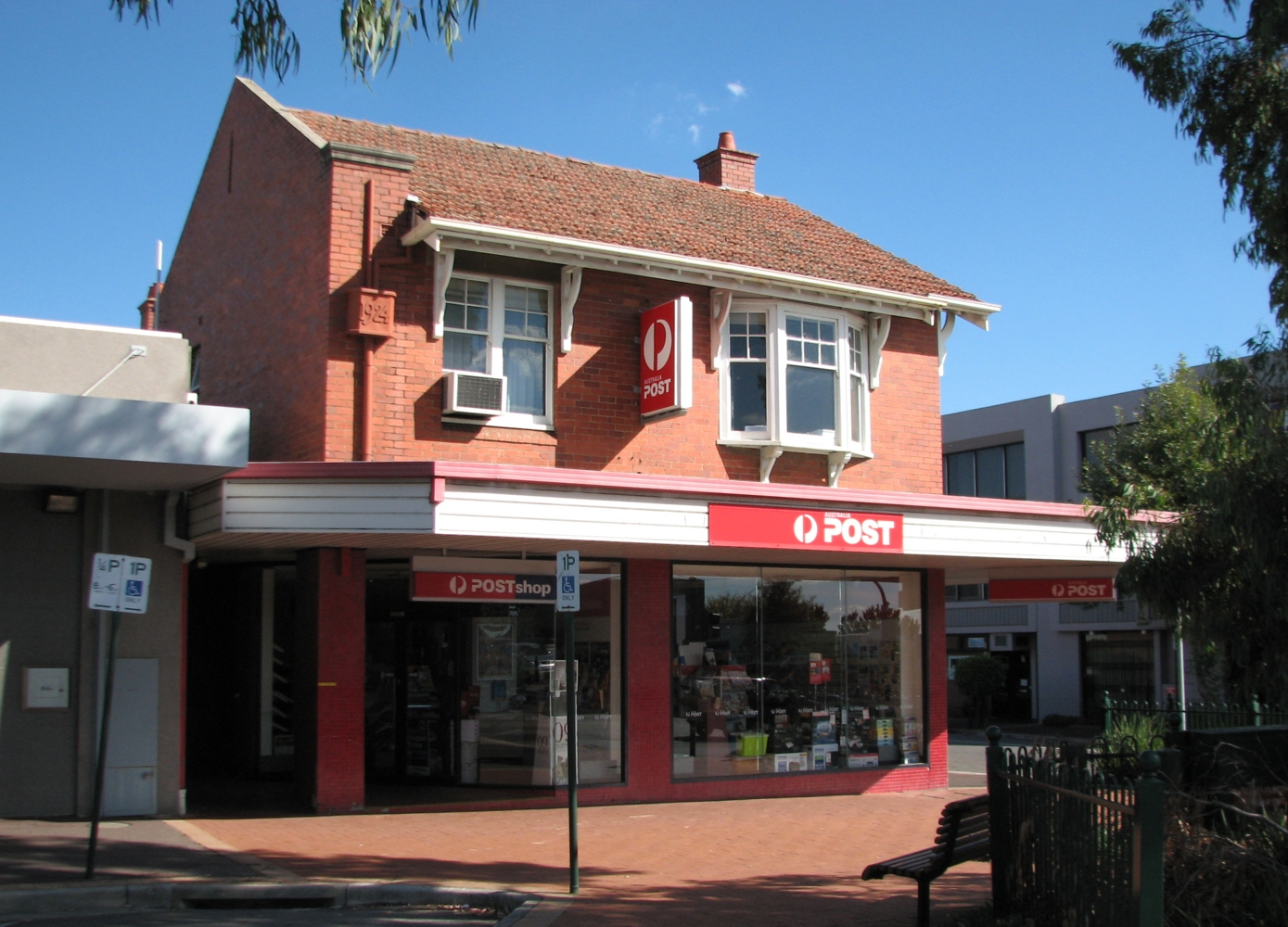
- Former Mitcham Post Office

- Interactive map of Mitcham
- Coordinates: 37.818°S 145.197°E
- Country: Australia
- State: Victoria
- City: Melbourne
- LGA: City of Whitehorse
- Location: 20 km (12 mi) from Melbourne
- Established: 1860s

Government
  - State electorate: Ringwood
  - Federal division: Deakin

Area
  - Total: 6.8 km^{2} (2.6 sq mi)

Population
  - Total: 16,795 (2021 census)
  - Density: 2,470/km^{2} (6,400/sq mi)
- Postcode: 3132
Suburbs around Mitcham
Donvale	Donvale	Ringwood North
Nunawading	Mitcham	Ringwood
Forest Hill	Vermont	Ringwood

Mitcham (/ˈmɪtʃəm/ MITCH-əm) is an eastern suburb of Melbourne, Victoria, Australia. It is located approximately 20 kilometres (12 mi) east from Melbourne's city centre, within the City of Whitehorse local government area. Mitcham had a population of 16,795 at the 2021 census.

== History ==
Mitcham was named after Mitcham Grove, a farm property that was owned by William Slater, who grew roses and herbs for perfumes and remedies. From its Colonial settlement in the 1860s, the Mitcham area was generally used for orchards, brickmaking and pottery.

The Mitcham Post Office opened on 1 June 1884; the Heatherdale Post Office opened in 1948 and closed in 1971; and the Mitcham North Post Office opened in 1960.

Since the 1950s post-war expansion, Mitcham became a suburban area.

== Demographics ==
In the 2021 census the population of Mitcham was 16,795, approximately 51.6% female and 48.4% male.

The median/average age of the people in Mitcham is 39 years of age.

Nearly two-thirds (64.2%) of people living in the suburb of Mitcham were born in Australia. The other top responses for country of birth were 7.9% China, 2.9% India, 2.3% England, 2.3% Malaysia and 1.3% Hong Kong.

Two-thirds (65.7%) of people living in Mitcham speak English only. The other top languages spoken are Mandarin 10.5%, Cantonese 4.5%, Vietnamese 1.1%, Italian 1.1% and Persian (Excluding Dari) 1.1%.

The religious makeup of Mitcham is 45.7% no religion, 17.1% Catholic, Anglican 5.9%, 4.1% not stated, and Non-defined Christian 3.7%.

== Facilities ==
The main shopping precinct is centred on the intersection of Whitehorse Road and Mitcham Road and features a supermarket, cafes, fast food outlets and specialty shops.

Mitcham also has a number of parks and reserves, including:

- Antonio Park – a 7-hectare (17-acre) park that includes a playground, walking trails, remnant bushland, a BBQ area and bird watching opportunities. The park is named after the Antonio family who were first associated with the land in 1892. The site of their original weekend shack is now part of the Antonio Park Primary School grounds. In the early 1900s the family bought what is now the main body of the park and built a permanent home in Deep Creek Road. Remnants of the garden are still present in the formal part of the Park. The family gifted the land to the former Nunawading Council in 1955, but members of the family lived there until 1963. The northern section of the park, known as the "New Lands" was purchased from Charles Schwerkolt in 1975 to replace the land sold to the Education Department for Antonio Park School.
- Halliday Park – a public garden, which has a war memorial, a large children's playground and is home to Bowls Victoria Premier Division's Mitcham Bowling Club.
- Mitcham Private Hospital
- Schwerkolt Cottage – used to back onto Yarran Dheran via a track along the Mullum Mullum Creek.
- Walker Park – a sports reserve, which is home to Mitcham Cricket Club and Mitcham Football Club.
- Yarran Dheran – a 7.2-hectare (18-acre) bushland park, located on the banks of Mullum Mullum Creek.

== Transport ==
The main north–south roads are Mitcham Road and Heatherdale Road. The main east–west road is Whitehorse Road (Maroondah Highway), which connects with the EastLink tolled freeway, which skirts the northern and eastern boundaries of the suburb.

Mitcham has one railway station; Mitcham, which are on the Belgrave and Lilydale railway lines.

There are a number of bus routes, which link the suburb to surrounding areas. Many of these connect with Mitcham railway station.

The Mullum Mullum Creek Trail runs along the creek, adjacent to Mitcham.

== Attractions ==
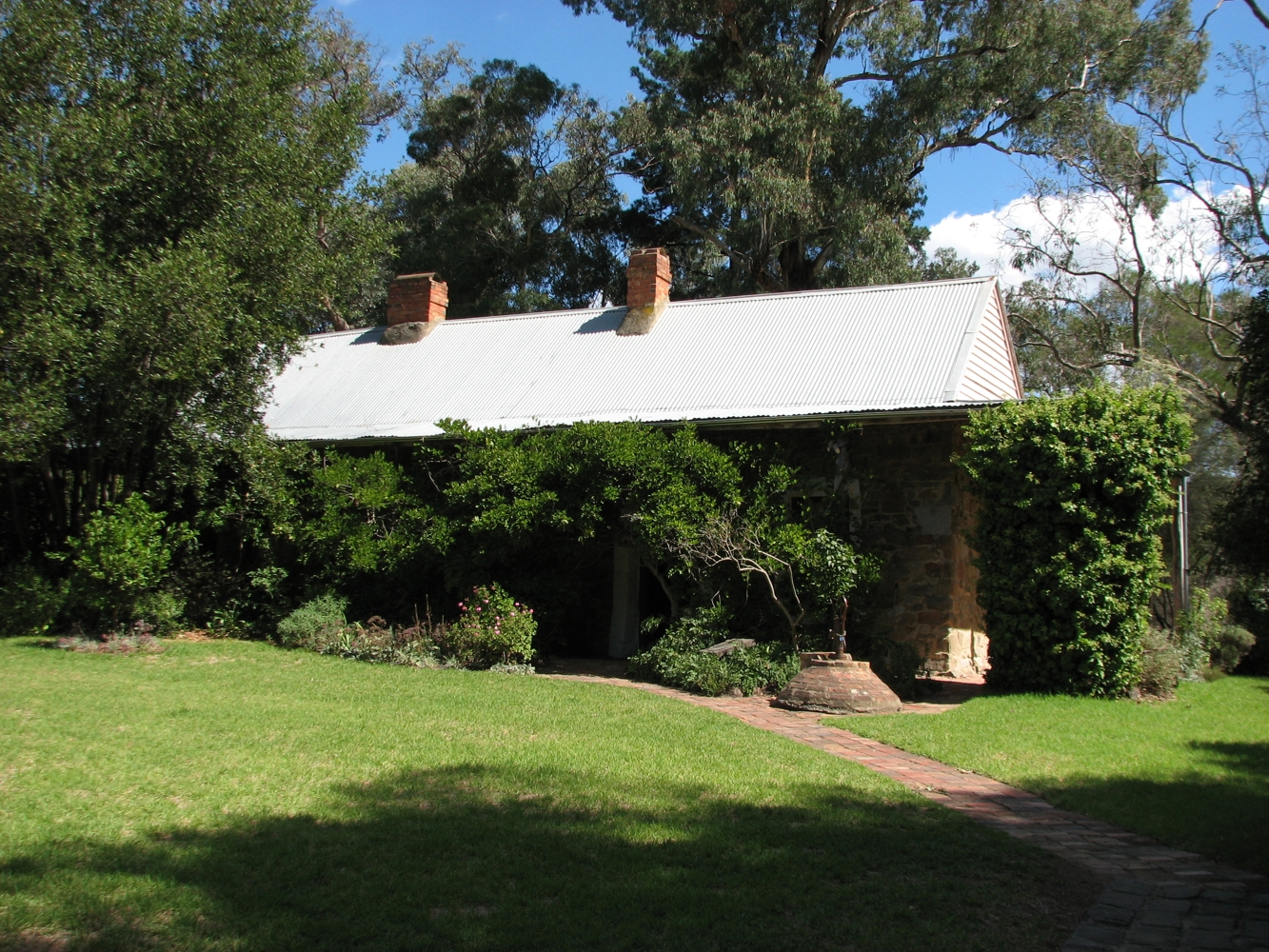
Schwerkolt Cottage

- Schwerkolt Cottage – a pioneer cottage (c. 1880s), near the Yarran Dheran bushland park. The cottage and other buildings are now a local history museum. The cottage is surrounded by 2.25 hectares (5.6 acres) of gardens and bushland. The stone cottage has been restored to its original condition and furnished in a style of the period.

== Heritage listings ==
The following places in Mitcham are listed on the Victorian Heritage Register:

- All Saints Anglican Church, at 18 Edward Street

== Schools ==
- Antonio Park Primary School
- Mitcham Primary School
- Rangeview Primary School
- Mullauna College
- St Johns Catholic Primary School

== Movie history ==
Mitcham was a filming location for the world's first feature film, released in 1906, The Story of the Kelly Gang, which used the suburb in key scenes for the movie.

== Sport ==
The suburb has two Australian Rules football teams: the Mitcham Tigers, competing in the Eastern Football League. and the Mitcham Eagles, who compete in the Saturday Football League. Their home ground is at Heatherdale Reserve.

== Notable people ==
- Alan Barelli – AFL player
- Chris Crewther – politician
- Steve Darmody – rugby league player
- Quincy Hall – singer with Sforzando, poet and writer
- Blake Hardwick – AFL player
- Jessica Humble – soccer player
- Abel Kay – tennis player
- Jim Keogh – AFL player
- Kelvin Moore – AFL player
- Dave O'Neil – comedian
- Bob Pratt – AFL player
- Herb Sawatzky – AFL player
- Felicity Wishart – conservationist and environmental activist
- Jack Zander – AFL player

=== Mitcham Connection ===
Mitcham was the home of comedian Dave O'Neil, The Volvos musicians Heynes Arms & AC Fanta, Quincy Hall, a lead vocalist with Sforzando, poet and writer, actor brothers Brett and Trevor Lewis, playwright Sandra Long, writer Michael McArthur, director James McArthur, sculptor Joanne Mott and abstract artist 'Egghatch'. These and other Mitcham-raised artists collectively became known as the Mitcham Connection. During the 1996 Melbourne International Comedy Festival, Long, the McArthur brothers and Hall, collaborated with several other playwrights and stage directors to produce the extraordinary show To Go at Something Bald-Headed. The show was composed of four plays, including The Harry Blade Show, featuring AC Fanta, Torquil Neilson, and Anthony Rive.

== See also ==
- City of Doncaster and Templestowe – Parts of Mitcham were previously within this former local government area.
- City of Nunawading – Parts of Mitcham were previously within this former local government area.
- Heatherdale - A neighbourhood in Mitcham with its own train station.
