= Sforzando =

Sforzando may refer to:

- Sforzando (musical direction), in musical notation to play a note with sudden, strong emphasis (also known as sforzato)
- Sforzando (band), a band from Melbourne, Australia
- "Sforzando!", a 1996 song by Sebadoh from Harmacy
- "Sforzando", a free SFZ 2.0–compliant sample player for music production.
- Sforzando, a character from the video game Unbeatable.
