= Yarran Dheran =

Nature reserve in Australia

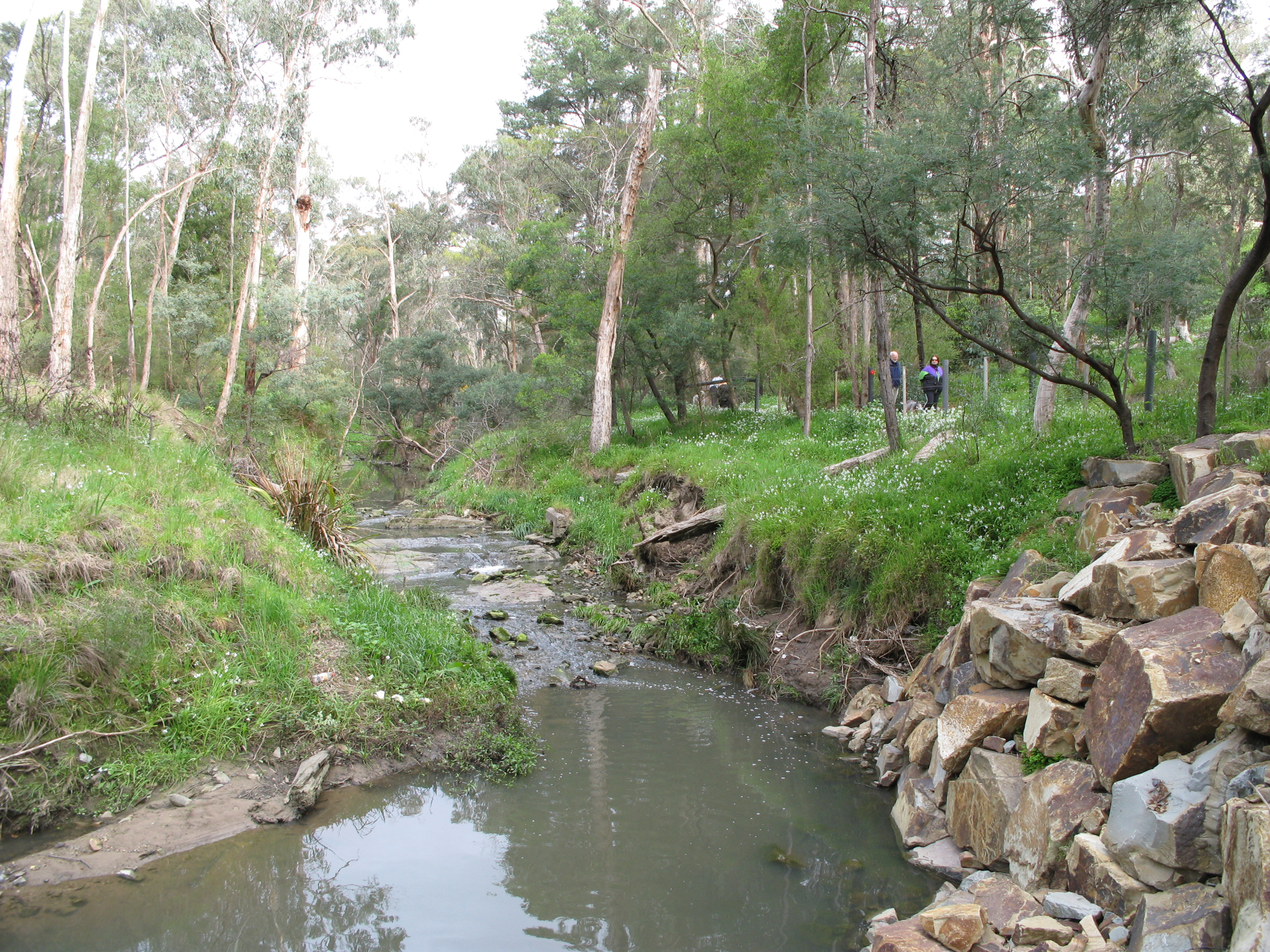
- The Mullum Mullum Creek running through Yarran Dheran
- Interactive map of Yarran Dheran
- Type: Public park, dogs on lead area
- Location: Melbourne, Australia
- Coordinates: 37°48′27″S 145°12′16″E
- Area: 7.2 hectares (18 acres)
- Operator: City of Whitehorse
- Status: Open
- Paths: Mullum Mullum Creek Trail, unsealed bush paths
- Terrain: Remnant and regenerated riparian bushland
- Water: Mullum Mullum Creek, ponds and various gullies
- Vegetation: Gippsland Plain Bioregion, ecological vegetation class (EVC) Valley Heathy Forest
- Public transit: Car, bus (nearby)
- Landmarks: Mullum Mullum Creek
- Facilities: Information centre, toilets, picnic areas

Yarran Dheran Nature Reserve is a nature reserve and bushland park that forms part of the Mullum Mullum Valley. It is located on the banks of the Mullum Mullum Creek, on the border of Donvale in Melbourne. The reserve spans 7.2 hectares and features a mix of remnant and regenerated bushland, supporting a variety of native wildlife, particularly birds, with 85 species observed. The Mullum Mullum Creek Trail passes through the reserve, which also contains numerous unsealed bush tracks. An information centre, open on Sunday afternoons from 2:00 pm to 4:00 pm (depending on volunteer availability), provides visitor information. The reserve includes a series of ponds that feed into a cascade leading to the creek during wet periods. Amenities include toilets, mown areas for picnics, and seating. Yarran Dheran is a dogs-on-lead reserve.

== History ==
In 1865, August Schwerkolt built a cottage for his family from stones out of the Mullum Mullum Creek about 2 kilometres upstream from what is now Yarran Dheran. A bullock track was cut along the banks of the creek for carting stone which extended as far as the crown land which was set aside for a stone quarry which occupied a large part of the park. In later years, a private contractor and the Nunawading Council worked the quarry until 1963 when the Council operated a tip in the old quarry. The 1962 Melbourne bushfires destroyed part of the natural vegetation and also a pine plantation planted in the 1930s by Mitcham Primary School. In 1967 it was declared that the crown land would be the site for a public park.

Following presentations from the local residents and the Blackburn Tree Preservation Society, the site was chosen for a native plant park and the name Yarran Dheran, roughly meaning Wattle Gully, was chosen. In April 1971, a committee of management was established and over 40,000 trees and shrubs were planted over the following 10 years. In 1973, a landscape designer was appointed to prepare a master plan and two hectares of additional land was purchased, increasing the size of the park to 7.2 hectares. In 1975, major earthworks began, a waterfall and fern gully were completed in 1979 and the information centre in 1980.

The Mullum Mullum Creek area was first designated as a freeway reservation in 1969. When its precise location was identified, local environment groups formed the Mullum Mullum Action Group to oppose, and hopefully to contribute to the planning of the alignment. Community opposition grew over time with extensive support from environmental groups as well as from the three local Councils. The Environmental Effects Statement (June 1998) predicted high impact on areas of conservation value if the freeway was built. In the face of unrest, ongoing controversy and confusion, continued community opposition resulted in a political agreement by the Victorian State Government in 2000 to build two tunnels as part of Eastlink to protect the entire Mullum Mullum Valley, extending from Park Road Donvale to Deep Creek Road in Ringwood.

== Flora and fauna ==
Yarran Dheran falls into the category of ecological vegetation class Valley Heathy Forest. It represents one of the largest remaining patches of dry sclerophyll forest in urban Melbourne, providing a piece of "real bush" only 20 km from the CBD. Eucalyptus include manna gum, yellow box, and narrow-leaved peppermint. Middle storey plants include a wide range of acacias, including golden wattle, which is Australia's floral emblem, as well as sweet bursaria and cherry ballart. Lower storey plants include many wildflowers, native grasses and orchids, including the small grass tree. Purple coral pea is still commonly found. It was once prevalent throughout the surrounding hills, to the extent that they were once known as the purple hills.

85 species of birds have been seen over time in the Mullum Mullum Valley, of which Yarran Dheran forms a part. Some birds are permanent residents, including superb fairywrens, grey fantails, grey butcherbirds, crimson and eastern rosellas, rainbow lorikeets, white-browed scrubwrens, dusky moorhens, and eastern yellow robins. Some are transient visitors, such as the owlet-nightjar. Others are seasonal migrants, including the olive-backed oriole and the fan-tailed cuckoo. This diversity is unusual in an urban reserve and is reflective both of the varied habitat in the Reserve, which includes valley heathy forest, open grassy areas, and wetter areas along the creek and around the ponds, and the Mullum Mullum Creek.

The Mullum Mullum Creek provides a regionally significant wildlife corridor for birds and other wildlife extending to its confluence with the Yarra River at Templestowe. Other wildlife include swamp wallabies, eastern long-necked turtles, lowland copperhead and tiger snakes, and the elusive echidna.
