= P10 =

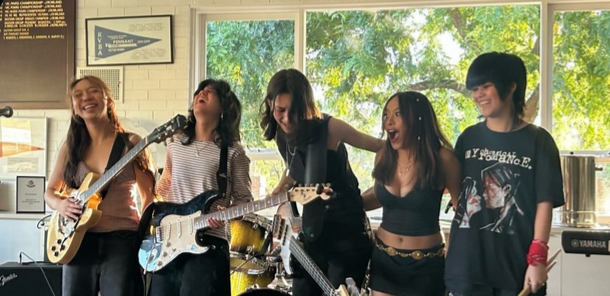
- P10 at Manningham "Village Vibes" Festival, Templestowe. From left to right: Belle Wong, Ella Macmillan, Ari Shea, Lara Mistica, and Leighton Macdonald.

Background information
- Also known as: Portable 10
- Origin: Naarm (Melbourne), Australia
- Genres: Alternative; Indie; Pop; Rock
- Years active: 2025–2026
- Members: Ella Macmillan; Lara Mistica; Belle Wong; Ari Shea; Leighton Macdonald
- Past members: Evie Vamvakaris
- Website: www.instagram.com/portable_10_/

P10 [@portable_10_] is an Australian band formed in Naarm (Melbourne), Victoria (state), in 2025. The band currently consists of lead guitarist Ella Macmillan, lead vocalist Lara Mistica, vocalist and guitarist Belle Wong, bassist Ari Shea and drummer Leighton Macdonald.

The band was formed in high school, with members Ella, Lara, Belle, Leighton and Evie. Ari joined later in 2025. Shortly after, Evie left.

== Band Members ==
Current Members

- Ella Macmillan – guitar, vocals (2025–present)
- Lara Mistica – vocals (2025–present)
- Belle Wong – ∞ (2025–present)
- Ari Shea – bass guitar, backing vocals (2025–present)
- Leighton Macdonald – drums (2025–present)

Former

- Evie Vamvakaris – vocals (2025)
