= Ruffey Lake Park =

Park in Melbourne, Victoria, Australia

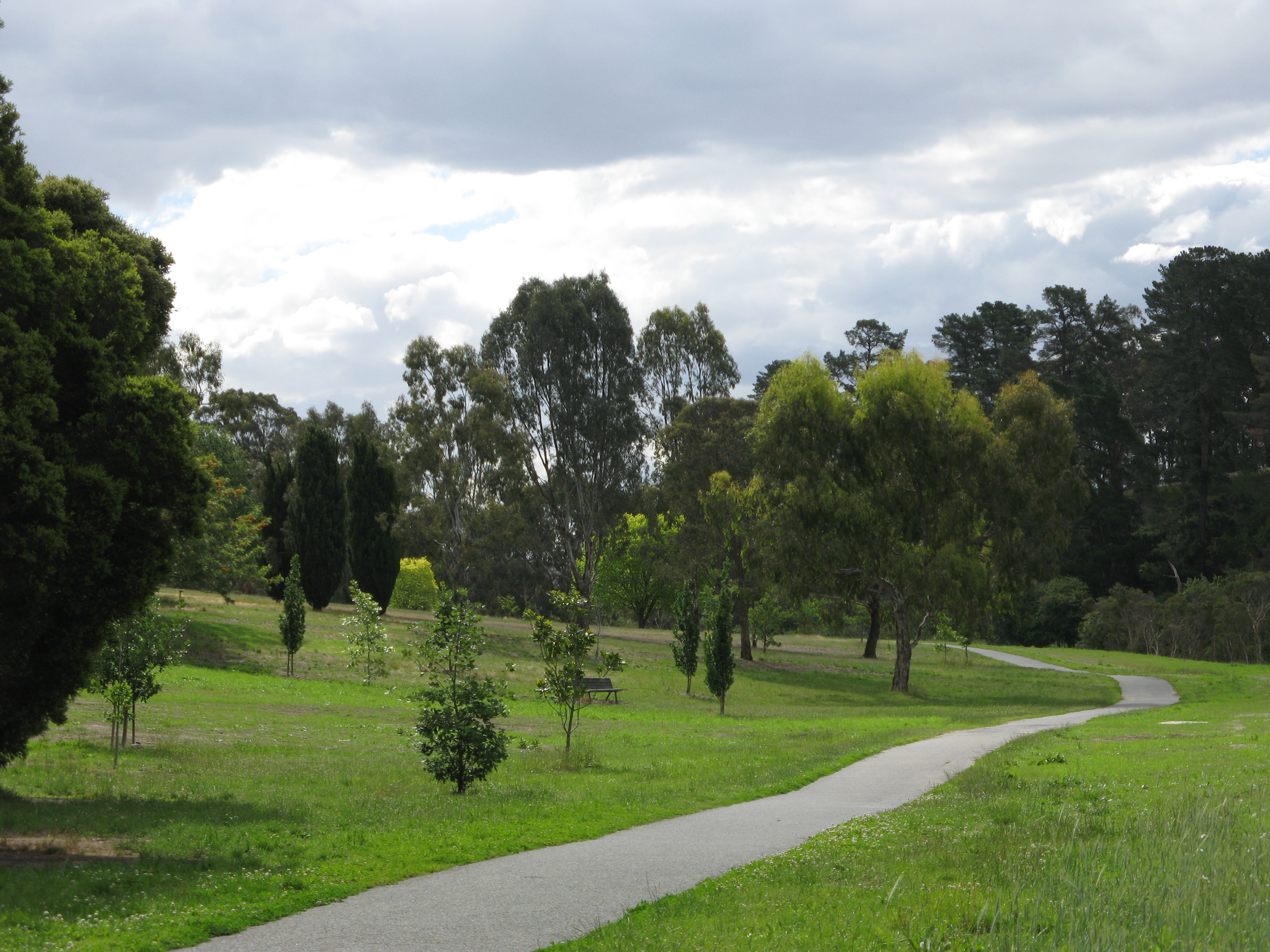
- The south-eastern section of the park, looking north-west

- Location within Melbourne
- Interactive map of Ruffey Lake Park
- Type: Urban park
- Location: Melbourne, Victoria, Australia
- Coordinates: 37°46′32″S 145°08′19″E
- Area: 66 to 68 ha (160 to 170 acres)
- Opened: 1977; 49 years ago
- Etymology: Ruffey Creek
- Operator: City of Manningham
- Paths: Sealed and unsealed
- Terrain: Bushland and hills
- Water: Ruffey Lake
- Vegetation: Australian native; remnant orchards
- Landmarks: Ruffey Creek Trail
- Facilities: Playgrounds; barbecues; toilets
- Website: manningham.vic.gov.au

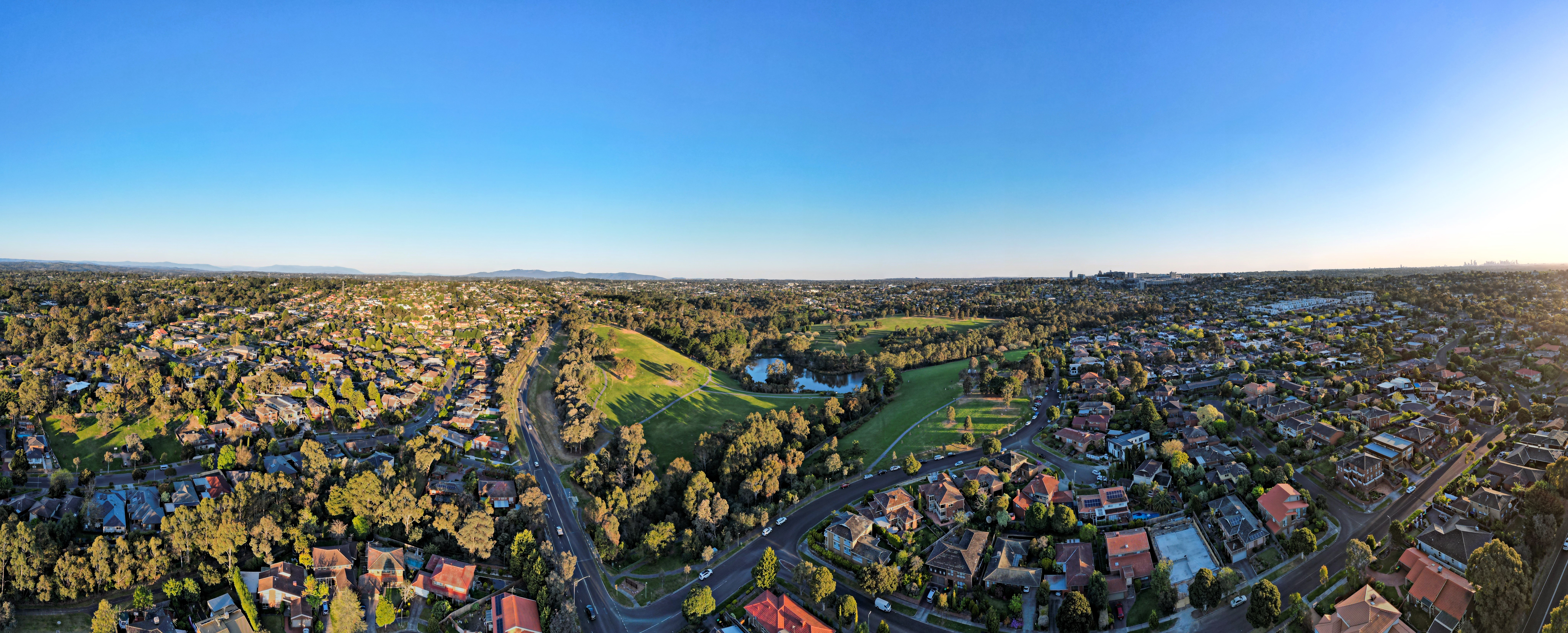
Panorama of the park, 2023

The Ruffey Lake Park is a 66-to-68-hectare (160-to-170-acre) urban park in the City of Manningham, in the north-eastern suburbs of Melbourne, Victoria, Australia. The park is a terminus of the Ruffey Creek Trail.

Established in 1977, the park is located adjacent to Ruffey Creek, a watercourse that runs through the park, that provided water for the surrounding orchards. In 1974, the land was purchased by Manningham Council, with Ruffey Creek dammed creating the eponymous lake. The creek forms a border between Doncaster and Templestowe.

The park is located on the Traditional Lands of the Wurundjeri Woiwurrung people; with a strong connection with the community through the nearby Westerfolds Park, at Templestowe.

== Description ==
The park has a diverse ecology; this includes a riparian strip of native bushland around Ruffey Creek, areas of pine trees planted by early settlers, and pockets of fruit trees remnants. There are three main entrances, Victoria Street, The Boulevard and King Street.

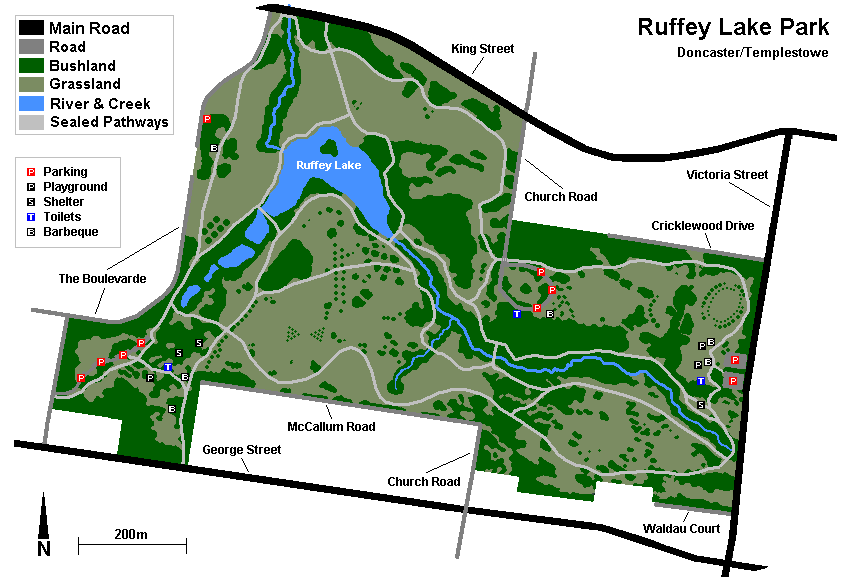
Map of the parklands

=== Victoria St Entrance ===
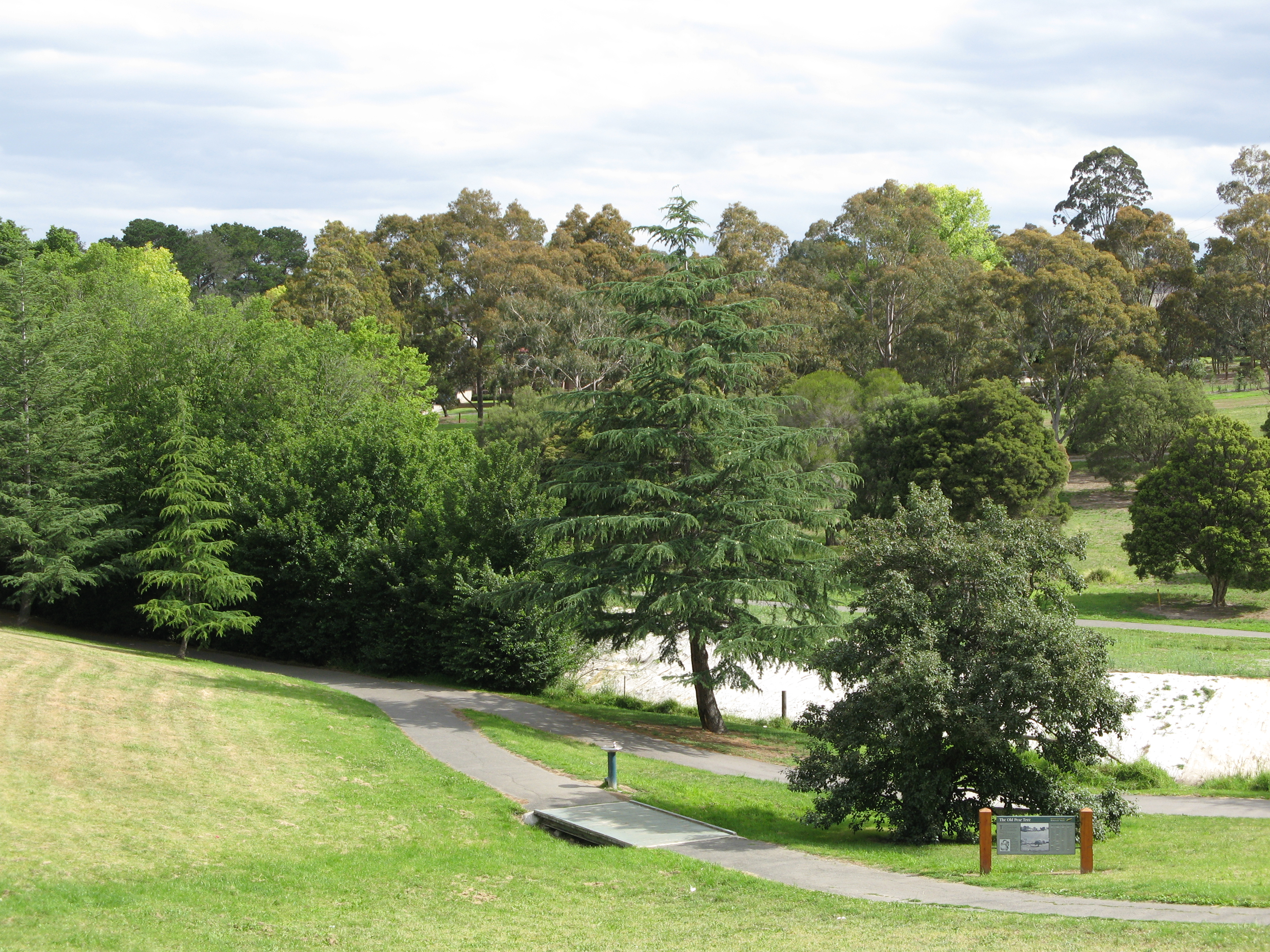
Looking south-west from near the Victoria Street entrance

The Victoria St entrance is the unofficial main entrance to the park. It hosts a three-storey adventure playground with swings, slides, ladders, a sandpit, a flying fox, a four-storey dome with stairs and ladders, and more. There are also barbecues, upgraded (winter 2011) unisex toilets, drinking fountains, maps of the park and shelters with seating. Concrete tiles on pathways details sponsors and donors to the facilities.

=== The Boulevard Entrance ===
The Boulevard entrance is mainly used by local residents. The playground is surrounded by a hilly area and is smaller than Victoria St but is still in good condition. It contains slides, swings, ladders, monkey bars, a flat area to play footy or soccer and more. It has resources such as barbecues, toilets, a map of the park, drinking fountains and an undercover seating area. The playground is sometimes visited by an ice-cream truck. In the summer, the area around this entrance hosts Manningham Carols by Candlelight in December and the Iranian Fire Festival in March.

=== Other facilities ===
The park has three toilet blocks and electric barbecues are distributed throughout. There are three playgrounds in Ruffey Lake Park; near the Boulevard and Victoria St entrances. Facilities have been upgraded, predominantly the playgrounds, especially the Victoria Street adventure playground. There are sealed pathways giving access to almost every area of the park. These are of standard width and in relatively good condition but do not host dividing lines. The north-west area of the park has fewer facilities. During the summer, the park hosts the annual Manningham Carols by Candlelight.

Just to the south of the lake is a hill used by BMX enthusiasts with many small tracks and a range of jumps.

== History ==
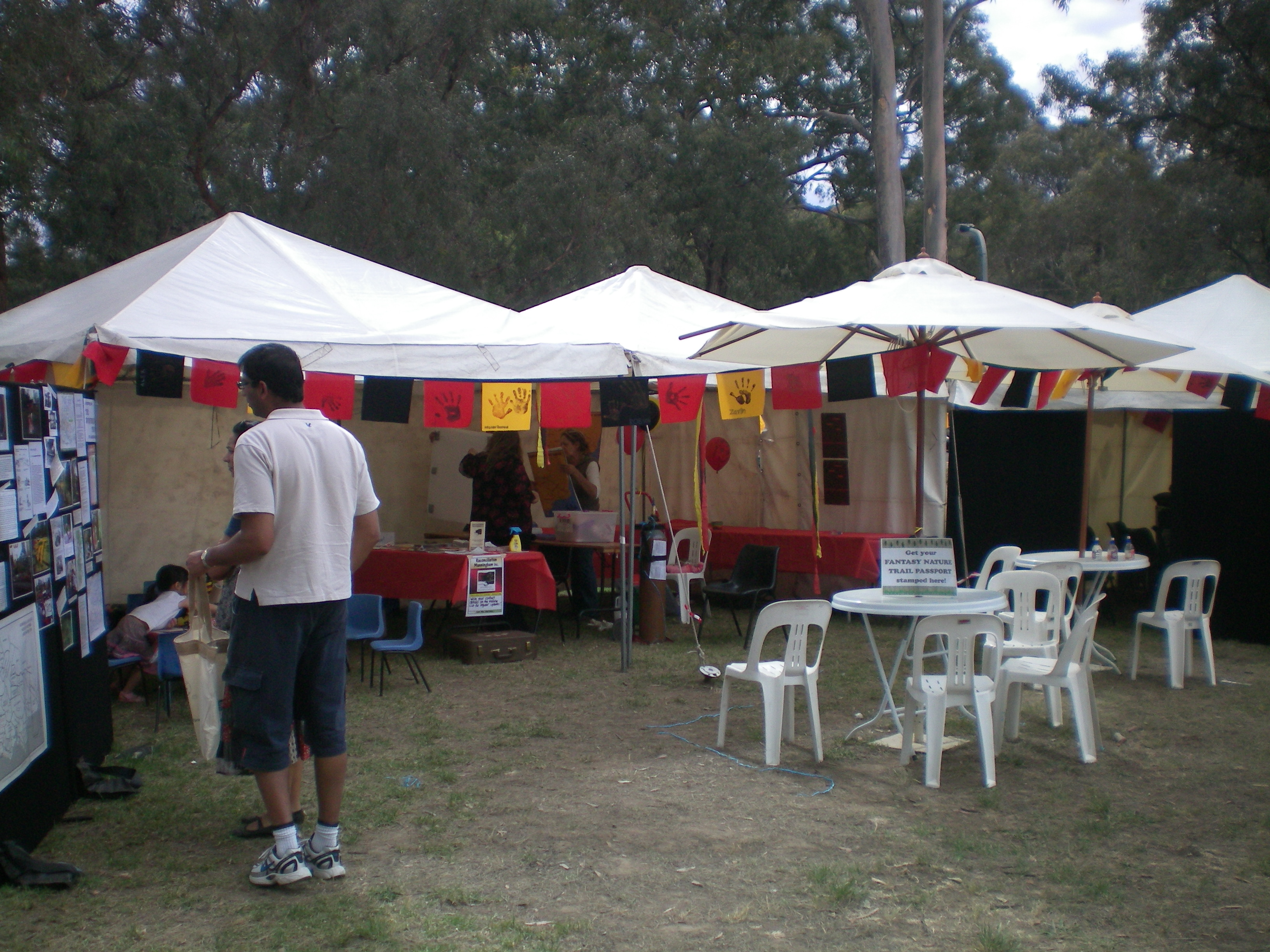
Manningham Spring Festival, 2008

In the 1860s, most of the native bushland was cleared for the sale of firewood and several queries appeared in the area. The land was subsequently cultivated for orchards, initially berries, and then pears, peaches, nectarines, apples, cherries, plums, lemons, quinces and tomatoes. In 1966, the then City of Doncaster & Templestowe purchased land for open space use, called the Doncaster Municipal Gardens and opened as a regional reserve.

Ruffey Creek was dammed in the mid-1990s creating Ruffey Lake. Today, the creek and lake serve as storm water drainage basins, rubbish dropped on the streets regularly flows down the creek and there are waste catchers deployed in the lake itself to catch some of this pollution.

== Gallery ==
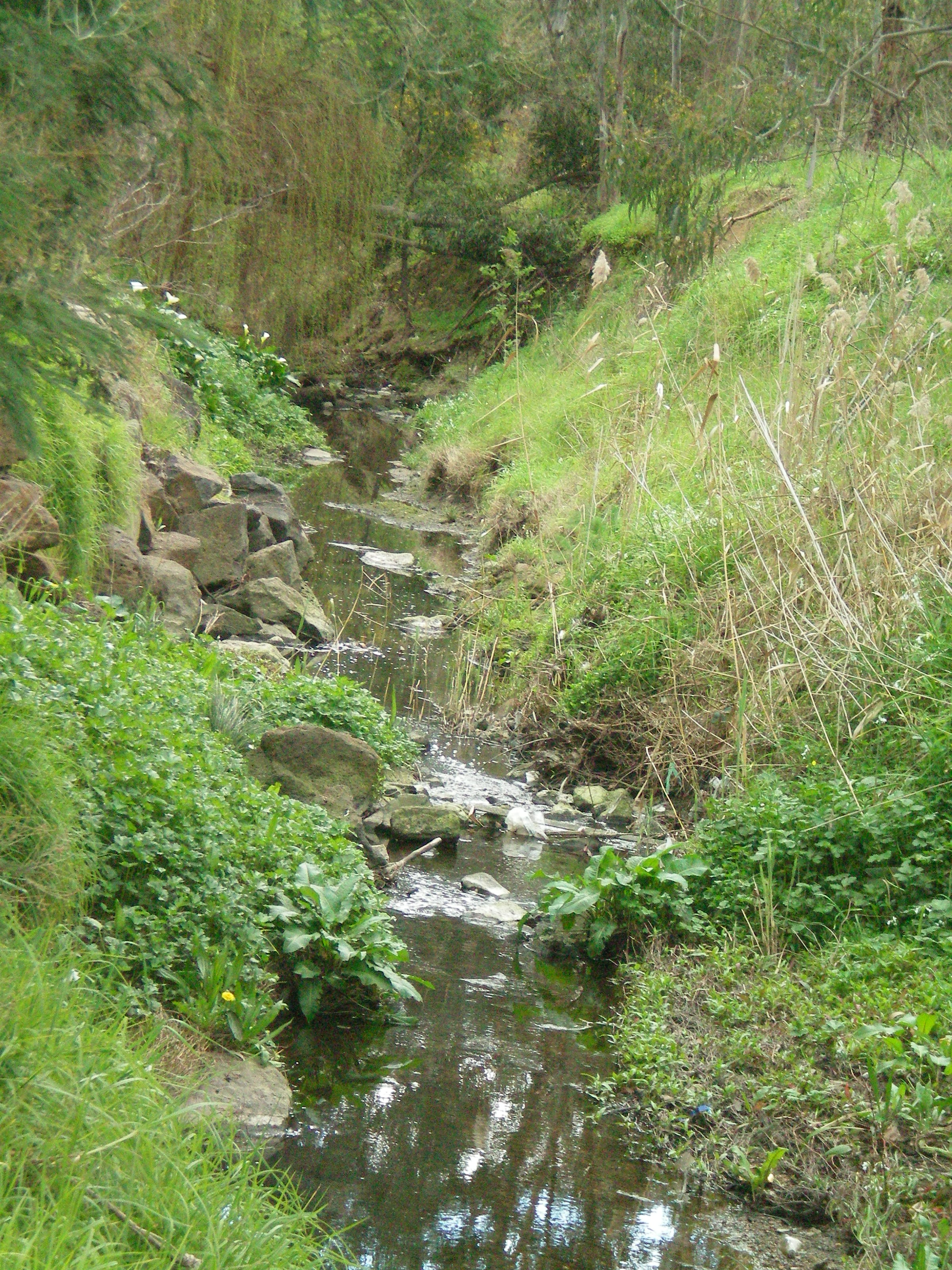
Ruffey Creek, near its source in the Yarra River at Finns Reserve in Templestowe

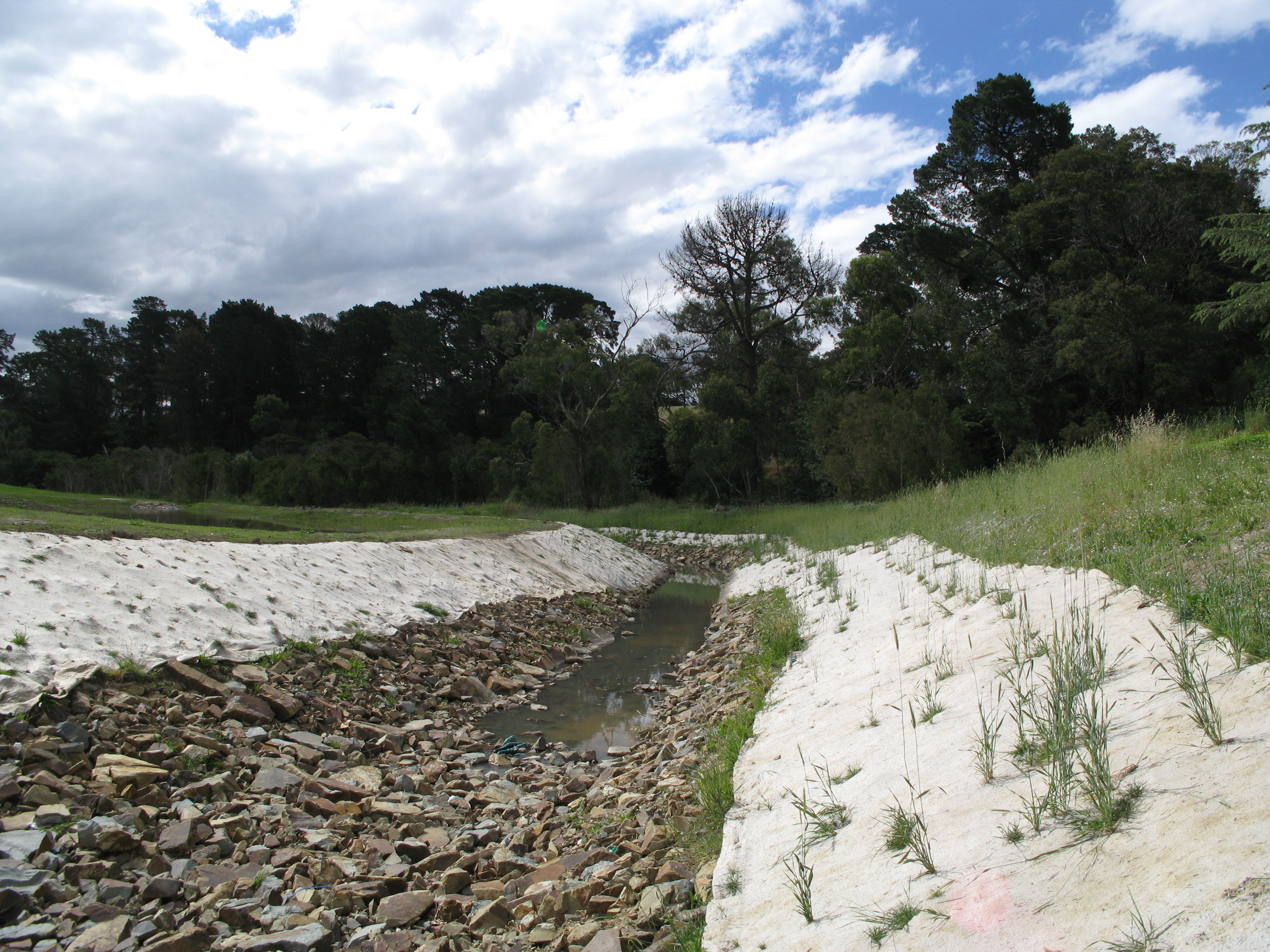
Ruffey Creek vegetation restoration

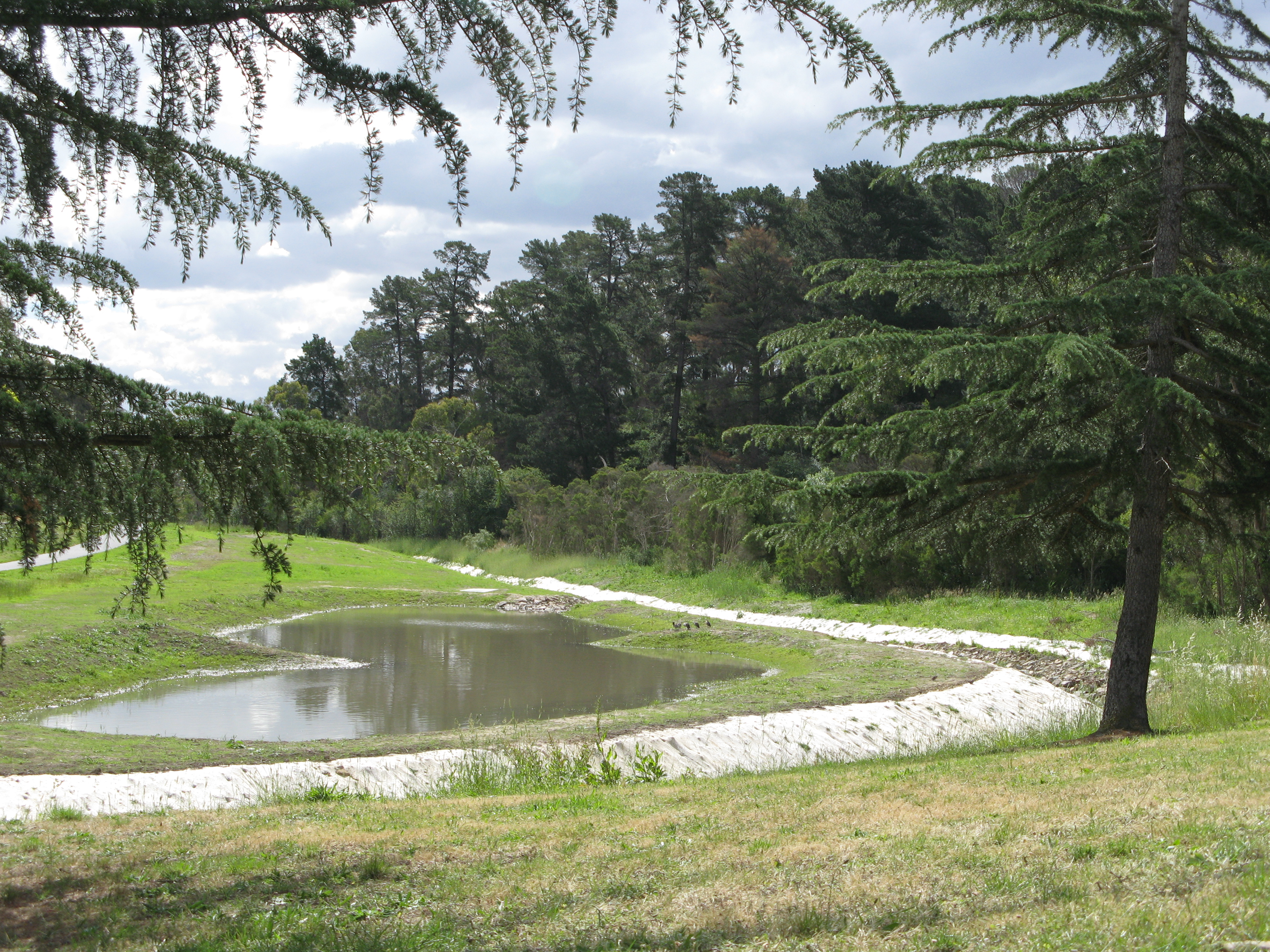
Wetlands restoration

== See also ==
- Parks and gardens of Melbourne
- Ruffey Creek Trail
