= SFZ =

SFZ or sfz may refer to:

- Sforzando, a dynamic marking in music
- Sforzando (band), a Celtic music band from Australia
- SFZ (file format), a plain text file format for instrument data in software synthesizers
- Slovak Football Association
- Sorong Fault Zone, a geological fault line in Western Pacific Ocean
- Star Fox Zero, a video game
- Single-family zoning, an industry term for areas zoned exclusively for single-family homes.
