= Ferny Creek Trail =

Shared-use path for cyclists and pedestrians in Australia

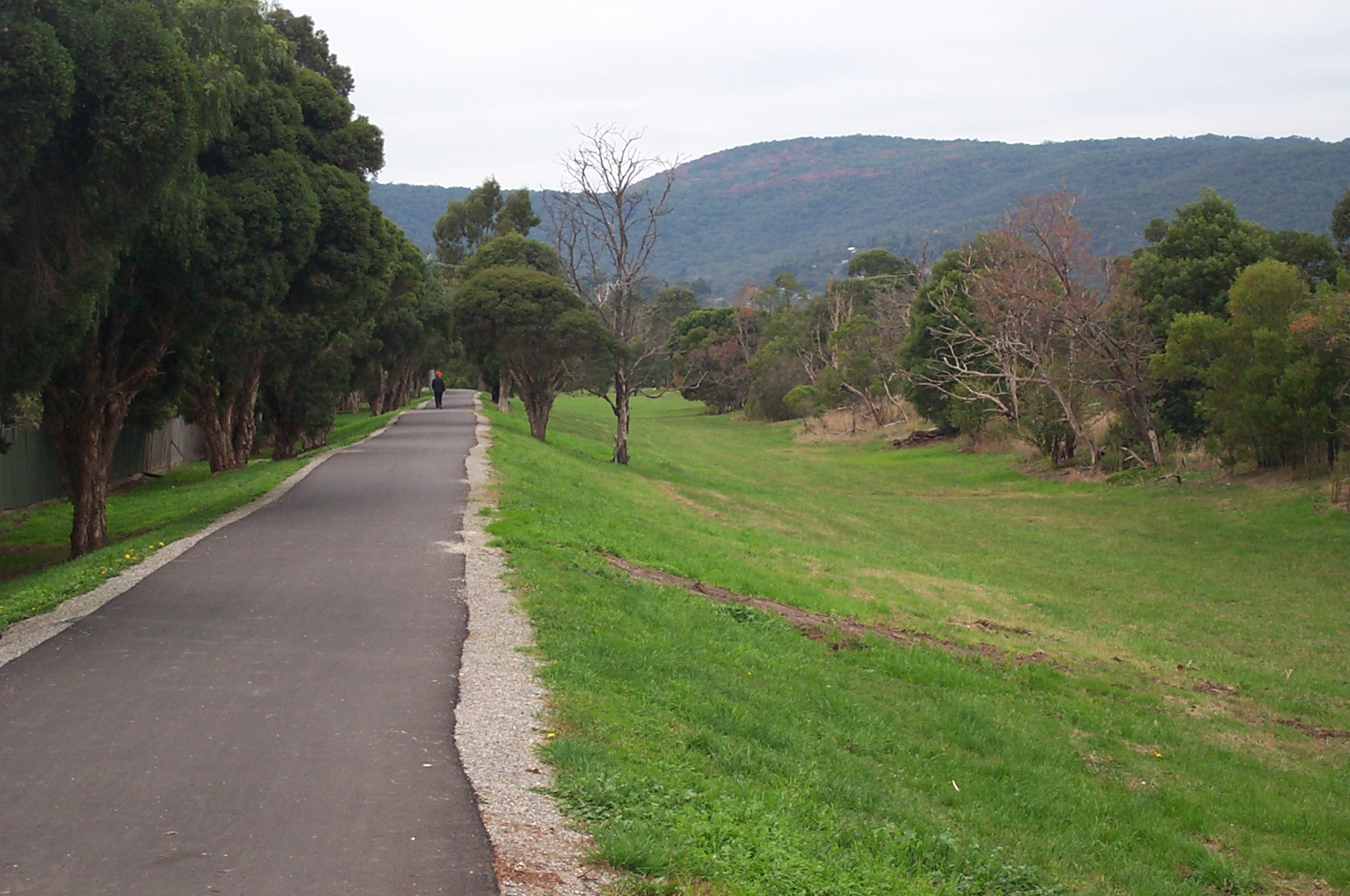
- Ferny Creek Trail in Ferntree Gully
- Length: 8.6km
- Location: Melbourne, Victoria, Australia
- Difficulty: Easy
- Hills: None
- Train: Upper Ferntree Gully Station
- Tram: None

The Ferny Creek Trail is a shared use path for cyclists and pedestrians, which follows Ferny and Corhanwarrabul Creeks through the suburbs of Knoxfield and Ferntree Gully in Melbourne, Victoria, Australia.

Bicycle Victoria is campaigning for a connection between the Dandenong Creek Trail and the western end of the Ferny Creek Trail at Stud Road. The path would have to be extended along Corhanwarrabul Creek beside the Caribbean Gardens. The connection is also as proposed by Parks Victoria and support for the project is ALP policy. An underpass would have to be built as part of the EastLink project.

Ferny and Monbulk creeks combine to become the Corhanwarrabul Creek, 1.2 km east of Stud Road.

== Route ==
The Belgrave Rail Trail runs beside Kings Park along Forest Oak Drive south west of and close to Upper Ferntree Gully Station. Forest Oak Drive turns to the east with a 90 degree bend, at the north end of the park. At the bend go straight ahead for the Ferny Creek trail and for the Belgrave Rail Trail turn to the right and head for the pedestrian lights at Burwood Highway.

Within 100m the trail starts to run parallel to Acacia Road. After the far end of Acacia Road, the trail is straightforward. About 4.7 km from the start is an intersection with a rough track that quickly leads to Scoresby Road. The point is marked by one of the many pieces of art dedicated to Hubert Opperman, that are found in the City of Knox. See also the Oppy Family Fun Ride.

After another 2.1 km, the trail reaches Stud Road.

Turn right (north) and continue on the Stud Road path to Ferntree Gully Road. At Ferntree Gully Road, using the path on the north side of the road, head west to arrive at the EastLink Trail.

== Connections ==
- Connects to the Belgrave Rail Trail in the east.
- At Knox park, one can use a decrepit path along Scoresby Road, that leads to the Blind Creek Trail in the north.
- Connects to EastLink Trail and Dandenong Creek Trail in the west.

West end at 37.902702°S 145.214301°E. East end at 37.893094°S 145.301510°E.
