= Greengully Trail =

Shared use path in Melbourne, Australia

- Length: 2.6 km
- Location: Melbourne, Victoria, Australia
- Difficulty: Easy
- Hills: Minor hill near Heidelberg Warrandyte Rd
- Train: None
- Tram: None

The Greengully Trail is a shared use path for cyclists and pedestrians in the inner eastern suburb of Templestowe in Melbourne, Victoria, Australia.

There is a 400 m road section at the most northerly end of Blackburn Rd.

== Following the Path ==
Starting at Serpells Rd and heading north it's mainly an easy run downhill. Just south of Reynolds Rd the path forks twice in a row. Take the second fork to the left. At Heidelberg-Warrandyte Rd the path traverses round the side of a hill and arrives at a roundabout at the intersection of Heidelberg-Warrandyte Rd and Blackburn Rd.

Back on the road, head north along Blackburn Rd, past the municipal depot on the right. Turn left (west) at Websters Rd. The Post Office depot is on the corner. Being confronted by the hugely steep hill rising up Websters Rd directly ahead, it is comforting to turn right (north), immediately after passing the far end of the Post Office depot, into the Tikalara Park entrance and rejoining the trail. 300 m down the trail the Mullum Mullum Creek Trail is encountered.

== Connections ==
Intersects with the lower Mullum Mullum Creek Trail in the north. The outer end of the Main Yarra Trail can be accessed from continuing north through Tikalara Park. Dead end in the south at Serpells Rd near Blackburn Rd. Travelling 2 km to the south west by road leads to the Ruffey Creek Trail.

North end at 37.746404°S 145.166852°E. South end at 37.767494°S 145.162474°E.
