= Ruffey Creek Trail =

Shared use path in Melbourne, Australia

- Length: About 4.9km
- Location: Melbourne, Victoria, Australia
- Difficulty: Medium
- Hills: Some hilly sections
- Water: At Ruffey Park
- Train: None
- Tram: None

The Ruffey Creek Trail is a shared use path for cyclists and pedestrians, which follows Ruffey Creek in the inner eastern suburbs of Templestowe and Doncaster in Melbourne, Victoria, Australia.

Platypus are known to live in the creek.

== Following the Path ==
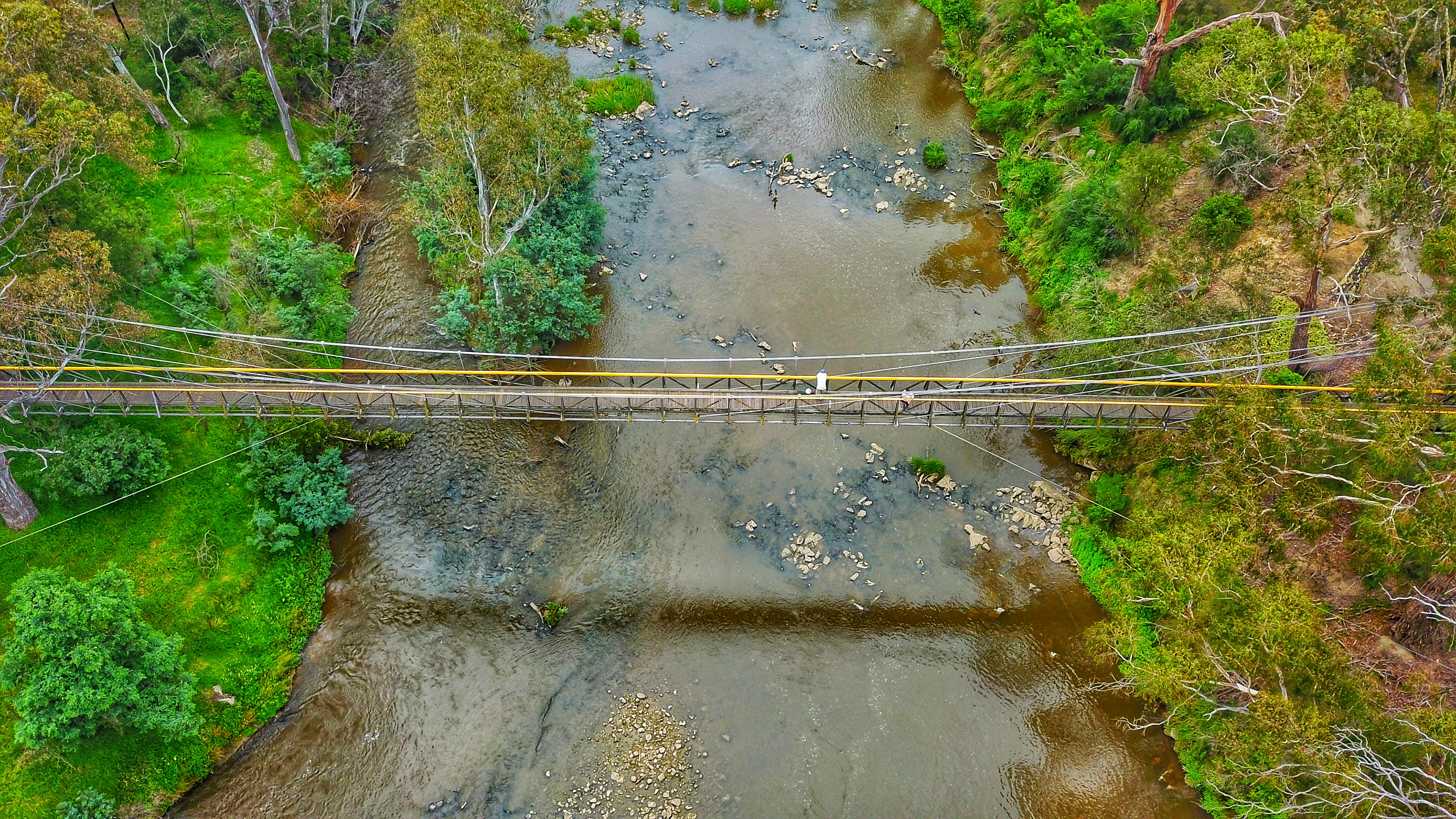
Topdown perspective of Ruffey Trail suspension bridge. Shot December 2018.

Leaving the Yarra River Trail at Odyssey House, cross the narrow suspension bridge to the south side of the Yarra River. The Ruffey Creek Trail is not signed at this point. Once over the river go immediately to the left (east) of the carpark and cross a very small wooden footbridge that crosses Ruffey Creek.

At the juncture of Swilk St and Parker St, 0.8 km from the Yarra, a small street section is encountered. Head east along Parker Street, not Swilk Street, south down McLachlan Street and cross Foote Street where the path resumes.

At Eumeralla Avenue continue south down the street to Montpellier Park. At this point there are two options:

- Head across the park, in line with Eumeralla Avenue (south) and then follow a road section east along Montpellier Crescent. The later ends at a main road, Williamsons Road, turn left (north) and rejoin the path at the Williamsons Road underpass.
- Follow a goat track, directly on the left (east), that follows the edge of the park parallel to a line of trees, heading down a steep hill in the park itself. This leads to the Williamsons Road underpass where the path restarts.

While steepish, the goat track is easier to navigate than the road route. Pass through the Williamsons Road underpass and the underpass at King Street to Ruffey Lake Park. At the lake the path forks to either side of lake. The right fork (south side) is not as steep as the north side. Continue along either path to Victoria Street.

At the end of the trail, not far from Ruffey Lake Park is Schramm cottage built by the original German settlers.

== Connections ==
Yarra River Trail in the north. Dead end in the south about 90m from the corner of Victoria and George Streets by Ruffey Lake Park. Travelling 2 km to the north east by road leads to the Greengully Trail.

Traveling south by 1.9 km on Middleborough Road leads to the Koonung Creek Trail. A quieter and safer alternative is to travel via Church Road parallel to and west of Middleborough Road.

North end at 37.752449°S 145.117391°E. South end at 37.779455°S 145.145040°E.
