= Herb Sawatzky =

Australian rules footballer

Personal information
- Full name: Erhard Cornelius Sawatzky
- Born: 24 October 1933; Jaffa, Mandatory Palestine
- Died: 14 February 1999 (aged 65); Lilydale, Victoria, Australia
- Original team: Mitcham (ESFL)
- Debut: 22 May 1954, Richmond vs. Hawthorn, at Punt Road Oval
- Height: 183 cm (6 ft 0 in)
- Weight: 92 kg (203 lb)
- Position: Follower / Ruckman

Playing career^{1}
Years	Club	Games (Goals)
1954–55	Richmond	7 (0)
- ^{1} Playing statistics correct to the end of 1955.

Career highlights
- VFA: VFL seconds premiership player: 1954, 1955; Richmond seconds best & fairest: 1955

Erhard Cornelius Sawatzky (24 October 1933 – 14 February 1999) was a former Australian rules footballer who played with Richmond in the Victorian Football League (VFL).

== Early life and junior football ==
After leaving to come to Australia, Sawatzky and his family where placed in the Rushworth Internment Camp in Victoria during World War II. Inside the camp Sawatzky was exposed to Australian rules football for the first time. Sawatzky's family relocated to Rutherglen, Victoria, where Sawatzky was schooled and learnt to speak English, before relocating again to Mitcham, Victoria. Sawatzky played for the Mitcham U16's team in 1949 and was voted Best & Fairest the same year before playing for Box Hill Technical School in 1950. He later played for Mitcham seniors during 1951–52 playing 36 games and winning a premiership, before moving to Richmond under coach Jack Dyer.

== VFL career ==
He made his VFL debut in Round 6 of the 1954 VFL season against Hawthorn at home in a one goal loss 10.12 (72) – 11.12 (78). He played just four games in his debut season. In his second and last season with Richmond seniors he played only three games. He played 52 games and kicked 43 goals for the Richmond reserves side during his short term there from 1953–55. In addition he won two premierships with the Richmond reserves in 1954 and 1955 and was 1955 Best & Fairest. After moving on from Richmond he played his football for Box Hill during 1956–61 playing 78 games and kicking 83 goals before playing 16 games for Bennettswood in 1962.

== Statistics ==
Statistics are correct as of 2017.

Legend
G	Goals	K	Kicks	D	Disposals	T	Tackles
B	Behinds	H	Handballs	M	Marks

Season	Team	No.	Games	Totals							Averages (per game)						
Season	Team	No.	Games	G	B	K	H	D	M	T	G	B	K	H	D	M	T
1954	Richmond	24	4	0													
1955	Richmond	24	3	0													
Career			7	0													

== Honours ==
=== Team ===
- VFL reserves pemiership (Richmond): 1954, 1955

=== Individual ===
- Richmond reserves Best & Fairest: 1955
