= Roland Duncan =

Australian rules footballer

Personal information
- Full name: Roland Ramsay Duncan
- Born: 6 February 1879; Templestowe, Victoria
- Died: 22 March 1958 (aged 79); Ivanhoe, Victoria
- Original team: Heidelberg
- Height: 175 cm (5 ft 9 in)
- Weight: 71 kg (157 lb)

Playing career^{1}
Years	Club	Games (Goals)
1900	Collingwood	8 (5)
- ^{1} Playing statistics correct to the end of 1900.

Roland Ramsay Duncan (6 February 1879 – 22 March 1958) was an Australian rules footballer who played with Collingwood in the Victorian Football League (VFL).
