= Alan Barelli =

Australian rules footballer

Personal information
- Full name: Alan Louis Barelli
- Born: 20 May 1920; Mitcham, Victoria, Australia
- Died: 3 May 2008 (aged 87); Mitcham, Victoria, Australia
- Original team: Mitcham
- Height: 188 cm (6 ft 2 in)
- Weight: 86 kg (190 lb)

Playing career^{1}
Years	Club	Games (Goals)
1940–1942	Hawthorn	18 (16)
- ^{1} Playing statistics correct to the end of 1942.

Alan Louis Barelli (20 May 1920 – 3 May 2008) was an Australian rules footballer who played for the Hawthorn Football Club in the Victorian Football League (VFL).

== Personal life ==
Anderson served as a lance corporal in the Australian Army during the Second World War.
