= Ringwood to Belgrave Rail Trail =

Rail trail in Victoria, Australia

Ringwood - Belgrave Rail Trail
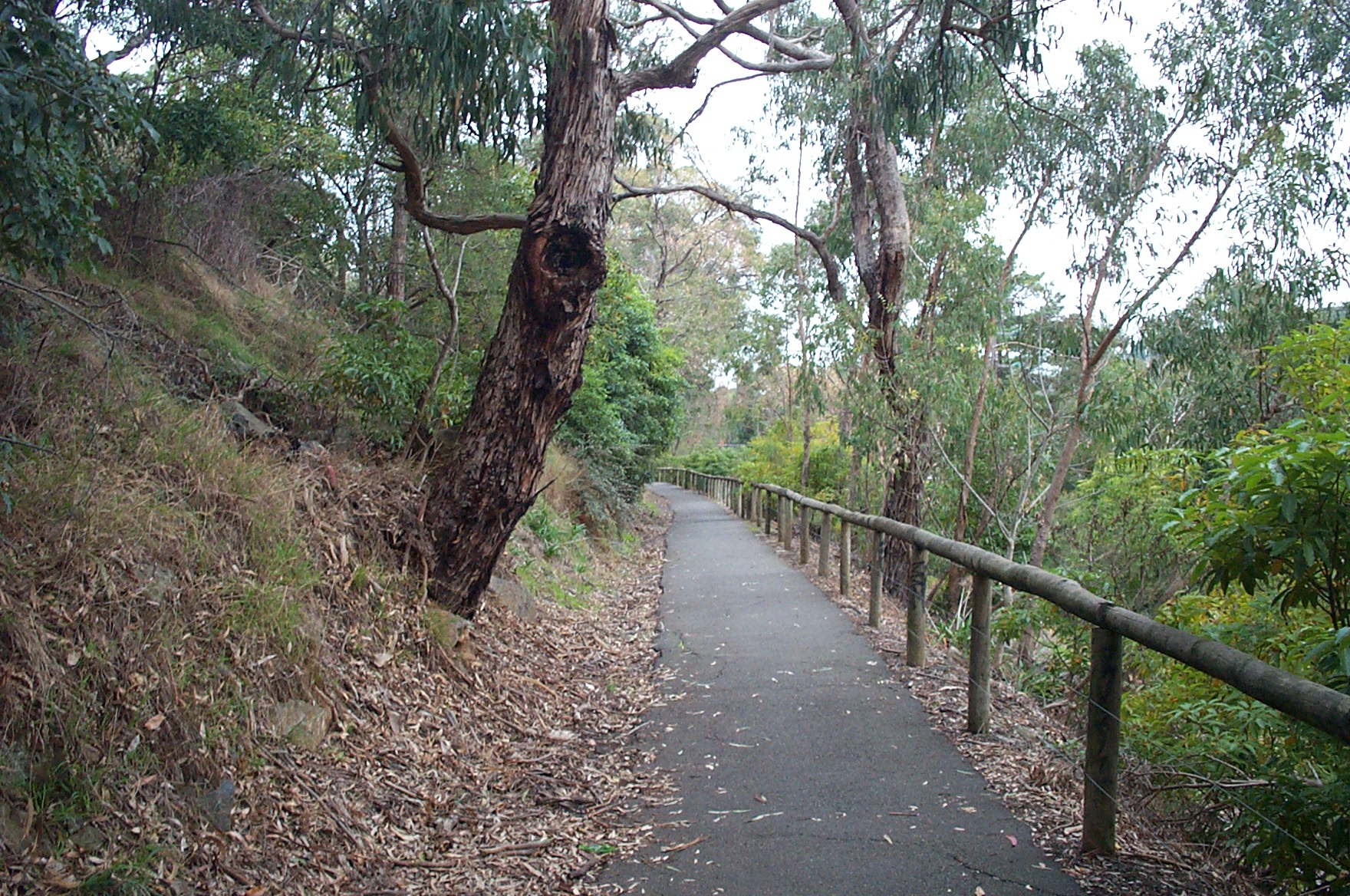
- The Ringwood - Belgrave Rail Trail in Upwey
- Length: 19.2km
- Location: Melbourne, Victoria, Australia
- Difficulty: Easy to medium
- Hazards: Numerous road crossings Minor on-road sections Travel through several car parks
- Surface: Mostly asphalt, with some concrete sections
- Hills: From Upper Ferntree Gully to Belgrave
- Train: Belgrave line
- Parking: Adjacent railway stations H.E. Parker Reserve, Heathmont; Ringwood Lake, Ringwood; Marie Wallace Bayswater Park, Bayswater; Tim Neville Arboretum, Ferntree Gully

Trail map
- Ringwood to Belgrave Rail Trail Map

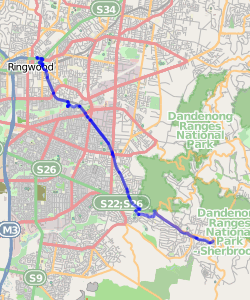
An overview map of the trail.

The Ringwood to Belgrave Rail Trail is a shared use path for cyclists and pedestrians that follows the Belgrave railway line from the Mullum Mullum Creek Trail in Ringwood to Belgrave railway station in Belgrave, in the outer eastern suburbs of Melbourne, Victoria, Australia.

This trail connects with various other cycling and walking routes in the area, as well as being directly serviced by eight railway stations on the Belgrave railway line along its 19.2 km route. By August 2024, a 445-metre shared-use path had opened in Ringwood as part of the Bedford Road level crossing removal project, linking Bedford Park with the Heathmont Rail Trail.

== Following the trail ==
Despite the trail being marked in several publications and on cycle route websites, the trail has minimal directional signage. The route consists of the following three sections:

=== Ringwood to Bayswater ===
Starting in Ringwood and ending in Belgrave, the trail begins as a turn-off from the Mullum Mullum Creek Trail near the Ringwood Bypass underpass in Ringwood. The trail then traverses 250m of local streets leading to a short path through to the Maroondah Highway / Ringwood Bypass / Mount Dandenong Road intersection. The trail resumes at the southeast corner of this intersection, leading to Ringwood Lake and crossing the Lilydale railway line before traveling through Bedford Reserve on a sealed access road.

The trail then follows Bedford Road east for 170m, which can be traversed either on-road or via the roadside footpaths and the pedestrian traffic lights outside Ringwood Secondary College. The trail takes a right and runs south down Lena Grove for 360m before the off-road shared path resumes at the cul-de-sac. The trail follows the Belgrave railway line on the eastern side until Heathmont Railway Station where the trail switches to the western side of the railway at Canterbury Road. The trail then goes downhill to H.E. Parker Reserve in Heathmont. Using the reserve access road heading south, a left turn at the footbridge over the Dandenong Creek takes trail users to the Dandenong Creek Trail. At this point, the Ringwood - Belgrave Rail Trail and the Dandenong Creek Trail share the same path for 835m east before the trails branch off each other. A right turn immediately after the tunnel under the railway then takes users south along the eastern side of the railway line towards Mountain Highway and Bayswater Railway Station.

=== Bayswater - Upper Ferntree Gully ===
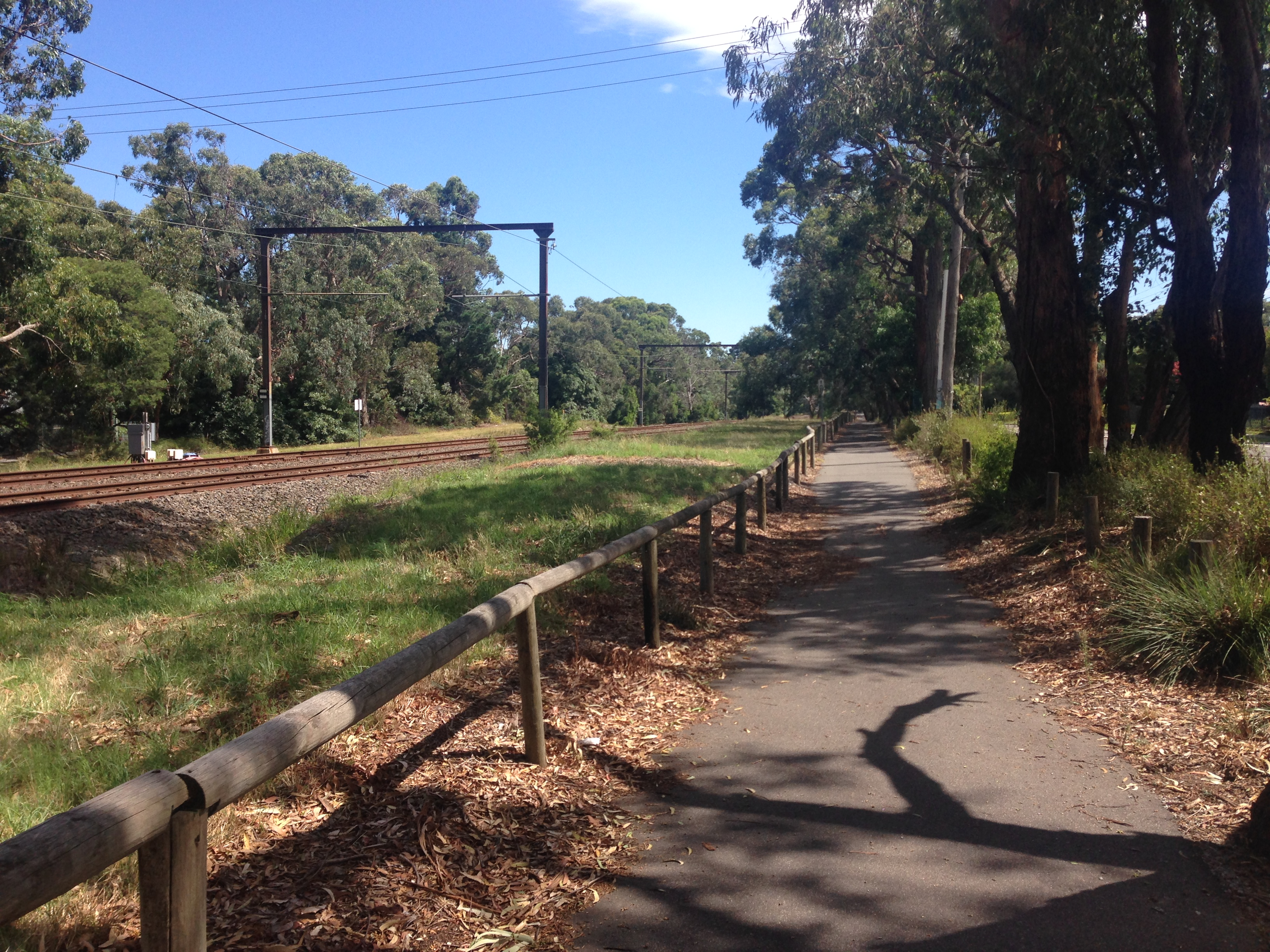
Ringwood-Belgrave Rail Trail at Ferntree Gully.

Around Bayswater railway station, the trail runs past the bus stops and the station car park, which can be a congested environment with both pedestrians and vehicles, requiring caution. The trail continues on the western side of the railway until Bayswater Road, where it switches back to the eastern side and from there, uninterrupted to Boronia railway station. It then traverses through Boronia Junction Shopping Centre car park to reach the Boronia Road / Dorset Road intersection. The trail resumes on the southeast corner of the intersection, where it once again follows the railway on the eastern side. The turn-off for the Blind Creek Trail is located halfway between Boronia and Ferntree Gully. From Ferntree Gully Railway Station, the trail goes through the station car park to the level crossing. After crossing at the Alpine Street / Station Street / The Avenue intersection, the trail continues south on the western side of the railway, across a scenic footbridge over Forest Road to pedestrian traffic lights at Burwood Highway in Upper Ferntree Gully. A short 400m shared use path takes the user to the entrance to Upper Ferntree Gully Railway Station while crossing at the traffic lights takes the user further along the trail.

=== Upper Ferntree Gully - Belgrave ===
The trail travels south on a shared-use path alongside Forest Oak Drive before arriving at the turn-off for the Ferny Creek Trail. A left turn then takes trail users east through the area immediately south of Upper Ferntree Gully. Most of this section runs along shared-use paths alongside local streets. Upon reaching the railway bridge over Burwood Highway, the trail runs east alongside native trees and shrubs between the northern side of the railway and the southern side of Burwood Highway. This takes the user to Upwey and Upwey railway station. Staying on the northern side of the railway, the trail continues to run alongside Burwood Highway until Glenfern Road, where the trail leaves the highway and follows the railway once again until arriving at the end of Campbell Street in Tecoma. A 130 m trip along Campbell Street and a right turn down McNicol Road leads to an immediate right turn to Tecoma railway station while an immediate left turn is where the trail continues. A short trip down this final section of shared use path leads to the back of the Belgrave strip shops where a short 220 m on-road trip down Blacksmiths Way east leads to the entrance to Belgrave railway station, where the trail finishes.

== Connections ==
Travelling downhill, from south to north, the Ferny Creek Trail is encountered first, then the Blind Creek Trail, then the Dandenong Creek Trail and finally the upper Mullum Mullum Creek Trail.

The Birds Land Reserve to Lysterfield Park Trail starts near the Belgrave Rail Trail. To reach the reserve, users can leave the trail at Tecoma railway station and head south down McNicol Road for 2.5 km. Alternatively, users can leave from Belgrave railway station and head south, down the Belgrave-Hallam Road. To reach the reserve, trail users would then turn right (west) at Kaola Street 600m later cross the very small reserve to Apsley Road, continue down Apsley Road, turn left at McNicol Road, cross the bridge, and arrive at Birds Land Reserve, 3 km in total.

The south end of the Birds Land Reserve to Lysterfield Park Trail starts at the very south end of Lysterfield Park, just 4.5 km by quiet roads from the Hallam Bypass Trail. Trail users can leave the Hallam Bypass Trail using the freeway underpass 400m west of Ernst Wanke Road. They can follow the shared path and then travel along Drysdale Road and Heathdale Road. At the small roundabout, users can turn left (north) up Glenwood Road, cross Belgrave-Hallam Road, and continue north up Jacques Road. They can turn left (west) at Heatherton Road and right (north) up Reservoir Road.

The north and south ends of the trail are at 37.810814°S 145.233744°E and 37.909461°S 145.354609°E, respectively.
