= Percy Chivers =

Australian cricketer

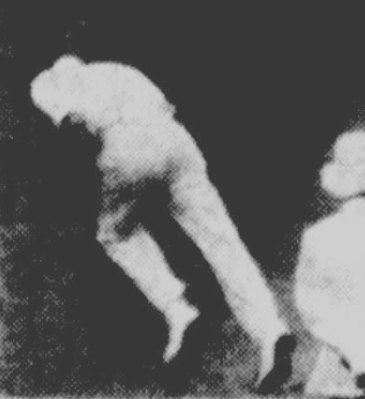

Personal information
- Born: 15 August 1908; Templestowe, Victoria, Australia
- Died: 11 July 1997 (aged 88); Templestowe, Victoria, Australia

Domestic team information
- Years: Team
- 1929-1930: Victoria
- Source: Cricinfo, 21 November 2015

Percy Chivers (15 August 1908 – 11 July 1997) was an Australian cricketer. He played three first-class cricket matches for Victoria between 1929 and 1930.

== See also ==
- List of Victoria first-class cricketers
