= Jack Zander (footballer) =

Australian rules footballer (1910–2002)

Personal information
- Full name: John Ross Zander
- Born: 6 July 1910; Mitcham, Victoria
- Died: 29 July 2002 (aged 92)
- Original team: Bayswater

Playing career^{1}
Years	Club	Games (Goals)
1933–34, 1937	Hawthorn	14 (13)
- ^{1} Playing statistics correct to the end of 1937.

John Ross Zander (6 July 1910 – 29 July 2002), also known as Roy Zander (Note: Often misspelled as Zanders.), was an Australian rules footballer who played with Hawthorn in the Victorian Football League (VFL).
