= Jim Keogh (footballer) =

Australian rules footballer

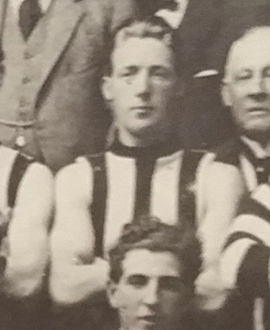
- Keogh in 1921

Personal information
- Full name: James Joseph Keogh
- Born: 10 September 1897; Mitcham, Victoria
- Died: 1 June 1963 (aged 65); Queensland
- Original team: Surrey Hills
- Height: 180 cm (5 ft 11 in)
- Weight: 73 kg (161 lb)

Playing career^{1}
Years	Club	Games (Goals)
1921	Collingwood	4 (0)
1922–25	Brunswick (VFA)	51 (1)
- ^{1} Playing statistics correct to the end of 1925.

James Joseph Keogh (10 September 1897 – 1 June 1963) was an Australian rules footballer who played with Collingwood in the Victorian Football League (VFL).

== Family ==
The son of Thomas William Keogh (1860–1928) and Flora Jane Keogh (1872–1955), née Titus, James Joseph Keogh was born at Mitcham, Victoria on 10 September 1897.

== Education ==
He was educated at St Patrick's College, Ballarat.

== Military service ==
Aged 18, Keogh enlisted in the First AIF in May 1916, and served overseas, returning to Australia in June 1919.

== Football ==
=== Collingwood (VFL) ===
Jim Keogh played four games for Collingwood in 1921, but struggled to gain a regular place in the Collingwood team.

=== Brunswick (VFA) ===
Keogh transferred to Brunswick in 1922 where he played for the next four seasons.
