= Mullauna Secondary College =

Mullauna College

Location
- 456 Springfield Road; Mitcham, Victoria, 3132; Australia; 37°48′30″S 145°11′26″E

Information
- Type: State, secular, secondary, co-ed
- Established: 1989
- Principal: Harald Ruff
- Grades: 7–12
- Enrolment: 650
- Colours: Blue and white
- Website: mullauna.vic.edu.au

Mullauna College is a public, co-educational high school in Mitcham, Victoria, Australia servicing year 7 to 12. It is located on the corner of Mitcham and Springfield Roads, and presently has an enrolment of approximately 650 local and international students. The Principal team of Mullauna College consists of Harald Ruff as Principal, Jeff McMillin as Assistant Principal and Michael Bray as Assistant Principal.

== History ==
The school was formed as an amalgamation of Mitcham High School, Mitcham Technical School, and Donvale High School at the beginning of 1989, and operated on three campuses for a short period of time. In 1994, the decision was made to merge all three campuses. The Donvale campus closed at the end of the following year, with its population of Year 7–10 students moved to the Mitcham campus. The VCE campus, on Dunlavin Road, remained open until the end of 1996.

== Student Representative Council ==
Mullauna College has an active SRC (Student Representative Council) headed by Mr McMillin. The student union organises student events such as free dress days (non uniform day), band events, barbecues and tree plantings, as well as lobbying for better facilities for students.

== Music program ==
Mullauna also hosts a music program, the campus has its own special music building as well as additional classrooms. There is a department of professional music teachers teaching students the art of music.

== Facilities ==
Mullauna College's buildings were originally constructed in the Light Timber Construction (LTC) style, which was developed to aid in the speedy construction of government schools in the 1950s. Since then, the buildings have been substantially remodelled.

Mullauna's facilities include a sports hall where students attend the curriculum subject of P.E (Physical Education), the sports hall also includes a gym on the second level. There are two large ovals, with courts for basketball, tennis, badminton, table tennis, volleyball and netball. Mullauna also has a range of computer rooms and classroom 'PODS' helping extend the learning capacity of students.

Students can access the library with many books and resources available at their disposal.

== International students ==
Mullauna currently hosts a range of overseas students (mainly Chinese). Students complete year 12 then are eligible to apply for studying in Australian Universities. Transition staff are available for Chinese international students. These staff members help the students understand Australian education and try to make the students as comfortable as possible.
