= Mullum Mullum Creek Trail =

Shared use path for cyclists and pedestrians in Melbourne, Victoria, Australia

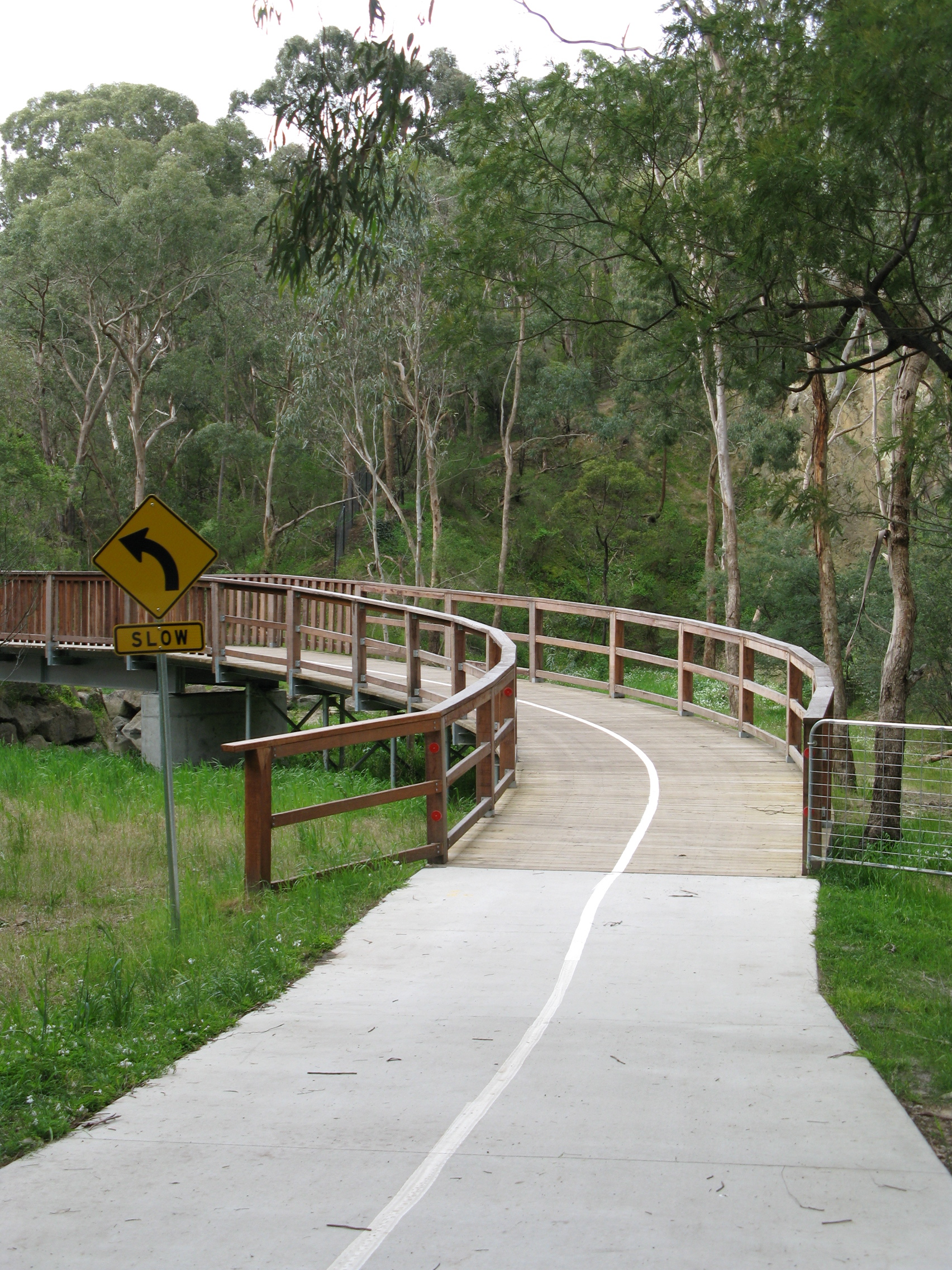
- Mullum Mullum Creek Trail through Yarran Dheran
- Length: Upper 5.4km, lower 7.8km
- Location: Melbourne, Victoria, Australia
- Difficulty: Easy
- Hazards: Horses
- Hills: Undulating
- Train: Ringwood station
- Tram: None

The Mullum Mullum Creek Trail is a shared use path for cyclists and pedestrians, which follows Mullum Mullum Creek in the outer eastern suburbs in Melbourne, Victoria, Australia. The Mullum Mullum Creek Trail extends from the Eastlink Trail at Sherbrook Park to Highland Avenue in Croydon.

The path was previously split into two sections, but later connected to form one continuous trail from Templestowe to Croydon. The lower section of the path consists of the Yarra River Trail in Templestowe and Park Road in Donvale. The upper section is between the end of the Heads Road in Donvale and Highland Avenue in Croydon. The central section, between Park Road and Heads Road in Donvale, was completed in July 2018 and formally opened on 16 September 2018.

== Following the path ==
=== Upper section ===
The upper section starts at the end of Highland Ave. The path heads in a south west direction, with at-level road crossings at Kalinda Road, Oban Road, and Oliver Street. The trail heads under a tunnel, with an immediate junction. Trail users can turn left, heading east toward the Belgrave Rail Trail, which runs on-road along Larissa Avenue and Ringwood Lake. The Mullum Mullum Creek Trail takes a right turn towards Eastland Shopping Centre. A road crossing at Warrandyte Road and a tunnel under Ringwood Street connects to the end of the EastLink Trail. There is also access under Deep Creek Road and into Yarran Dheran under the EastLink onramps. The path is paved and mixed with timber bridges and boardwalks.

At the junction of Quarry Road and Becketts Road there is an at-level crossing. After the crossing, the trail splits into two. To the north west is the start of the Koonung Creek Trail. Turning right continues to the end point of the Mullum Mullum Creek Trail at Heads Road.

The Koonung Creek Trail heads to Doncaster and eventually the Melbourne CBD along the Eastern Freeway. Along the route are the Mullum Mullum Creek and Mullum Mullum Creek Park.

=== Central Section ===
The 1 km 'missing link' of the Mullum Mullum Creek Trail, from Heads Road to Park Road south, runs along the boundary of Whitefriars College. Before it was upgraded it was an informal dirt track. Construction through this section was delayed for various reasons, including the installation of new sewer main infrastructure along the corridor. 600 metres of sewer pipes were installed by Yarra Valley Water as part of the Donvale Sewerage Project in March 2017. From 2016-17, Manningham Council undertook enabling works at Park Road to allow construction to commence as soon as the sewerage works are completed, with three bridges across the creek being pre-fabricated offsite. This section of the path is a 2.5 metre-wide concrete surface consisting of three bridges, a 40 metre ramp, and several boardwalks.

Prior to September 2018, trail users wishing to travel from Schwerkolt Cottage to the lower section and to the Main Yarra Trail at Templestowe were required to detour, continuing along the Koonung Creek Trail up to Park Road. Due to the steep and narrow nature of Heads Road, in addition to lacking a footpath or bicycle lane, trail users still take the former detour.

=== Lower section ===
The lower section starts at Park Road and continues 8.5 km to the Main Yarra Trail and crosses Heidelberg - Warrandyte Road. On the far side is a wooden bridge and boardwalk - continue to the left - the right leads to a tea house at Beasley's Nursery.

After 1.1 km the path opens up into a more open area and meets the Greengully Trail that enters from the left (south). Users can continue past large open areas where Kangaroos/Wallabies can be seen on a regular basis. Deer have also been sighted.

The trail ends at the confluence of the Mullum Mullum Creek and the Yarra River in Templestowe. A lookout surveys the spot. The Main Yarra Trail starts here.

== Connections ==
The trail connects with the EastLink Trail near Beckett Road, Ringwood. The upper section of the trail at Larissa Ave, Ringwood connects to the Belgrave Rail Trail. The northeastern end of the upper section finishes at Highland Ave, Croydon and has an on-road connection to the Tarralla Creek Trail. The northern end of the lower section connects to the Main Yarra Trail. The path also connects to the Greengully Trail 1.2 km south of the Yarra. The southern end of the lower section terminates at Park Rd.

Upper: West end at 37.804200°S 145.204411°E. East end at 37.785142°S 145.264044°E.
Lower: North end at 37.738386°S 145.161994°E. South end at 37.775679°S 145.190680°E.

=== Tarralla Creek Trail Connection ===
From Highland Ave, a 2.7 km road section, via Croydon station, can be used to reach the Tarralla Creek Trail. Continue on Highland Ave to the Maroondah Highway service lane, using the service lane to the Kent Ave intersection. Cross Maroondah Hwy at Kent Ave. Cyclists may utilize the on-road semi-protected bicycle lanes on Kent Ave. Continue onto Main St, Croydon via the level crossing at the roundabout and Croydon War Memorial. Follow Main St to Hewish Rd, where the Tarralla Creek Trail begins at Croydon Park.

=== Belgrave Rail Trail Connection ===
Completed in 2013, the Maroondah Council project "Lake to Creek Link Project" improves the link to Ringwood Lake and the Belgrave Rail Trail. At Larissa Ave, follow the trail to the signalized pedestrian crossing of Maroondah Hwy where the trail enters Ringwood Lake. Continue 250m along the southern side of the lake to a narrow turnoff, moving across the Lilydale railway line and into Bedford Park. Follow the driveway through Bedford Park to Bedford Rd, crossing Bedford Rd at the signalized intersection at the front of Ringwood Secondary College. The Belgrave Rail Trail begins at the southern end of Lena Grove.
