= Oppy Family Fun Ride =

Cycling event in Melbourne, Australia

The Oppy Family Fun Ride is a non competitive cycling event held in City of Knox, Melbourne, Victoria, Australia, by the Knox City Council, in the memory of Hubert Opperman, who resided in Knox just before his death in 1996.

The event is part of The Knox Festival, held each year in summer. The route loops round the Knox area, past the many pieces of art dedicated to Hubert Opperman that can be found in the city environs.

== See also ==
- Cycling in Melbourne
