= Schwerkolt Cottage =

Building in Victoria, Australia

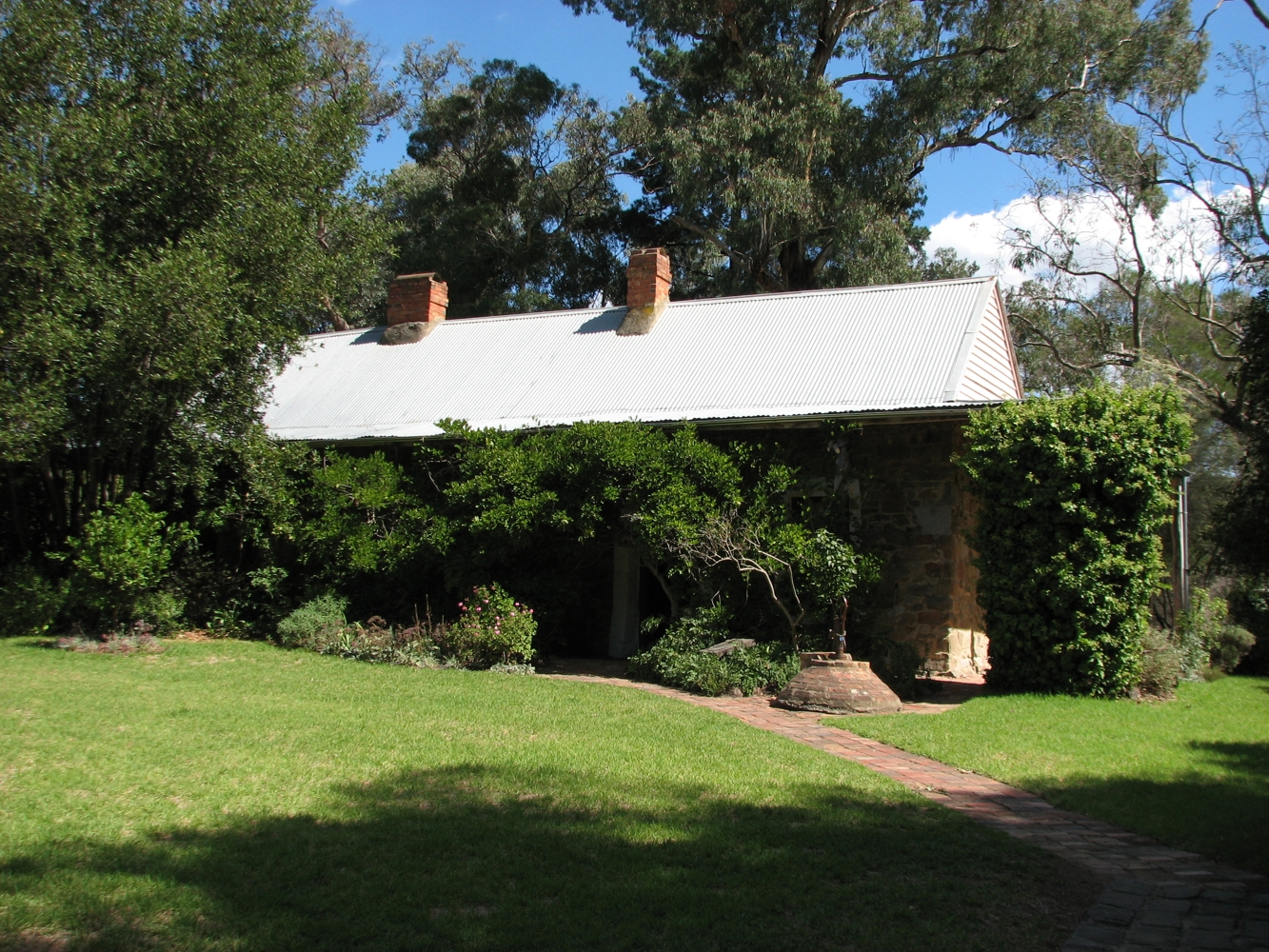
- Schwerkolt Cottage
- Interactive map of the Schwerkolt Cottage area

General information
- Location: 10 Deep Creek Rd Mitcham, Victoria
- Coordinates: 37.811314°S 145.211142°E
- Construction started: 1865
- Owner: Whitehorse Historical Society

Website
- http://home.vicnet.net.au/~ndhsinc/

Schwerkolt Cottage is a pioneer cottage built around 1880 at Mitcham, Victoria.

This heritage site encompasses the original stone cottage, associated replicated outbuildings and a local history museum, surrounded by 2.25 hectares of gardens and bushland, and adjacent to Yarran Dheran bushland park. The stone cottage has been restored to its original condition and furnished in a style of the period and houses items curated by the Whitehorse Historical Society. The cottage is of an unusual design with three rooms opening onto a verandah with individual external doors but no doors between the rooms. There are communication holes between the rooms. This is believed to be a vernacular style from Schwerkolt's homeland.

== History ==
August Schwerkolt (1822-1886) emigrated with his wife Paulina (1823-1884) from the town of Świebodzin in Prussia arriving at Hobson’s Bay on 20 December 1849. They settled initially in Northcote, where several fellow Germans had already established. On 14 December 1861, the Schwerkolts purchased 88 acres of land beside the Mullum Mullum Creek or Deep Creek, Mitcham, and with their children worked both properties for a time, with a market garden at Northcote, and charcoal-burning at Mitcham, while they cleared the Mitcham property for mixed farming. Schwerkolt built the first house at Mitcham in 1864 using stone excavated from near the creek and progressively added several other outbuildings, including a stone smokehouse, a second timber cottage and stables, a blacksmith and a wine cellar. Schwerkolt built a third cottage in stone with three rooms around 1886. August married a second time (to Wilhelmina) in 1885, and the cottage was only partially finished when he died in January 1886.

The cottage was rented out to tenants for some time but was condemned in 1960 by the Department of Housing. Still, the impending demolition resulted in the local community campaigning to preserve it. The former City of Nunawading purchased the site in 1964, and restoration was carried out by a group of volunteers committed to local heritage issues. The restored building was opened by the Governor of Victoria, Sir Rohan Delacombe, on 17 November 1965. Further reconstruction of original buildings including the blacksmith, barn, stone smokehouse, and underground wine cellars was undertaken, and new buildings were erected to house the collection of the Whitehorse Historical Society. The smokehouse has been reconstructed using original photographs from the Schwerkolt family whilst not in the original location. The cellar however was reconstructed in its original place after archaeological excavations located its existence. This local history museum was opened in 1977 and has had several extensions added to it over the last 15 years. An orchard shed was also constructed in mid-2000.

== Collection ==
Whitehorse Historical Society holds a wide-ranging collection of 2D media from photographs to newspapers as well as objects and textiles relating to the history of the residents of Blackburn, Blackburn North, Blackburn South, Forest Hill, Nunawading, Mitcham, Vermont and Vermont South highlighting their domestic and working lives. They also have an oral history collection and a range of publications relating to local heritage
