= Sforzando (band) =

Australian Celtic music band

- Origin: Melbourne, Victoria, Australia
- Genres: Celtic
- Years active: 1995–2007
- Label: Mabuhay
- Past members: Quincy Hall; Raju Sharma; Scott Jansen; Paul Tierney; Dave O'Reilly; Ben Tarpey; Sharon Ryan; Wez Rowe

Sforzando were an Australian Celtic music band from Melbourne, that combine elements of punk, Western European folk music and sea shanties to create "a soundscape for the ocean". They describe themselves as a "pirate orchestra" with Irish and Balkan influences in their sound. They issued two studio albums, We Sail Away (1997) and Hideous Sea Creatures (2002) and various other recordings including SF-EP and Midnight at the Lighthouse (live).

== History ==
Sforzando formed in 1995 in Melbourne by Quincy Hall on lead vocals, Dave O'Reilly on lead guitar, his sister, Karen O'Reilly, on bass guitar and Ross on drums. The group's name, sforzando, is used in musical notation to indicate that the following note should be played loudly (see dynamics). They chose this to match their loud, frenetic punk rock style.

In 1999 they performed at the Lighthouse Cafe, during the Port Fairy Folk Festival, which was recorded for their live album, Midnight at the Lighthouse, with the line-up of Hall, Scott Jansen, Stuart Mathieson, Dave O'Reilly, Karen O'Reilly, Raju Sharma and Paul Tierney.

By 2002's album, Hideous Sea Creatures, they were a six-piece and self-described as a "pirate orchestra who blend ferocious punk, Western European folk melodies and classic sea shanties to create a soundscape for the ocean." Sylvia Gauci of Vibewire caught their gig in August 2002 at The Tote in Collingwood; she felt they "played a wide selection of both more traditional, folk-inspired tunes along with the fast punk and vivacious violin playing. But on top of the musical fun, lead singer Quincy used some time to voice his opinion on the highly questionable state of our government and foreign affairs – a very commendable use of time talking to the audience."

By 2006 the line-up was Hall on lead vocals, Sharma on percussion, Jansen on violin, Tierney on drums, Dave O'Reilly on guitar and Garth Heron on bass guitar.

== Members ==
- Quincy Hall – vocals
- Garth Heron – bass guitar
- Scott Jansen – violin
- Dave O'Reilly – guitar
- Karen O'Relly – bass guitar
- Raju Sharma – percussion
- Ben Tarpey – bass guitar
- Paul Tierney – drums
- Sharon Ryan – guitar
- Wez Rowe – keyboards, accordion

== Discography ==
=== Albums ===
- We Sail Away (Mabuhay Records, 1997) (MBR00004)
- Midnight at the Lighthouse (πR8, 1999; live at Port Fairy Folk Festival)
- Hideous Sea Creatures (Sound Vault, 2002)

=== Extended plays ===
- SFZ.ep (Sforzando, 2005) (1698249)
