= Templestowe =

- Suburb
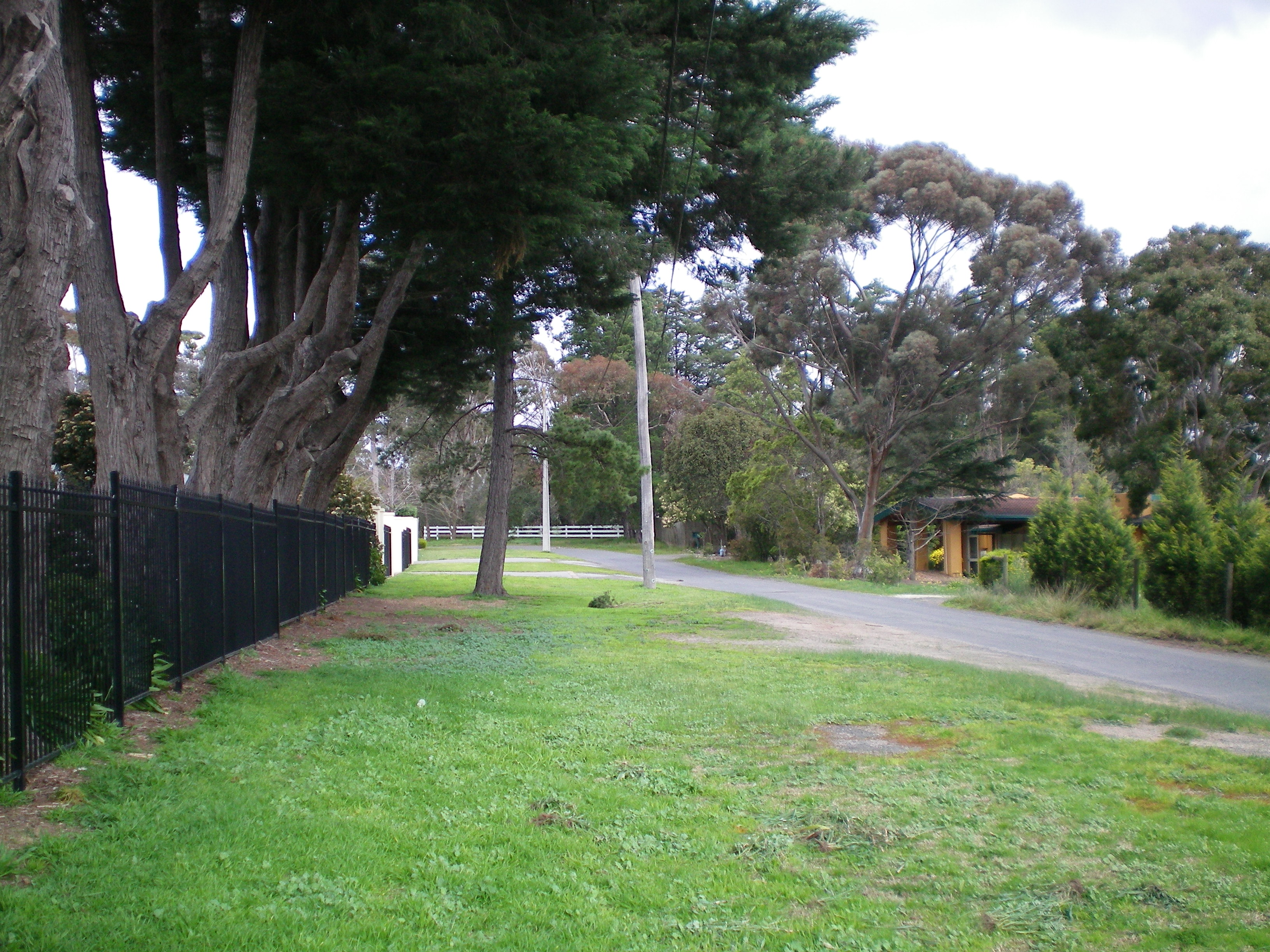

- Interactive map of Templestowe
- Coordinates: 37.753°S 145.135°E
- Country: Australia
- State: Victoria
- City: Melbourne
- LGA: City of Manningham
- Location: 16 km (9.9 mi) from Melbourne

Government
  - State electorates: Bulleen; Warrandyte
  - Federal division: Menzies

Area
  - Total: 14.7 km^{2} (5.7 sq mi)

Population
  - Total: 16,966 (2021 census)
  - Density: 1,154/km^{2} (2,989/sq mi)
- Postcode: 3106
Suburbs around Templestowe
| Lower Plenty | Eltham | Warrandyte |
| Templestowe Lower | Templestowe | Doncaster East |
| Doncaster | Doncaster East | Donvale |

Templestowe is a suburb of Melbourne, Victoria, Australia, 16 km north-east of Melbourne's Central Business District, located within the City of Manningham local government area. Templestowe recorded a population of 16,966 at the 2021 census.

The suburb has a number of natural attractions, including parklands, contrasted with large shopping malls.

== Geography ==
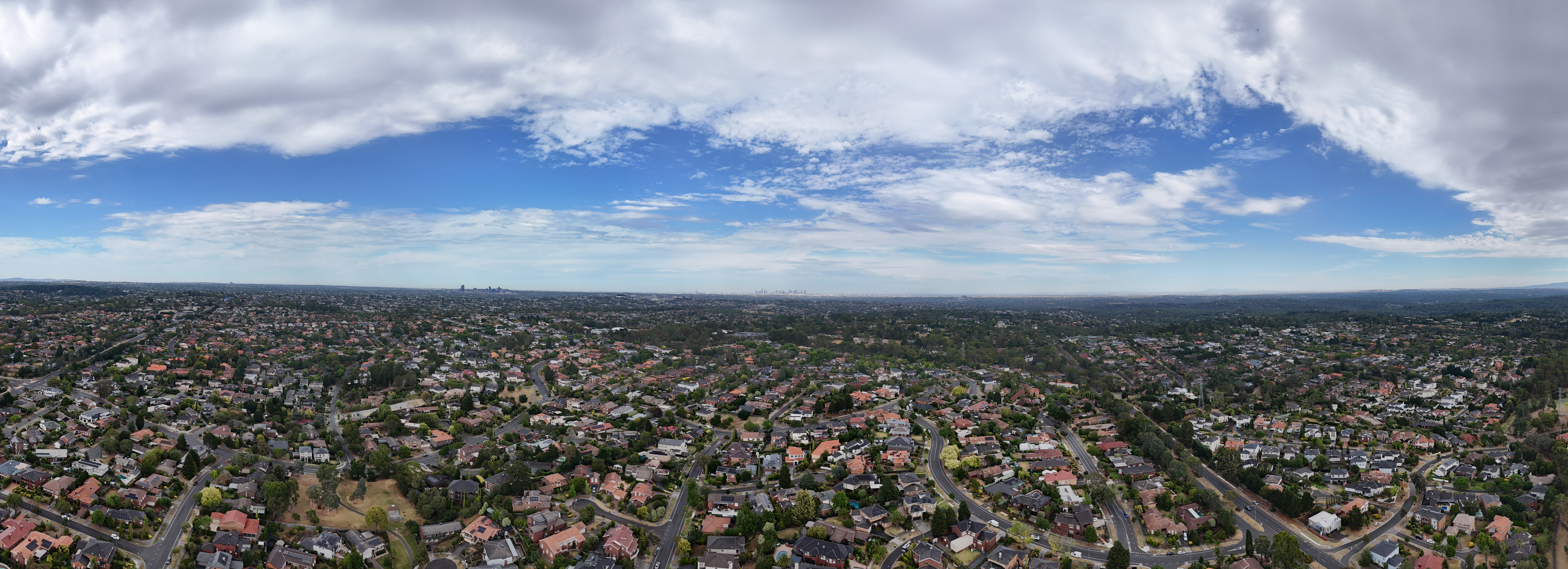
Templestowe facing the city skyline

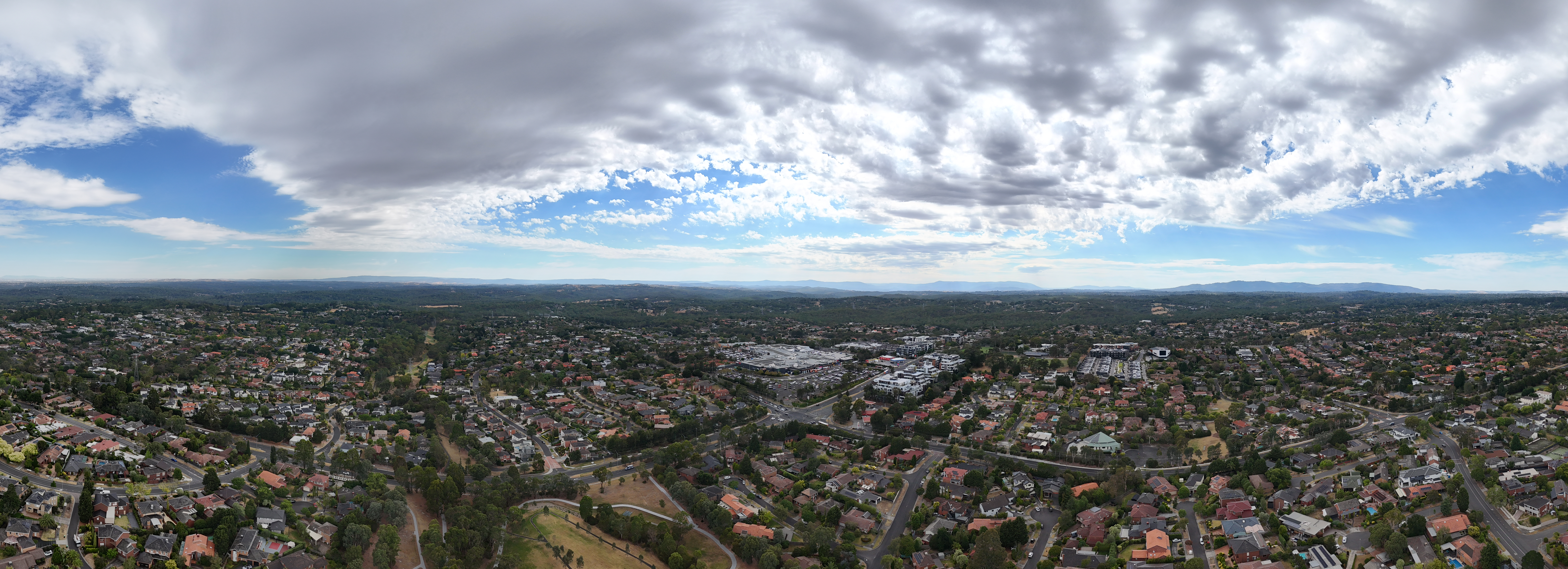
Templestowe aerial panorama facing the Pines

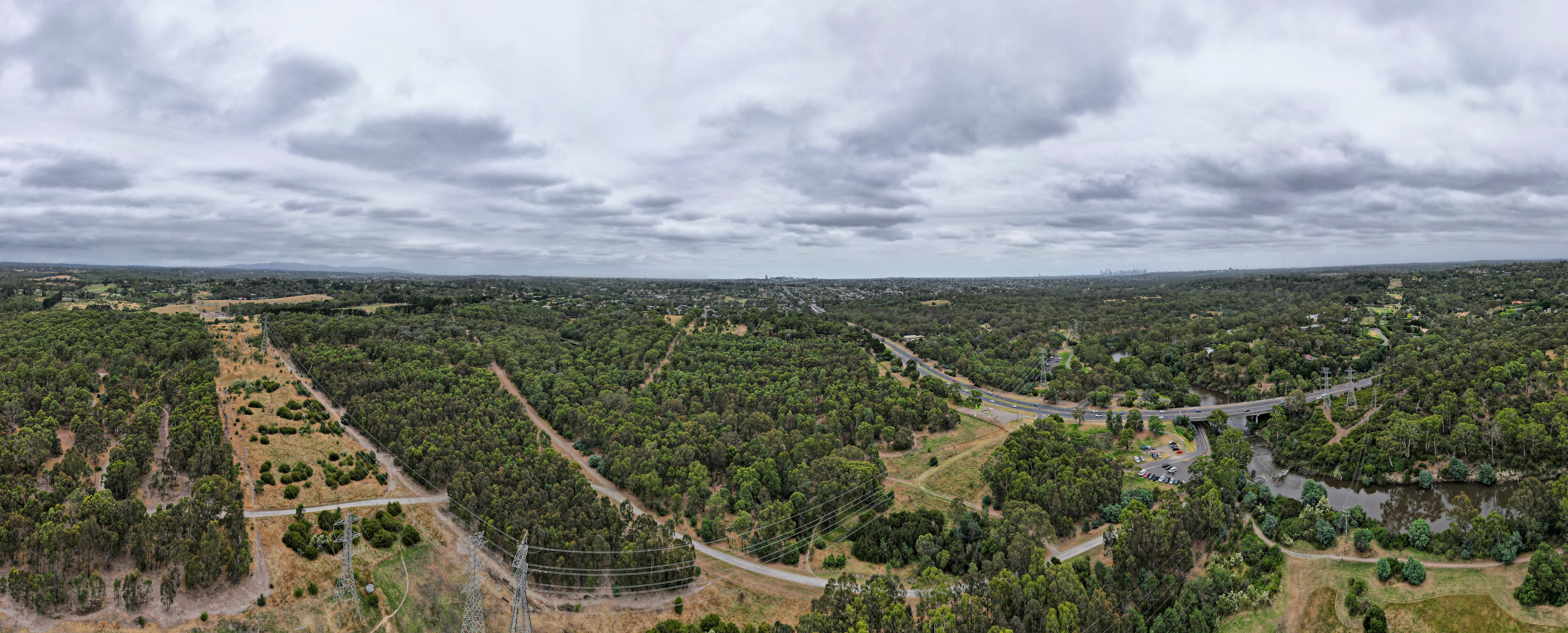
Aerial panorama of Candlebark Park alongside Fitzsimmons Reserve dog off-leash area

Templestowe is located in the north-eastern area of Melbourne. Templestowe is bordered by the Yarra River, King Street, Victoria Street, Blackburn Road and some parks.

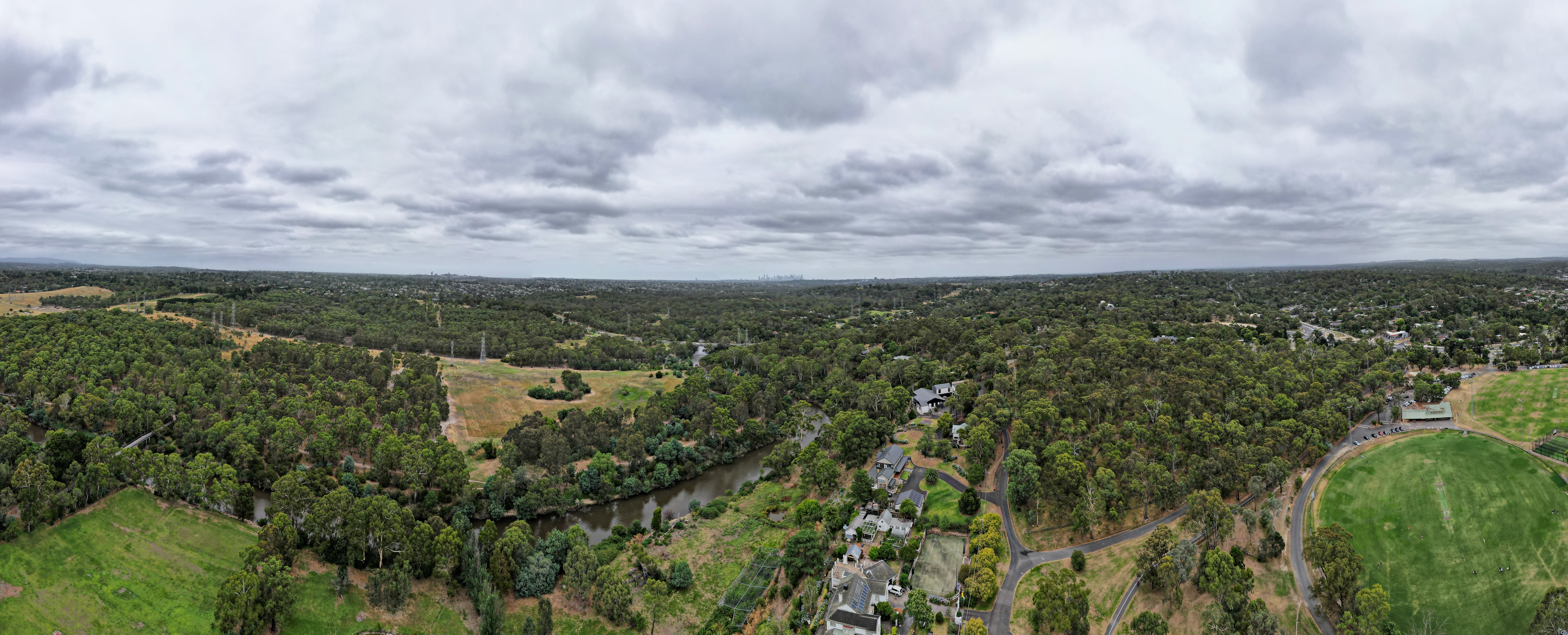
Westerfolds Park with the Melbourne city skyline on the horizon

Gentle, rolling hills extend from east of the Yarra River flood plains, along Templestowe Road (towards the Eastern Freeway) for seven km (4.3 miles), to the north-east. The altitude of the plain above sea level is 50 m, and the topography is subdued and mostly flat; the hills are just below 60 m, the slopes rounded and there are several forested gullies.

Degradation of the soils in the steep slopes at the river's edge has been exacerbated over the last century by unsustainable agricultural processes (such as the harvesting of storm-felled trees), deforestation and the introduction of rabbits. Following the 2006 drought, the community newspaper had reported several times that the population was only brought under control in 2007, 12 years after baiting programs were begun and that more conservation funding is needed to halt the loss of vegetation along the river. Most of the surrounding area has been cleared for agricultural and orchard use, although an "urban forest" exists in the densely populated rural-residential areas. There is a wide diversity of growth within the flood plain.

=== Climate ===
Most of the area corresponds to the climate recorded in Melbourne, though some variation has been recorded in the hills to the north-east.

=== Geology ===
A report from The Argus in 1923 gives rare insight to interest in the area. It had been recently accepted that "when the coastal plain is overweighted the back country rises" due to inexorable forces moulding the surface of the Earth and the so-called "Templestowe anticline" was studied as representative of microscopic faulting, which accommodated this elevation of the eastern suburbs. It was observed that the new reserve grounds established along it would become a "Mecca" for geologists:

at the better geological sections... [there are] folded rocks, which were originally soft mudstones, but now hardened by the forces induced through [lateral] pressure, often sheared and thrust out of position. The saddleback thus produced naturally opened out at the summit of the old, and the cracks that were formed w[h]ere [w]ater filled in with milky quartz veins... [are now, after being mined] full of cavities which were once occupied...

== History ==
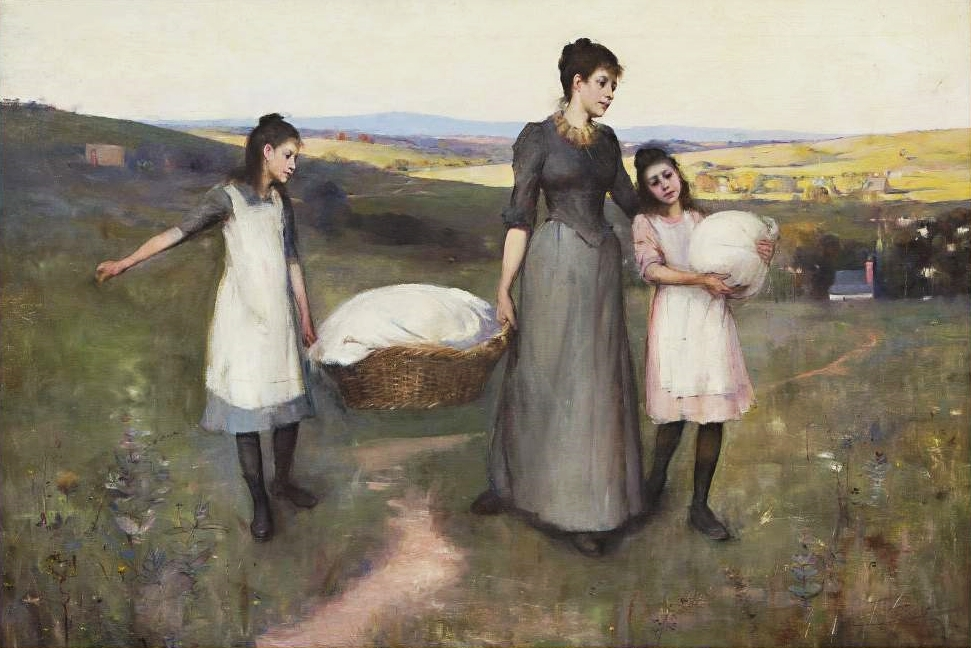
Leon Pole's 1891 painting The Village Laundress shows the Templestowe landscape.

The land to the east of Melbourne was inhabited by the Wurundjeri people, who had lived in the Yarra River Valley and its tributaries for 40,000 years. Europeans first began to settle in the mid-1830s, and George Langhorne, a missionary in Port Phillip from 1836 to 1839, noted that a substantial monetary trade with the new settlers was "well established" by 1838: "A considerable number of the Aboriginal people obtain food and clothing for themselves by shooting the Menura pheasant or Bullun-Bullun for the sake of the tails, which they sell to the whites." The increasingly rapid acquisition of guns, the lure of exotic foods and a societal emphasis on maintaining kin relationships meant they weren't attracted to the mission.

In the 1850s, the Aboriginals were granted "permissive occupancy" of Coranderrk Station, near Healesville and forcibly (Note: Green records that by the 1850s the situation had "got pretty bad for the local Aboriginals, and the [conflict over land] was brought to a head when the local First Nations people were visited by a few relatives from Drouin way. They then started to go on their traditional walkabout route, and much to the consternation of local settlers, began a corroborree at a traditional site in Bulleen, and then moved to Pound Bend [near Warrandyte] where it lasted two weeks. Troopers were ultimately called out when the tribe failed to return to their camp at Pound Bend. A number were arrested and sent to the police stockade at Dandenong. The remainder [there were no more than eighteen remaining in the district at last count, in 1862] were ultimately sent to the new Aboriginal reserve in Healesville, and Templestowe's 'Aboriginal problem' was quickly solved.") resettled. According to John Green, the Inspector of Aboriginal Stations in Victoria and later manager of Corranderrk, the people were able to achieve a "sustainable" degree of economic independence: "In the course of one week or so they will all be living in huts instead of willams [traditional housing]; they have also during that time [four months] made as many rugs, which has enabled them to buy boots, hats, coats etc., and some of them [have] even bought horses."

Around 1855, another bridge was built nearby in what is now Lower Plenty, built over the Plenty River. This bridge, made up of bluestone blocks and steel, still stands today and is part of the Plenty River Trail, close to the Heidelberg Golf Club and the Lower Plenty Hotel. It is possible that the Templestowe Bridge was similar in appearance to this.

=== Founding families ===
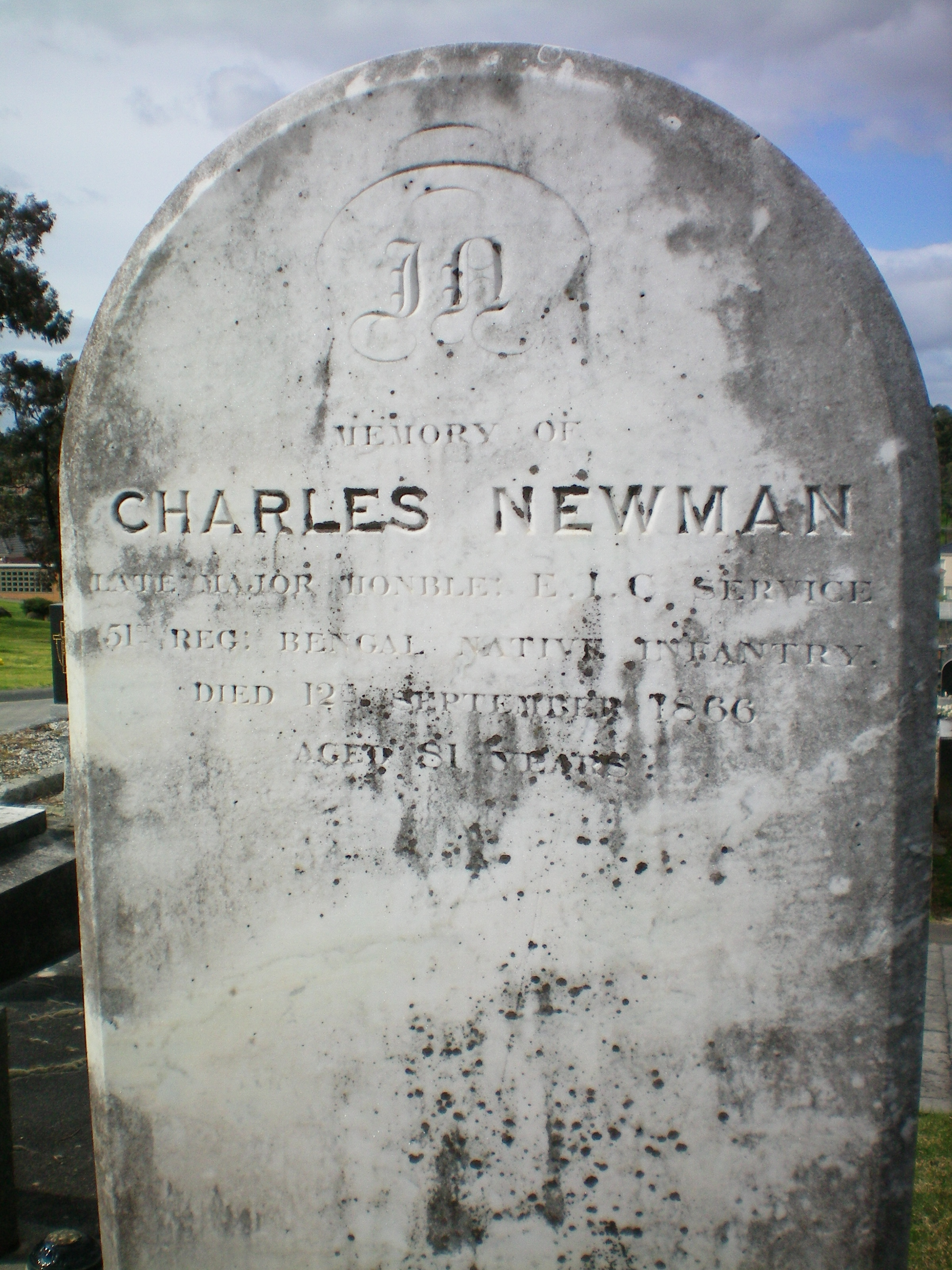
The gravestone of Major Charles Newman, relocated (Note: Seven graves of the Newman family were dug up. Poulter notes that Major Charles Newman died in 1863 aged 83 years, as recorded in his death certificate, whereas according to the tombstone he died in 1866 aged 80 years. This suggests that little attention to process was made.) to Templestowe cemetery in 1910

There was an early settlement of Irish and Scottish folk from the ship "Midlothian", through Bulleen and Templestowe, which had arrived in June 1839. The grassland there was interspersed with large Manna and River Red (Be-al) gum trees and broken up by chains of lagoons, the largest of which, called Lake Bulleen, was surrounded by impenetrable reeds that stove off attempts to drain it for irrigation. Due to the distribution of raised ground, the flats were always flooding and for a long time only the poorest (non-English) immigrants leased "pastoral" land from Unwins Special Survey, the estate of the Port Phillip District Authority. Hence, although far from prosperous, the farmers living close to nature, most were independent, such that a private Presbyterian school (Note: Which did not qualify for Government aid.) was begun for the district in 1843.

==== Pontville Homestead ====
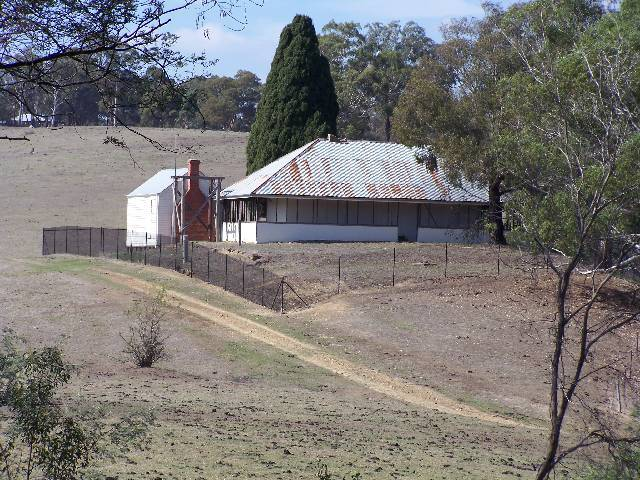
Pontville Homestead

Pontville is historically and aesthetically significant amongst the early towns, as its landscape contributes to the greater understanding of 1840s agricultural and garden history, as well as for containing numerous relics of aboriginal life. The survival of its formal garden terracing and the presence Hawthorn hedgerows, used for fencing, is unusual (with an historical account from Tasmania noting the huge difficulties and costs resulting in the rarity of such plantings in the early 1800s).

The property itself (now subdivided) has several remnant plantings of the colonial era, including Himalayan Cypress, Black Mulberry and willow trees, and the land preserves the integrity of ancient scar trees, ancestral camping sites and other spirit places of the Wurundjeri people. They can be observed in their original form along the trail systems, at the Tikalara ("meeting place") plains tract of the Mullum-Mullum Creek.

Pontville is archaeologically important for the below ground remains inherent in the location of, and the material contained within the archaeological deposits associated with Newman's turf hut and the subsequent homestead building, cottage, associated farm and rubbish deposits. The structures, deposits and associated artefacts are important for their potential to provide an understanding of the conditions in which a squatting family lived in the earliest days of the Port Phillip settlement.

=== Namesake ===
The name Templestowe was chosen when a village was proclaimed. Its exact origins are unknown, although a "Templestowe" is mentioned in the book Ivanhoe by Sir Walter Scott – supposedly modelled after the Temple Newsam preceptory at Leeds. As the village of Ivanhoe was settled immediately prior to Templestowe, it is believed by some that the name was chosen to preserve the literary parallel.

Templestowe Post Office opened on 1 July 1860.

=== Development ===
The "River Peel" sculpture was installed in 2001, as part of the Manningham City Gateway Sculpture Project.

Until the expansionism of the 1970s, Templestowe was scarcely populated. Additionally, it was then part of the so-called "green belt" of Melbourne and subdivision into less than 20,000 m^{2} (2 hectares) was not possible in many parts of the suburb.

== Transport ==
Templestowe is served by many bus routes, serving destinations including the Melbourne central business district to the south-west, Box Hill and Blackburn in the south, and Greensborough in the east.

In the late 2000s, extensive improvements were made to the bus network serving Templestowe under the SmartBus and its associated Doncaster Area Rapid Transit project. Notably, SmartBus 905 (City - The Pines via Templestowe) was introduced to connect Templestowe to the Melbourne CBD. This route is one of very few in Melbourne running frequently (every 15 minutes) all-week.

Lying between two of Melbourne's suburban rail lines, (the Hurstbridge and Belgrave/Lilydale lines), the State Government planned a rail line in the 1970s, running down the middle of the Eastern Freeway, and then veering away from the freeway towards Templestowe. However, the land acquired for the off-freeway section was sold in the 1980s.

== Education ==
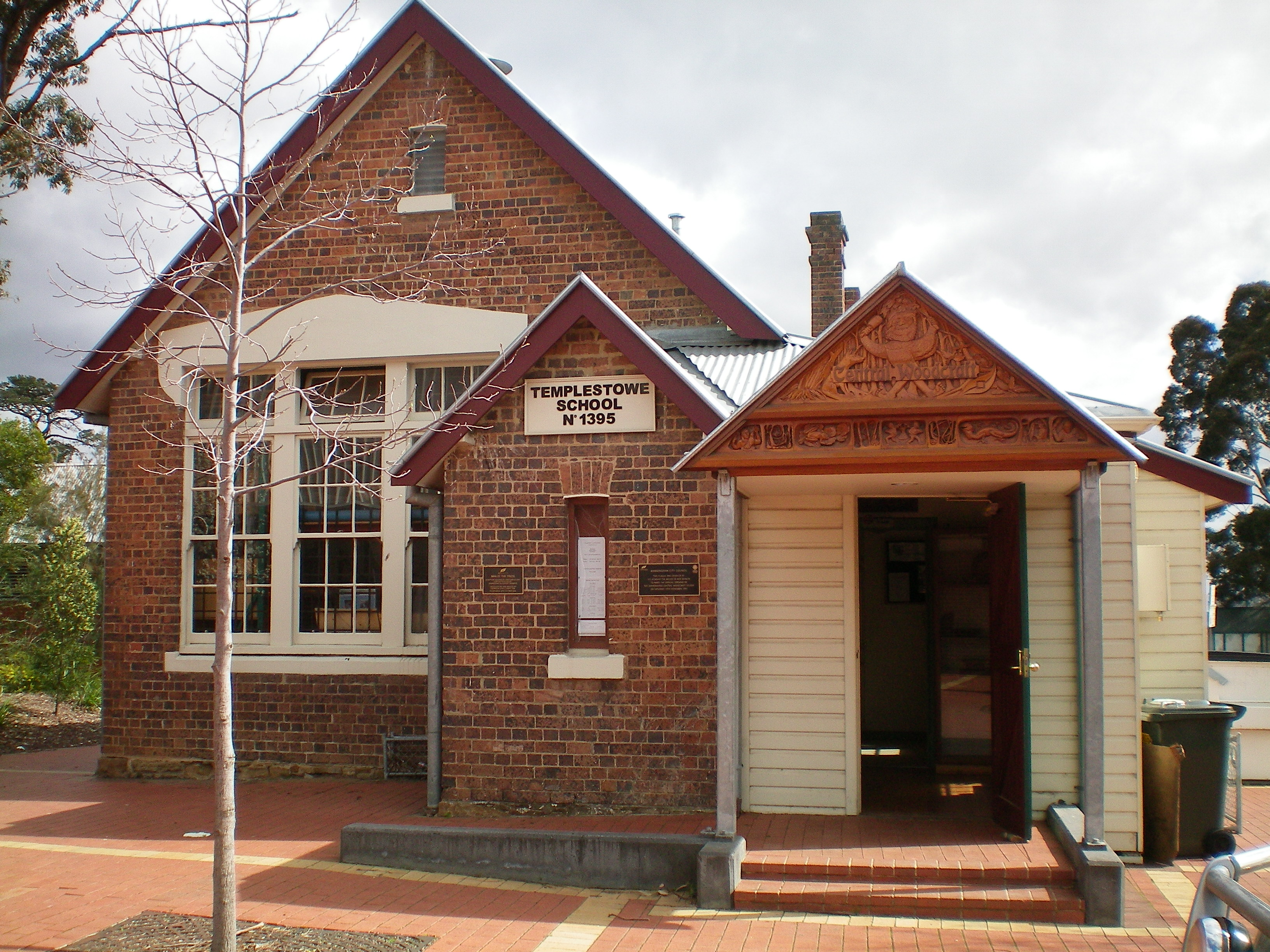
Templestowe School catered for generations of settlers. Initially there were schools for various religious denominations, culminating in the establishment of a common (state) school, off Foote Street

There are currently five state schools (Serpell, Templestowe Heights, Templestowe Park and Templestowe Valley) and two Catholic schools (Saint Charles Borromeo and Saint Kevin's), providing primary education to the suburb. Templestowe College serves some of the demand for secondary education. However, Templestowe College, Templestowe Valley Primary School, St Kevins PS and Templestowe Heights PS are located either on the border of Templestowe and Templestowe Lower or in Templestowe Lower.

== Sport ==
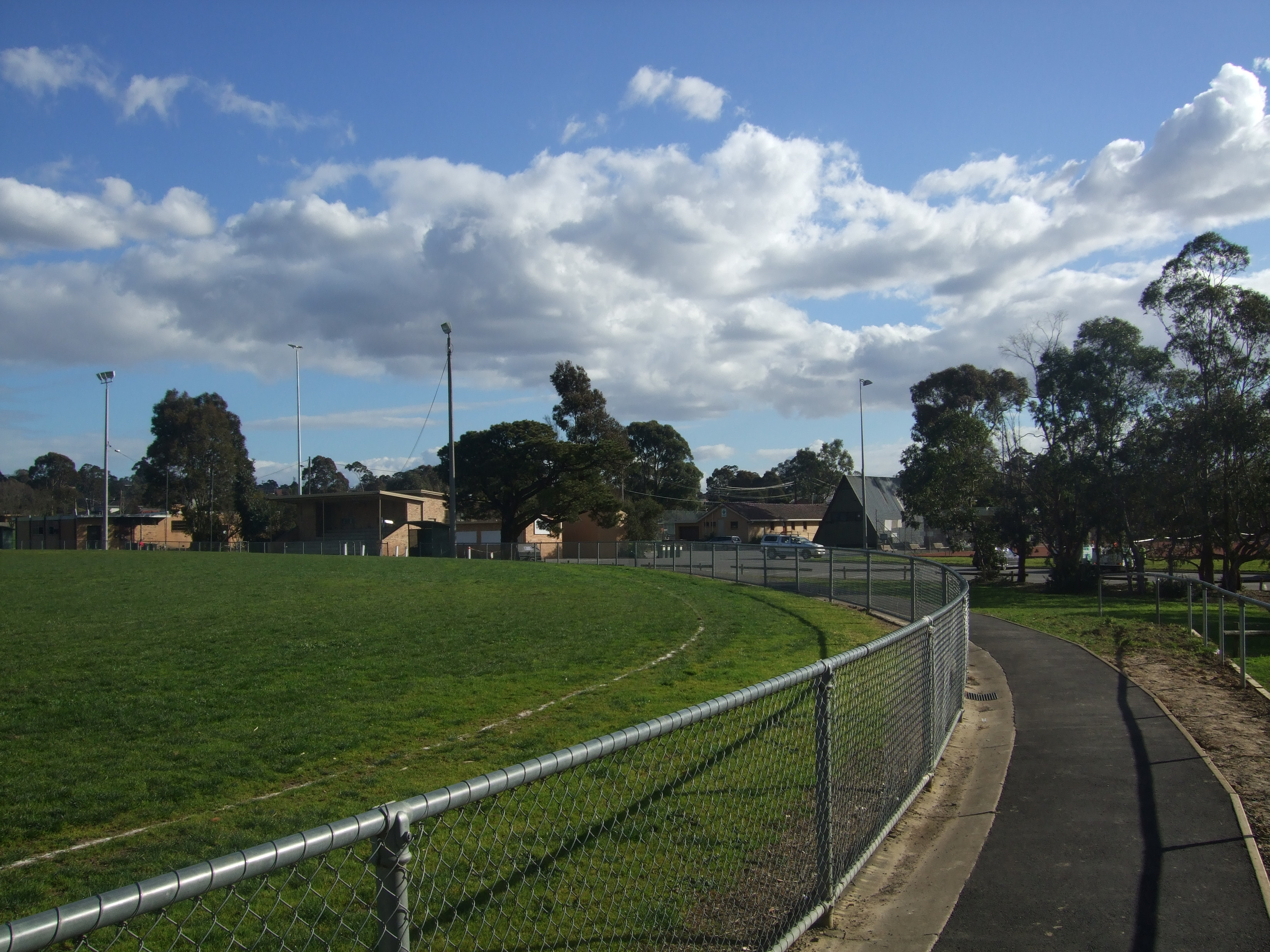
Sporting facilities at Templestowe Reserve, tennis courts are observable in the background, beyond the stand of trees

The suburb has two Australian Rules football teams, the Templestowe Dockers and Bulleen Bullants both compete in the Eastern Football League.

The Bulleen Templestowe Amateur Football Club previously competed in the Victorian Amateur Football Association (VAFA). The "Bullants" had premiership success at senior level (2004, 2008, 2012). The Reserves side were also Premiers in 2012, and the Under 19's were Premiers in 2011. The club were promoted to Division 1 of the Victorian Amateur Football Association for the 2013 season.

The suburb also had a cricket team, the Templestowe Cricket Club, competing in the Box Hill Reporter District Cricket Association. The two football clubs and the cricket club share use of the Templestowe Reserve.

Manningham United FC also has a rich history. The Templestowe located club has been around since 1965, including winning the Dockerty Cup in 1984 when they were known as Fawkner. Manningham is currently the only soccer club located in Templestowe. Although there is a club called Templestowe United, it is actually located in Bulleen.

== Notable people ==
- Laura Brock - soccer player
- Karmein Chan - murdered girl
- Percy Chivers - cricketer
- David Davies - artist
- Roland Duncan - Australian rules footballer
- Alphonse Gangitano - criminal
- Matthew Guy - politician
- Brian Quinn - businessman

== See also ==
- City of Doncaster and Templestowe – Templestowe was previously within this former local government area.
