= Mullum =

Mullum may refer to:

- Mullum-Mullum Creek, creek in the outer eastern suburbs of Melbourne, Victoria, Australia
  - Mullum Mullum Creek Linear Park, east of Melbourne, Australia in the suburbs of Doncaster East and Donvale
  - Mullum Mullum Creek Trail, shared use path for cyclists and pedestrians in the outer eastern suburbs in Melbourne, Victoria, Australia

== See also ==
- Mullum Malarum, a 1978 Indian Tamil-language film by J. Mahendran
