= City of Manningham =

Coordinates: 37°46′S 145°12′E

- Local government area
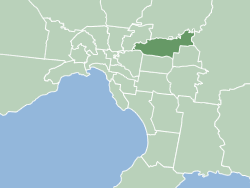
- Balance of City and Country

- Interactive map of City of Manningham
- Country: Australia
- State: Victoria
- Region: Greater Melbourne
- Established: 1994
- Council seat: Doncaster

Government
  - Mayor: Cr Deirdre Diamante
  - State electorates: Bulleen; Ringwood; Warrandyte
  - Federal divisions: Casey; Deakin; Menzies

Area
  - Total: 113 km^{2} (44 sq mi)

Population
  - Total: 125,508 (2018)
  - Density: 1,111/km^{2} (2,877/sq mi)
- Website: City of Manningham
LGAs around City of Manningham
Banyule	Nillumbik	Yarra Ranges
Banyule	City of Manningham	Yarra Ranges
Boroondara	Whitehorse	Maroondah

The City of Manningham is a local government area in Victoria, Australia in the north-eastern suburbs of Melbourne and is divided into 12 suburbs, with the largest being Doncaster and Doncaster East. It comprises an area of 113 square kilometres and had a population of 125,508 in June 2018.

The district spans a roughly east–west direction along the southern banks of the Yarra River and across the undulating valleys of the Koonung, Ruffey and Mullum Mullum Creeks, alternating from typical low density suburban housing in the west to remnant bushland, within a green wedge, in the east. As such, the district encompasses the transition between the built and natural environments in Melbourne's east and promotes itself as a "balance of city and country".

Formerly the City of Doncaster & Templestowe, the district is situated in the Wurundjeri nation's territory. Most of the first European settlers to the area were orchardists, arriving through the 1850s. Gold was first discovered in Victoria around the same time at Andersons Creek, in Warrandyte, however, the district saw varied growth as periods of low density suburban development occurred sporadically throughout the mid-late 20th century.

== History ==
The Manningham municipality was created on 15 December 1994, as part of a general restructure of Melbourne's local government boundaries. The new municipality contains the former City of Doncaster & Templestowe, but with part of Ringwood North ceded to the new City of Maroondah and Wonga Park, annexed from the former Shire of Lillydale.

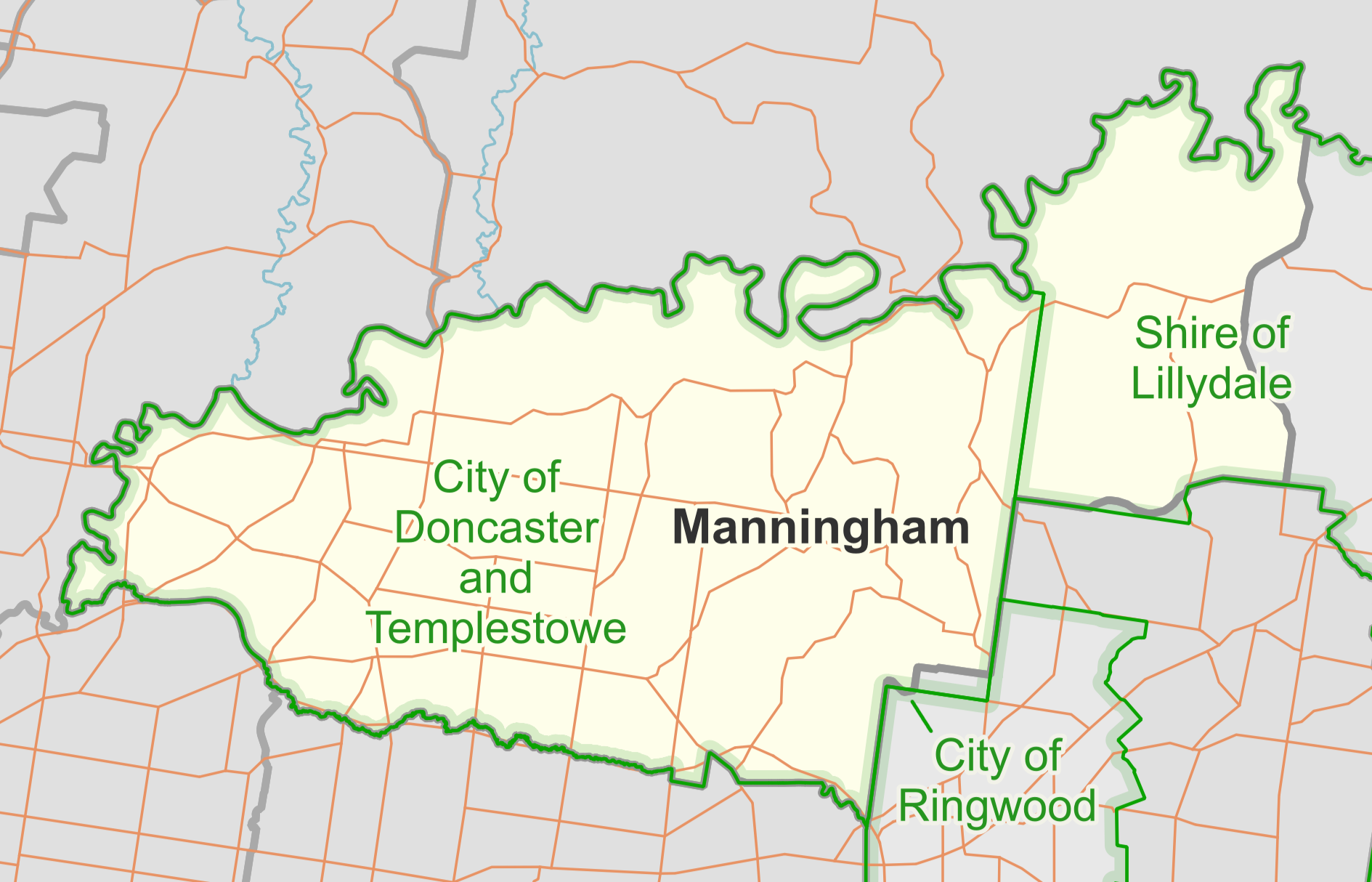
The City of Manningham's predecessor LGAs (green) as they were in 1994

The name Bulleen, a nearby suburb, was proposed for the new municipality, as it was the name of the shire predating the City of Doncaster and Templestowe. However, modern residents believed the name was too localised, so the name of one of the major roads was adopted. Manningham Road gets its name from the Manningham area of Bradford, West Yorkshire, England. Residents' requests for the City to be named after Indigenous Australian names local to the area such as Mullum Mullum or Koonung were rejected.

== Geography ==
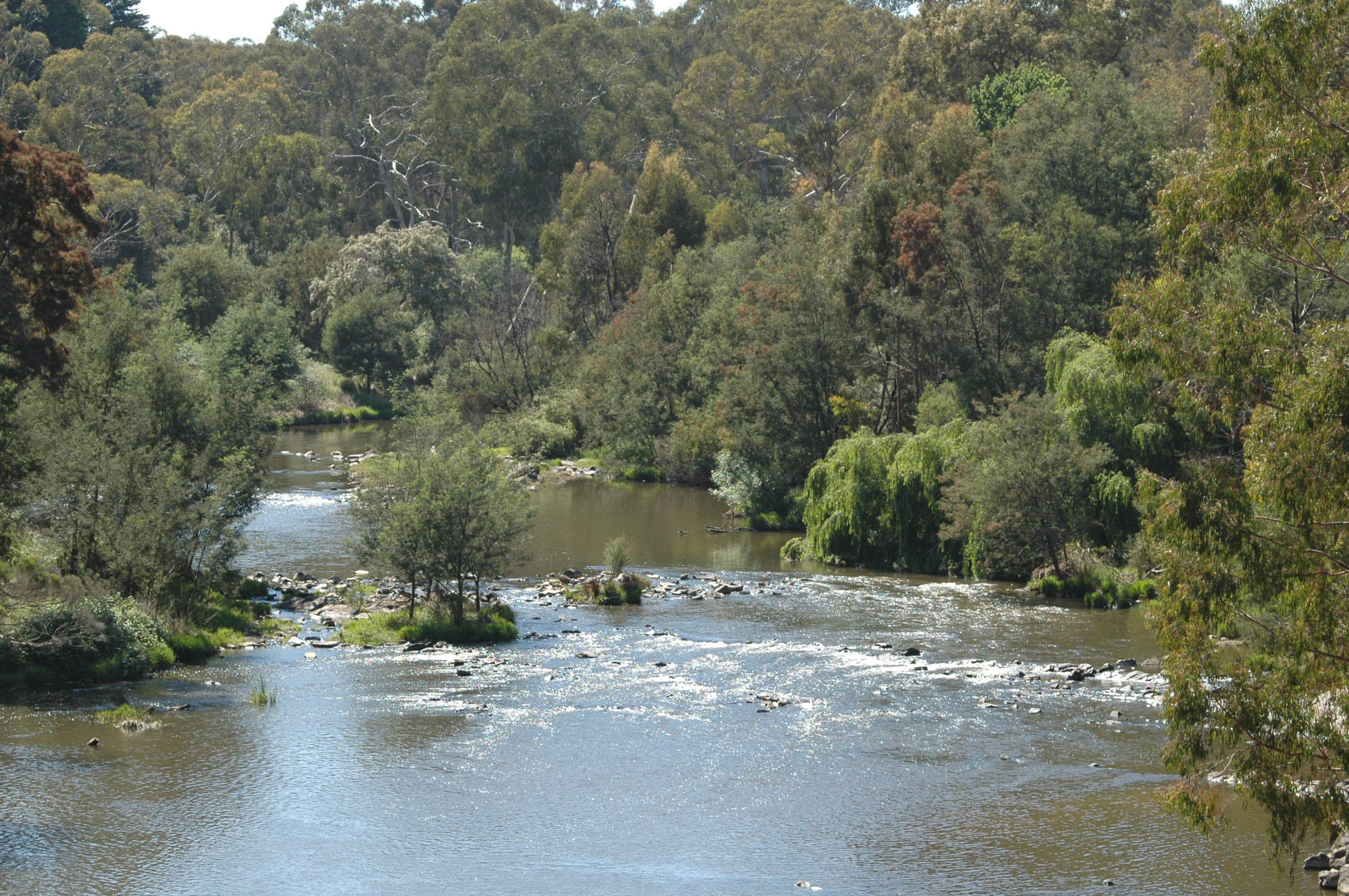
Mullum Mullum Creek in Victoria, Australia

The main watercourses that border or flow through the City of Manningham include:

- Yarra River
- Mullum Mullum Creek
- Koonung Creek
- Ruffey Creek
- Anderson's Creek
- Hopping Creek
- Jumping Creek
- Skipping Creek

== Council ==
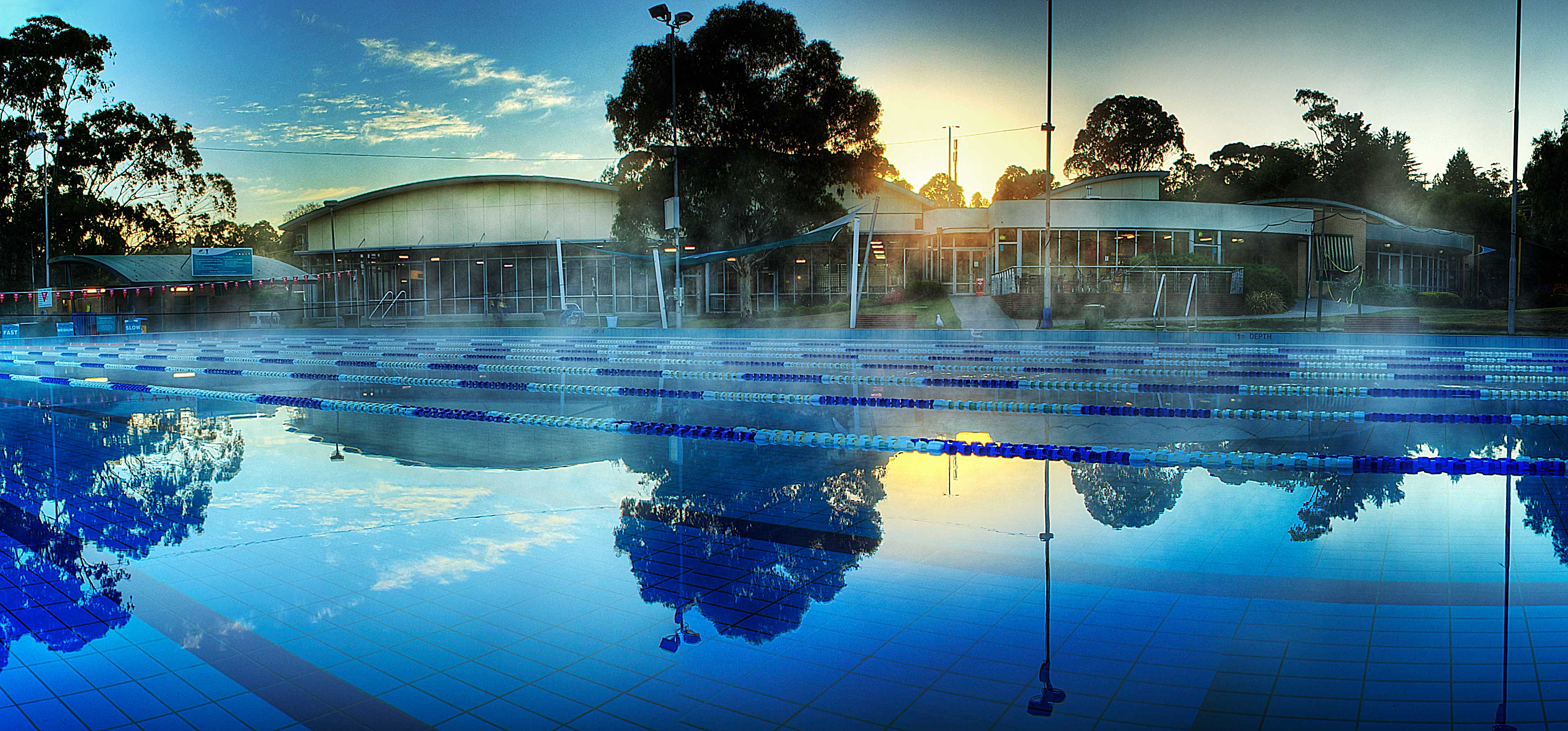
Aquarena Aquatic and Leisure Centre located in Templestowe Lower, Victoria, Australia

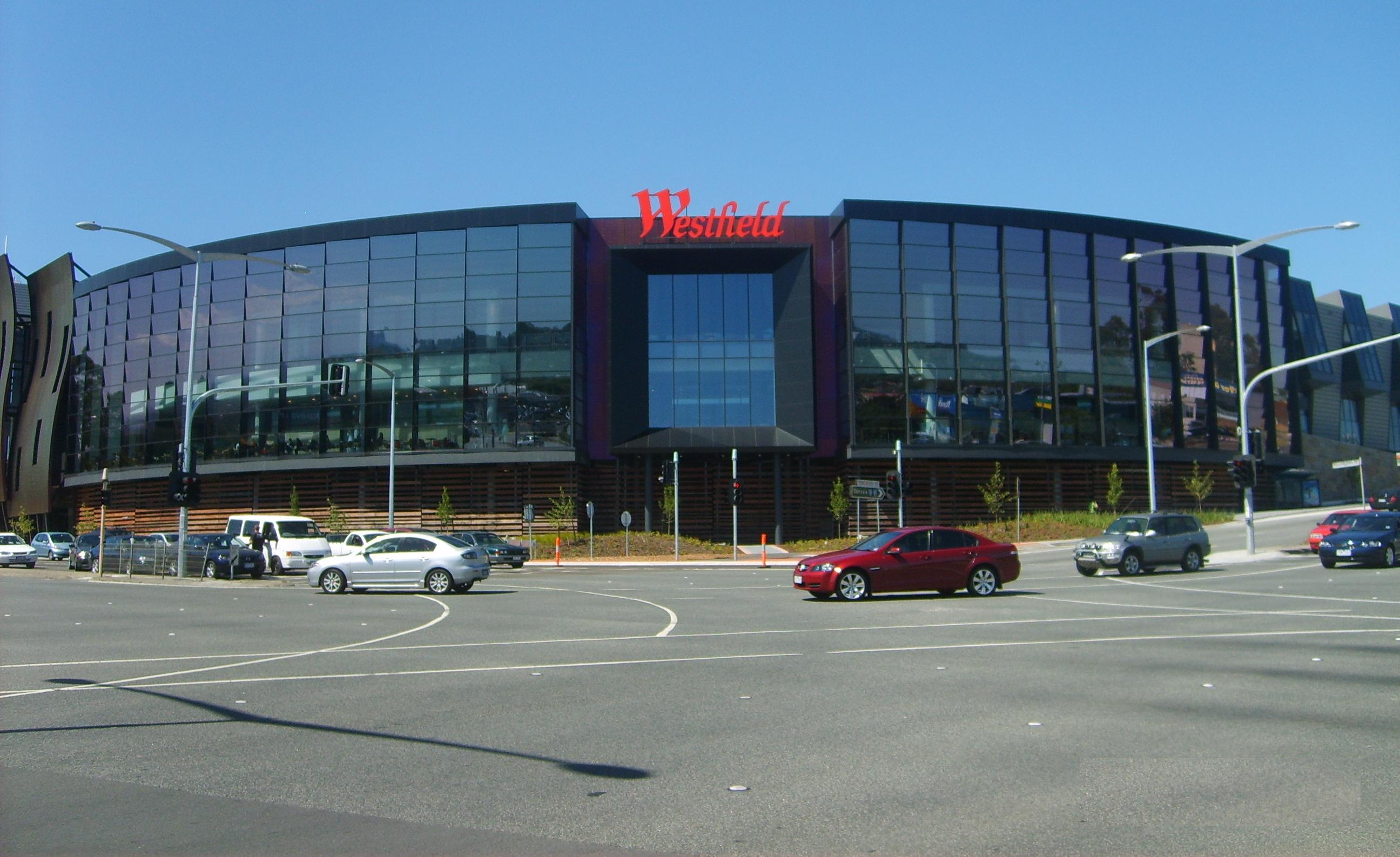
Doncaster Shoppingtown, redeveloped in 2008

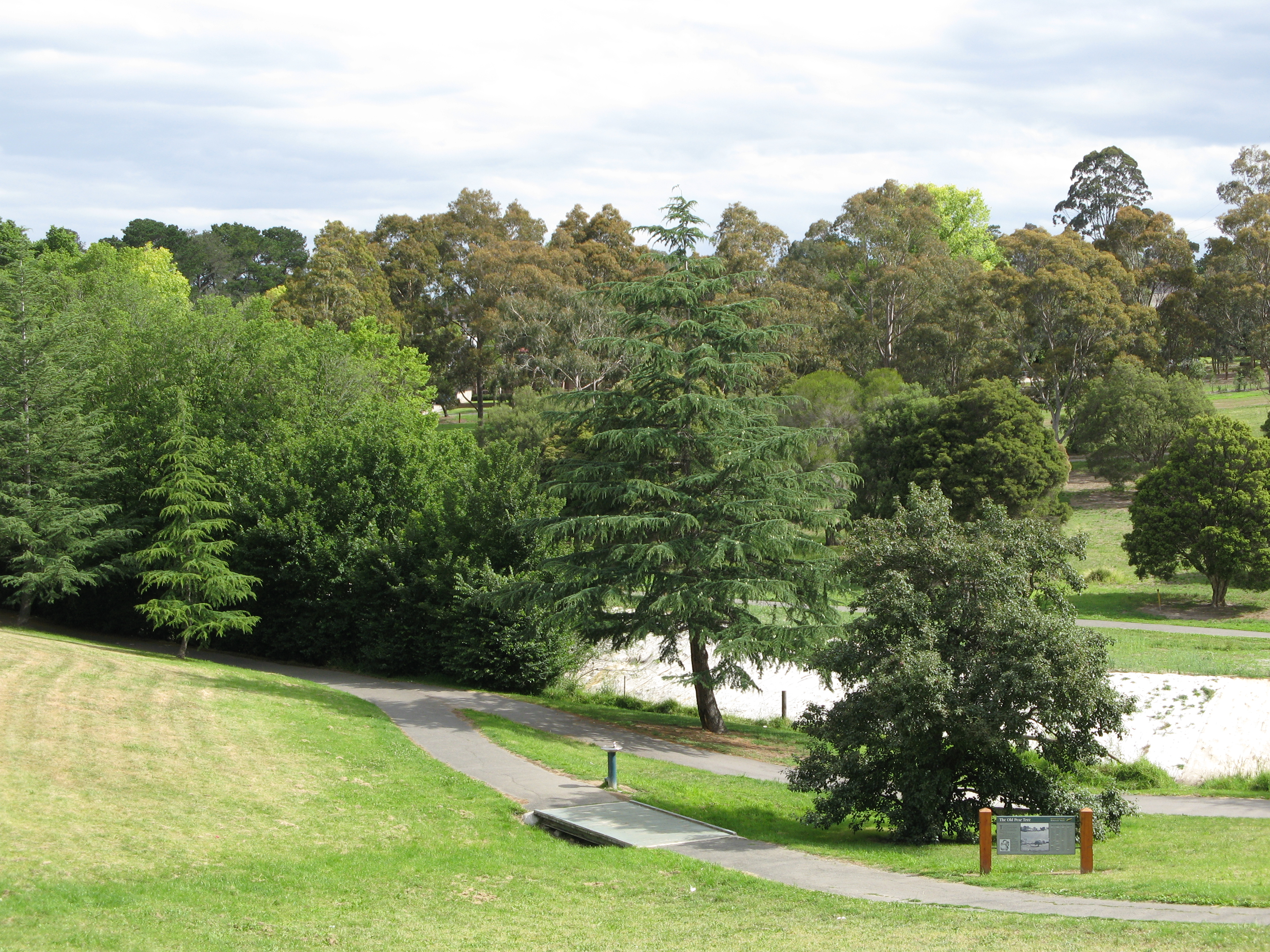
Ruffey Lake Park

Manningham was divided into four wards electing two councillors each until 2008.

From 2008 to 2020, Manningham was divided into three wards, with three councillors elected for each ward. Following reforms to the Local Government Act in 2020, Manningham was divided into 9 wards, each electing one Councillor. Councillors are elected by the community for a four-year term following an election.

The council, as of October 2024, is:

Ward	Party	Councillor	Notes
Bolin	Independent Liberal	Geoff Gough	
Currawong	Independent Liberal	Andrew Conlon	Deputy Mayor
Manna	Independent Liberal	Peter Bain	
Ruffey	Independent Liberal	Peter Grivas	
Schramm	Independent	Laura Mayne	
Tullamore	Independent Liberal	Deirdre Diamante	Mayor
Waldau	Independent	Anna Chen	
Westerfolds	Independent	Isabella Eltaha	
Yarra	Independent	Carli Lange	

=== Federal electorate ===
The Federal electorate of Menzies covers much of the City of Manningham. It has been held by the Federal Liberal Party since 1984 until 2025. The seat has since held by the Australian Labor Party.

=== State electorates ===
The City of Manningham encompasses the two Victorian state electorates of Bulleen and Warrandyte, both of which been held predominantly by the Liberal Party.

== Past councillors ==
=== 2020−2024 (single-member wards) ===
Ward	Party	Councillor	Notes
Bolin	Liberal	Geoff Gough	
Currawong	Liberal	Andrew Conlon	Mayor 2020/21
Manna	Victorian Greens	Tomas Lightbody	Deputy Mayor 2022/23
Ruffey	Independent	Stephen Mayne	
Schramm	Independent	Laura Mayne	Deputy Mayor 2023/24
Tullamore	Liberal	Deirdre Diamante	Mayor 2022/23
Waldau	Independent	Anna Chen	Deputy Mayor (2020/21)
Westerfolds	Liberal	Michelle Kleinert	Mayor 2021/22
Yarra	Independent	Carli Lange	Mayor 2023/24

=== 2000−2020 (multi-member wards) ===
==== Heide Ward ====
Year	Councillor	Party	Councillor	Party	Councillor	Party
2000	Geoff Gough	Liberal	John Bruce	Independent	2 members (2000−2008)	
2003	Geoff Gough	Liberal	John Bruce	Independent	2 members (2000−2008)	
2005	Geoff Gough	Liberal	Grace La Vella	Independent	2 members (2000−2008)	
2008	Geoff Gough	Liberal	Grace La Vella	Independent	Stephen Mayne	Independent
2012	Geoff Gough	Liberal	Michelle Kleinert	Liberal	Jim Grivokostopoulos	Liberal
2016	Geoff Gough	Liberal	Michelle Kleinert	Liberal	Jim Grivokostopoulos	Liberal

==== Koonung Ward ====
Year	Councillor	Party	Councillor	Party	Councillor	Party
2000	Irene Goonan	Independent	Bill Larkin	Independent	2 members (2000−2008)	
2003	Katerina Karanikolopoulos	Independent	Bill Larkin	Independent	2 members (2000−2008)	
2005	Warren Welsh	Independent	Bill Larkin	Independent	2 members (2000−2008)	
2008	Charles Pick	Independent	Ivan Reid	Labor	Fred Chuah	Independent
2011	Jessica Villarreal	Independent	Ivan Reid	Labor	Jennifer Yang	Labor
2012	Stephen O'Brien	Independent	Dot Haynes	Independent	Jennifer Yang	Labor
2016	Anna Chen	Independent	Dot Haynes	Independent	Mike Zafiropoulos	Independent

==== Mullum Mullum Ward ====
Year	Councillor	Party	Councillor	Party	Councillor	Party
2000	Lionel Allemand	Independent	Patricia Young	Independent	2 members (2000−2008)	
2003	Gerard Dale	Independent	Patricia Young	Independent	2 members (2000−2008)	
2005	Ron Kitchingman	Liberal	Patricia Young	Independent	2 members (2000−2008)	
2008	Meg Downie	Labor	David Ellis	Independent	Graeme Macmillan	Independent
2012	Meg Downie	Labor	Paul McLeish	Independent	Sophy Galbally	Independent
2016	Andrew Conlon	Liberal	Paul McLeish	Independent	Sophy Galbally	Independent

==== Ruffey Ward (2000−2008) ====
Year	Councillor	Party	Councillor	Party
2000	Bob Beynon	Independent	Julie Eisenbise	Independent
2003	Bob Beynon	Independent	Julie Eisenbise	Independent
2005	Melanie Randall	Independent	Charles Pick	Independent

== Townships and localities ==
The city had a population of 124,700 at the 2021 census, up from 116,255 at the 2016 census.

Population
Locality	2016	2021
Bulleen	10,873	11,219
Doncaster	20,946	25,020
Doncaster East	28,360	30,926
Donvale	12,347	12,644
Nunawading^	11,876	12,413
Park Orchards^	3,822	3,835
Ringwood North^	9,832	9,964
Templestowe	16,618	16,966
Templestowe Lower	13,429	14,098
Warrandyte	5,502	5,541
Warrandyte South	671	671
Wonga Park^	3,796	3,843

^ - Territory divided with another LGA

== Parklands ==
Parklands cover approximately 70 per cent of the municipality and include a range of open spaces, from large conservation areas to smaller local parks. Major parks include:

- Warrandyte State Park – Warrandyte and Wonga Park
- Westerfolds Park – Templestowe
- Candlebark Park – Templestowe
- Tikalara Park – Templestowe
- Ruffey Lake Park – Doncaster and Templestowe
- Currawong Bush Park – Warrandyte
- Birrarung Park – Templestowe Lower and Bulleen
- Buck Reserve – Donvale
- The 100 Acres – Park Orchards
- Mullum Mullum Creek Linear Park – Doncaster East and Donvale

== Education ==
Primary Schools – Public (14)

- Andersons Creek Primary School, Warrandyte
- Warrandyte Primary School, Warrandyte
- Templestowe Heights Primary School, Templestowe Lower
- Templestowe Park Primary School, Templestowe
- Templestowe Valley Primary School, Templestowe
- Serpell Primary School, Templestowe
- Birralee Primary School, Doncaster
- Doncaster Primary School, Doncaster
- Doncaster Gardens Primary School, Doncaster East
- Milgate Primary School, Doncaster East
- Donburn Primary School, Doncaster East
- Beverley Hills Primary School, Doncaster East
- Donvale Primary School, Donvale
- Park Orchards Primary School, Park Orchards

Primary Schools – Private (9)

- St Clement of Rome Catholic Primary School, Bulleen
- St Gregory the Great Catholic Primary School, Doncaster
- Ss Peter & Paul's Catholic Primary School, Doncaster East
- Carey Baptist Grammar School, Donvale
- Our Lady of the Pines Catholic Primary School, Donvale
- St Anne's Catholic Primary School, Park Orchards
- St Charles Borromeo Catholic Primary School, Templestowe
- St Kevin's Catholic Primary School, Templestowe

Secondary Schools – Public (4)

- Doncaster Secondary College, Doncaster
- East Doncaster Secondary College, Doncaster East
- Templestowe College, Templestowe Lower
- Warrandyte High School, Warrandyte

Secondary Schools – Private (2)

- Marcellin College, Bulleen
- Whitefriars College

Other (2)

- Bulleen Heights School, Bulleen
- Donvale Christian College

Libraries (4)

All libraries in the Manningham area are operated by the Whitehorse Manningham Regional Library Corporation.

Manningham Libraries include:

- Doncaster Library – MC Square, 687 Doncaster Rd, Doncaster, VIC 3108
- The Pines Library – The Pines Shopping Centre, Cnr Blackburn and Reynolds Road, Doncaster East, VIC 3109
- Warrandyte Library – 168 Yarra St, Warrandyte VIC 3113
- Bulleen Library – Bulleen Plaza, 79–109 Manningham Road, Bulleen, VIC 3105

== Transport ==
Manningham is the only area in metropolitan Melbourne without a train line or tram route and therefore the area is heavily reliant on private cars. A Doncaster railway line had been planned for many decades; however the land was sold off in the 1980s. Residents have long campaigned for extension of the route 48 tram along Doncaster Road to Doncaster, Doncaster East or Donvale, although this is heavily supported by Local Governments, the issue has been consistently avoided by State Government.

There are increased bus services to cope with the demand for public transport, including four radial SmartBus routes, and two exclusive Manningham Mover circular routes. Most routes are operated by Kinetic Melbourne, which has a depot in Doncaster East, near the intersection of Blackburn and Doncaster Roads.

=== Major roadways ===
- Andersons Creek Road (State Route 13)
- Blackburn Road (State Route 13)
- Bulleen Road (State Route 52)
- Croydon Road (State Route 7)
- Doncaster Road (State Route 36 / State Route 40)
- Eastern Freeway (M3)
- Elgar Road
- High Street
- Fitzsimons Lane (B37)
- Foote Street (State Route 42 / State Route 52)
- King Street
- Jumping Creek Road (State Route 42)
- Manningham Road (State Route 40)
- Mitcham Road (State Route 36 / State Route 40)
- Northern Route:
  - Reynolds Road (State Route 52)
  - Tindals Road
  - Falconer Road
  - Stintons Road
- Park Road
- Springvale Road (State Route 40 / State Route 52)
- Templestowe Road (State Route 52)
- Thompsons Road (State Route 42)
- Tram Road (State Route 47)
- Warrandyte Road:
  - Heidelberg-Warrandyte Road (State Route 13)
  - Warrandyte-Ringwood Road (State Route 9 / State Route 42)
- Wetherby Road (State Route 23)
- Williamsons Road (State Route 47 / B37)

== Notable residents ==
- Charles "Bud" Tingwell (died 2009)
- Karl von Möller – Australian Cinematographer, Director
- Alisa Camplin – Aerial skier, Olympic gold medallist
- Michele Timms – Basketballer, Olympic silver medallist
- Brendon Smith – Swimmer, Olympic bronze medallist
- Stephen Mayne – Journalist, Councillor for Heide Ward from 2008 to 2011
- Jade Rawlings – Former AFL player
- Mark "Jacko" Jackson – AFL Footballer and Actor
- Greg Evans – Australian television presenter
- Kim Crow, Olympic rower
- Scott Martin, an Australian shot putter, who is best known for appearing on Commonwealth Bank TV advertisements, which aired during the 2006 Commonwealth Games.
- Mark Wilson – Ran a dance studio on Thompsons Road in Templestowe until it was burnt down in 2008.
- Roy Robbins-Browne – Professor Roy Robins-Browne was appointed an Officer of the Order (AO) “For distinguished service to education and research in the field of microbiology and immunology and to professional groups” on 26 January, as announced in the Australia Day 2020 Honours List
- Inaam Barakat – awarded the Medal of the Order of Australia in 2023, Inaam Barakat is acknowledged for working for disadvantaged people.

== See also ==
- List of Melbourne suburbs
