= Currawong Bush Park =

Riparian bushland park in Melbourne, Victoria, Australia

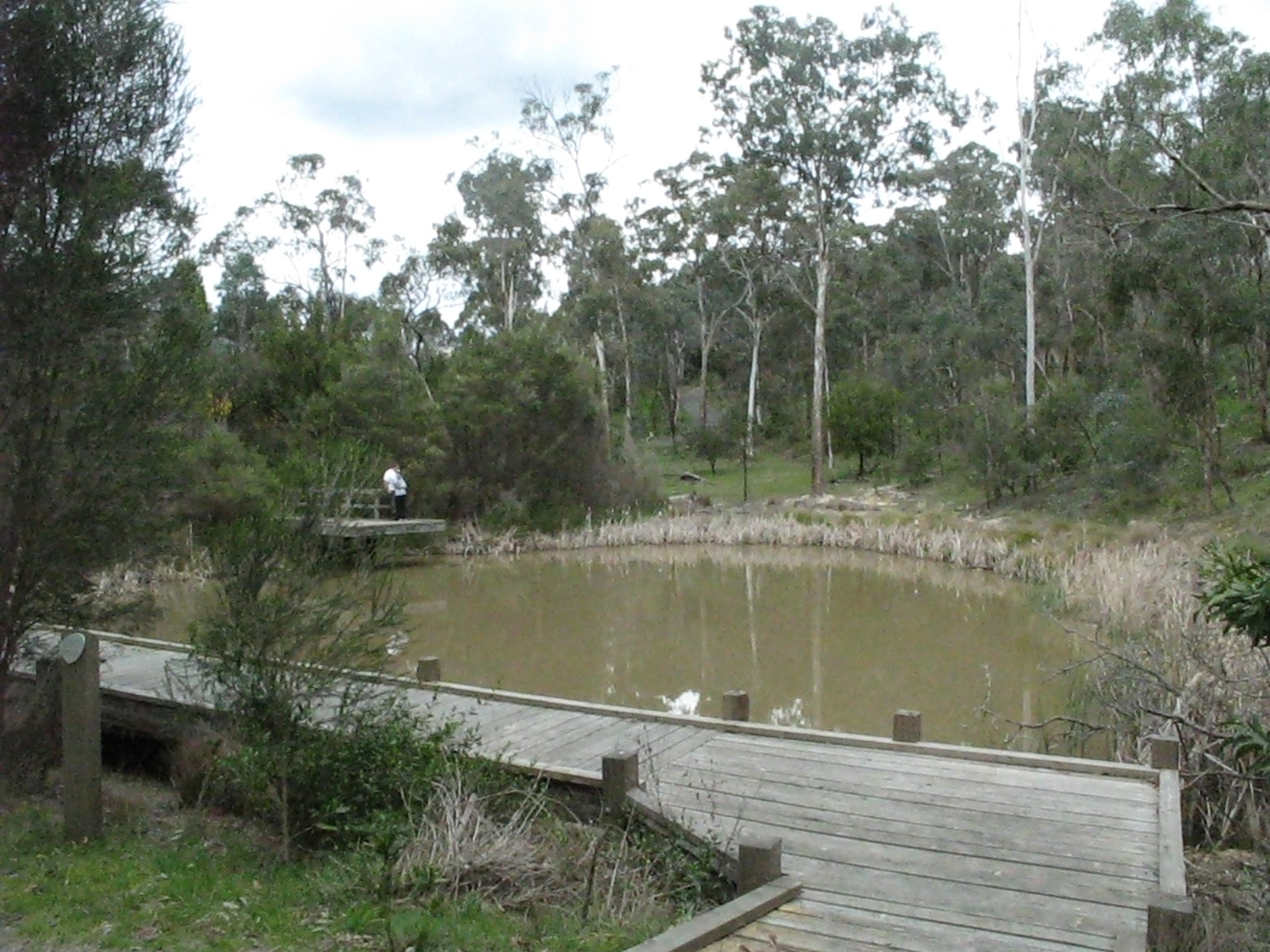
- Millers Pond in Currawong Bush Park
- Interactive map of Currawong Bush Park
- Type: Public Park
- Location: Melbourne
- Coordinates: 37.7612°S 145.1839°E
- Area: 59 hectares (150 acres)
- Opened: 1970's
- Operator: City of Manningham
- Visitors: 750 per month approx.
- Status: Open
- Paths: Unsealed bush paths
- Terrain: Remnant Riparian Bushland
- Water: Mullum Mullum Creek, Millers Pond, Billy Baxter Wetlands, Go-Betweens Gully, Amersham Gully
- Vegetation: Australian Native
- Landmarks: Mullum Mullum Creek, Scar Trees
- Facilities: Toilets, Barbecues, Picnic areas, Conference room, Education centre, Wildlife sanctuary

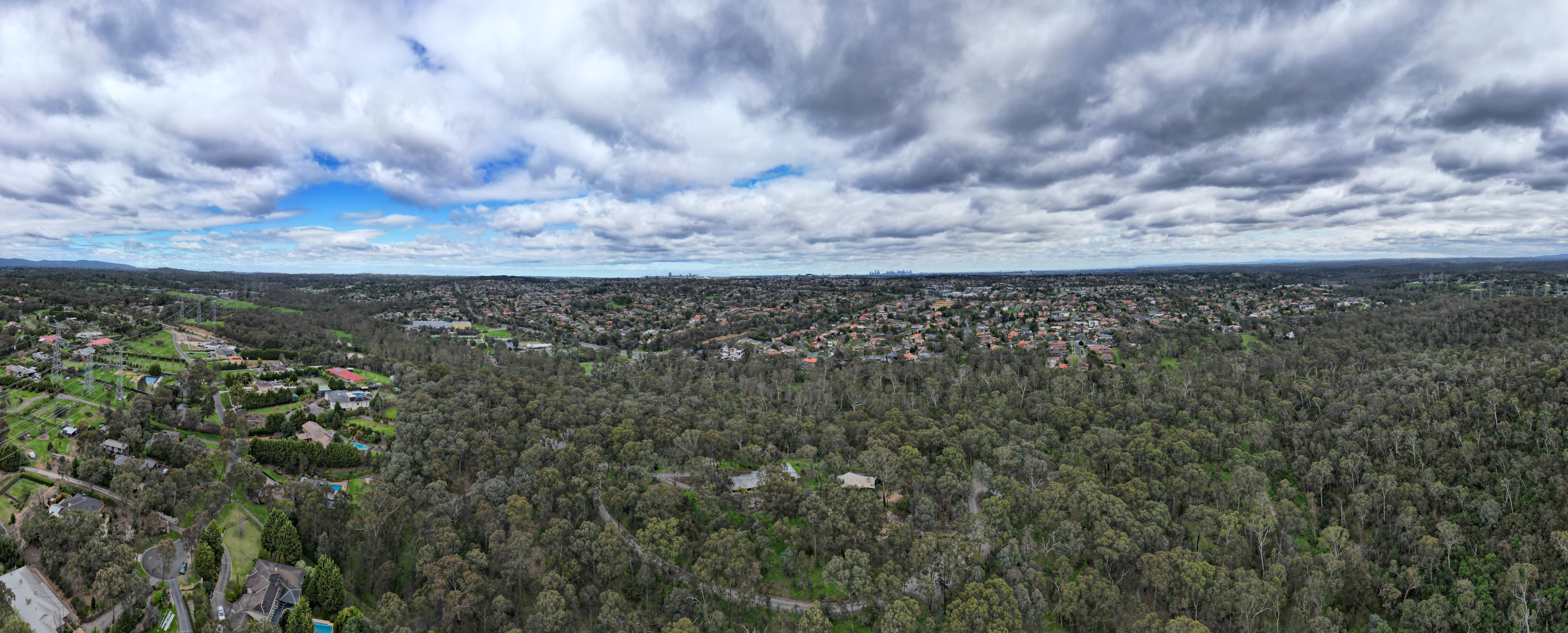
Aerial panorama of Currawong Bush Park facing west to Melbourne city

Currawong Bush Park is a nature park located in the outer eastern Melbourne suburbs of Doncaster East, Warrandyte and Donvale, along Mullum Creek. It covers 59 hectares of remnant bushland and contains archaeological sites significant to the traditional owners of the area, the Wurundjeri people of the Kulin nation.

== History ==
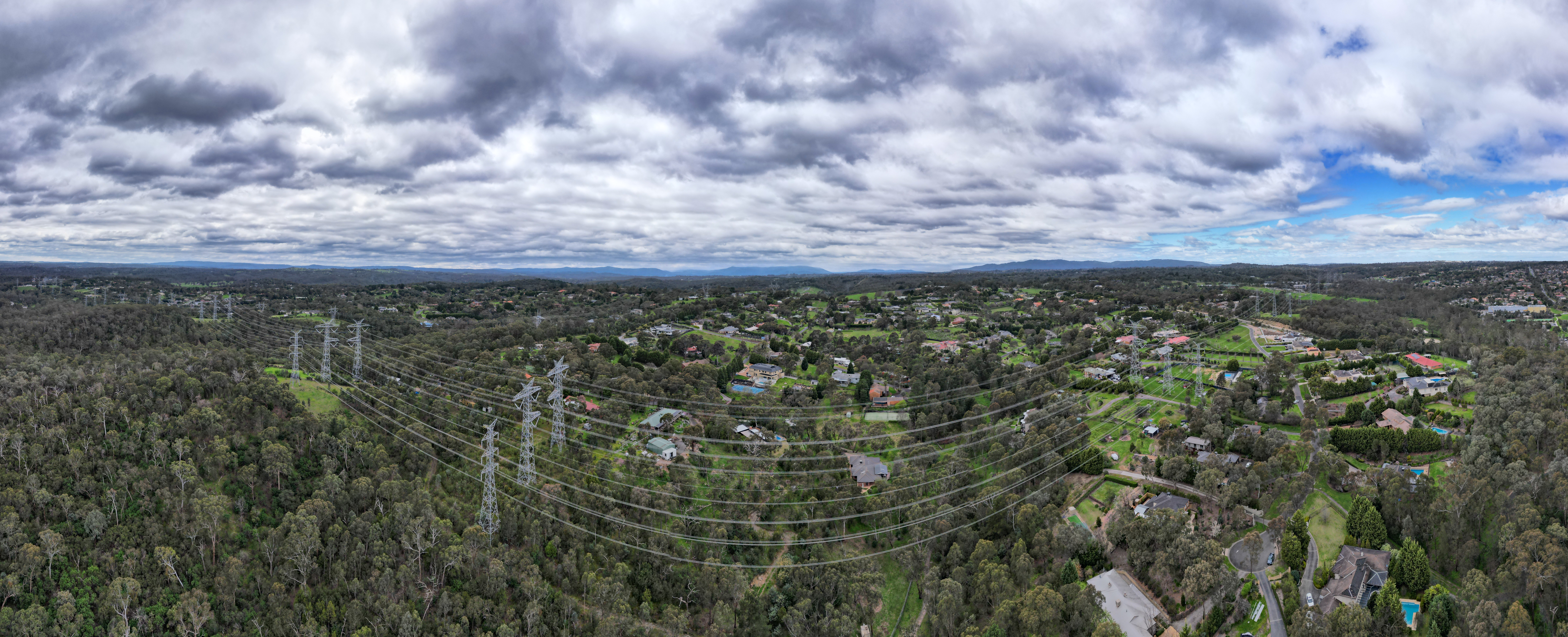
Aerial panorama of Currawong Bush Park facing east to the Dandenong Ranges

An archaeological survey of Aboriginal sites within the City of Manningham by Isabel Ellender in 1991 discovered evidence, in the form of four scarred trees, of the presence of the Wurundjeri people in the park. An Aboriginal stone artefact was also found along Mullum Mullum Creek. The Wurundjeri were part of the Kulin nation, comprising the main tribes living within about a 150 km radius of Melbourne. The Wurundjeri are of the Woiwurrung tribe, one of five Kulin tribes, each of whom had their land and language.

More recent history shows the building housing the Ranger's Residence, Park Office and Conference Room as a building of state historical significance. It is a notable example of the design work of Victorian architect Geoffrey Trewenack. It has sometimes mistakenly been attributed to the Victorian architect Kevin Borland. The house was built by Robin and Bunty Elder, in 1959. They resided there until approximately 1969 when the property was acquired as a public park.

Currently, the park has no on-site manager or ranger. Previously, a full-time ranger was employed by the City of Manningham through an environmental group until funding was cut around 2004. According to the Currawong Bush Park management plan in 2003, $1–2 million would be enough to upgrade facilities and deal with threats to the park's ecology. Three staff are required to operate and manage the park properly.

== Geography ==
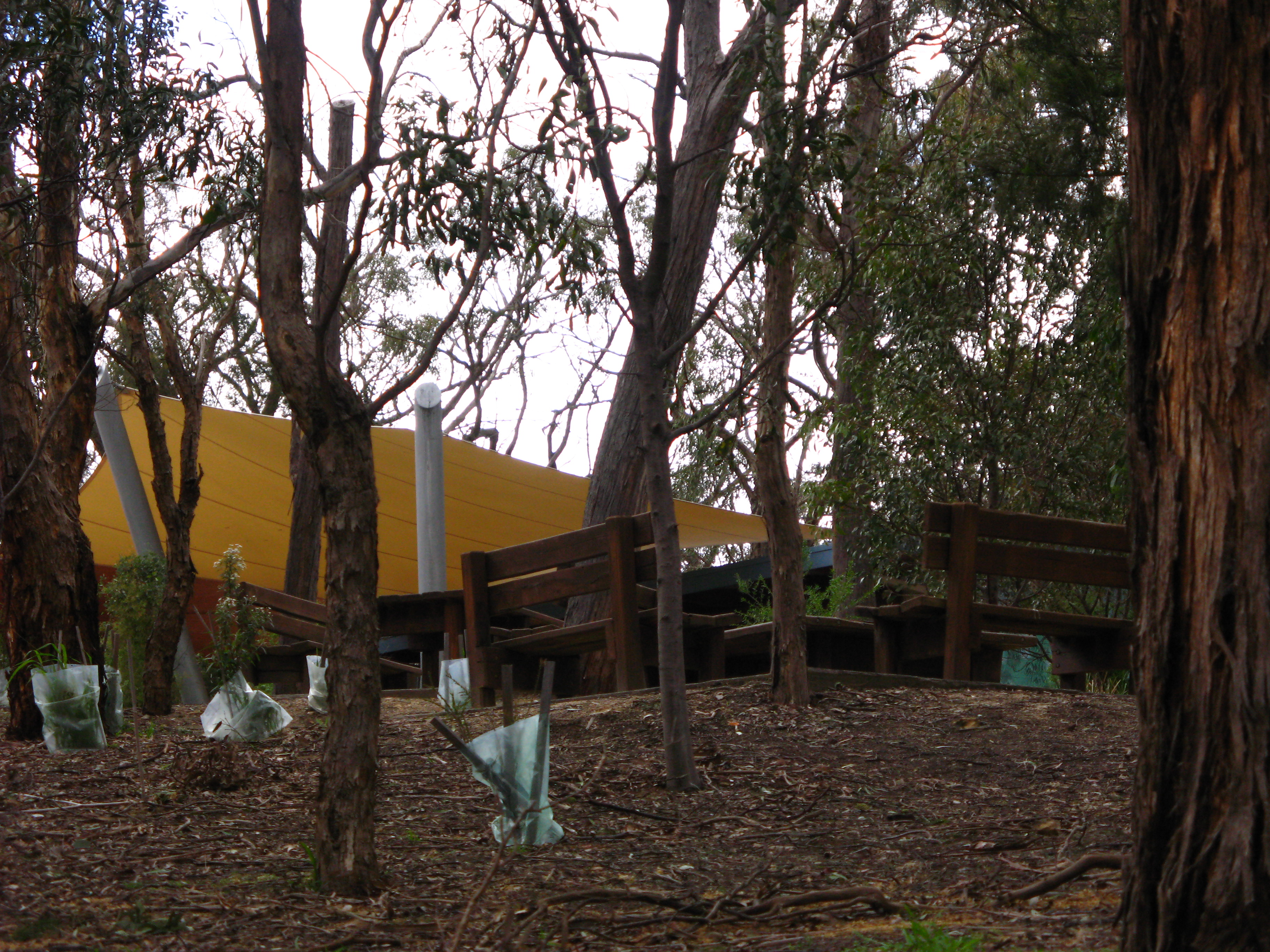
Regenerative planting near the education centre and camping site

The park is 59 hectares of bushland in the Yarra Valley on the eastern bank of the Mullum Mullum Creek, from the creek itself along the flat banks and up the hillside. The hillside is faulted by two gullies that flow into the Mullum Mullum Creek: Go-betweens Gully and Amersham Gully. The Mullum Mullum Creek Linear Park sits on the opposite bank of Mullum Mullum Creek to the west.

=== Watercourses ===
- Mullum Mullum Creek
- Go-Betweens Gully
- Amersham Gully

=== Waterbodies ===
- Millers Pond – a purpose-built reservoir added around the same time as the stockyards
- Billy Baxter Wetlands – recently constructed regenerative wetlands
- Penny's Pond

== Ecology ==
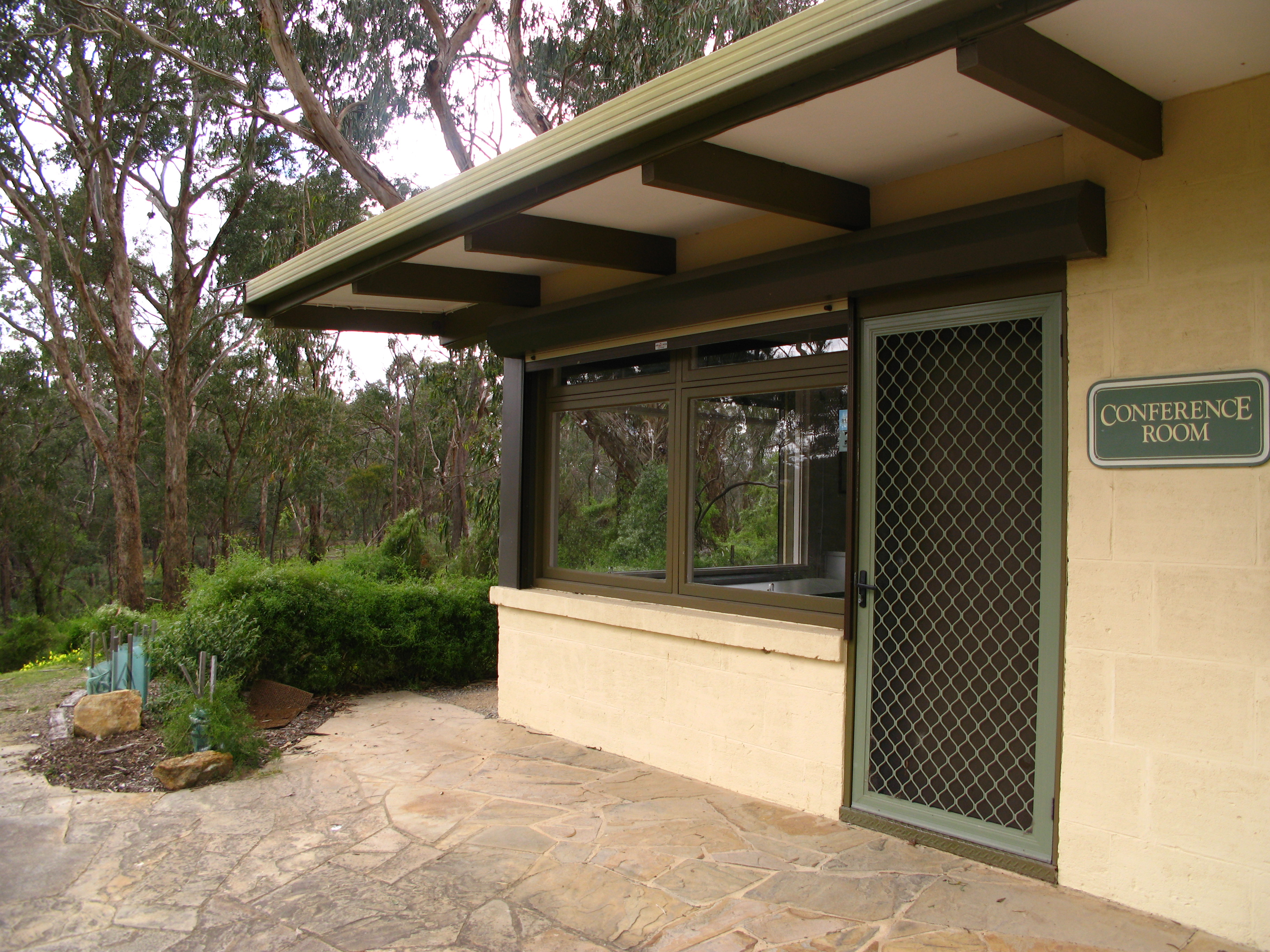
The heritage listed Conference Centre building

Native species of flora and fauna can be found within the park, including many species of eucalypts such as the manna gum and kangaroos such as the eastern grey.

=== Threats to ecology ===
Being surrounded by low-density residential development, some of the most urgent problems the park faces are from the introduced species such as rabbits, foxes, stray dogs, and cats, occupying the park. Stray dogs mutilate eastern grey kangaroos and any young they may be carrying, and rabbits dig furrows in the soil and entice foxes into the park who compete with stray dogs for territory. Stray cats hunt native bird life and possums. Various weeds from neighbouring properties flow down watercourses into the gullies.

Threats from humans include disturbance of plant and animal life from motorbikes and bicycles, and light pollution from the neighbouring hockey field in the southern area of the park. The combined effect of the light pollution, traffic noise and pollution from Reynolds Road drives wildlife away from the southern slopes and into other areas of the park where they compete with other species for already limited resources.

== Visitor attractions ==
There are formed walking trails and places of interest to draw visitors to the park. Currawong Bush Park Walks are a series of eight walks, each focusing on different aspects of the reserve. All of these walks start and finish within the park. Downloadable audio guides are available.

== Regulations ==
The entire park is off-limits to dogs. Motorized transport including motorbikes, scooters, and trail bikes are strictly limited to the roadway and carparks. Cyclists may ride on fire access tracks, but must dismount before entering smaller, unsealed walking tracks. The park is particularly susceptible to bushfires and, being so close to residential areas, the fire danger in the area is immediate. Fire is only allowed in the campfire site near the education centre, where there are electric barbecues for cooking. There is no camping allowed in the park.
