= Mullum Mullum Creek Linear Park =

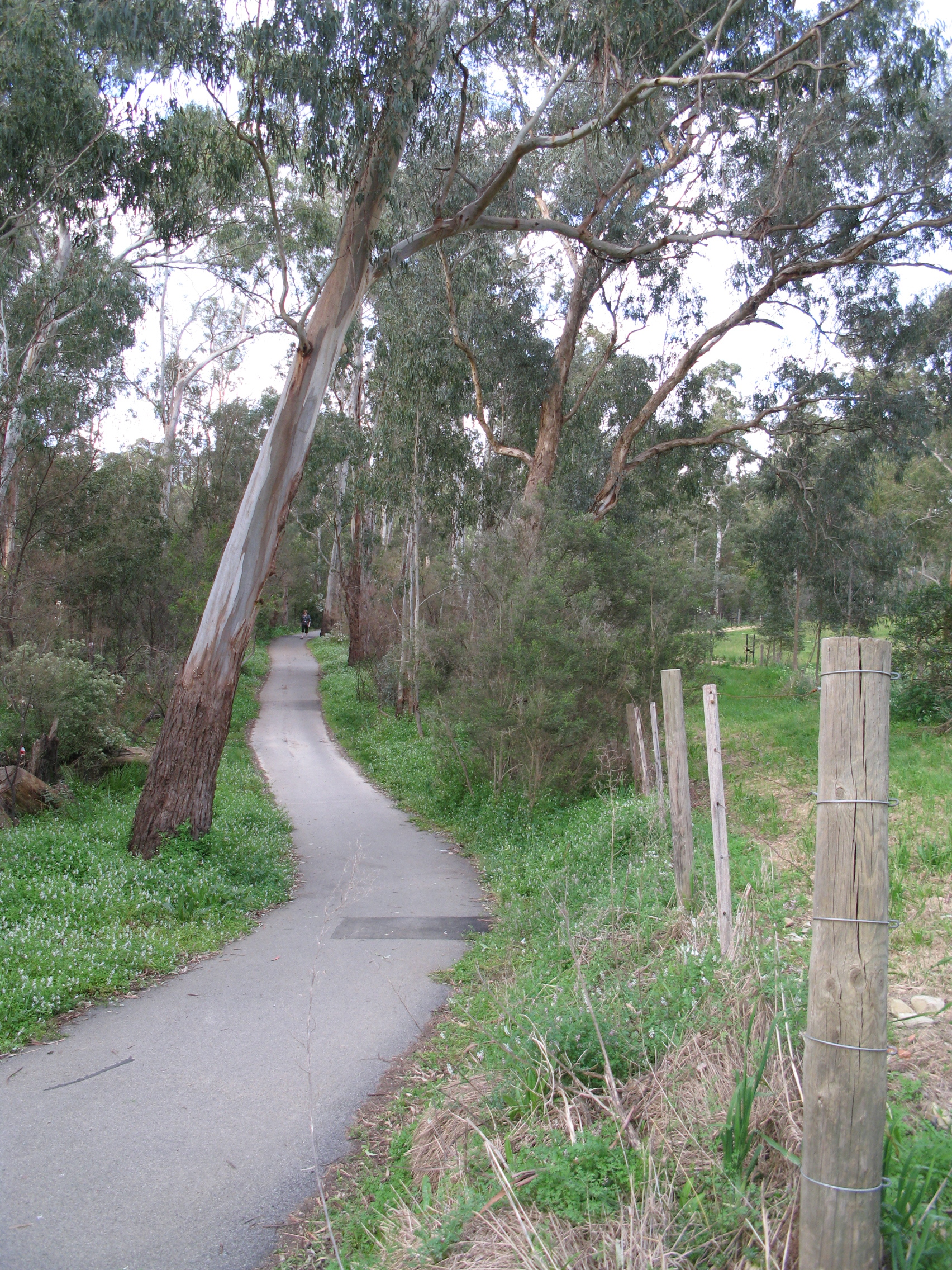
- Mullum Mullum Creek Trail through the Linear Park
- Interactive map of Mullum Mullum Creek Linear Park
- Location: Melbourne, Australia
- Coordinates: 37°46′14″S 145°11′14″E
- Opened: 1977
- Operator: City of Manningham
- Paths: Sealed
- Terrain: Creek banks, floodplains and wetlands
- Water: Mullum Mullum Creek
- Facilities: Seats

The Mullum Mullum Creek Linear Park is located east of Melbourne, Australia in the suburbs of Doncaster East and Donvale. It stretches for roughly 9 km along the western banks of the Mullum Mullum Creek between Heidelberg-Warrandyte Road and The Eastlink Trail. Facilities include sealed pathways, barbecues and shelters. Other features include, bush walking tracks, trails and equestrian trails.

Throughout much of the 1990s, extensive regenerative planting was conducted throughout the entire length of the park; this has restored much of the native riparian bushland within the park, most prominently the Mullum Mullum Wetlands.

== Recreation ==
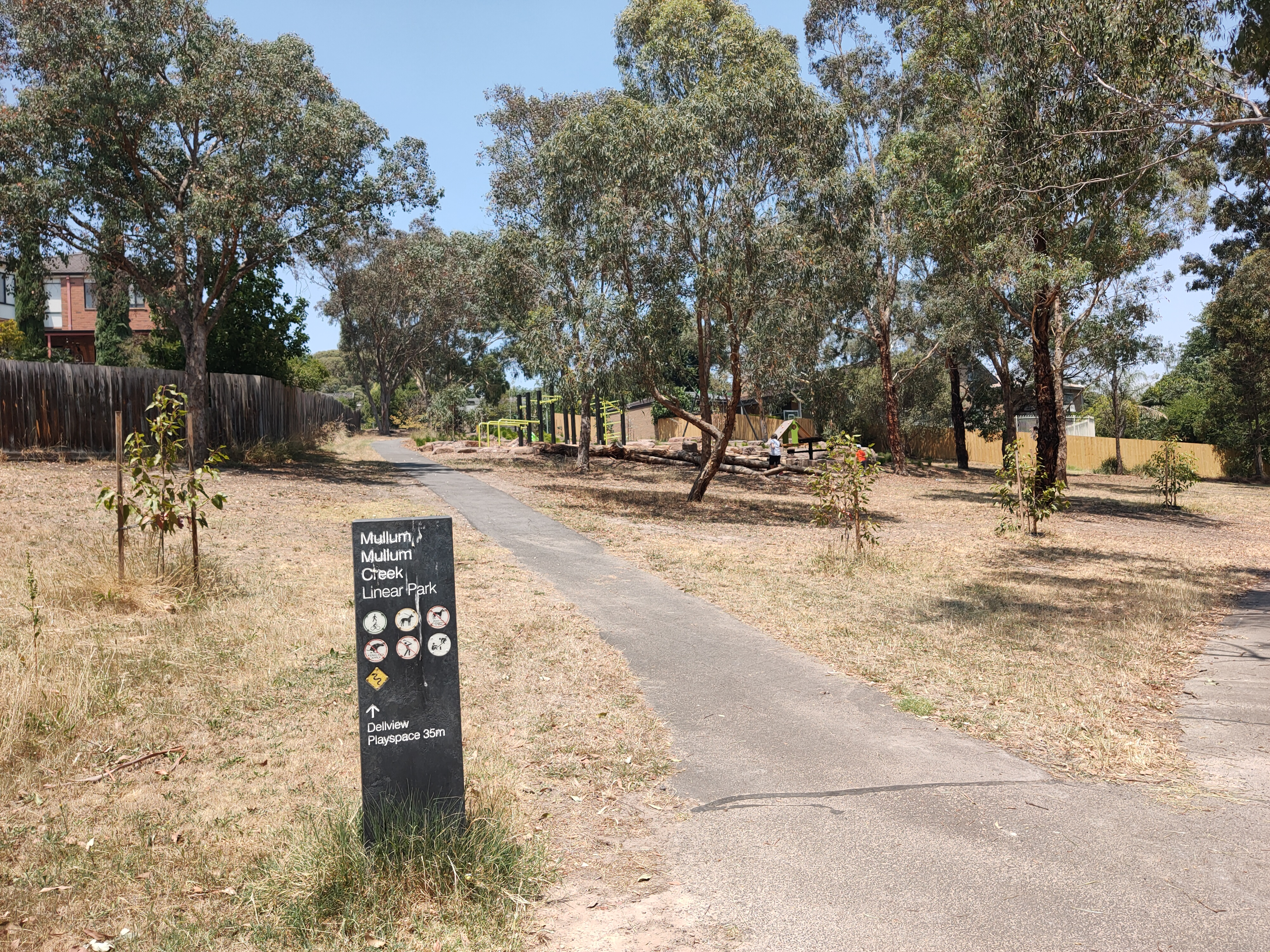
Dellview Playspace at Mullum Mullum Linear Park 1

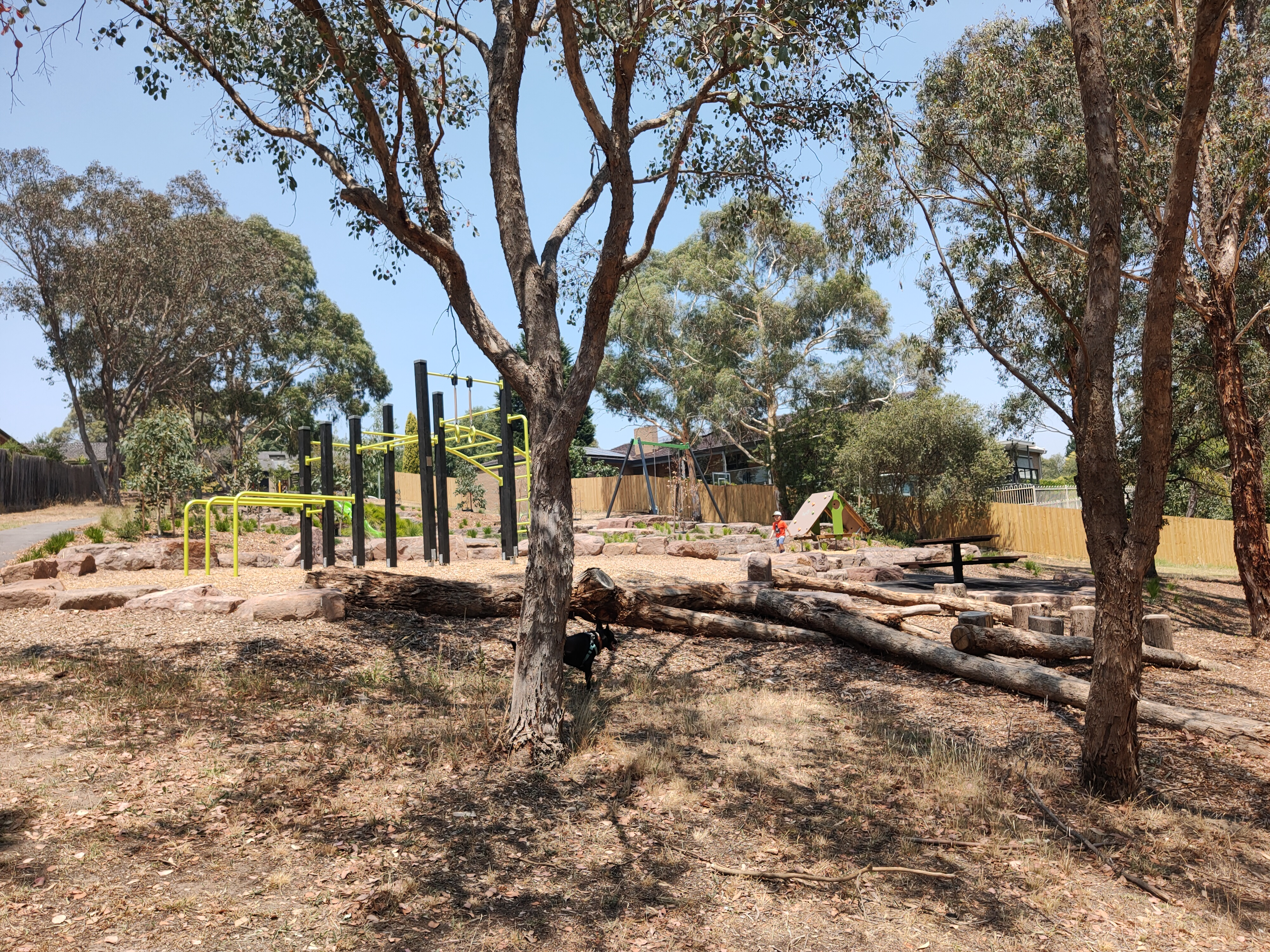
Dellview Playspace at Mullum Mullum Linear Park

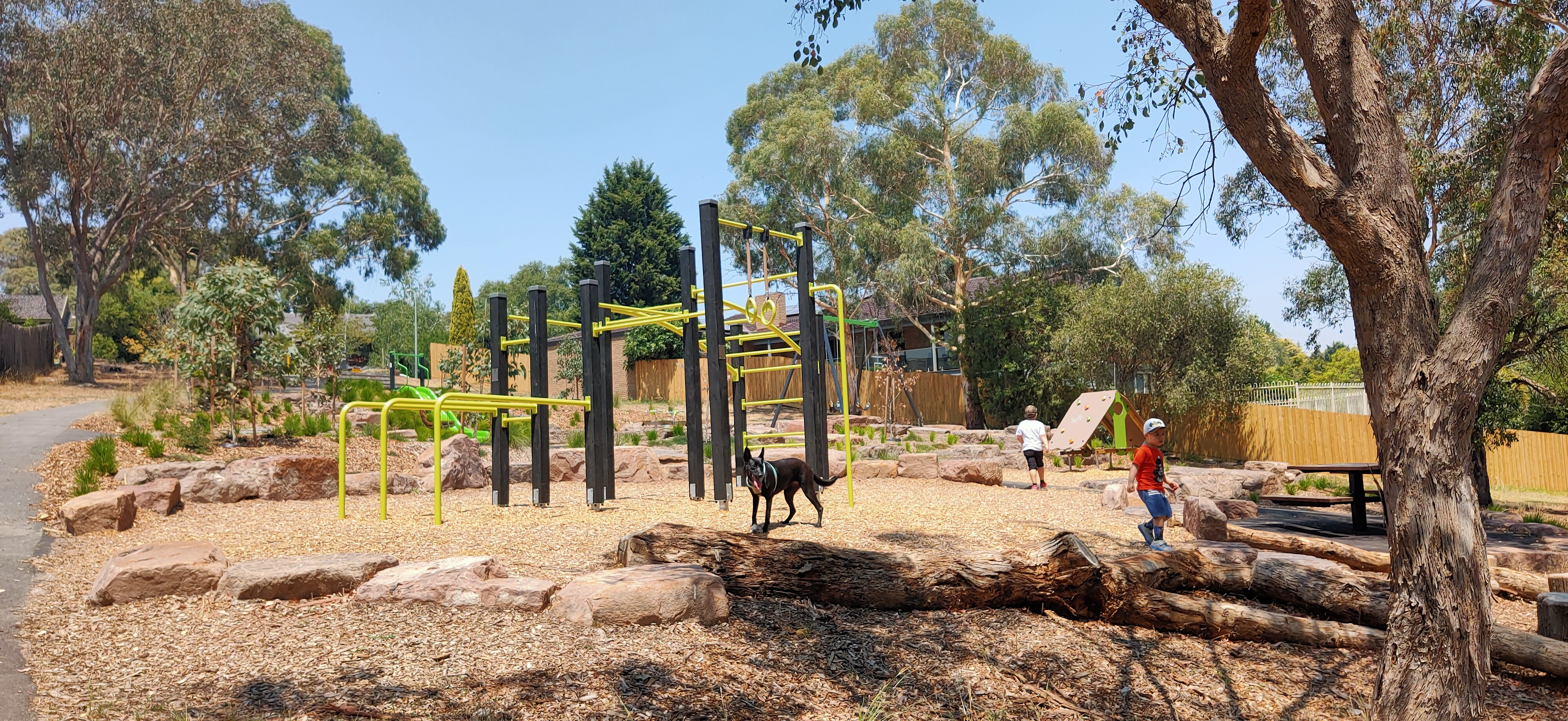
Dellview Playspace at Mullum Mullum Linear Park

Cycling is popular in the park, which hosts part of the northern section of the Mullum Mullum Creek Trail. The park sprawls out into residential housing and is linked to some surrounding roads directly or via other parks, where the park crosses major roads; these are indicated in bold:

- **Heidelberg-Warrandyte Road**
- Deep Creek Drive
- Larnoo Drive
- **Reynolds Road**
- Parklands Close
- Jolen Court
- Baradine Terrace
- Springvale Road
- **Tindals Road**

== Surrounding Parklands ==
The park adjoins other parks surrounding the Mullum Mullum Creek:

- Buck Reserve (equestrian facilities)
- Mullum Mullum Reserve (hockey, bowls, tennis)
- Currawong Bush Park
- Deep Creek Reserve (baseball)

== Access ==
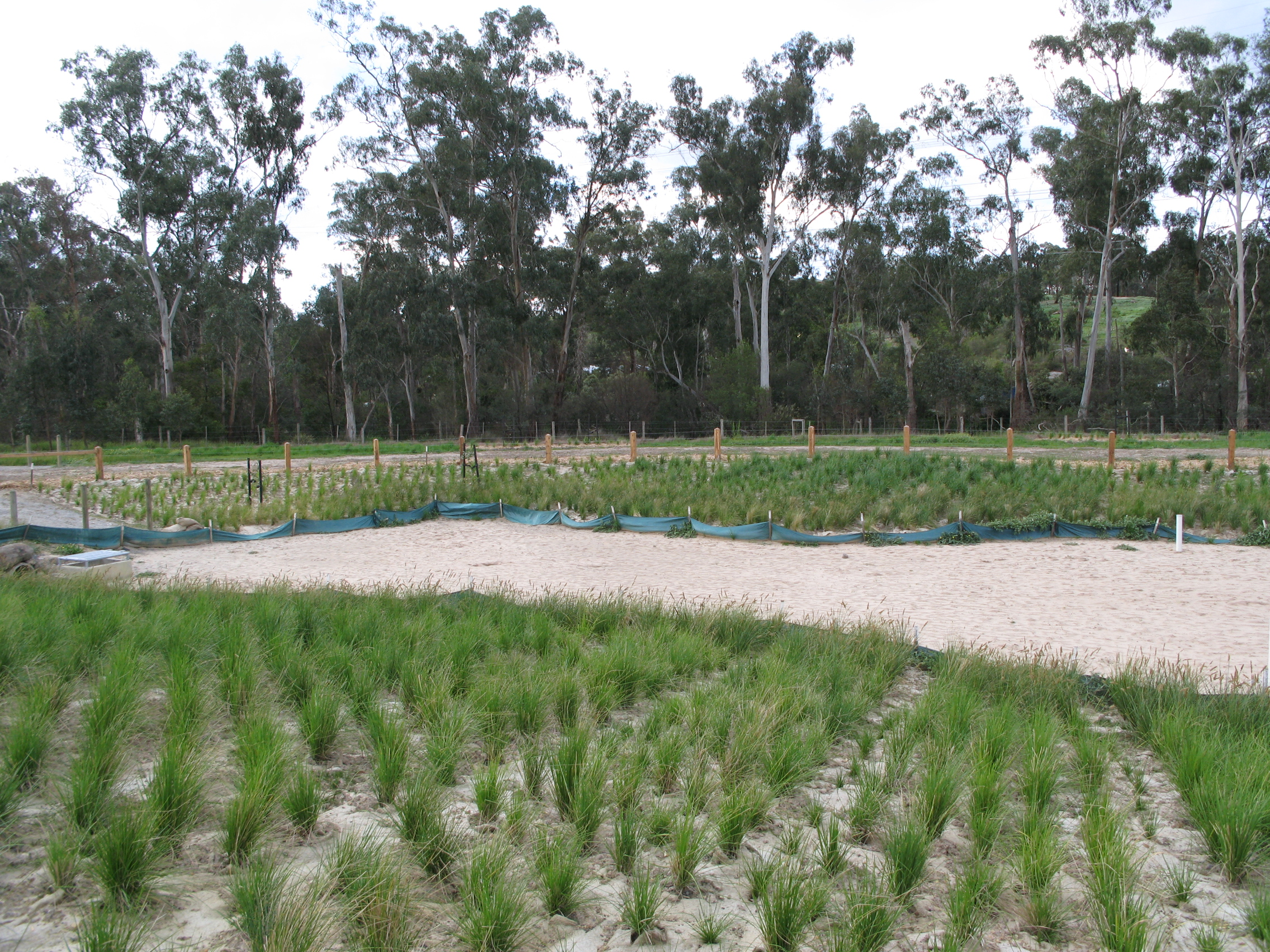
Wetland regeneration constructed in 2008, beside the Linear Park.

Busses run along Heidelberg-Warrandyte Road (numbers 154, 155, 156, 159, 304, 364) and Reynolds Road (number 154).

There are carparks at Heidelberg-Warrandyte Road, Reynolds Road and Tindals Road each either a capacity of 10-20 cars. The Mullum Mullum Creek Trail provides cycling and pedestrian access.
