= St Clems Trail =

Path in Melbourne, Australia

- Length: 0.9 km
- Location: Melbourne, Australia
- Difficulty: Easy
- Hazards: Crossing St Clems Road
- Surface: Bitumen and concrete
- Hills: One continuous hill northbound
- Water: Drinking fountain at Baratta Street
- Bus: 280 282
- Parking: On-street

The St Clems Trail is a shared use path for cyclists and pedestrians in the outer eastern suburb of Doncaster East in Melbourne, Victoria, Australia.
