= Milgate Park Estate =

Housing estate in Melbourne, Australia

Coordinates: 37°46′30″S 145°10′15″E

The Milgate Park Estate is a housing estate in Doncaster East, a suburb of Melbourne, Australia. The estate comprises 40 hectares of land situated around a section of Long Valley, a gully bed that no longer carries surface water, which flows northeast and into the Mullum Mullum Creek. The land was used for orchards from the 1860s to the 1970s when it was subdivided for residential housing. Land in the estate itself was released to the public in two stages, the southern area first, followed by the northern area.

The estate is listed on the Register of the National Estate for historical importance, it is a rare example of the implementation of the planning principles of the Radburn principle traffic separation idea (known as the planning scheme for "towns of the motor age") which served as a precedent for the car-free movement. It included communal ownership of community facilities and extensive community parkland. Facilities include; a playground, two tennis courts, a netball court, football ground and playing facilities. The facilities are owned by the residents through a Home Owners Association. There is no through traffic and only Landscape Drive is not a court.

== Parklands ==
Milgate Park extends through much of the estate, Landscape Drive Reserve (formally a lake) adjoins the estate at the northern section of Landscape Drive.

== Roadways ==
Many of the roadways within the estate were named after artists of the Heidelberg Arts School:

- Landscape Drive

Reddington Terrace
Lambert Place
Dowling Grove
Watling Terrace
Buvelot Wynd
Meldrum Close
Heysen Grove
McCubbin Terrace
Streeton Lane
Dobell Place

- Andersons Creek Road

Ramsay Close
Longstaff Court
Roper Place
Wiarando Court
