= Doug Hilton =

Australian molecular biologist

Doug Hilton AO FAA FTSE FAHMS
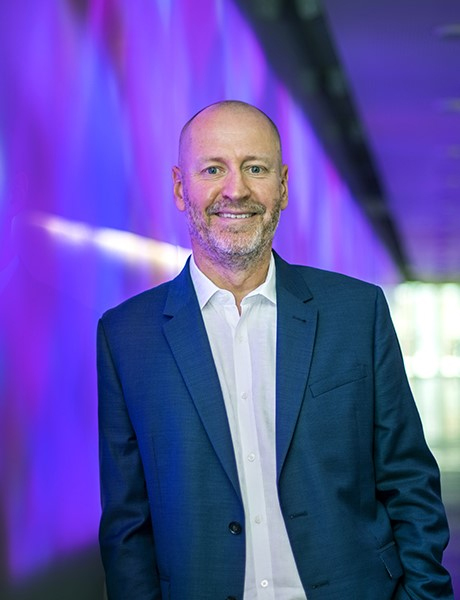
- Hilton in 2019

Chief Executive of the CSIRO
- Incumbent
- Assumed office 1 July 2023
- Preceded by: Larry Marshall

Personal details
- Born: Douglas James Hilton; 13 June 1964 (age 62) Eton, Berkshire, England
- Education: East Doncaster High School
- Alma mater: Monash University
- Occupation: Molecular biology and hematopoiesis at the Walter and Eliza Hall Institute of Medical Research

Douglas James Hilton (born 13 June 1964 in England) is an Australian molecular biologist. He is the CEO of CSIRO and immediate past Director of the Walter and Eliza Hall Institute of Medical Research in Melbourne, Australia. His research has focused on cytokines, signal transduction pathways and the regulation of blood cell formation (hematopoiesis). Hilton was the President of the Association of the Australian Medical Research Institutes (AAMRI) from 2014-16.

== Early life ==
Hilton migrated to Australia with his family in 1970 and grew up in the Melbourne suburb of Warrandyte. He was educated at Warrandyte Primary School and East Doncaster High School, where he recalls being inspired by “a wonderful biology teacher”.

== Scientific career ==
=== Education ===
Hilton received a Bachelor of Science from Monash University. He spent summer holidays as an undergraduate researcher in the laboratory of Ian Young at the John Curtin School of Medical Research. His Honours and PhD research projects were conducted with Professors Don Metcalf and Nicos Nicola at the Walter and Eliza Hall Institute, and resulted in the cloning of the cytokine Leukemia Inhibitory Factor (LIF).

=== Cytokine Signalling and Blood Cell Formation ===
Hilton spent two years as a postdoctoral fellow studying the erythropoietin (EPO) receptor with Professor Harvey Lodish at the Whitehead Institute, MIT, USA. In 1993 Hilton returned to the Walter and Eliza Hall Institute where he continued his research into cytokine signalling, with discoveries including the interleukin-11 receptor, the interleukin-13 receptor, and the Suppressors of Cytokine Signalling (SOCS) proteins. In recent years, together with Professor Warren Alexander and Dr Benjamin Kile, Hilton has established a new program using large-scale mouse genetics and genomics to identify regulators of blood cell formation, with a view to determining targets for the development of new medicines. He has been the head of the Institute's Division of Molecular Medicine since it began in 2006, and is a professor in the University of Melbourne Faculty of Medicine, Dentistry and Health Science.

=== Other positions ===
From 1997 to 2001, Hilton served as Director of the Cooperative Research Centre (CRC) for Cellular Growth Factors, during which he initiated the Australian Undergraduate Research Opportunity Program (UROP). He is also a co-founder and Chief Scientific Officer of the biotechnology company MuriGen Therapeutics. He currently serves on the Board of the Victorian Comprehensive Cancer Centre, the Australian Cancer Research Foundation Medical Research Advisory Committee, the Victorian Cancer Agency Plan Implementation Committee, the Victorian Life Sciences Computational Initiative Steering Committee, the Board of the Bio21 Cluster, and the Board of the National Center for Genetic Engineering and Biotechnology, Thailand.

=== Directorship of the Walter and Eliza Hall Institute ===
On 1 July 2009, Hilton became the sixth Director of the Walter and Eliza Hall Institute.

At the time of appointment, Hilton believed that the Institute's success requires:

- continuing its cornerstone research into cancer, blood cells, immunology, autoimmunity and infectious diseases, and enhancing this research with technological and investigative innovations including structural biology, chemistry, high-throughput screening, and mathematics and computational science.
- expanding the translational research conducted by the Institute and considering, in collaboration with indigenous communities and other organisations, ways in which the research strengths of the Institute can be constructively utilised to improve indigenous health in Australia.
- enhancing the institute's links with the University of Melbourne, the Royal Melbourne Hospital and other leading centres of excellence in medical research and education, and continuing to pursue collaborations with the private sector.

=== Chief Executive of the Commonwealth Scientific and Industrial Research Organisation (CSIRO) ===
On 19 June 2023, it was announced that Doug Hilton was to become the Chief Executive of CSIRO starting 29 September 2023.

== Awards and honours ==
- 1989 — Victorian Young Achiever of the Year
- 1993 — Queen Elizabeth II Postdoctoral Fellowship
- 1998 — Gottschalk Medal, Australian Academy of Science
- 1999 — Australian Institute of Political Science, Victorian "Tall Poppy" Award
- 2000 — Amgen Medical Researcher Award, Australian Society for Medical Research
- 2000 — Inaugural Commonwealth Health Minister's Award for Excellence in Health and Medical Research
- 2003 — The GlaxoSmithKline Australia Award for Research Excellence
- 2004 — Fellow of the Australian Academy of Science (FAA)
- 2006 — COSMOS Bright Spark Award "Australia's Top 10 Scientific Minds Under 45"
- 2008 — Australia National Health and Medical Research Council “Ten great minds in health and medical research”
- 2009 — The Age Melbourne Magazine, “Top 100 People”
- 2010 — Fellow of the Australian Academy of Technological Sciences and Engineering (FTSE)
- 2011 — Seymour & Vivian Milstein Award for Excellence in Interferon and Cytokine Research, International Cytokine Society and the International Society for Interferon and Cytokine Research
- 2011 — Research Australia Leadership and Innovation Award
- 2012 — Lemberg Medal, Australian Society of Biochemistry and Molecular Biology
- 2012 — Eureka Prize for Outstanding Mentor of Young Researchers
- 2013 — Ramaciotti Medal for Excellence in Biomedical Research
- 2015 — Fellow of the Australian Academy of Health and Medical Sciences
- 2016 — Officer in the Order of Australia (AO) for distinguished service to medical research and education, particularly in the field of haematology, as a molecular biologist and author, to gender equity, and as a mentor of young scientists.
- 2017 – Monash Distinguished Alumni Award, Faculty of Biomedical and Physiological Sciences
- 2020 – Melburnian of the Year
