= Petty's Orchard =

Commercial orchard in Melbourne, Australia

Petty's Orchard in Templestowe, Victoria, Australia, is among Melbourne’s oldest and last-remaining commercial orchards. A section of the orchard holds one of the largest collection of heritage apple varieties in Australia, including more than 250 varieties of old or rare apples and other types of fruit.

In 1853 Thomas Petty arrived in Australia from England and selected land in the Doncaster and Templestowe area. His grandson Thomas Henry Petty first purchased the property now known as Petty's Orchard, located between Homestead Road and the Yarra River, in 1911. Thomas Henry was the first of three generations of Pettys to manage the orchard until Melbourne and Metropolitan Board of Works purchased the property in 1981. Under successive Victorian governments, the site has since been owned and administered by Melbourne Water (from 1992), Melbourne Parks and Waterways and Parks Victoria (1996 to present).

The Petty's Orchard property occupies 44 hectares of land. It is leased to Yarra Organics, who operate it as a family business. Twenty-five hectares of the property is run as an organically-certified commercial orchard providing a range of fresh fruits to the market, and also incorporates an organic food shop and a popular cafe. The Petty's Orchard property additionally encompasses a four-hectare heritage fruits collection (previously referred to as the 'Demonstration Orchard'), a wetlands area including a bird hide, and remnants of a former fruit and nut arboretum.

The Heritage Fruits Society manages and maintains the heritage fruits collection at Petty's Orchard. The volunteer-run Society is one of many worldwide which conserve rarely-seen fruit varieties for use, study and appreciation by future generations. Long-term conservation of fruit varieties involves replicating them by grafting budwood onto rootstock. To this end, the Society annually runs public events which include the sale of budwood, basic training in tree grafting, and fruit-tasting events where rare fruit varieties can be seen and sampled.

== See also ==
- Mullum Mullum Creek
