= Roy Donovan =

Australian rules footballer

Personal information
- Full name: Henry Roy Donovan
- Born: 26 November 1903; Seymour, Victoria
- Died: 18 February 1972 (aged 68); Donvale, Victoria
- Height: 182 cm (6 ft 0 in)
- Weight: 77 kg (170 lb)

Playing career^{1}
Years	Club	Games (Goals)
1925–1926	Hawthorn	9 (1)
- ^{1} Playing statistics correct to the end of 1926.

Henry Roy Donovan (26 November 1903 – 18 February 1972) was an Australian rules footballer who played with Hawthorn in the Victorian Football League (VFL).

== Family ==
The son of Jeremiah Joseph Donovan (1864–1951) and Mary Ellen Donovan (1871–1939), nee McCormack, Henry Roy Donovan was born at Seymour on 26 November 1903.

== Football ==
Originally playing with Richmond reserves, Donovan transferred to Hawthorn during the 1925 VFL season and made 9 senior appearances in two seasons at the club before breaking his ankle in a reserves match. Donovan was not retained on Hawthorn's list for the 1927 season.

== Later life ==
Roy Donovan married Ellen Mary O'Connor in 1936 and they lived in Ultima, Victoria before returning to live in the eastern suburbs of Melbourne.

Donovan died on 18 February 1972 and is buried at Templestowe Cemetery.
