= Ted Aumann =

Australian rules footballer

Personal information
- Full name: Edward Adolph Aumann
- Born: 29 December 1897; Doncaster, Victoria
- Died: 13 August 1982 (aged 84); Donvale, Victoria
- Original team: Doncaster
- Height: 183 cm (6 ft 0 in)
- Weight: 76 kg (168 lb)

Playing career^{1}
Years	Club	Games (Goals)
1919	Richmond	7 (0)
- ^{1} Playing statistics correct to the end of 1919.

Edward Adolph Aumann (29 December 1897 – 13 August 1982) was an Australian rules footballer who played with Richmond in the Victorian Football League (VFL). He later served on the Eastern Districts League Tribunal and also served as President of the Nunawading Football Club.
