= Bernie Shannon =

Australian rules footballer

Personal information
- Full name: Bernard Leslie Shannon
- Born: 12 February 1929; Preston
- Died: 19 February 2014 (aged 85); Donvale, Victoria
- Original team: Preston Wanderers / St Thomas's College
- Height: 192 cm (6 ft 4 in)
- Weight: 76 kg (168 lb)
- Position: Centre Half Forward

Playing career^{1}
Years	Club	Games (Goals)
1949–1951	Collingwood	37 (44)
1954–1955	Port Melbourne (VFA)	
- ^{1} Playing statistics correct to the end of 1955.

Career highlights
- Played on John Coleman

Bernard Leslie Shannon (12 February 1929 – 19 February 2014) was an Australian rules footballer who played for the Collingwood Football Club in the Victorian Football League (VFL).
