= Mullum Mullum Creek =

Creek in Victoria, Australia

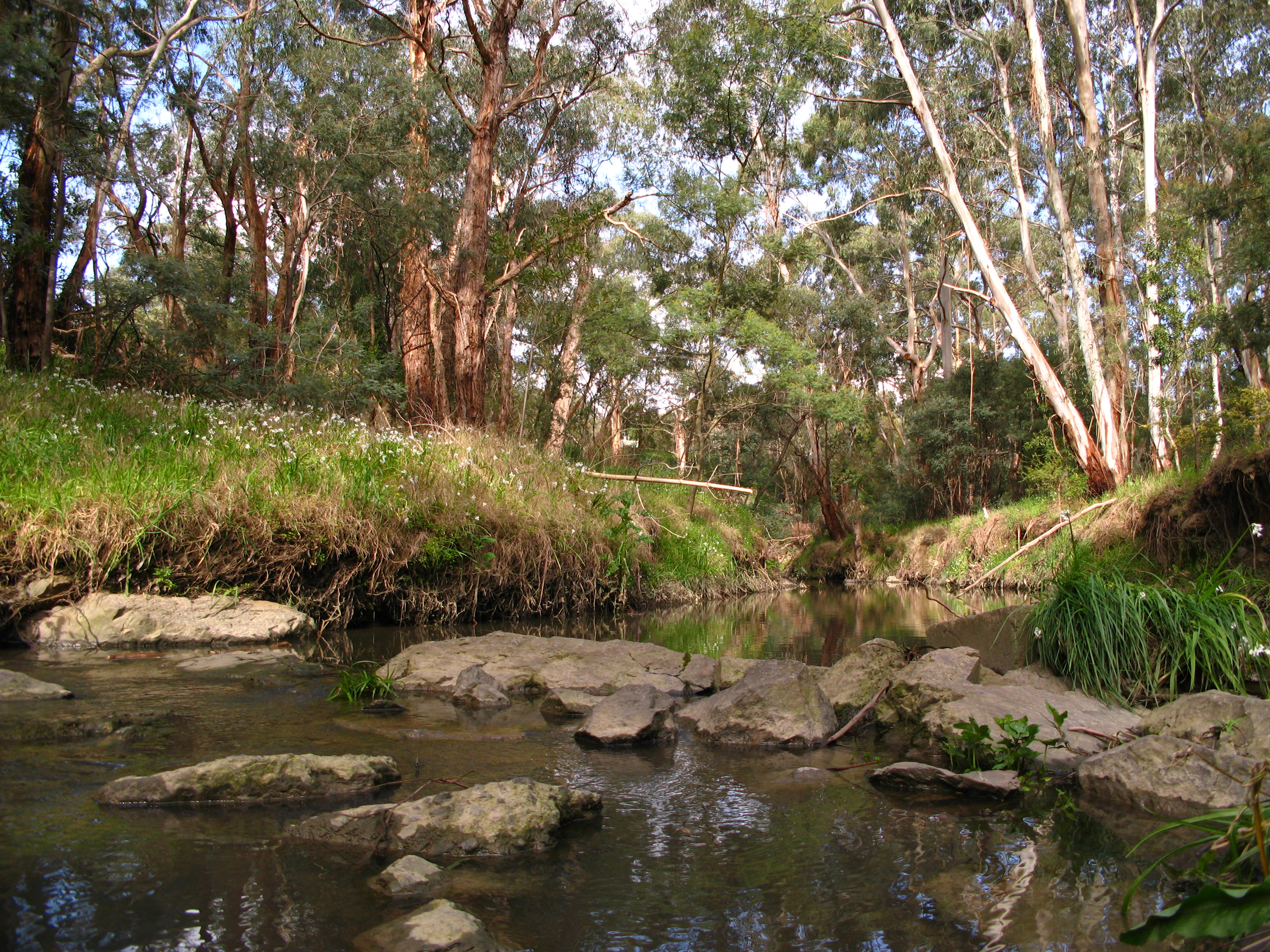
- The Mullum Mullum Creek at Mitcham

- Location of the Mullum Mullum Creek mouth in Victoria

Location
- Country: Australia
- State: Victoria
- LGA: City of Maroondah; City of Manningham
- City: Melbourne

Physical characteristics
- Mouth: confluence with the Yarra River
  - location: Templestowe
  - coordinates: 37°44′17″S 145°9′45″E
  - elevation: 27 m (89 ft)
- Length: 22 km (14 mi)
- Discharge
  - location: mouth

Basin features
- River system: Port Phillip catchment

Mullum Mullum Creek is a creek in the outer eastern suburbs of Melbourne, Victoria, Australia. It is the main watercourse of the Mullum Mullum Valley, a tributary of the Yarra River and Yarra Valley. For tens of thousands of years it was used as a food and tool source sustainably by the Wurundjeri people, Indigenous Australians of the Kulin nation, who spoke variations of the Woiwurrung language group.

It is one of the only watercourses lying within urban metropolitan Melbourne that is surrounded by native and regenerated bushland for almost its entire length, and is a significant remnant ecosystem in Melbourne. Around 80,000 people live in the creek's catchment area. The remnant bushland across its length provides habitat for significant species such as platypus, rakali, koalas, powerful owl, nankeen night heron, white-winged chough and yellow-tailed black cockatoo.

In recent decades the creek and valley have been central in many of the issues in Melbourne's eastern suburbs, such as; residential housing estates, regeneration of native vegetation and most recently, Tollway construction. The Eastlink Tollway passes underneath the valley through 1.5-km of tunnels to avoid disturbing the remnant ecosystem through the Mullum Mullum Gorge, however through Ringwood, it crosses the creek above ground, resulting in the relocation of the creek through this area.

== Etymology ==
Mullum Mullum is adapted from Woiwurrung language and is thought to mean "place of many big birds" and led many historians to conclude that it meant "Place of Eagles". Many other interpretations have been suggested including; "place of many big swifts" or "place of many big owls" perhaps in reference to the powerful owls of the valley. Some historians suspect Mullum Mullum to be a mistranslation of another Wurundjeri expression Ballum Ballum meaning "place of many butterflies". Around the higher grassy woodlands there are large numbers of butterfly and moth species breeding in the grasslands, many of which have not yet been documented.

== Geography and ecology ==
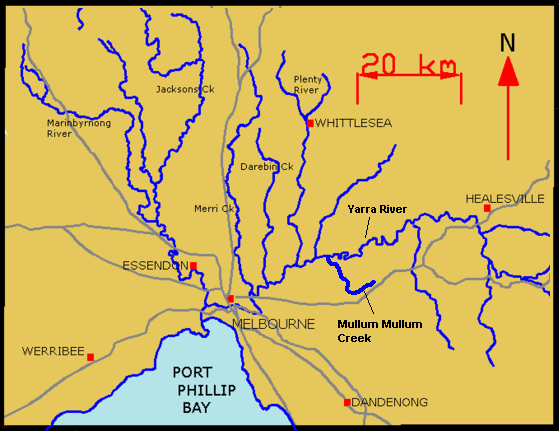
Location of the Mullum Mullum Creek in relation to the Yarra River and its tributaries

The creek flows for 22 kilometres (14 mi) through the Mullum Mullum Valley travelling west and then north where it flows into the Yarra River. It passes through many of Melbourne's eastern suburbs including; Croydon, Ringwood, Mitcham, Donvale, East Doncaster, western Warrandyte and Templestowe. It is most often a slight green/brown colour due to the riverbed silt, during heavy rainfall it appears light brown. Its geography is generally divided up into 4 sections; The High Plateau Tract, The Mullum Mullum Gorge, The Valley Tract and The Plains Tract.

=== High Plateau Tract ===
Through: Croydon, Ringwood

A ring of high forested hills that separates the Dandenong Valley from the Yarra Valley is the source of the Mullum Mullum Creek. The high plateau is formed by the Wicklow Ridge to Reagh's Hill in the east, Bedford Road and Maroondah Highway in the south, and the Loughnan's Hill, Wonga Road ridge to the west. Commencing in Croydon south of Birt's Hill behind the Yarra Valley School, the Mullum Mullum Creek flows south downstream passing remnant orchards, bushland and parks through Ringwood and past Eastland Shopping Centre. Native hyacinth orchids and small grass trees are present in these remnant forests.

The otter-like rakali feeds in the stream here. Grassy, sedgy woodlands here are home to many undocumented species of butterflies as well as birds and possums. Drier mixed species forests gradually give way to swamp gums and manna gums as the creek heads south. Near New Street, the creek once turned and flowed south of Maroondah Highway down the now dry bed of the upper Heatherdale Creek and into the Dandenong Creek and Port Philip Bay, but a natural 'river capture' has now taken the waters of the creek and diverted them through a narrow gap in the hills to the north and the Yarra River.

=== Mullum Mullum Gorge ===
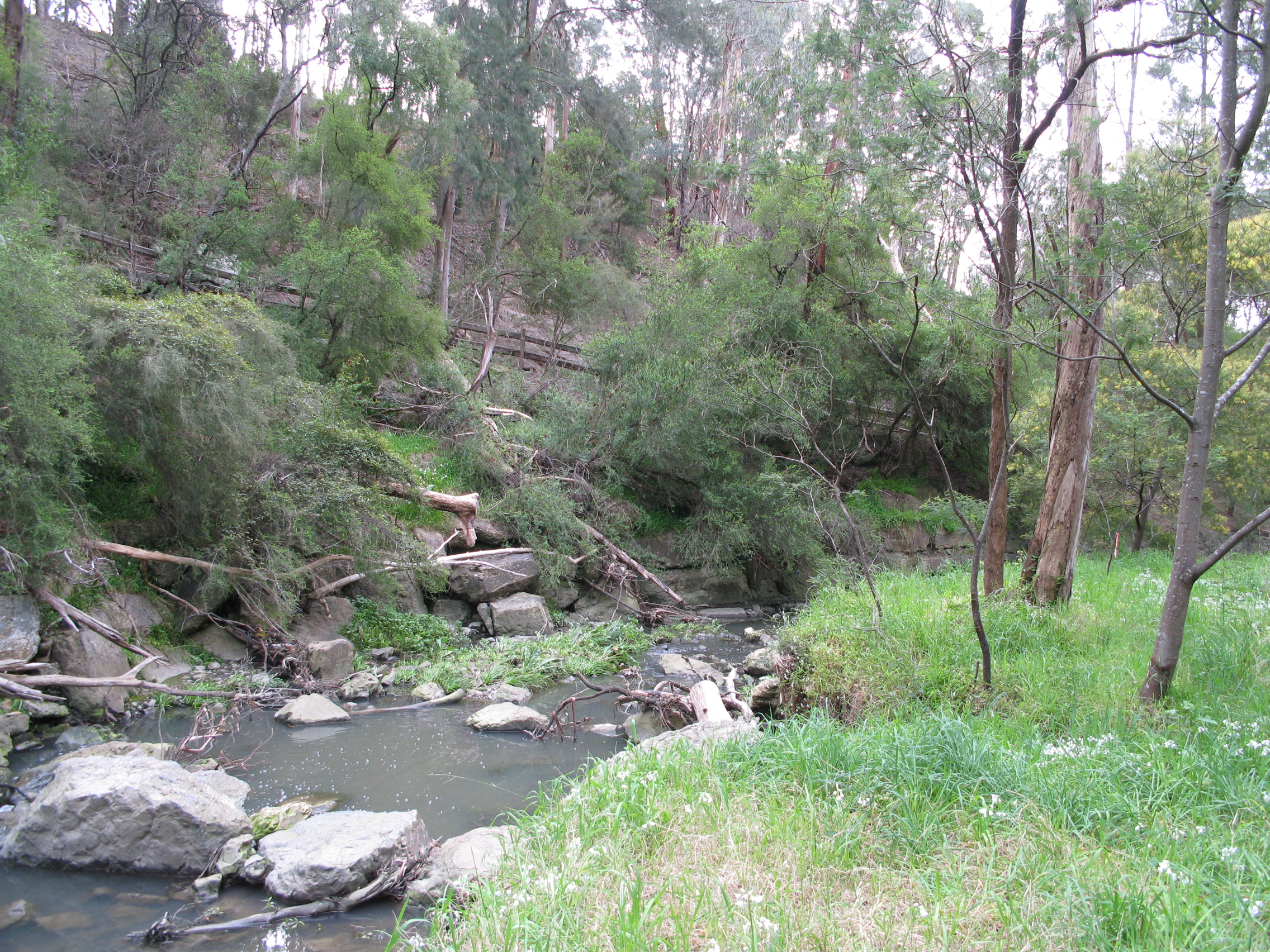
A section of the Mullum Mullum Gorge near Yarran Dheran

Through: Ringwood, Mitcham, Park Orchards, Donvale

With the extra captured water, the Mullum Mullum Creek has carved a steep V-shaped gorge with rocky cascades. Here in the damp shadows, tall old growth riparian forests provide habitat for koalas and native birds species. Maidenhair ferns and tree ferns thrive. The drier hillsides are home to native orchids and echidnas. Passing under the steep bushland escarpment below Poynton Avenue in Ringwood, the rocky cascades and fern covered banks of the Mullum Mullum gorge become apparent. Tall manna gum woodlands, some with treefern understorey, are home to tawny frogmouths and sugar gliders. Near Schwerkolt Cottage, the rocky cascades are bordered by drier open grassy woodlands, rare Valley Heathy Forest rich with native orchids, particularly near Antonio Park, Yarran Dheran, the Hillcrest area at Mitcham, and the Chaim Court bushland and pipe-track at Donvale.

The tall ancient manna gum forests near Whitefriars College are home to ducks (who nest on the tops of old stags) crimson rosellas, galahs and other parrots (who nest in old hollows), rare large powerful owls and rainbow lorikeets. Pied cormorants and night herons cruise the creek pools. Rakali and the occasional platypus, fish for galaxias, gudgeon and yabbies. There are signs of wombat diggings on the hill face but they are rarely seen. The occasional swamp wallaby and eastern grey kangaroo visit the gorge. In warm weather skinks, blue tongue lizards and copperhead snakes can be seen. Other rarely seen species include marbled geckos and white-lipped snakes.

=== Valley Tract ===
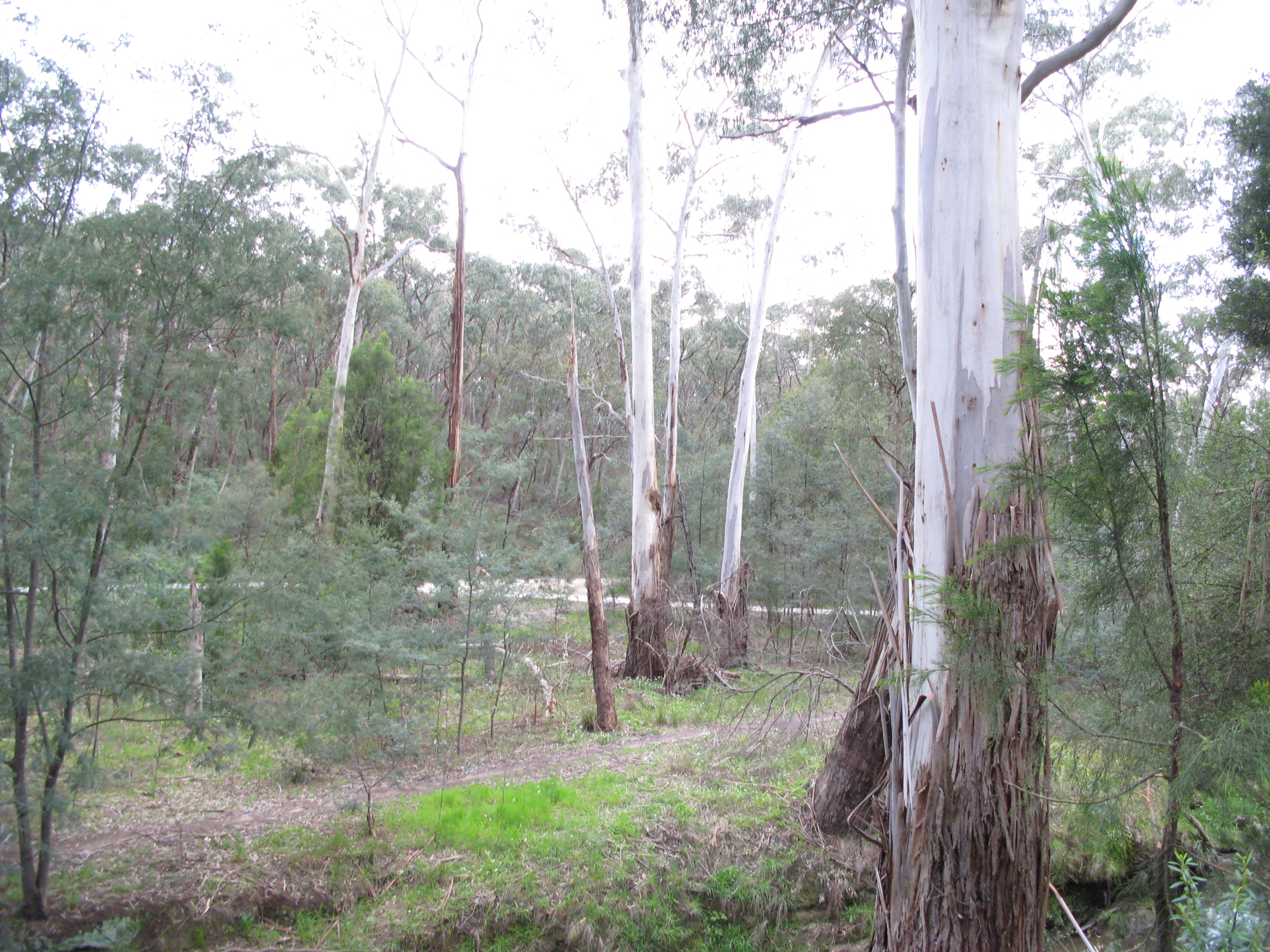
Vegetation around the creek through the valley tract

Through: Donvale, Doncaster East, Warrandyte

At Park Road in Park Orchards the valley begins to open up. Here many small tributaries join the Mullum Mullum Creek. Loughnan's Creek connects to Loughie's Bushland and B.J. Hubbard Bushland Reserves in Ringwood North, and many green corridors and urban pathways link to the Mullum Mullum Creek bushland parks on the west. Pockets of good bushland such as the girl guides camp in McGowans Road provide refuge to koalas and tawny frogmouths. Rare yellow box open woodlands with kangaroo grass understorey to the east help protect the resident kangaroos and the breeding white-winged choughs. The higher ground in Park Orchards provides views to the dividing ranges and Mount Macedon and glimpses of the Yarra Valley to the north. Old gold mines in this area are home to bat colonies.

The rural areas of Park Orchards, the bushland from Tindalls Road to Reynolds Road, the Currawong Bush Park, the regenerated bushland near Larnoo Drive at Donvale all provide wonderful bushland habitat and a very significant linear open space. Small tributaries with wetlands, ferns and growling grass frogs link to the Mullum at Currawong Bush Park. Kangaroos, koalas and echidnas are permanent residents in the area, and platypus live in the Creek. The last major tributary, that forms the valley of the Green Gully Linear Park, joins the Mullum Mullum Creek, near Tikalara Park, just opposite the new parklands within the subdivision as the end of Blackburn Road.

=== Plains Tract ===
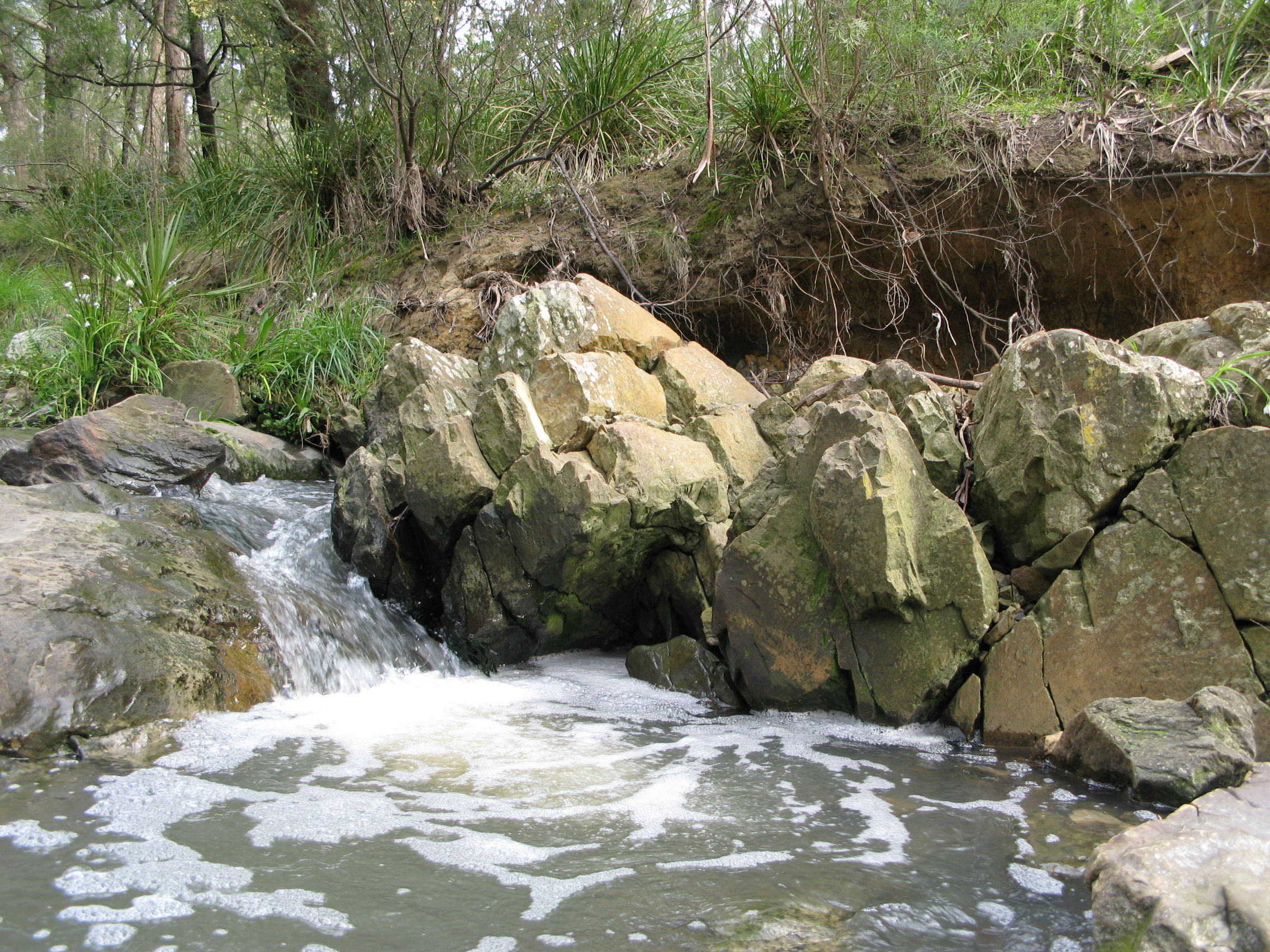
The creek through Mitcham, during low water levels

Through: Doncaster East, Templestowe

North of the Heidelberg-Warrandyte Road the creek slowly winds its way towards the Yarra River in Templestowe. Where the Mullum Mullum meets the Yarra, is also where Wurundjeri and European Cultures meet. Tikalara Park, the next stage of the Yarra Valley Metropolitan Park upstream from Petty's Orchard, is particularly a place of significance for the Wurundjeri. Here ancient scar trees and scatter sites provide physical evidence to support the documented evidence that this area was a clan meeting place of the Wurundjeri.

Pontville homestead on the Mullum Mullum Creek near the Yarra River is a site of state historic significance for its associations with early European settlement, and it is a known site of conflict between European and Wurundjeri cultures. The plains where the Mullum Mullum flows into the Yarra are home to kangaroos, wallabies, wombats and is a known platypus breeding ground. The Australian Platypus Conservancy has been studying the significant population of platypus in this area, and their research has confirmed that the Mullum Mullum Creek provides habitat for the highest density of platypus in the whole of the Yarra River catchment.

=== Settlements ===
Approximately 70–80,000 people live in the creek's catchment area. The settlements located along its course are listed below, from downstream to upstream;

- Eastern Templestowe - 4,000
- Western Warrandyte - 6,800
- Doncaster East - 26,700
- Park Orchards - 3,500
- Donvale - 11,600
- Eastern Mitcham - 8,000
- Ringwood - 15,200
- Croydon - 22,000
- Croydon Hills - 5,400

== History ==
The creek and valley is hypothesised to have been used by Indigenous Australians as a route from modern day Melbourne to Warrandyte. Early European settlement occupied well watered open grassy woodlands on either side of the ridge lines, along the main roads and railway lines, and the more open valleys. Orchards were established on the higher plateaus of Ringwood, Croydon, Park Orchards, and Templestowe.

The natural significance of the valley was recognised early by Naturalists who made excursions to Mitcham to see the remarkable bushlands and rich wildflower displays. In the 1920s and the 1930s it was proposed that the Mullum Mullum Valley should become protected bush parkland, but the remnant bushlands were not threatened by development, the scenery was not spectacular and society at the time had other priorities. After World War II, more people made excursions and day trips to Mitcham, and to Loughnan's Hill and Louhnan's Lake in Ringwood North to enjoy the views and the wonderful bushlands.

By 1946, local town planning schemes again proposed protection of this bushland as parkland, but local planning schemes were being brought together under the MMBW Metropolitan Planning Scheme. In 1954, this scheme first proposed a series of "parkway" roads along our creek valleys, which were made obsolete in the 1969 Melbourne transport plan. Many local residents who chose, in the 1930s and 1940s, to establish their residences next to these bushland, have been fighting for more than 50 years to protect these bushlands from development.

== Parklands and recreation ==
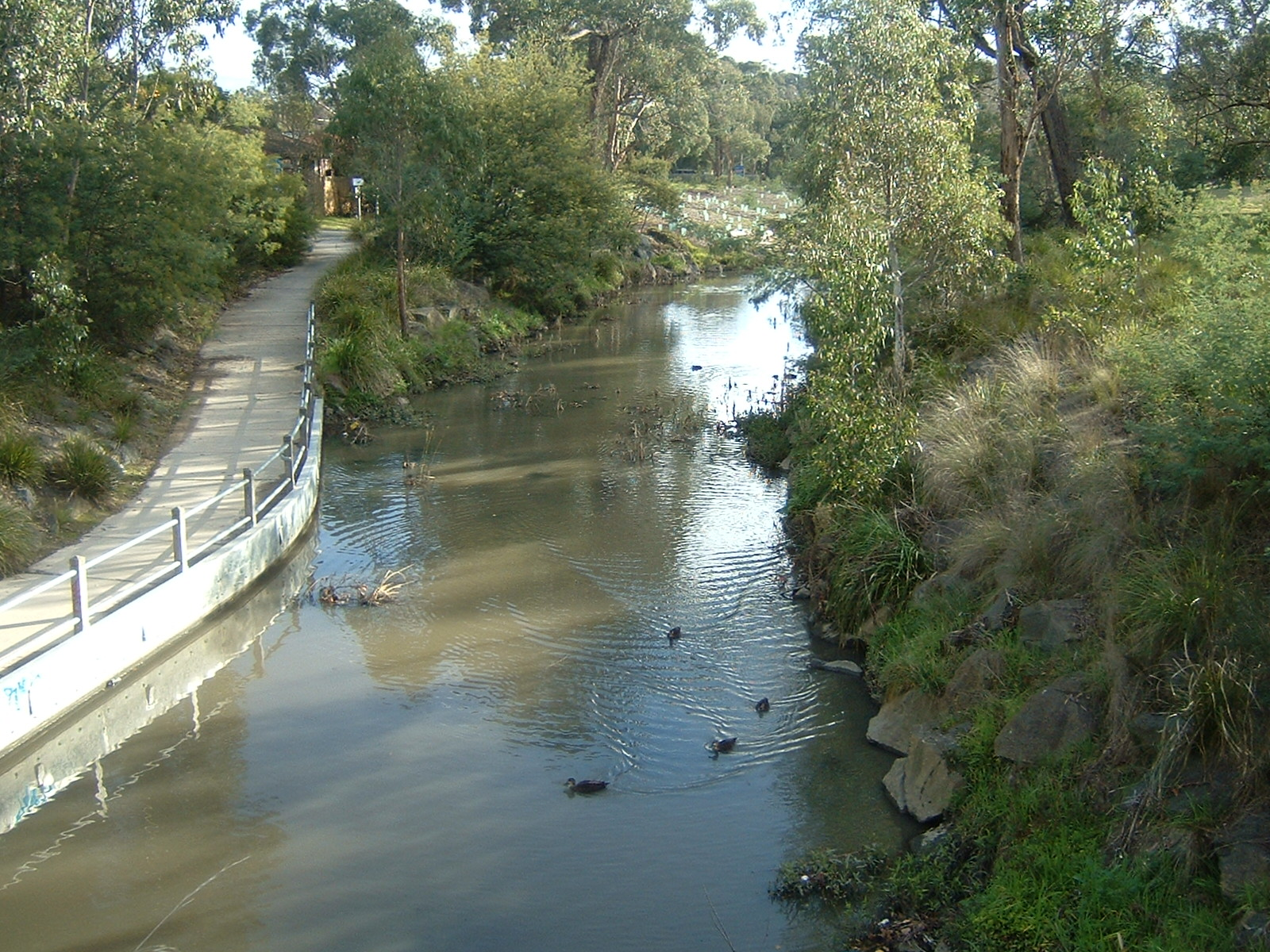
Part of the Mullum Mullum Creek Trail in Ringwood

Parks Victoria operate several areas of designated parkland adjoining the Mullum Mullum Creek. Much of this parkland, particularly in the Open Valley Tract was replanted and regenerated, whilst other areas are remnant native bushland. The Mullum Mullum Creek Trail runs through much of this parkland giving cyclists through access to the entire valley. Below is a list of parks adjoining the creek in order from its origin to where it flows into the Yarra River. Adjoining geographic features are shown in bold.

- Douglas Maggs Reserve (playground)
- Peter Vergers Reserve (tennis)
- Mullum Mullum Reserve Ringwood (football, cricket, playground)
- **Ringwood Lake**
- Schwerkolt Cottage (local museum & gardens)
- Yarran Dheran
- Hillcrest Reserve
- **Walert Creek**
- Buck Reserve (pony club & horse trails)
- Mullum Mullum Creek Linear Park - upper section
- Mullum Mullum Reserve Donvale (hockey, bowls, tennis)
- Currawong Bush Park (wildlife enclosure, education centre)
- Mullum Mullum Creek Linear Park - lower section
- **Mullum Mullum Wetlands**
- Deep Creek Reserve (baseball)
- **Domain Wetlands**
- Tikalara Park
- **Yarra River**

Most of these parklands contain paths or trails, many of which are shared use (pedestrian/cycling). The Mullum Mullum Creek Linear Park follows the course of the creek in the Open Valley Tract between Doncaster East and Donvale, this is where the Mullum Mullum Creek Trail runs beside the creek. Bicycle trails upstream include the Mullum Mullum Valley Path through the gorge and a trail through Ringwood into Croydon beside the creek.

== Crossings ==
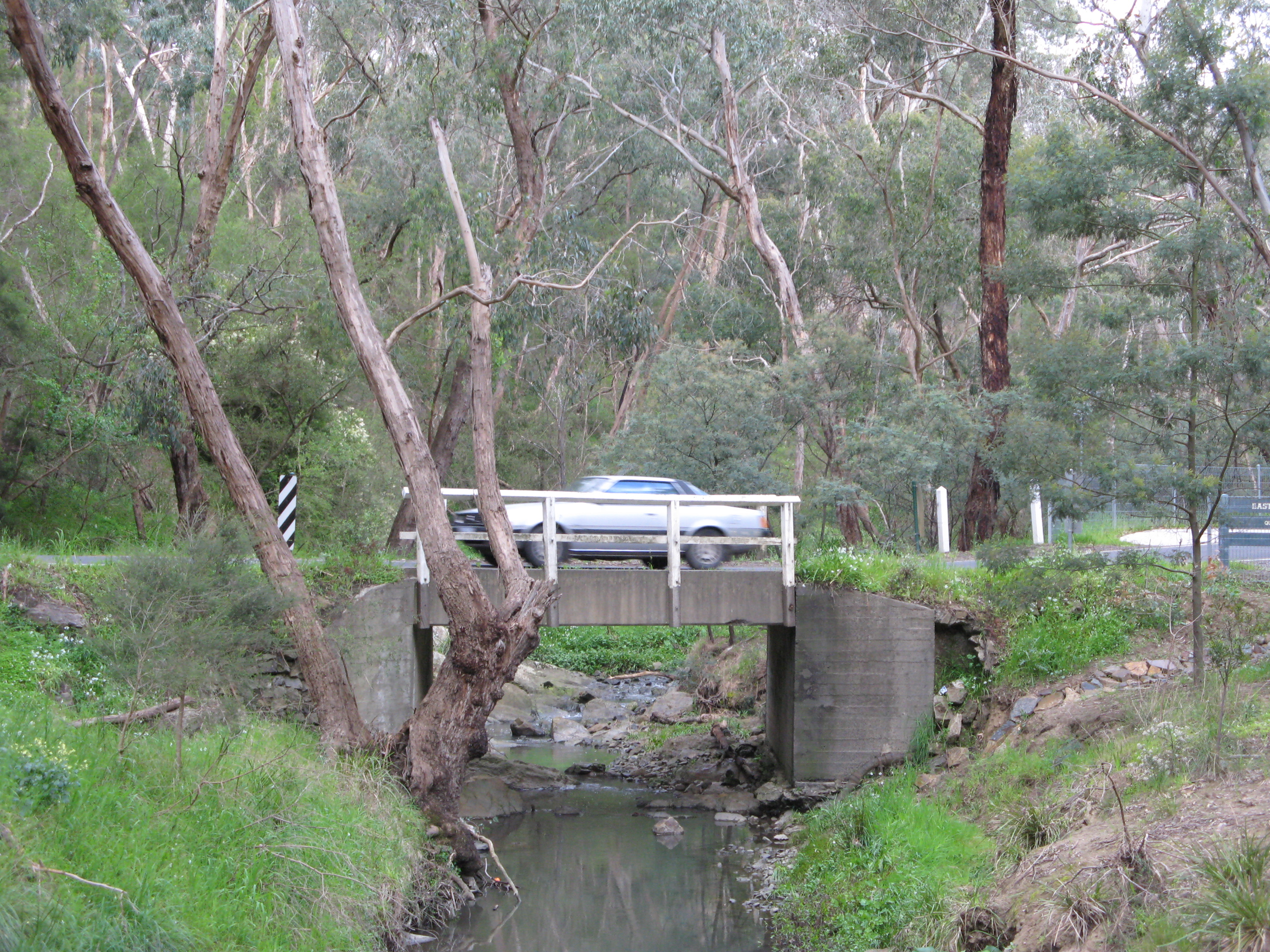
The single lane Quarry Road Bridge over the creek near Yarran Dheran

There are many crossings of the Mullum Mullum Creek including around 15 footbridges, many of which are not included in this list as they are only small local pedestrian bridges:

- The Parkway - local single lane bridge
- Manna Gum Bridge - main road and footbridge
- Reynolds Road - main road
- Donvale Pony Club Footbridge
- Tindals Road - secondary road
- Park Road - secondary road and footbridge
- Heads Road - local street (single lane)
- EastLink - tollway tunnel
- Quarry Road - local street (single lane)
- Yarran Dheran footbridges
- Deep Creek Road - secondary road
- EastLink - tollway bridges (Ringwood Interchange)
- Ringwood Bypass - main road
- Oliver Street - local street
- Oban Road - secondary road
- Kalinda Road - local street

=== Tollway tunnels ===
From 2006 to 2008 Eastlink was built, a major tollway servicing Melbourne's eastern and south-eastern suburbs. Eastlink crosses the Mullum Mullum Creek and Valley in Ringwood and Donvale. During the planning stages several proposals were considered for how this crossing would be made, some of which included a 3 km tunnel to go under the entire valley and a surface freeway requiring the destruction of the natural environment. The state government decided on a compromise and two 1.5-km tunnels were subsequently built under the creek and valley. The eastbound tunnel was named after the creek, the other being named after Dame Nellie Melba.

The irony of the situation was that the primary reason this section of the creek was in so natural a state was that it had been protected from other development through the land having been reserved for the section of the proposed F35 Scoresby Freeway (Renamed Eastlink) to join the end of the Eastern Freeway under the 1969 Melbourne Transportation Plan.

== Pollution ==
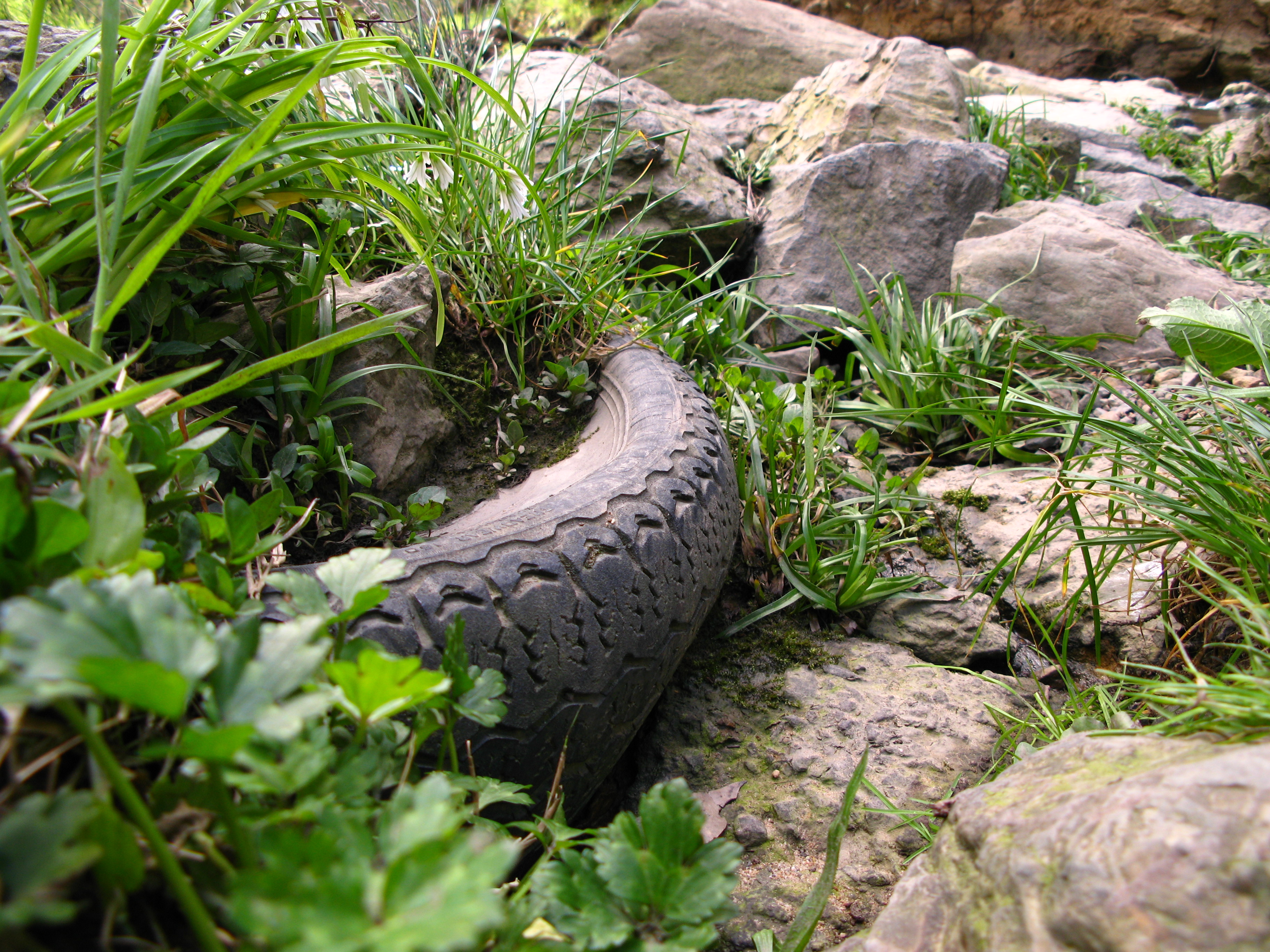
A tyre embedded in the creek bed through Mitcham

The Mullum Mullum Creek suffers from many of the problems inherent in the development of urban environments and pollution in and around the creek is unfortunately quite prominent. Two of the most significant problems affecting the creek is sewage spills after heavy rain and leakage of septic tank effluent from residential properties into watercourses and subsequently, the creek itself. This is a problem that extends to the Yarra River and has become a major issue affecting the ecology of central Victoria and state politics.

In 2005, three kayakers contracted leptospirosis and suffered bouts of delusion and lung haemorrhaging after swallowing Yarra river water. Tests were conducted in the Yarra River and the Mullum Mullum Creek and the levels of many pathogens were found to have breached local and international standards for recreational water. This is documented in a 2007 report by EPA Victoria in which levels of Human faecal matter and E. coli were recorded and documented. Other major pollutants entering the creek via stormwater drains and surface runoff include dog feces, cigarette butts, packaging and other post-consumer waste.

=== Solid pollution ===
In terms of hard pollution, plastics like bags and packaging are most common, they catch in the trees at the high-water mark on the creek banks, tires are also particularly common as well as other car parts such as batteries and pieces of metal. Large pieces of concrete somehow find their way into the creek at various locations and sit amongst the rocks almost blending in if it weren't for the exposed aggregate. Clothing is also common, particularly synthetic items such as gloves, shoes and bags, while clothing such as shirts made from organic materials break down into the environment.

== Other information ==
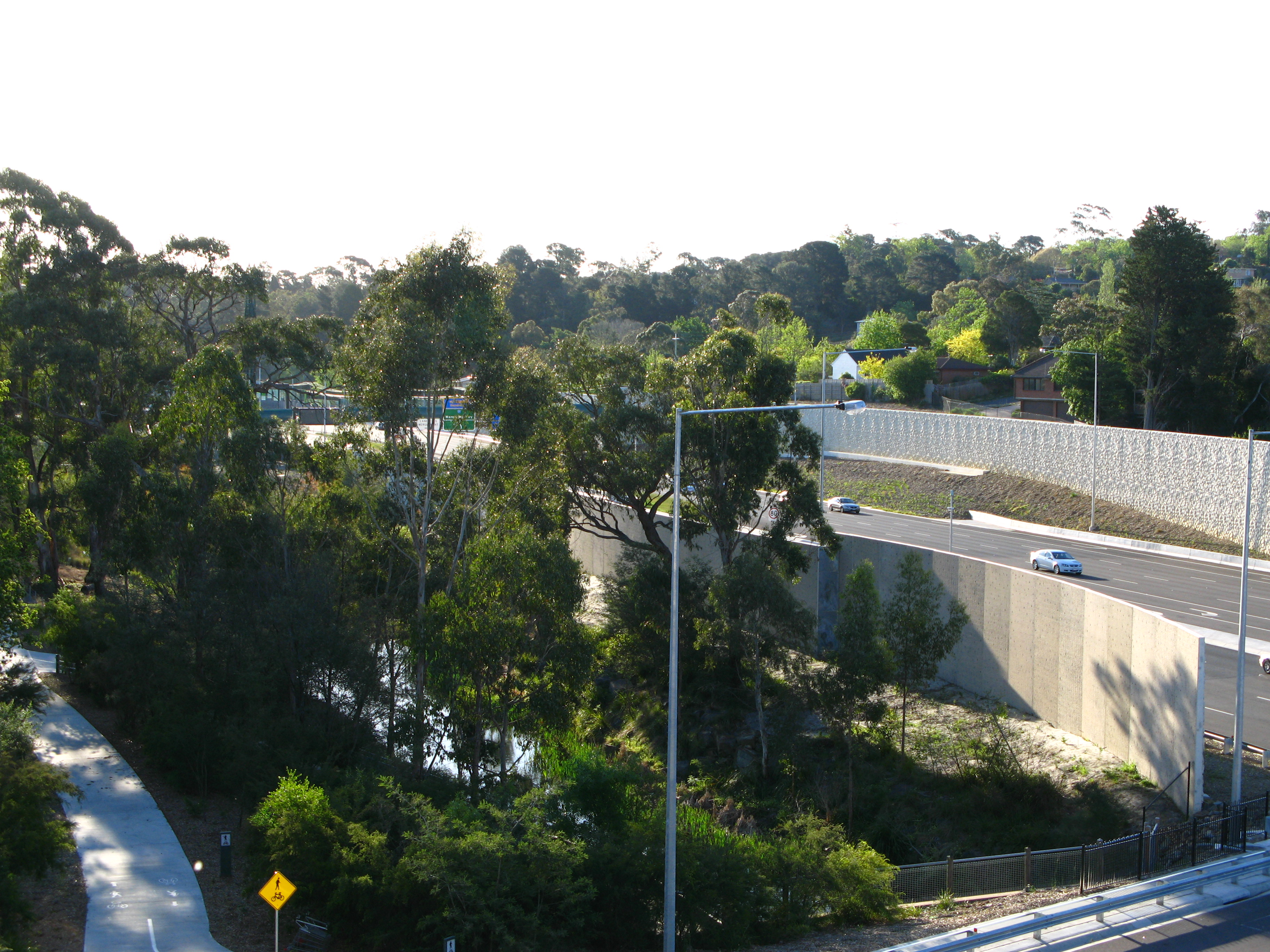
The creek as it passes between Eastland Shopping Centre and the Ringwood Bypass, through Ringwood

Many surrounding features, structures and parks borrow their names from the creek:

- Parks

Mullum Mullum Creek Linear Park
Mullum Mullum Reserve Ringwood
Mullum Mullum Reserve Donvale

- Trails & Pathways

Mullum Mullum Creek Trail
Mullum Mullum Valley Path

- Roads

Mullum Mullum Tunnel
Mullum Place
Mullum Mullum Road Ringwood

- Geographic

Mullum Mullum Wetlands
