= East Doncaster Secondary College =

Location
- 25 George Street; East Doncaster, Victoria, 3109; Australia; 37.7826°S 145.1583°E

Information
- Type: Public, co-educational
- Motto: Creating a Culture of Curiosity
- Established: 1974
- Principal: Karen Boyle
- Grades: 7 - 12
- Gender: Coed
- Enrolment: 1975
- Schedule type: 6 Periods (Mon, Wed - Fri) 6 Periods + Positive Futures (Tue)
- Hours in school day: 8:55 am - 3:15 pm
- Houses: Bradman, Chisholm, Dunlop, Sutherland
- Colours: Navy blue and yellow
- Yearbook: Courtyard Tales
- Website: Official website

Established in 1974, East Doncaster Secondary College (EDSC) is a government high school located in East Doncaster, approximately 20 kilometres east of Melbourne.

East Doncaster Secondary College is a co-educational school and has 2211 students. The college offers a broad education from Years 7 to 12 and has a strong multicultural background, with over 40 nationalities represented. East Doncaster Secondary College also provides an advanced program, ALPHA (Advanced Learning Program for High Achievers). Students taking part in this program study one year ahead of others, until the end of Year 9. In 2023, the school ranked 58th in Victoria (or 10th among Victorian public schools) by the percentage of its students' VCE study scores of 40 and above.

== Notable alumni ==
- Paul Barclay, ABC Radio broadcaster
- Ryan Corr, actor
- Doug Hilton, molecular biologist
- Isaac Quaynor, AFL player

== Sport ==
East Doncaster Secondary college offers a wide variety of sporting opportunities. Facilities installed include an indoor stadium, multi-purpose oval and undercover basketball courts.

== Music ==
East Doncaster Secondary college has a fairly large Instrumental Music Program. Instruments taught include violin, viola, cello, double bass, flute, clarinet, oboe, saxophone, tuba, euphonium, guitar, trumpet, trombone, percussion.

== See also ==
- List of high schools in Melbourne
- List of high schools in Victoria
- Victorian Certificate of Education
