= Donvale =

Suburb of Melbourne, Australia

- Suburb
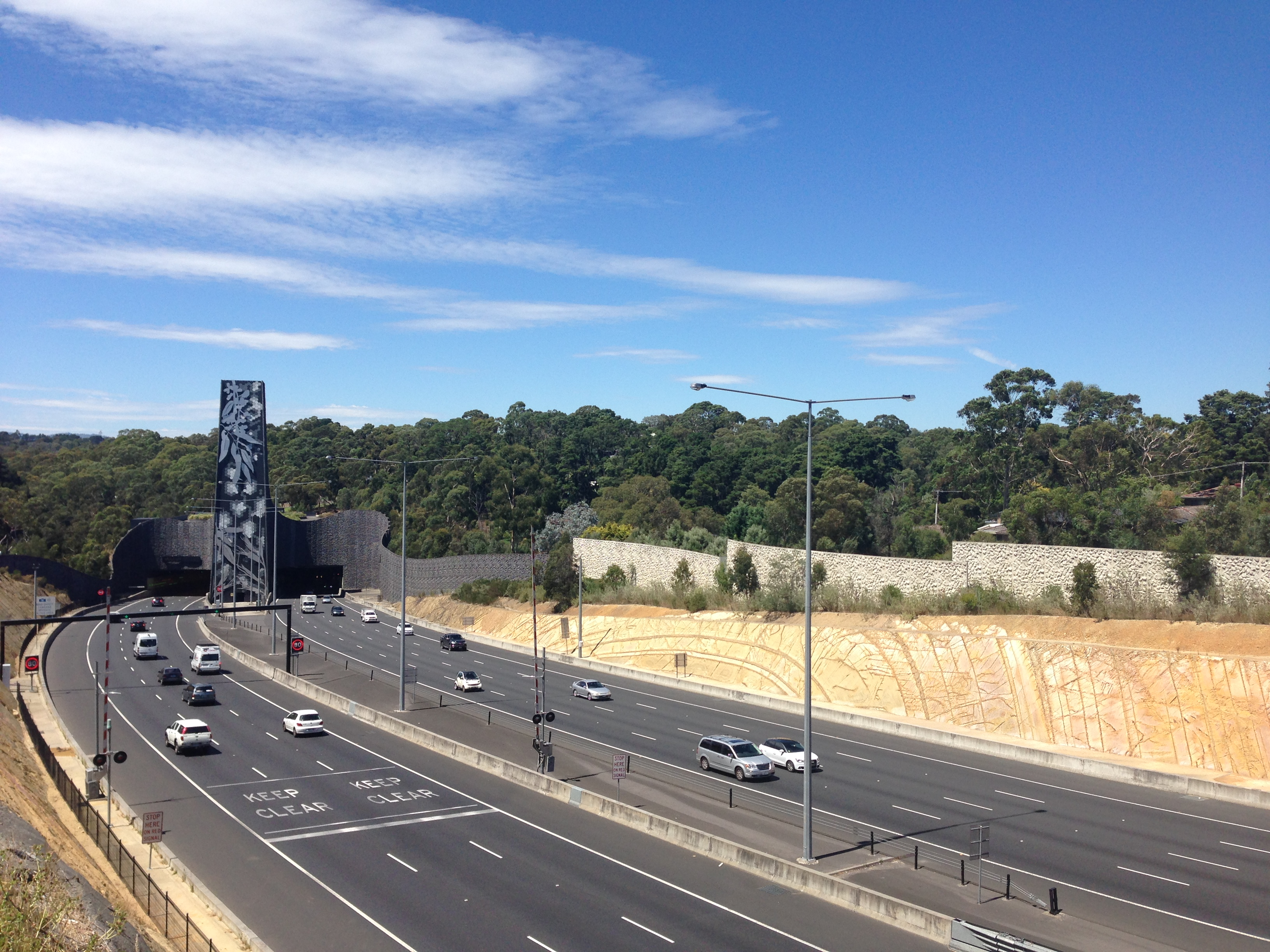
- EastLink tunnel entrances in Donvale

- Interactive map of Donvale
- Coordinates: 37.797°S 145.175°E
- Country: Australia
- State: Victoria
- City: Melbourne
- LGA: City of Manningham
- Location: 22 km (14 mi) from Melbourne

Government
  - State electorates: Warrandyte; Ringwood
  - Federal divisions: Menzies; Deakin

Area
  - Total: 12.7 km^{2} (4.9 sq mi)

Population
  - Total: 12,644 (2021 census)
  - Density: 996/km^{2} (2,579/sq mi)
- Postcode: 3111
Suburbs around Donvale
Templestowe	Warrandyte	Park Orchards
Doncaster East	Donvale	Ringwood North
Blackburn North	Nunawading	Mitcham

Donvale is a suburb of Melbourne, Victoria, Australia, 20 kilometres (12 mi) east of Melbourne's Central Business District, located within the City of Manningham local government area.

== History ==
Donvale Post Office opened on 16 September 1929 and closed in 1972. It now houses the Donvale Historical Society

Donvale is named after the two roads that border the suburb. Doncaster Road and Springvale Road.

== Demographics ==
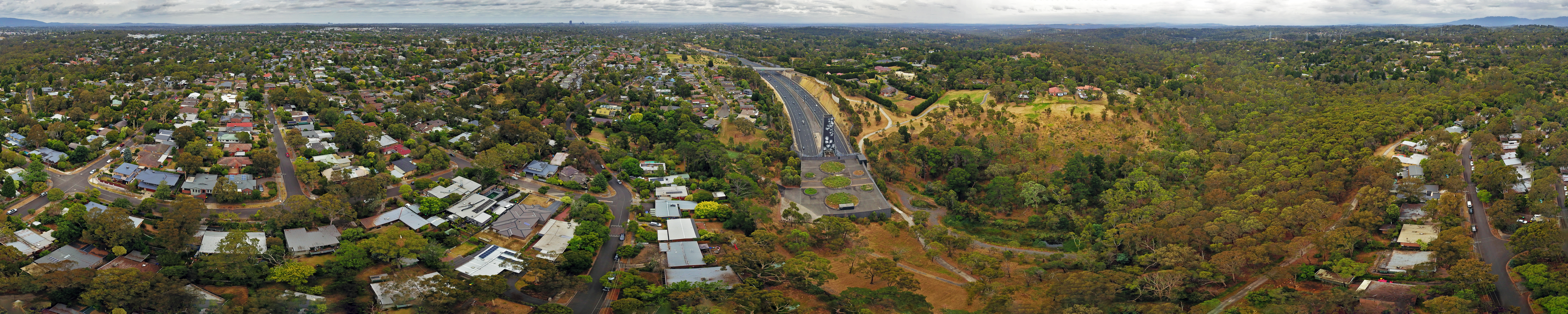
Hillcrest Reserve and the Eastlink Melba Tunnel in Donvale in January 2020

In the 2016 census, the population of Donvale was 12,347. Of this population 52.3% were female and 47.7% were male. The median/average age of the population was 44 years of age.

Nearly two-thirds (63.4%) of people living in Donvale were born in Australia. The other top responses for country of birth were China 5.6%, Malaysia 3.1%, England, 2.8%, Hong Kong 2.1% and Italy 1.6%.

Two-thirds (66.1%) of people living in Donvale speak English only. The other top languages spoken were Mandarin 6.3%, Cantonese 6.1%, Italian 3.1%, Greek 2.9% and Persian 1.4%.

In terms of religious affiliation, 29.3% indicated no religion, 22.6% indicated Catholic, 8.6% indicated Anglican, 7.9% did not state a religion and 5.9% indicated Eastern Orthodox.

== Education ==
- Donvale Christian College
- Donvale Primary School
- Heatherwood School
- Our Lady of the Pines Primary School
- Whitefriars College

Carey Donvale Baptist Grammar school

== Notable people ==
- Michael Apeness - AFL Player
- Ted Aumann - AFL Player
- Tarni Brown - AFL Player
- Nekaela Butler - AFLW Player
- Sam Collins - AFL footballer
- Stephen Donaghue KC - Solicitor-General of Australia
- Roy Donovan - AFL Player
- Raymond Edmunds – Mr. Stinky (The Donvale Rapist) – Murderer
- Lorraine Elliott - politician
- Frank Galbally - criminal defence lawyer
- Martha Gardener - broadcaster
- John Henderson - AFL Player
- Karen Knowles - singer
- Mark Korda - former president of Collingwood Football Club
- Seen Lee - weightlifter
- Leonard Long - artist
- Warren Maher - Tennis Player
- Marc Murphy - AFL footballer
- David Morris - Olympic skier
- Andy Otten - AFL Player
- Christian Petracca - AFL player and Norm Smith Medallist
- Albert Prior - AFL Player
- Paul Roos – AFL Coach and Footballer
- Bryan Rush - AFL Player
- Bernie Shannon - AFL Player
- Jo Stanley - television and radio presenter and comedian
- Anba Suriel - Bishop
- Virginia Trioli – News Presenter
- Colin Tully - AFL Player

== Points of interest and historical significance ==
- Yarran Dheran – Bushland
- Currawong Bush Park – Riparian bushland park
- Antonio Park
- Limassol Court
- Mullum Mullum Stadium And Surrounding Bushlands

== Sport ==
The suburb has one Australian Rules football team - the Donvale Magpies, competing in the Eastern Football League.

Donvale also has an indoor sports centre, with a gymnasium, complete with a sprung floor and a foam pit. The centre also has two basketball courts, which are played on every Saturday by the children in the Doncaster District Primary School Basketball Association.

== See also ==
- City of Doncaster and Templestowe – Donvale was previously within this former local government area.
