= Doncaster East, Victoria =

Doncaster East
- Suburb
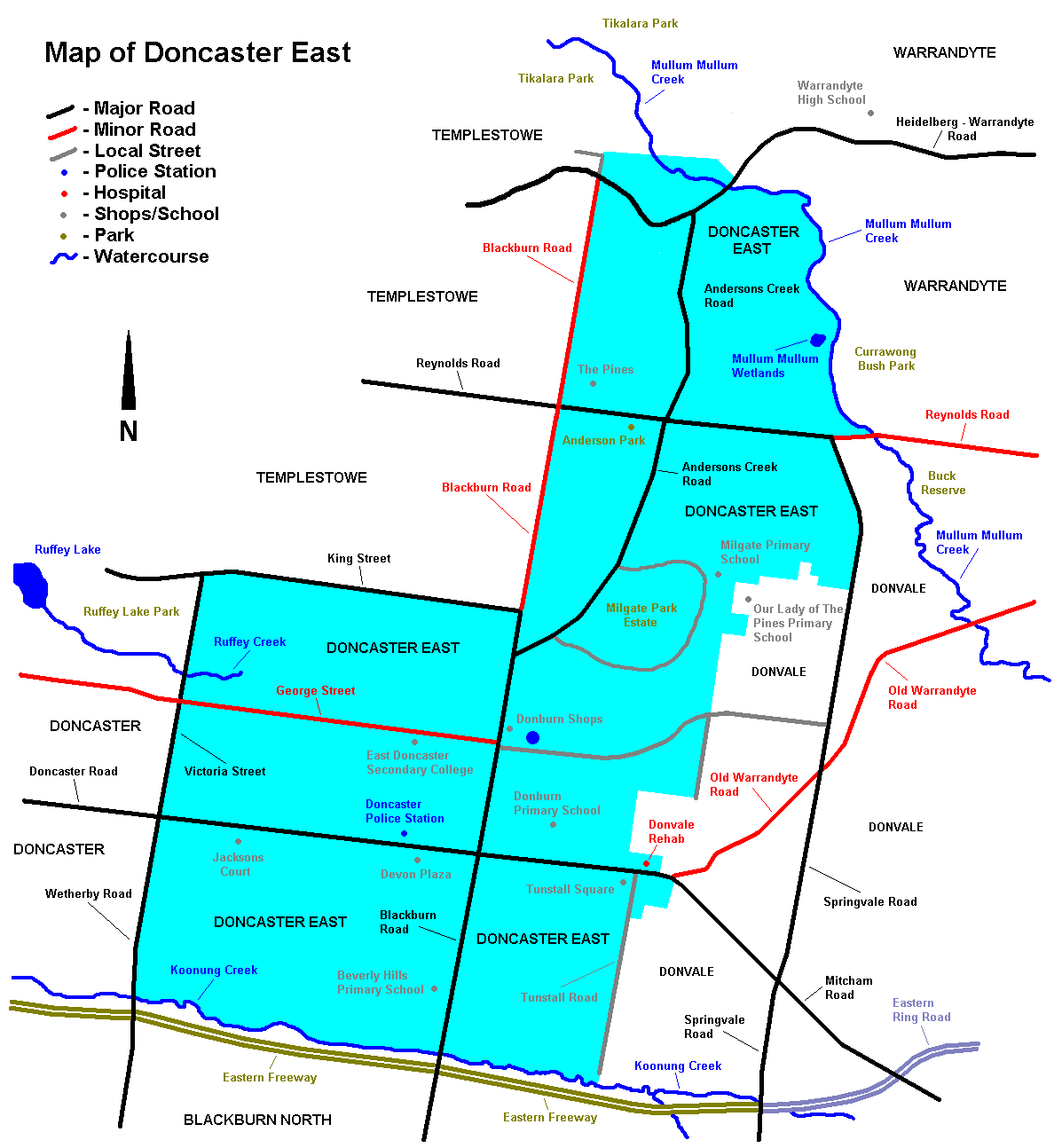
- Map of Doncaster East

- Interactive map of Doncaster East
- Coordinates: 37.783°S 145.166°E
- Country: Australia
- State: Victoria
- City: Melbourne
- LGA: City of Manningham
- Location: 20 km (12 mi) from Melbourne
- Established: 1860s, (later 1970s)

Government
  - State electorate: Warrandyte
  - Federal division: Menzies

Area
  - Total: 11.4 km^{2} (4.4 sq mi)

Population
  - Total: 30,926 (2021 census)
  - Density: 2,713/km^{2} (7,026/sq mi)
- Postcode: 3109
Suburbs around Doncaster East
Templestowe	Templestowe	Warrandyte
Doncaster	Doncaster East	Donvale
Box Hill North	Blackburn North	Nunawading

Doncaster East is a suburb of Melbourne, Victoria, Australia, 20 km east of Melbourne's Central Business District, in the City of Manningham. Doncaster East had a population of 30,926 according to the 2021 census.

It is in the hills between the Koonung Creek and the Mullum Mullum Creek.

The suburb is on 11.4km^{2} of land, a larger area than Doncaster, which it was formerly party of.

== History ==
The area was originally occupied by the Wurundjeri, Indigenous Australians of the Kulin nation, who spoke variations of the Woiwurrung language group. After European settlement, the area was used for agriculture, predominantly orchards. A small settlement known as Waldau Village was established in the 1860s by predominantly German migrants. Those settlers planted the large swathes of pine trees to serve as windbreaks to protect the farmlands and orchards, those pine trees still exist today. German Lane was the original name for George Street, and Bismarck Street the original name for Victoria Street. The names were replaced during the First World War and the present names adopted with the wartime anti-German sentiments being an influential factor in removing German-influenced names from the local areas in favour of more overtly British names.

The Post Office opened on 8 August 1887. A Tunstall Square office was open from 1965 until 1990.

Like much of the City of Manningham, Doncaster East was predominantly covered in fruit orchards for some time before subdivision began and it became a contiguous part of Melbourne. Housing estates began to replace orchards in the 1960s, generally along Doncaster Road, in the southern half of the suburb. The north half of the suburb was developed through the 1970s and 1980s, with the last orchard being removed in the 1990s. As the young parents who moved into these estates now retire and move away, many houses from the 60s and 70s were converted into multi-tenant units.

== Geography ==
Watercourses include Ruffey Creek.

The native vegetation of Doncaster East has been almost totally cleared, notable exceptions being the northeast of the suburb around the Mullum Mullum Creek, where small areas of native riparian bushland remain. Many small areas of Pine Trees were planted by early German settlers.

== Indigenous traditional ownership ==
The formally recognised traditional owners for the area in which Doncaster is located are the Wurundjeri people. The Wurundjeri people are represented by the Wurundjeri Woi Wurrung Cultural Heritage Aboriginal Corporation.

== Demographics ==
In the 2021 Census, there were 30,926 people living within Doncaster East.

== Community ==
Doncaster East has had a significant Chinese minority for many years.

== Education ==
- East Doncaster Secondary College, located on George Street, is a government secondary school, established in 1974.

== Eastlink tollway ==
The EastLink tollway project was completed and opened in 2008.

== Notable people ==
- Alisa Camplin – Aerial skier, Olympic gold medallist
- Adam Kingsley – AFL Coach, Greater Western Sydney Giants
- Isaac Quaynor – AFL player, Collingwood football club
- Michele Timms – Basketballer, Olympic silver medallist

== See also ==
- City of Doncaster and Templestowe – Doncaster East was previously within this former local government area.
- Milgate Park Estate
- Doncaster
- List of Melbourne suburbs
