= Dandenong Valley Parklands =

Public parks in south east Melbourne, Victoria, Australia

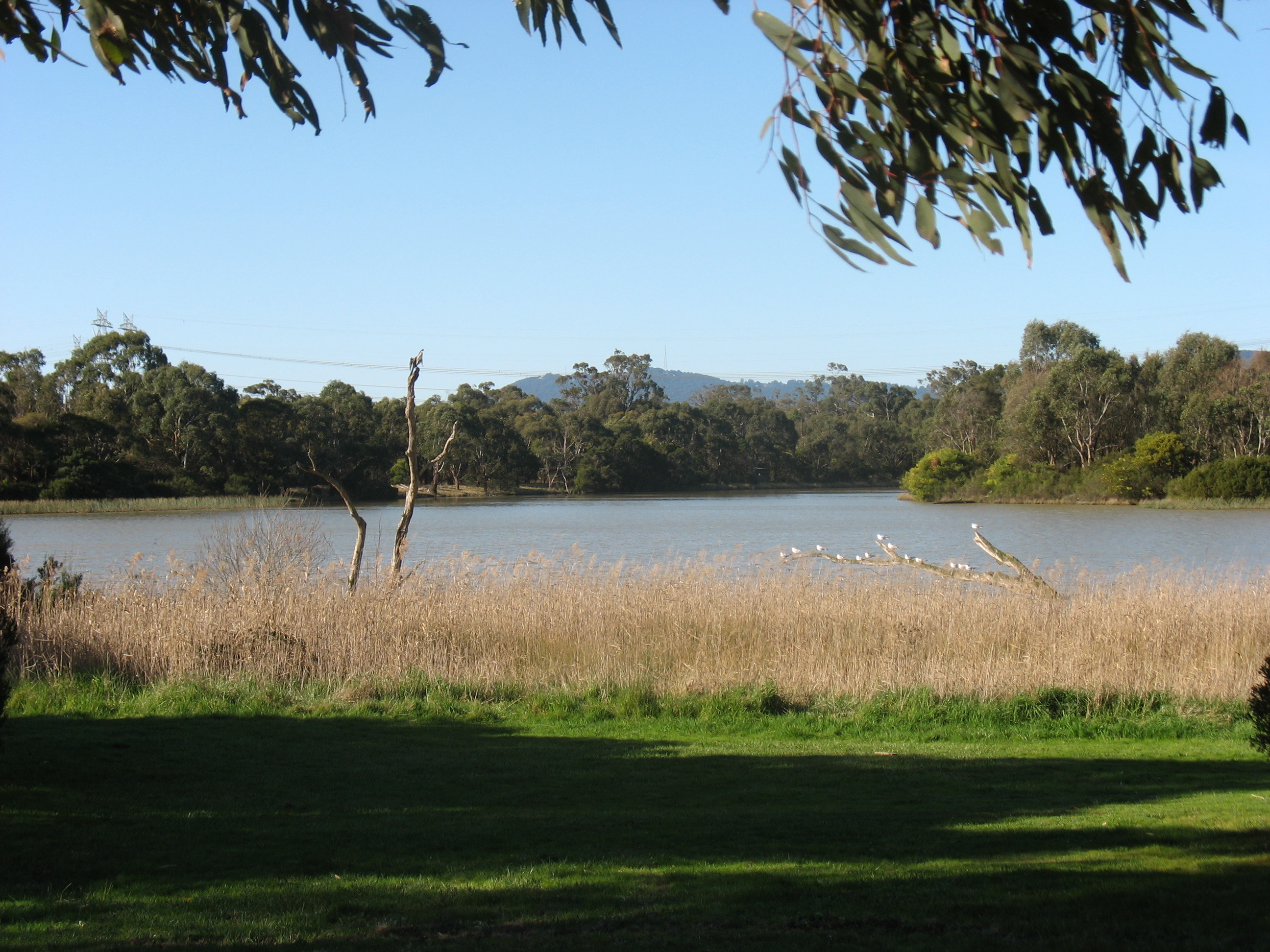
- The lake in the centre of Jells Park

- Location within Melbourne
- Type: Metropolitan parks
- Location: South east suburbs of Melbourne, Victoria, Australia
- Coordinates: 37.896711°S 145.196394°E
- Area: 1,306 hectares
- Elevation: 100 m (330 ft)
- Opened: 1976
- Manager: Primarily Parks Victoria (also Melbourne Water, City of Monash, City of Knox, City of Whitehorse)
- Visitors: 1.5 million (in 2006)
- Status: Open all year
- Paths: Dandenong Creek Trail, Scotchmans Creek Trail, EastLink Trail
- Vegetation: Swampy woodland, swampy riparian woodland, valley heathy forest
- Website: Parks Victoria

The Dandenong Valley Parklands are a collection of public parks and open space reserves along the Dandenong Creek, an urban creek in southeastern Melbourne, Victoria, Australia. The term refers only to the parklands along and in close proximity to the middle main stem of Dandenong Creek, stretching from Boronia Road in the north to Wellington Road in the south through the suburbs of Vermont South, Wantirna, Wantirna South and Wheelers Hill, even though there are a lot more parks and reserves along the extended catchment of the creek.

The parklands are separated into six individual parks, roughly following the middle Dandenong Creek north-south for about 10 km (6.2 mi). These include a range of landscapes including remnant bushland, grassland, artificial lakes, retarding basins, wetlands, and open parkland. The parklands form a large part of the habitat corridor of Dandenong Creek, along with some nearby public spaces such as the Police Road Retarding Basin/Tirhatuan Park, Dandenong Police Paddocks Reserve, Dandenong Wetlands (Melbourne Water Recreation Area) and Churchill National Park.

== History ==
The land of the Dandenong Valley Parklands was reserved by the Melbourne and Metropolitan Board of Works in 1973 as part of a plan to create more public open spaces. Plans for the Parklands were originally announced in 1975, and the first publicly accessible section, Jells Park, was opened in 1976.

Management of the Parklands was transferred from Melbourne Water to the newly formed Melbourne Parks and Waterways in 1994. This organisation was absorbed by Parks Victoria in 1996, and ownership of the Parklands was formally transferred to Parks Victoria in 1997. Following the formal termination of Melbourne Parks and Waterways in 2001, the land was transferred to the State Government of Victoria, and now exists as crown land.

Two civic reports on the Dandenong Valley Parklands have been written, titled Future Directions Plans. They were released in 1995 (by Melbourne Parks and Waterways) and 2006 (by Parks Victoria).

In 1989, the Friends of Dandenong Valley Parklands was formed, and continues to contribute to maintenance of the parks, including revegetation, weeding, installing nest boxes, and habitat monitoring.

== Parks ==
=== Constituent parks ===
- Koomba Park
- Bushy Park Wetlands
- Nortons Park
- Shepherds Bush
- Jells Park
- Tirhatuan Park

=== Nearby parks and waterbodies ===
- Ringwood Lake
- Blackburn Lake Sanctuary
- Campbells Croft Reserve
- Caribbean Gardens
- Stamford Park (under construction)
- Rowville Lakes
- Dandenong Police Paddocks Reserve
- Churchill National Park
- Dandenong Wetlands
- Lysterfield Lake Park

=== Nearby trails ===
- Dandenong Creek Trail
- EastLink Trail
- Blind Creek Trail

== See also ==
- Dandenong Ranges National Park
