= Longbeach Trail =

The Longbeach Trail is a shared-use bicycle and pedestrian path running from Patterson River, Carrum, along the southwestern side of the Edithvale-Seaford Wetlands, to the Mordialloc Creek, Mordialloc. In Mordialloc, it connects to the Mordialloc Creek Trail and the Bay Trail and in the Carrum it connects to the Bay Trail and Dandenong Creek Trail.

The trail is 8 km long and is mostly flat. It consists of some concrete sections but is mostly gravel. It passes through the suburbs of Aspendale, Aspendale Gardens, Bonbeach, Carrum, Chelsea, Edithvale and Mordialloc.

An interactive map of the trail as well as others in the Melbourne area is available from the 'External links' section in this article.

== Following the Path ==
The Longbeach Trail begins at the Patterson River (map here).

- The path begins with a short downhill slope, running north. It runs along the western side of the Wannarkladdin Wetlands that it passes.
- The path then winds through Bicentennial Park in Chelsea Heights. Following the path north, stay on the main track heading up through the centre of the park, then merge right towards Thames Promenade. Then, turn right along the gravel path towards the traffic lights.
- The path crosses Thames Promenade at a signalised crossing and then continues north.
- The path crosses Edithvale Road at another signalised crossing, continuing north.
- The path continues towards Mordialloc. Stay on the gravel path past Browns Reserve and past Mordialloc College.
- The path passes underneath the Frankston Line and the gravel section ends at a concrete path. Turn right towards Mordialloc.
- Cross Pompei Bridge over the Mordialloc Creek and immediately after U-turn right. The path off to the side of the river is the beginning of the Mordialloc Creek Trail; but the Longbeach Trail continues down the ramp and underneath the Nepean Highway heading towards the beach.
- The path ends near the Tour de Cafe at Mordialloc Beach, connecting to the Bay Trail, which yields access to the City via a shared pathway.

The Longbeach Trail passes Chelsea pony club, many golf courses, Bicentennial Park, Aspendale Gardens Primary School, St. Louis de Montford Primary School, Yammerbrook Reserve, Browns Reserve, Mordialloc College, Mordialloc Creek and Attenborough Park. Whilst dogs are allowed on the trail, they must be on a lead at all times.
