= History of the City of Monash =

The City of Monash was created on 15 December 1994 when the Kennett Liberal government amalgamated local councils all over Victoria, merging a substantial portion of the former City of Oakleigh with the whole of the former City of Waverley.

== The first settlers ==
=== Aboriginal People ===
For thousands of years before European settlement the Bunurong people dwelled in the green, lush land between Mordialloc on the eastern shore of Port Phillip, inland to Nunawading. When camped in Mulgrave, the Bunurong lived off emus and kangaroos which were abundant in the area. Their hunting grounds extended up to the Yarra River to the north-west, the Dandenong Ranges to the east and the hills down to Western Port and Port Phillip to the south and south-west. The most famous Bunurong was the elder Derrimut, to whom the first colonists constructed a monument in the Melbourne Cemetery.

By the 1840s and 1850s, reduction of their hunting grounds, draining of the swamps and introduction of European diseases such as smallpox and measles effectively ended their ability to maintain a traditional lifestyle.

=== Thomas Napier and Alexander Scott ===
Thomas Napier was a Scottish builder who arrived in Tasmania (then called Van Diemen's Land) in the early 1830s, and then proceeded to the Port Phillip District (Melbourne) where he bought up property at present day Collins Street. He then built several residences, but soon turned to squatting. In 1839, Napier settled on the banks of the Dandenong Creek and built his homestead in Jells Park. He was the first European settler in the Mulgrave Parish.

In 1841, Thomas Napier sold his property to Alexander Scott, who then named the run Bushy Park Run because of the native fauna. When Scott died, his wife Madeline continued to run Bushy Park and, with the help (and partnership) of brothers Francis and John Drew, managed it until 1846. Meanwhile, Thomas Napier had returned to the Port Phillip District and became associated with Essendon and Fitzroy are named after him. Bushy Park Run survives more or less as the Bushy Park Wetlands.

=== Reverend James Clow ===
In August 1838, Rev James Clow bought Corhanwarrabul Run, land 36 miles (58 km) from Dandenong Creek in the vicinity of Wellington Road. He had associated with the local Aboriginals and had found them to be friendly and talented musically and physically. His homestead was named Tirhatuan and was located on the north side of Wellington Road.

=== The Scotchmans Creek Run ===
The area of present-day Mount Waverley once was full of creeks and bushland. One main creek that flowed into the Yarra River was Scotchmans Creek. In January 1840, John McMillan leased 13 km^{2} of land focussed around Scotchmans Creek. The boundaries of the run extended from Princes Highway (Dandenong Road) south-east to Wellington Road, north along Springvale Road and east along Waverley Road. McMillan ran a herd of about 400 cattle, grew vegetables and planted European trees. At the end of 1846, McMillan transferred the rights to the run to John McKean. Some time later, it passed into the hands of Van Amstel, after whom Van Amstel Park in Mount Waverley is named.

=== The Township of Waverley ===
In 1852, Dr James Silverman retired to New Holland to seek his fortune as a pioneer. Buying 160 acres (0.65 km^{2}) for £760 on the corner of High Street Road and Stephensons Road, he surveyed and subdivided the land, naming it the Township of Waverley. This name was later used for the naming of suburbs and then for a municipality.

=== Other pioneer settlers ===
The area of Mulgrave/Waverley was settled by successful pioneers. The area specialised in fruits. In 1849, Joseph Jells purchased land on present day Jells Road. With a frontage on Dandenong Creek, Jells Park was named after him.

Next door John Wheeler lived, having settled on 28 July 1854. Wheeler's claim was 100 acres (0.40 km^{2}) in area and was located south of Jells’ run. The area is now known as Wheelers Hill and includes land further south to the hills. Another settler in this area was Thomas Armstrong who settled further south of Wheelers. Armstrong's property was separated by Bennett's property and bordered Wellington Rd.

The most famous settler was pioneer Sir Redmond Barry. Redmond was a judge who passed sentences on several bushrangers including Ned Kelly. Redmond owned two large properties in Monash. Syndal was situated near present-day Syndal Station and occupied 114 acres (0.46 km^{2}). St Johnswood was situated further north-west and occupied 160 acres (0.65 km^{2}).

Other settlers included John Drummie, Patrick Brennan, Hugh and Mary Rourke, John Gallaghers and Bennetts.

== From parish to city ==
Southern NSW (now State of Victoria) had settlements at Port Phillip in the centre, Portland to the west and Gippsland to the east. Settlers first settled at Port Phillip District (Melbourne) and had sailed along the east coast and settled along the shore lines. A shipping service between Gippsland and Melbourne was created, but it soon became obvious that a road service was required to link the settlements over land. In 1851, the State of Victoria was established and the construction of a road linking St Kilda to Dandenong was approved - Princes Highway/Dandenong Rd. On completion, the route passed through the south-west corner of the Parish of Oakleigh/Mulgrave where the village of Oakleigh was located. Shortly following, a telegraph line was built and in 1865, Cobb and Co coaches began operating as a transportation service. These coaches made a one-stop journey back and forth, the stop at Oakleigh Village.

On 19 January 1857, the Parish of Mulgrave and Oakleigh were gazetted as the Road District of Mulgrave and Oakleigh respectively. These two road districts later merged as the Shire of Oakleigh on 1 December 1871. On 13 March 1891, the Shire of Oakleigh split when the south and centre ridings formed the Borough of Oakleigh, renaming the rest as the Shire of Mulgrave.

In 1949 and again in 1959, land was ‘transferred’ from Mulgrave to Oakleigh. The size of the Shire of Mulgrave now was reduced to 23 square miles (60 km^{2}). The Shire of Mulgrave and Borough of Oakleigh progressed through World War One, the Great Depression and World War Two. New Shire offices were later opened at Notting Hill. In April 1961, the Shire of Mulgrave was gazetted as the City of Waverley, the name taken from Dr James Silverman's property- Township of Waverley. At the same time, the Borough of Oakleigh formed the City of Oakleigh. Finally, on 15 December 1994, the City of Waverley and most of the City of Oakleigh merged back as The City Of Monash.
