= Koomba Park =

Park in Wantirna, Australia

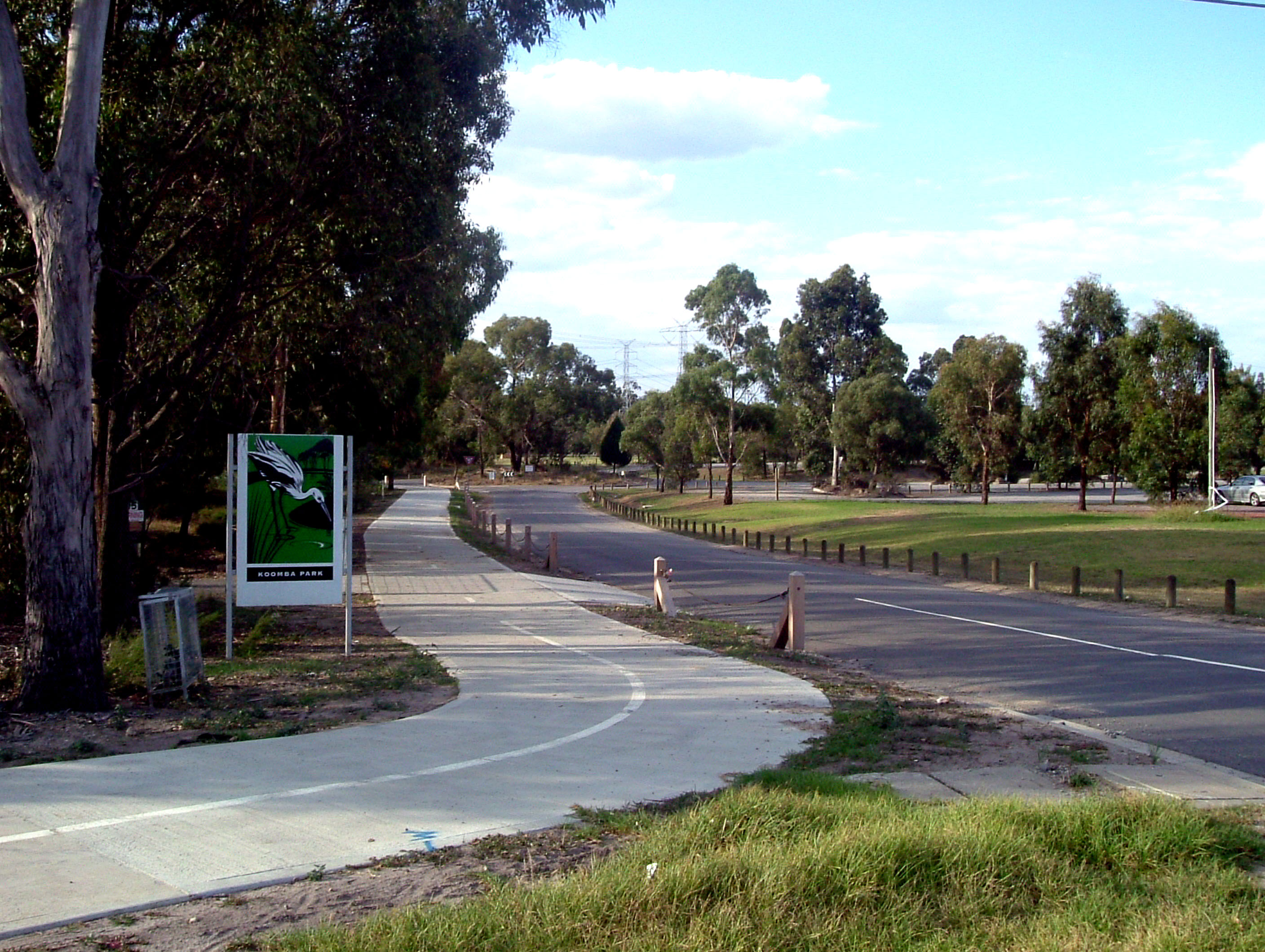
- The southern vehicle entrance to Koomba Park
- Interactive map of Koomba Park
- Type: Metropolitan Park
- Location: Wantirna, Victoria, Australia
- Coordinates: 37.8525°S 145.2119°E
- Area: 92 hectares (230 acres) (33 hectares open to public)
- Created: December 1981
- Operator: Parks Victoria and VicRoads
- Status: Open all year

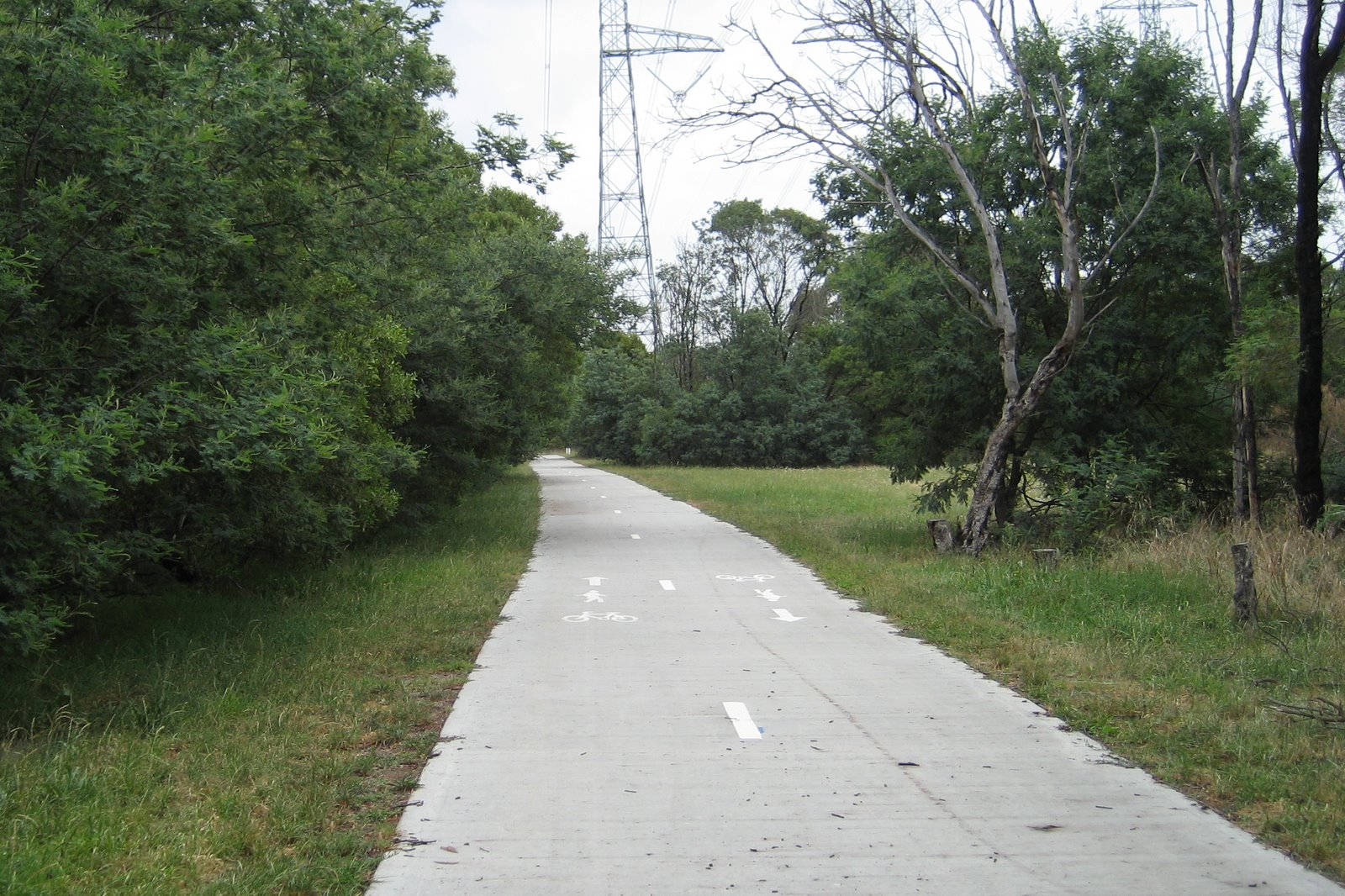
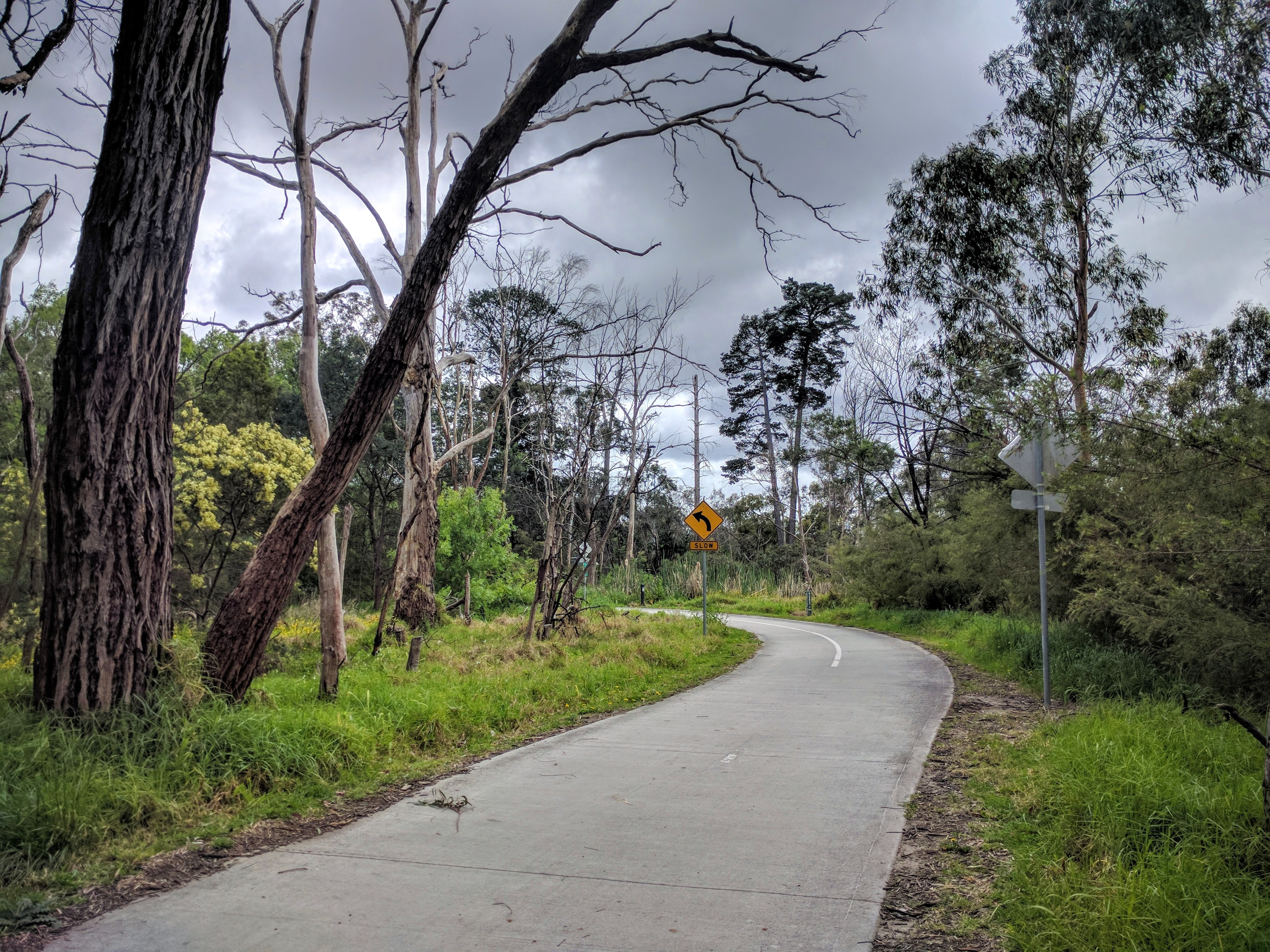
The Dandenong Creek Trail and EastLink Trail run along this section of path in the north of the park (looking south towards Burwood Highway)

Koomba Park is one of the parks comprising the Dandenong Valley Parklands in the eastern suburbs of Melbourne, Australia. It consists of 92 hectares (230 acres) of which 33 hectares (82 acres) are publicly accessible, and is bounded by Dandenong Creek, Boronia Road, EastLink, Mountain Highway and Burwood Highway in a clockwise direction. It is managed primarily by VicRoads and Parks Victoria. The park opened in December 1981, and its land was previously used for cattle grazing and apple orchards. The surrounding area is still used for grazing. There are three major power transmission lines running through the park: Rowville-Templestowe Single Circuit Southern (first and second) and Rowville-Ringwood.

In 2019, a study found that Koomba Park was one of the least used areas of the Dandenong Valley Parklands, and also garnered the least satisfaction from park users when compared to Jells Park and Tirhatuan Park.

== Ecology ==
The park forms part of the wildlife corridor of Dandenong Creek, and contains a large amount of riparian forest, as well as wetlands and swamps and some areas of indigenous revegetation. Common mammals in the park include various species of bats, possums, and sugar gliders. There is a bird hide adjacent to one of the ponds, from which many species of native birds are observable. The park also provides habitat to a variety of indigenous plant species, many of which are threatened or endangered. Koomba Park has several man-made water bodies, and is classified in the Urban Floodway Zone since it is prone to inundation.

== Paths and trails ==
=== Cycle paths ===
Both Dandenong Creek Trail and EastLink Trail run through the park on the primary north–south concrete path, before the trails split near the southern car park. All trails were originally of fine crushed gravel, but in mid-late 2007, the existing Dandenong Creek Trail was upgraded to 3-metre (9.8 ft) wide concrete bike path from Boronia Road south to the former toilet block as part of the construction of EastLink. A new path of the same standard was constructed which leads further south to the Mountain Highway intersection with Burwood Highway, which forms part of the EastLink Trail, opened in mid-2008. The primary path exit at the north of the park leads under Boronia Road and continues to run alongside the Dandenong Creek while the southern path (the EastLink Trail) leads further along EastLink to the south, and the southwest path (the Dandenong Creek Trail) crosses the Dandenong Creek and meets the Burwood Highway in Vermont South, with this link being constructed as a boardwalk and opened in 1997.

Koomba Park constitutes part of the Opperman Trails, a tribute to cyclist Sir Hubert Opperman. The Lands End Trail is signposted through the park, including an information board about Opperman.

=== Walking paths ===
There are a number of gravel walking paths on the eastern side of Dandenong Creek.

There is an elevated boardwalk winding southwesterly through the Dandenong Creek wetlands, serving as a section of the Dandenong Creek Trail. In 2023, the Koomba Park Boardwalk was closed to public access "for the foreseeable future" due to "ongoing safety concerns". As of April 2026, access is still closed.

== Facilities ==
Koomba Park has a large carpark at the southern end, on a service road off Mountain Highway, which is shared with Wantirna Reserve. There is another smaller carpark at the northern end off Boronia Road. A joint picnic shelter and toilet block (which was originally a sports pavilion) existed in the park for some time, but was demolished in mid-2008 due to numerous crime incidents. Electric barbecues were also removed at the same time. Information boards are located at the north and south pedestrian entrances to the park. A drinking fountain is also located at the junction of Dandenong Creek Trail and EastLink Trail.

=== Wantirna Reserve ===
The adjoining Wantirna Reserve, managed by Knox City Council and located at the southern end of the park, features a sporting oval with an adjacent clubhouse and cricket nets which caters for Australian rules football and cricket. The reserve also contains the Wantirna Tennis Club, as well as a scout hall and playground. All facilities are accessed by dirt roads with parking areas provided. The Victorian Jazz Archive is also located on the left side of the southern entrance to Koomba Park.

== Incidents ==
The park is known by locals and the Victoria Police to be a meeting point for drug deals and gay sex, due to its remoteness from residential areas and densely wooded forests, especially at night. There have been several attempts to decrease criminal activity in the park, including regular patrolling. In 2006, the male toilets were permanently closed in a bid to curb gay sex meetings. In late 2008, the entire toilet block/picnic shelter was demolished in a further effort.

On 7 May 2010 at approximately 1 am, a drug deal in the park lead to the stabbing murder of a 41-year-old man from Dandenong.

In 2010, a 50-year-old man fell from an elevated boardwalk in Koomba Park whilst cycling, suffering fatal injuries.
