= Bob McIntosh =

Australian rules footballer

Personal information
- Full name: Robert John McIntosh
- Born: 17 October 1921; Mordialloc, Victoria
- Died: 22 December 2008 (aged 87); Ararat, Victoria
- Original team: Parkdale Amateurs
- Height: 183 cm (6 ft 0 in)
- Weight: 83 kg (183 lb)

Playing career^{1}
Years	Club	Games (Goals)
1945–46	St Kilda	4 (0)
- ^{1} Playing statistics correct to the end of 1946.

Robert John McIntosh (17 October 1921 – 22 December 2008) was an Australian rules footballer who played with St Kilda in the Victorian Football League (VFL).

McIntosh also served in World War II, representing Victoria in the Territory Forces football championship in 1944.

He later moved to Ararat and died in 2008.
