= EastLink Trail =

Suburban trail in Melbourne, Australia

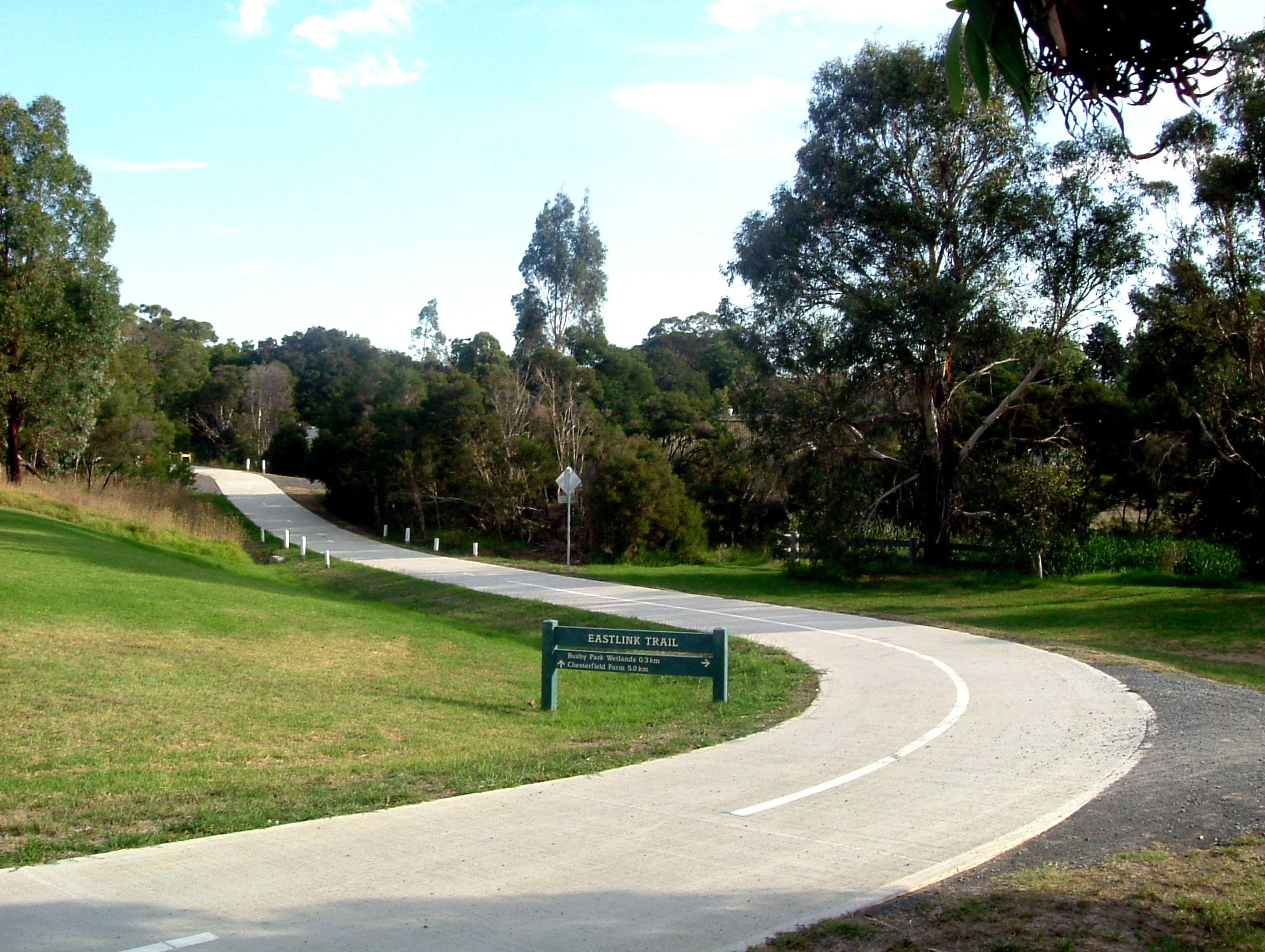
- The EastLink Trail in southern Koomba Park
- Length: Approx 28 km
- Location: Melbourne, Victoria, Australia
- Difficulty: Mostly easy
- Hazards: Road underpasses regularly flood; rough path surface in places
- Surface: Mainly concrete.
- Hills: Mostly flat, hilly in the north
- Trains: Ringwood Station, Heatherdale Station, Yarraman Station
- Tram: None

The EastLink Trail is a shared use path for cyclists and pedestrians in the outer eastern/southeastern suburbs of Melbourne, Victoria, Australia. The trail gets its name from the north-south EastLink tollway, along which it follows for most of its length from Ringwood to Dandenong, until it joins the Dandenong Creek Trail near the Dandenong Bypass bridge at the tri-suburban junction between Dandenong, Dandenong South and Keysborough.

== Route ==
The path passes through or near to:

- Mullum Mullum Valley, Ringwood Bypass, Schwerkolt Cottage, and Eastland (Mullum Mullum Creek Trail)
- Simpsons Park / Heatherdale Reserve Proclamation Park
- Koomba Park (briefly combined with Dandenong Creek Trail) and Wantirna Reserve
- Blind Creek / Llewellyn Park Complex and the Blind Creek Trail
- Nortons Park, Shepherds Bush and Drummies Bridge Reserve
- Jells Park (including trail network) and Chesterfield Farm
- Corhanwarrbul Creek Wetlands, Dandenong Creek and Tirhatuan Park (briefly rejoining the Dandenong Creek Trail between Wellington Road and EastLink-Dandenong Creek overpass)
- Oakwood Park, Fotheringham Reserve, Greaves Reserve and Mile Creek

The trail ends after crossing the Dandenong Creek via a low-water bridge just upstream of the Dandenong Bypass overbridge, where it permanently joins the Dandenong Creek Trail. The Dandenong Creek Trail then follows the creek along the EastLink tollway as far as Bangholme, where the creek joins the Eumemmerring Creek to form the Patterson River, which the trail continues following on the opposite bank to the National Water Sports Centre and the Longbeach Trail. After traversing riverside through Patterson Lakes and Carrum, the trail connects with the Bay Trail at the Nepean Highway–Frankston line–Station Street bridges before terminating at the creek's mouth into the Beaumaris Bay near Carrum Beach.

Footbridges cross EastLink at a number of points along the trail, and another takes path users across the Princes Highway. Two additional footbridges completed construction in 2009: a footbridge over Maroondah Highway and a 60 m footbridge over Burwood Highway at the intersection with Mountain Highway.

== Connections ==
The EastLink Trail connects to numerous other paths: To the Mullum Mullum Creek Trail in the north and close by is the Koonung Creek Trail. Centrally it connects to the Blind Creek Trail just south of High Street and comes close to the Scotchmans Creek Trail. At Ferntree Gully Road it connects to the Ferny Creek Trail. In the south at Dandenong, it connects to the Dandenong Creek Trail. At Patterson Lakes, it connects to the Longbeach Trail via the Mornington Peninsula Freeway–Wells Road bridges and a riverside trail on the opposite bank of the Patterson River. At Carrum, it connects to the Bay Trail at the Nepean Highway–Frankston line–Station Road bridges.

Two sections of the EastLink Trail utilise sections of the older Dandenong Creek Trail.

North end at 37.812129°S 145.218121°E. South end at 37.999997°S 145.194264°E.
