= Tarralla Creek Trail =

Path for cyclists and pedestrians

- Length: 5.63km
- Location: Melbourne, Victoria, Australia
- Difficulty: Easy
- Hills: None
- Train: Croydon station
- Tram: None

The Tarralla Creek Trail is a shared use path for cyclists and pedestrians, which follows Tarralla Creek (previously known as the Croydon main drain), in the outer eastern suburb of Croydon in Melbourne, Victoria, Australia. It is part of the Carrum to Warburton trail and Bayswater to Lilydale link.

== Following the path ==
Heading east on the Dandenong Creek Trail, the Dandenong Creek Trail goes under the Belgrave railway line. On the east side of the underpass the Belgrave Rail Trail immediately heads off parallel to the rail line to the right (south). 70m later, along the Dandenong Creek Trail, is a footbridge to the left (north) that crosses Dandenong Creek. This is the beginning of the southern end of the Tarralla Creek Trail. This area is effectively a major intersection for trails and is unsigned - see confusing intersections.

Cross the footbridge and continue north up Bungalook Rd E to Canterbury Rd. Turn left (NW) and go past the Bayswater Golf Driving Range on the left. Cross Canterbury Rd at the pedestrian crossing and pick up the trail on the far side just north of Greenhill Rd.

Continue along the trail for about 1.9 km to the footbridge at Oak Lane. Head up Oak lane (east) to Bayswater Rd. Turn left (north) and cross the road at the pedestrian crossing. 300m from Oak Lane the trail ducks through to Yvonne St. At the end of Yvonne St and on the far side of at Eastfield Rd the trail restarts. About 2 km later, after passing by the Fred Geale oval, it comes to an end at Norton Rd next to Swinburne Tech - Croydon campus.

== Connections ==
Dead end in the north east at Norton Rd. Meets the Dandenong Creek Trail and the Belgrave Rail Trail in the south west. A 2.7 km road section, via Croydon station and a fairly steep hill, can be used to reach the upper Mullum Mullum Creek Trail.

North end at 37.800938°S 145.285058°E. South end at 37.836690°S 145.264179°E.
