= Hallam Bypass Trail =

Shared use path in Melbourne, Australia

- Length: 13.7 km
- Location: Melbourne, Victoria, Australia
- Difficulty: Easy
- Surface: Concrete and bitumen path
- Hills: Some undulations
- Train: Dandenong
- Tram: None

The Hallam Bypass Trail is a shared use path for cyclists and pedestrians running along the Hallam Bypass between Doveton and Berwick in the outer eastern suburbs of Melbourne, Victoria, Australia. The trail was completed in 2003.

== Route ==
To follow the Hallam Bypass Trail, leave the Dandenong Creek Trail just east of Dandenong central business district and travel down the signed route along McCrae Street, Box Street, Grevillia Street and Wattle Drive. Then enter and follow the reserves that span Eumemmerring Creek.

The trail proper passes under the South Gippsland Highway and runs parallel to the Hallam Bypass. At the Gunns Road Reserve the trail splits to the north and south. To continue on the trail follow the path to the south and cross the wooden boardwalk. The northern path leads uphill to a footbridge over the Hallam Bypass and connects into the local road network of Endeavour Hills and another shared pathway leading to Endeavour Hills Shopping Centre.

From Gunns Road Reserve the trail continues east to the Westfield Fountain Gate shopping centre. Here the trail passes under the Hallam Bypass to the north side of Westfield Fountain Gate where it crosses a carved wooden footbridge. From the wooden footbridge a short 1.5 kilometre path leaves the trail for Parkhill Junction Plaza and Ernst Wanke Road.

The bypass trail continues parallel to the bypass until reaching the Princes Highway where it departs the bypass to follow the highway. From here the trail passes by Wilson Botanic Park and a small stand of pine trees before reaching its terminus at Lyall Road, near the Berwick Village main street.

== Connections ==
The trail connects to the Dandenong Creek Trail in the west and terminates at Lyall Road in the east.

Traveling 1.5 kilometres north along Lyall Road and Harkaway Road, a trail running alongside Ernst Wanke Road is encountered. It heads west and 2 kilometres later, it makes a small diversion up some side streets and arrives at Parkhill Junction Plaza back on Ernst Wanke Road. The trail splits in two here but not obviously. One trail (1.5 kilometres) leads to the Hallam Bypass trail at Westfield Fountain Gate. The Ernst Wanke Road trail continues onwards and intersects the Hallam Bypass trail after 4.8 kilometres.

The south end of the Birds Land Reserve to Lysterfield Park Trail starts at the very south end of Lysterfield Park, just 4.5 kilometres by quiet roads from the Hallam Bypass Trail. Leave the Hallam Bypass Trail using the freeway underpass 400 meters west of Ernst Wanke Road. Follow the shared path, than travel along Drysdale Road and Heathdale Road. At the small roundabout turn left (north) up Glenwood Road. Cross Belgrave-Hallam Road and continue north up Jacques Rd. Turn left (west) at Heatherton Road and then right (north) up Reservoir Road.

West end at 37.998068°S 145.221220°E. East end at 38.030658°S 145.343997°E.
