= Bay Trail (Australia) =

Shared use path in Melbourne, Australia

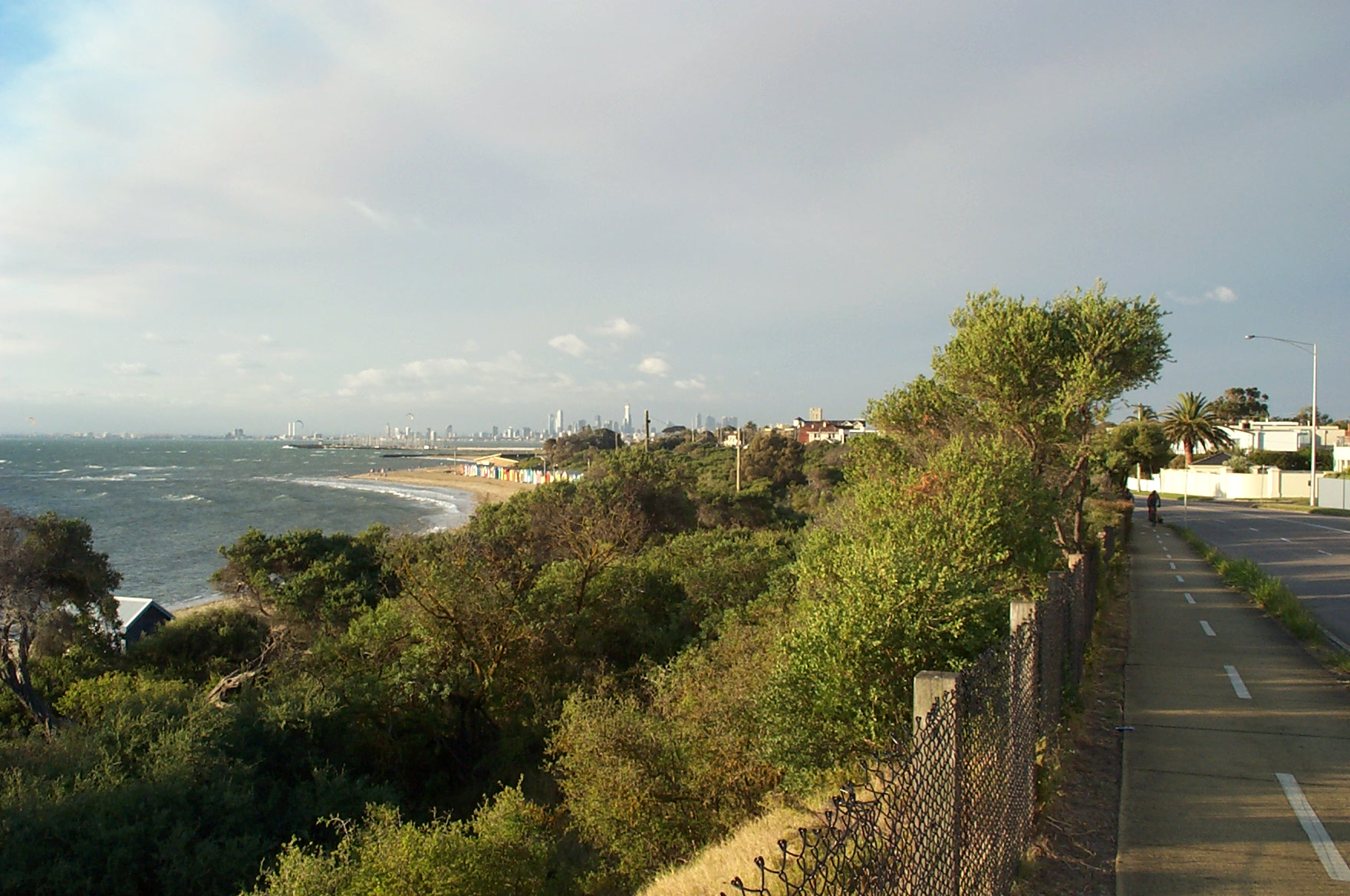
- Part of the Bay Trail in Brighton
- Length: Approx. 49.8 km from the Yarra River, Port Melbourne to Seaford
- Location: Melbourne, Victoria, Australia
- Difficulty: Easy
- Hazards: Car park entrances/exits between Mentone and St Kilda; Heavy pedestrian traffic between Brighton and Port Melbourne, particularly during warmer months; Missing section of trail between Cromer Road and Charman Road, Beaumaris
- Surface: Concrete & bitumen north of Mordialloc, gravel south.
- Hills: Minor hills between Mentone and St Kilda
- Water: Water fountains at several stages between Mordialloc and Port Melbourne
- Trains: Frankston line (Carrum), Sandringham (Sandringham)

The Bay Trail is a shared use path for cyclists and pedestrians which follows the coastline of Port Phillip Bay through the south-eastern suburbs of Melbourne, Victoria, Australia.

The trail begins at Austin Road, Seaford near the Edithvale-Seaford Wetlands viewing platform and travels north. The trail ends just north of the West Gate Bridge in Port Melbourne. On weekends, a punt ferries pedestrians and bicycles across the Yarra River to Spotswood in the city's west.

North of Brighton, the path is split into separate facilities for pedestrians and cyclists, which are also popular with inline skaters.

While the path is not well signed in the Seaford to Mentone Life Saving Club section, signage becomes more prominent from there to the city, making it easy to navigate the route.

== Following the path ==
- In the south, the trail begins a short distance from Seaford railway station on the corner of Austin Road and Erwin Drive.
- Following the path, head north on the west side of the Seaford Wetlands.
- The trail appears to end at Armstrongs Road in Seaford, however it continues at the end of Wilson Grove; the first street to the right.
- At Seaford North Primary School, take the right path through the woodlands.
- The path runs parallel to the Eel Race Drain next to Patterson River Secondary College. Take the footbridge over the Eel Race Drain.
- Once across the footbridge, turn right along the gravel path that runs next to Emma Street. The path goes in between the backs of the houses.
- Take the left path to travel through Roy Dore Reserve in Carrum. You may have to ride along Dyson Road past the kindergarten because there is no path. When the street turns to go left, turn right along the path that heads north through the houses towards the Patterson River.
- A set of pedestrian lights has been installed on busy McLeod Road, Carrum, opposite McDougall Reserve. On the northern side of the crossing is Launching Way, where the trail continues towards the Patterson River boat launching ramps. Turn left onto the Danadenong Creek Trail/Bay Trail; where the trail then heads south-west for a short distance (0.5 km) towards the bay.
- Just before the Nepean Highway/Frankston Train Line overpass, ride up to the new Station Street bridge and cross the Patterson River, heading back down onto the northern embankment. Head north-east inland for approximately 2 km along the Patterson River track.
- After 2 km, merge left down an embankment onto the Long Beach/Bay Trail now heading north-west towards Mordialloc.
- Travel through Bicentennial Park, past the Netball Courts and to the set of traffic lights on Thames Promenade. Cross Thames Promenade and continue down the track.
- Cross Edithvale Road at the lights and head past the Edithvale Recreation Reserve, still heading north.
- Stay on the gravel path, going past Browns Reserve and Mordialloc College.
- The trail then goes under the railway bridge at Mordialloc. Ride through the carpark, then merge onto the Nepean Highway footpath.
- Straight after crossing the Mordialloc Creek, take a sharp right and travel through the underpass at Nepean Highway. Follow the trail towards the Pier, taking the right path before the Tour De Cafe.
- Follow the path to the beach, and from Mordialloc onward, the trail now runs along the coast between the sand and Beach Road. Take the concrete path along the foreshore through the Mordialloc Beach, and then take the gravel section of the trail between Mordialloc and Parkdale, running between the sand dunes.
- At the Parkdale Beach Cafe and Kiosk, walkers can take the concrete path down to the shore and follow that to the Mentone Life Saving Club, but cyclists should use shared path on Beach Road after the Parkdale Yacht Club.
- From Mentone Life Saving Club onward, the trail is concrete, with a dashed line in the centre.
- From here, navigation is fairly self-explanatory. The trail heads north-west towards Port Melbourne, passing through the suburbs of Black Rock, Sandringham, Hampton, Brighton, Elwood, St Kilda, Middle Park, and Albert Park.
- The trail ends at Sandridge Life Saving Club, near the mouth of the Yarra River.

== Landmarks ==
- Port Phillip Bay
- Patterson River
- Edithvale-Seaford Wetlands
- Mordialloc Creek
- Ricketts Point Tea House
- Half Moon Bay
- Wreck of HMAS Cerberus
- Sandringham Harbour
- Elwood Canal & Elster Creek
- St Kilda Marina
- Station Pier
- Westgate Park
- West Gate Bridge

== Connections ==
Cyclists from the western suburbs can access the northern end of the trail using the West Gate Punt when it is in service. Access from the Melbourne city centre is via the Sandridge Trail. In the south, there are numerous connections to other paths including the Mordialloc Creek Trail and Braeside Park. At Patterson River, the trail meets the Dandenong Creek Trail (Ride on the southern embankment under neath Wells Road and the Mornington Peninsula Freeway, which in turn connects to the EastLink Trail. The most southerly point is in Seaford at the southern end of the Seaford Swamp near Austin Rd. Users can continue inland along a footpath which connects to the Peninsula Link Trail.

A path runs along Elwood Canal / Elster Creek, ending near Gardenvale Station

North end at 37.829302°S 144.900715°E. South end at 38.105002°S 145.135552°E.

== See also ==
- Hobsons Bay Coastal Trail
