= Dandenong Creek =

Urban creek in Melbourne, Australia

Dandenong Dand-y-non, Tanjenong
- Dandenong Creek as a canalized urban stream in Dandenong Park, Dandenong

- Location of the Dandenong Creek mouth in Victoria
- Etymology: Aboriginal Bunwurrung: "high" or "lofty"
- Native name: Narra Narrawong, Dandinnong

Location
- Country: Australia
- State: Victoria
- Region: South East Coastal Plain (IBRA), Greater Melbourne
- Local government area: City of Monash

Physical characteristics
- Source: Dandenong Ranges
- 2nd source: Bungalook Creek
  - location: near Heathmont
  - coordinates: 37°50′8″S 145°15′25″E
  - elevation: 556 m (1,824 ft)
- Mouth: confluence with the Eumemmerring Creek to form the Patterson River
  - location: southwest of Bangholme
  - coordinates: 38°02′30″S 145°10′34″E
  - elevation: 6 m (20 ft)
- Length: 53 km (33 mi)

Basin features
- River system: Port Phillip catchment

The Dandenong Creek (Aboriginal Bunwurrung: Narra Narrawong or Dandinnong) is an urban creek of the Port Phillip catchment, in the eastern and south-eastern Greater Melbourne region of the Australian east coast state of Victoria. Its headwaters are in the Dandenong Ranges near Olinda, sourced by a series of springs and small runoff streams within the Dandenong Ranges National Park.

The creek descends approximately 550 metres (1,800 ft) over its course of 53 kilometres (33 mi) before joining the Eumemmerring Creek to form the Patterson River (of which it can be considered the de facto main stem) and eventually draining into the Beaumaris Bay. Together with its distributary Mordialloc Creek and the culvert-linked Kananook Creek and Elster Creek, the so-called "Dandenong Catchment" has an overall catchment of approximately 882 km^{2} (341 sq mi).

== History ==
The traditional custodians of the land surrounding what is now known as the Dandenong Creek were the indigenous Bunurong people of the Kulin nation who referred to the creek as Narra Narrawong; while others gave the creek the name Dandenong, sometimes spelled as Dand-y-non or Tanjenong by early settlers, believed to mean "high" or "lofty". The first European to see the creek near its source was in 1839 and is believed to be Daniel Bunce, a botanist.

== Ecology ==
The series of open space reserves along the Dandenong Creek and its tributaries provide important habitat for many urban wildlife in the outer eastern/southeastern suburbs. The creek is also the home of one of the largest remaining populations of Yarra Gum, and a series of linear parks, nature reserves and wetlands are located along it. A bike path known as the Dandenong Creek Trail runs alongside for a significant distance.

The Dandenong Creek catchment is the westernmost native range of eastern dwarf galaxias (Galaxiella pusilla), which is endangered due to habitat loss, riparian degradation, the extirpation of commensal Geocharax crayfish (whose burrows are utilized by G. pusilla for aestivation during drought), and predation/competition from invasive species such as the redfin perch, brown trout and eastern mosquitofish (which both feeds on eggs of G. pusilla and territorially attacks them via fin-nipping).

The health of the creek in these urban areas ranges from moderate to very poor and has been the focus of a number of clean-up campaigns in recent years. An industrial wastewater stream known as Old Joes Creek flows into Dandenong Creek, with its confluence in Bayswater. This drain runs underground for much of its course, running in a westerly direction and servicing several industrial estates in the catchment of Dandenong Creek. The tributary is commonly contaminated with plastic litterings and heavy metals, and authorities have made several attempts to prevent pollution which spreads downstream into Dandenong Creek.

== Upper Dandenong Creek ==
The Upper Dandenong starts at the Olinda town center and first flows westwards between Mount Dandenong and The Basin, picking up its first significant tributary, the Dobson Creek, near a retarding basin just west of the junction among The Basin, Kilsyth, Kilsyth South and Boronia. It continues further west as the boundary between several adjacent suburbs, picking up Little Bungalook and Tarralla-Bungalook Creek before turning southwards at the junction between Ringwood, Vermont and Wantirna, roughly where EastLink crosses.

=== Tributaries ===
- Dobsons Creek (left) — headwaters in Sassafras, confluence in northern The Basin (near Liverpool Road Retarding Basin)
- Old Joes Creek (left) — headwaters in The Basin, confluence in Bayswater (near Marie Wallace Park) (Note: Old Joes Creek (No. 5320) is a minor tributary of Dandenong Creek. The name refers to Joseph Gadd who lived with his family on Old Joes Creek. It begins as an open watercourse in the Dandenong Ranges National Park, in the northwestern fringes of Tremont, and continues in underground pipes below The Basin and Boronia before coming out at the Old Joes Creek Retarding Basin. From here, it flows underground below an industrial area in Bayswater before reaching Marie Wallace Park, where it joins Dandenong Creek.)
- Bungalook Creek (right) — headwaters in Montrose, confluence in Heathmont (near HE Parker Reserve)
  - Tarralla Creek / Kilsyth Main Drain
    - Croydon Main Drain
    - Kilsyth West Drain
  - Little Bungalook Creek
- Stud Road North Drain (left) – headwaters in Bayswater, confluence in Bayswater
- Wantirna South Drain (left) – headwaters in Wantirna, confluence in Wantirna (at JW Manson Reserve)
- Ringwood South Drain (right) – headwaters in Ringwood, confluence in Ringwood (near Mint Street Wetlands)

== Middle Dandenong Creek ==
The Middle Dandenong starts at the mouth of the small Heatherdale Creek just west of EastLink, and then flows meanderingly to the south, joined by the Blind Creek (near Jells Park). It then crosses over to the east side of the EastLink, joined by the Corhanwarrabul Creek (at the Tirhatuan Wetlands), and then courses southeast towards the western edge of the Churchill National Park, crossing the namesaked Dandenong Valley Highway (Stud Road) in the process. After draining a series of greenspace reserves known as the Dandenong Valley Parklands, the creek reaches the Dandenong Police Paddocks Reserve, in Endeavour Hills and turns more southwardly again as the boundary between Dandenong North and Endeavour Hills. The riparian zones, retention ponds and retarding grasslands in associated runoff catchment surrounding the tri-suburban junction between Dandenong North, Dandenong and Doveton are known as the Dandenong Wetlands, which include a 0.8 km (0.5 mi) section of Heatherton Road just west of Monash Freeway that functions as a floodway. The creek then continues further south as the northern half of the boundary between Dandenong and Doveton.

=== Tributaries ===
- Heatherdale Creek (right bank) — headwaters in southwestern Ringwood, confluence in eastern Vermont (Note: Heatherdale Creek (Drain No. 5230) is a minor tributary of Dandenong Creek. It has several tributaries of its own, which collect urban runoff from northeastern Vermont, southwestern Ringwood and southeastern Mitcham. It flows mostly underground, emerging briefly at the Heatherdale Retarding Basin before continuing below Heatherdale Road and exiting just north of Canterbury Road. It then travels in a concrete channel near the Heatherdale Wetlands before it joining Dandenong Creek.)
  - Purches Street Drain
  - Palmerston Road Drain
- Vermont East Drain (right bank) – headwaters in northeastern Vermont Sth, confluence in northeastern Vermont Sth (Note: The Vermont East Drain (No. 5237) is a minor tributary of Dandenong Creek. It has no major tributaries, and its catchment area is only 390,000m². It was proclaimed an arterial drain by the Dandenong Valley Authority in February 1973 and subsequently diverted underground as part of the Vermont East Drainage Scheme. The Dandenong Valley Authority, City of Whitehorse and private developers Stocks & Holdings, Hanover Holdings and Lend Lease were among the main financial contributors of the scheme. Its headwaters is located in the vicinity of Danielle Court.)
- Koomba Road Drain (left bank) – headwaters in Wantirna, confluence in Wantirna South
- Vermont South Drain (right bank) – headwaters in southwestern Vermont and eastern Forest Hill, confluence in Vermont Sth (Note: The Vermont South Drain (No. 5240) is a minor tributary of Dandenong Creek. It was gazetted in 1970 and hastily diverted underground as part of the Vermont South Drainage Scheme, which rectified flooding caused by new housing projects in the area. It formally begins at the Healesville Freeway Reserve in Vermont, intaking flow from the Bellara Street Drain (No. 5246) before continuing below Felgate Parade to the Bellbird Dell Reserve, where it is joined by the Vermont Drain (No. 5244). It then runs below Terrara Park and Great Western Drive before joining the Burwood Highway Drain (No. 5241), joining Dandenong Creek just north of Burwood Highway.)
  - Burwood Highway Drain
  - Vermont Drain
    - Martins Drain
    - Bagleys Lane Drain
    - Nurlendi Road Drain
  - Bellara Street Drain
- Burwood South Drain (right bank) – headwaters in southern Vermont South, confluence in southeastern Vermont South (Note: The Burwood South Drain (No. 5236) and its three proclaimed tributaries (the Weeden Drive, Highbury Road, and Lascelles Drive Drains) were diverted undergroundground during the 1970s to alleviate flooding of the emerging residential areas. The outlet to Dandenong Creek is located in the Bushy Park Wetlands.)
  - Weeden Drive Drain
  - Highbury Road Drain
    - Lascelles Drive Drain
- Nunawading Outfall Drain (right bank) – headwaters in Forest Hill, confluence in Glen Waverley (Note: The Nunawading Outfall Drain (No. 5211) was proclaimed in 1970. Its largest tributary is the East Burwood Drain (No. 5214), which begins near the Healesville Freeway Reserve in Forest Hill and continues below Stanley Road to Dalroy Crescent Reserve, where it is joined by the Channel 0 Drain. It then continues below Vermont South and Glen Waverley, and the Camelot Drive Drain (No.5213) joins it below Capital Reserve. It is joined just downstream by the Larpent Street Drain (No. 5212), after which it becomes the Nunawading Outfall Drain. This is then briefly joined by the Gallaghers Road Drain (No. 5211) and the Excalibur Avenue Drain (No.5216) before reaching Dandenong Creek at Shepherds Bush.)
  - Gallaghers Road Drain
  - Excalibur Avenue Drain
  - Larpent Street Drain
  - East Burwood Drain
    - Camelot Drive Drain
    - Channel '0' Drain
- Lum Road Drain (right bank) – headwaters in Wheelers Hill, confluence in Wheelers Hill
- Blind Creek (left bank) – headwaters in Dandenong Ranges National Park, confluence in northwestern Scoresby (at Jells Park)
  - Wantirna South Drain
    - Templeton Street Drain
    - Coppelia Street Drain
    - George Street Drain
    - Cathies Lanes Drain
    - Templeton Street Drain
    - Studfield West Drain
    - Riddle Road Drain
    - Pentlowe Road Drain
    - Boronia Main Drain
    - Forest Road Drain
- Petronella Avenue Drain (right bank) – headwaters and confluence in Wheelers Hill
- The Devitation Drain (right bank) – headwaters and confluence in Wheelers Hill
- Scoresby Outfall Drain (left bank) – headwaters and confluence in Scoresby
- Jells Road South Drain (right bank) – headwaters in Wheelers Hill, and confluence in Wheelers Hill
- Jacksons Road Drain (right bank) – headwaters in Mulgrave, confluence in Mulgrave
- Police Road Drain (right bank) – headwaters in Mulgrave, confluence in Mulgrave
- Corhanwarrabul Creek (left bank) — headwaters in southern Ferny Creek, confluence in Rowville (at Police Road Retarding Basin)
  - Rowville Main Drain
  - Kellets Road Drain
  - Knoxfield Outfall Drain
    - Ferntree Gully Road Drain
    - Kent Park Drain
  - Ferny Creek
    - Windermere Drain
    - Ferntree Gully South Drain
    - Station Street Drain
    - Ferntree Gully Creek
      - Upwey Creek
    - Mast Gully Creek
    - Lysterfield West Drain
  - Monbulk Creek
    - Clematis Creek
      - Pound Creek
      - Sherbrooke Creek
    - Hardys Creek
- Exells Drain (right) – headwaters in Dandenong North, confluence in Dandenong North (at Tirhatuan Park)
- Essex Park Drain (left) – headwaters in Endeavour Hills, confluence in Endeavour Hills (at Dandenong Wetlands)
- Heatherton Road Drain (left) – headwaters in Endeavour Hills, confluence in Doveton (at Myuna Wetlands)

== Lower Dandenong Dreek ==
The Lower Dandenong starts just upstream of the Clow Street bridge in Dandenong East, where the creek becomes concrete-lined throughout almost its entire course within Dandenong. It first turns southwest at Dandenong Park, looping shortly northwest before crossing Princes Highway and the Pakenham/Cranbourne railway line, then continues further westwards south of the Dandenong town center until it picks up the Mile Creek (its last de jure tributary) about 350 m (380 yd) upstream of the Dandenong Bypass bridge.

It then turns straight south again and courses alongside the EastLink's east side as the boundary between Dandenong South and Keysborough, crossing over to the west side of the EastLink again about 1 km (0.62 mi) before giving off Mordialloc Creek near the tri-suburban junction with Bangholme at the Perry Road bridge. It then flows southwest into Bangholme for another 1.4 km (0.87 mi) before reaching its confluence with the Eumemmerring Creek to form the partly man-made Patterson River, which continues southwest through Bangholme, Patterson Lakes, Bonbeach and Carrum and drains into the Beaumaris Bay, a small eastern bight of Port Phillip Bay north of the Mornington Peninsula.

=== Tributaries ===
- Dandenong Main Drain (right) – headwaters in Dandenong, confluence in Dandenong (at Dandenong Park)
- Allan Street Street Drain (right) – headwaters in Dandenong, confluence in Dandenong (at Keneally Street)
- Mile Creek (left) – headwaters in Springvale, Clayton, Notting Hill and Mulgrave, confluence between Dandenong and Keysborough
  - Yarraman Creek (left) – headwaters in Noble Park North, confluence in Dandenong (near Yarraman railway station)
  - Springvale Cemetery Drain (left) – headwaters in Mulgrave, confluence in Springvale (at Sandown Park)
  - Mile Creek East Branch (left) – headwaters in Mulgrave, confluence in Springvale (near Hope Reserve)
  - Mile Creek North Branch (left) – headwaters in Glen Waverley, confluence in Clayton (near Ebony Close)
    - Monash University Drain (right) – headwaters in Clayton, confluence in Clayton (near Australian Synchrotron)
- Greens Road Drain (left) – headwaters in Dandenong South, confluence in Dandenong South (at Wayan Park)
- Ordish Road Drain (left) – headwaters in Dandenong South, confluence in Dandenong South
- Ordish Road North Drain (left) – headwaters in Dandenong South, confluence in Dandenong South
- Perry Road Drain (right) – headwaters in Keysborough, confluence in Keysborough (near GAA Gaelic Park)
- Eumemmerring Creek (left) — headwaters in western Belgrave South, confluence at Bangholme to form the Patterson River
  - Bangholme Road Drain (right) – headwaters in Dandenong South, confluence in Dandenong South
  - Hammond Road Drain (right) – headwaters in Dandenong South, confluence in Dandenong South
  - Dandenong South Drain (right) – headwaters in Dandenong South, confluence in Dandenong South
  - Greens Lane Drain (right) – headwaters in Dandenong, confluence in Dandenong South
  - Abbotts Road Drain (left) – headwaters in Dandenong South, confluence in Dandenong South
  - Greens Lane East Drain (right) – headwaters in Dandenong South, confluence in Dandenong South
  - Hallam Main Drain (left) – headwaters in Berwick, confluence in Hallam
    - Hallam South Drain (right) – network of sevearl creeks, headwaters in Hallam, confluence in Hallam
    - Troups Creek (right) – headwaters in Narre Warren North, confluence in Narre Warren
      - Troups Creek East Branch (left) – headwaters in Harkaway, confluence in Narre Warren
    - Berwick Township Drain (left) – headwaters in Berwick, confluence in Narre Warren
    - Berwick South Drain (right) – headwaters in Berwick South, confluence in Narre Warren

=== Distributary ===
- Mordialloc Creek – branching off the right bank of Dandenong Creek at the tri-suburban junction of Keysborough, Bangholme and Dandenong South (near Perry Road bridge), flowing west/northwest as the boundary between Keysborough, Bangholme, Waterways, Braeside and Aspendale Gardens, picking up the drainage runoff from the Smythes Drain, Waterways Lake and Lagoons, Dunlops Drain (formed from Old Dandenong Road Drain and Dingley Drain), Mordialloc Settlement Drain, Heatherton Drain and the Edithvale Wetlands Drain before emptying into Beaumaris Bay between Mordialloc and Aspendale.

== Creek crossings ==
The list below notes current bridges that cross over the Dandenong Creek. Some are road and rail bridges, whilst others are pedestrian and equestrian crossings.

=== Patterson River to Dandenong Valley Parklands ===
Crossing	Image	Coordinates	Built	Suburb	Description
Old Perry Road				Bangholme	Ruins of old Perry Road bridge over Dandenong Creek
Perry Road				Bangholme	
EastLink			2008	Dandenong South	
Greens Road				Dandenong South	
Unnamed creek crossing				Dandenong South	Abandoned concrete-paved ford crossing
Dandenong Bypass			2008	Dandenong South	
EastLink Trail			2008	Dandenong	Low-water bridge
Allan Street				Dandenong	
Hammond Road				Dandenong	Has a closely adjacent pedestrian footbridge downstream of the main bridge
Gippsland Railway bridge				Dandenong	Railway bridge carrying the Gippsland line
Lonsdale Street pedestrian bridge				Dandenong	Beam footbridge parallel to Lonsdale Street
Lonsdale Street				Dandenong	The crossing of the Princes Highway, locally named Lonsdale Street
Dandenong Creek Trail				Dandenong	Through arch footbridge
Dandenong Park footbridge				Dandenong	
McCrae Street				Dandenong	
Dandenong Workers Social Club footbridge				Dandenong	Footbridge between the Dandenong Workers Social Club and their golf course across the creek
Kidds Road					
Heatherton Road				Dandenong North	The westbound lanes being a de facto low-water bridge during flood seasons, section west of the creek also serves as floodway
Monash Freeway				Dandenong North	
Brady Road				Dandenong North	
Stud Road				Dandenong North	
Police Road Retarding Basin				Mulgrave	Causeway atop the basin embankment and spillway, enabling pedestrian crossing
EastLink			2008	Mulgrave	
Wellington Road				Rowville	

=== Dandenong Valley Parklands ===
Crossing	Image	Coordinates	Built	Suburb	Description
Dandenong Valley wetland trail			2010	Scoresby	Shared path over the creek
Ferntree Gully Road				Scoresby	
EastLink Trail			2008	Scoresby	
Dandenong Creek Trail				Scoresby	
Patterson's Bridge				Wantirna South	Part of Dandenong Creek Trail
High Street Road footbridge				Wantirna South	Footbridge linking Napier Park with Nortons Park
High Street				Wantirna South	
Burwood Highway				Vermont South	
Dandenong Creek Trail				Vermont South	Koomba Park boardwalk

=== Dandenong Valley Parklands to Mount Dandenong ===
Crossing	Image	Coordinates	Built	Suburb	Description
Boronia Road				Vermont	
EastLink Trail				Vermont	Section of the EastLink Trail linking Winton Wetlands with Campbells Croft Reserve
EastLink			2008	Ringwood	
Wantirna Road				Ringwood	
Marlborough Road footbridge				Heathmont	Footbridge at the end of Marlborough Road
H.E. Parker Reserve footbridge				Heathmont	Footbridge connecting the Dandenong Creek Trail with H.E. Parker Reserve
Belgrave railway line				Bayswater North	
Tarralla Creek Trail				Bayswater North	
Bayswater Road				Bayswater North	
Dorset Road				Bayswater North	
Colchester Road				Kilsyth South	
Liverpool Road Retarding Basin wall				Boronia	Path along basin wall provides crossing over the creek
Liverpool Road Retarding Basin footbridge				Boronia	Footbridge inside the retarding basin provides crossing over the creek
Liverpool Road				The Basin	
Dobson Lane				The Basin	Dobson Lane
Pavitt Lane				Kilsyth	
Sheffield Road				Kilsyth	
Edgar Track				Mount Dandenong	
Doongalla Forest access road				Mount Dandenong	
Dandenong Creek Track				Olinda	

== See also ==
- List of rivers of Australia § Victoria
