= Jells Park =

Public park in Melbourne, Victoria, Australia

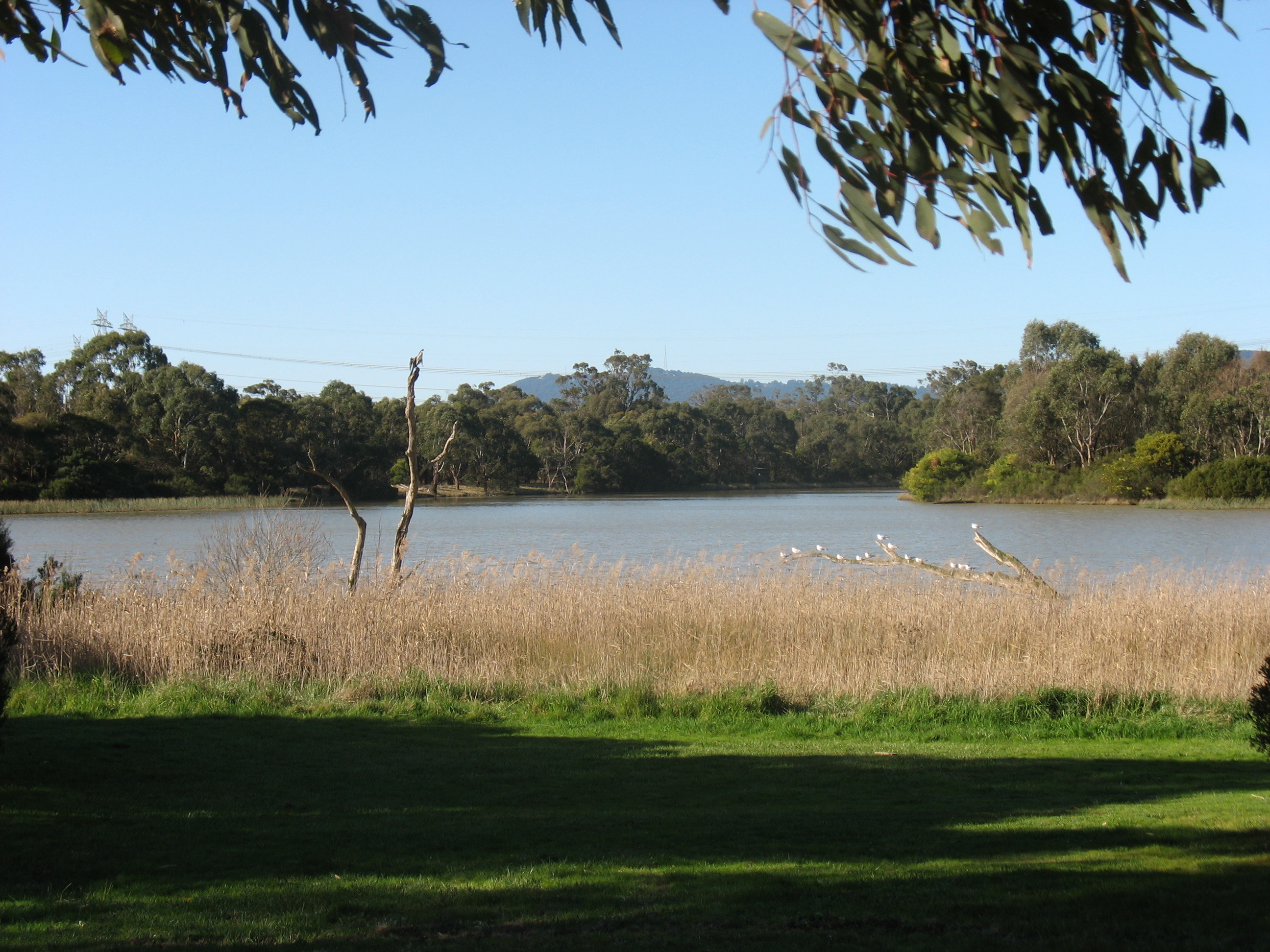
- Jells Lake, in the centre of the park

- Location within Melbourne
- Interactive map of Jells Park
- Type: Metropolitan park
- Location: Wheelers Hill, Melbourne, Victoria, Australia
- Coordinates: 37°53′56″S 145°12′05″E
- Area: 127 ha (310 acres)
- Opened: April 1976; 50 years ago
- Etymology: Joseph Jell
- Operator: Parks Victoria
- Visitors: 1,000,000 (in 2024)
- Status: Open all year
- Paths: 9 km (5.6 mi) sealed and unsealed
- Terrain: Flat; riverbank
- Habitats: Swampy woodland; swampy riparian woodland
- Water: Dandenong Creek
- Public transit: – Scotchmans Creek Trail, EastLink Trail, Dandenong Creek Trail
- Facilities: Barbecues; disabled access; parking; playgrounds; picnic shelters; toilet; visitor centre
- Website: parks.vic.gov.au

Jells Park is a 127-hectare (314-acre) metropolitan park in Wheelers Hill, a southeastern suburb of Melbourne, in Victoria, Australia. Opened in April 1976, the park is named after Joseph Jell, a cattle grazier who worked in the area in the mid-to-late 19th century. Located on the western bank of the Dandenong Creek, the park contains 9 kilometres (5.6 mi) of paths for cycling and walking, including Scotchmans Creek Trail, EastLink Trail, and Dandenong Creek Trail which connects to Blind Creek Trail.

Situated on the traditional land of the Wurundjeri Woi-wurrung, Jells Park is managed by Parks Victoria as part of the Dandenong Valley Parklands, a collection of public parks and open space reserves along the Dandenong Creek. The park attracts about one million visitors a year.

== Ecology ==
Whilst a significant part of Jells Park has been cleared and revegetated, its biodiversity is still significant, forming part of the Dandenong Creek wildlife corridor. Under the ecological vegetation class system, it is predominantly swampy woodland and swampy riparian woodland.

The park is home to the man-made Jells Lake, with two jetties where recreational fishing is a popular activity. European carp are present in large numbers in the wetland and have become a significant concern for its biodiversity. The lake is abutted by a grassed picnic area on the northwest, whilst an area of remnant bush surrounds the rest of the lake. This bush also contains a bird hide which can be used to spot a variety of native bird species such as Australasian swamphens, pelicans, Eurasian coots, dusky moorhens, and several species of ducks.

== Paths ==
Jells Park contains an extensive network of shared use paths for cycling, walking, and running. The Dandenong Creek Trail runs north–south through the park. Scotchmans Creek Trail also runs through the park from the west, connecting with Dandenong Creek Trail in the south east corner. EastLink Trail skirts the southern edge of the park. A little further north of the park, the Blind Creek Trail comes in from the east and also terminates at the Dandenong Creek Trail.

The Conservation Trail follows the eastern side of the lake past billabongs and wetlands. The bird hide is accessible from this path.

Most trails through the park are paved but some are firm gravel. Paths are generally well signposted and suitable for prams. Dogs are permitted on-lead in much of the park, except for the areas of remnant bushland where they are prohibited.

== Facilities ==
There is a visitor centre in the north west of the park which is run by Parks Victoria and incorporates a cafe and toilet block.

Two ovals in the south of the park are frequently used for sporting activities and are open for public access at other times.

The park is popular for picnics and barbecues, with playgrounds at Yabby Hill. In late 2018, the remaining wood-burning barbecues were removed in favour of the newer gas ones, leaving eight gas barbecues remaining. The park incorporates the following picnic areas:

	Picnic shelter	Barbecues	Carparking	Disabled access	Toilets	Information	Notes
Pines Picnic Area	Yes	Yes	Yes	No	Yes	No	Playground
Stringybark Picnic Area	Yes	Yes	Yes	No	No	No	
Elms Picnic Area	No	No	No	No	No	No	Grassed area
Jells East Picnic Area	No	No	No	Yes	Yes	No	
Oaks Picnic Area	Yes	Yes	Yes	Yes	Yes	No	Playground
Ashes Picnic Area	Yes	Yes	Yes	Yes	No	Yes	

== History ==
Thomas Napier leased land on the west bank of the Dandenong Creek in 1839, which later formed part of the Bushy Park pastoral run. Joseph Jell settled the land that became the park in the 1840s and gained a pre-emptive right to it in the 1850s; his homestead probably stood between the present visitor centre and the Elms picnic area. The area was farmed, chiefly for grazing. The site was used as a piggery from the late 1930s to the 1960s, and as a United States Army storage depot during the Second World War. Jells Park opened to the public in April 1976.

== Gallery ==
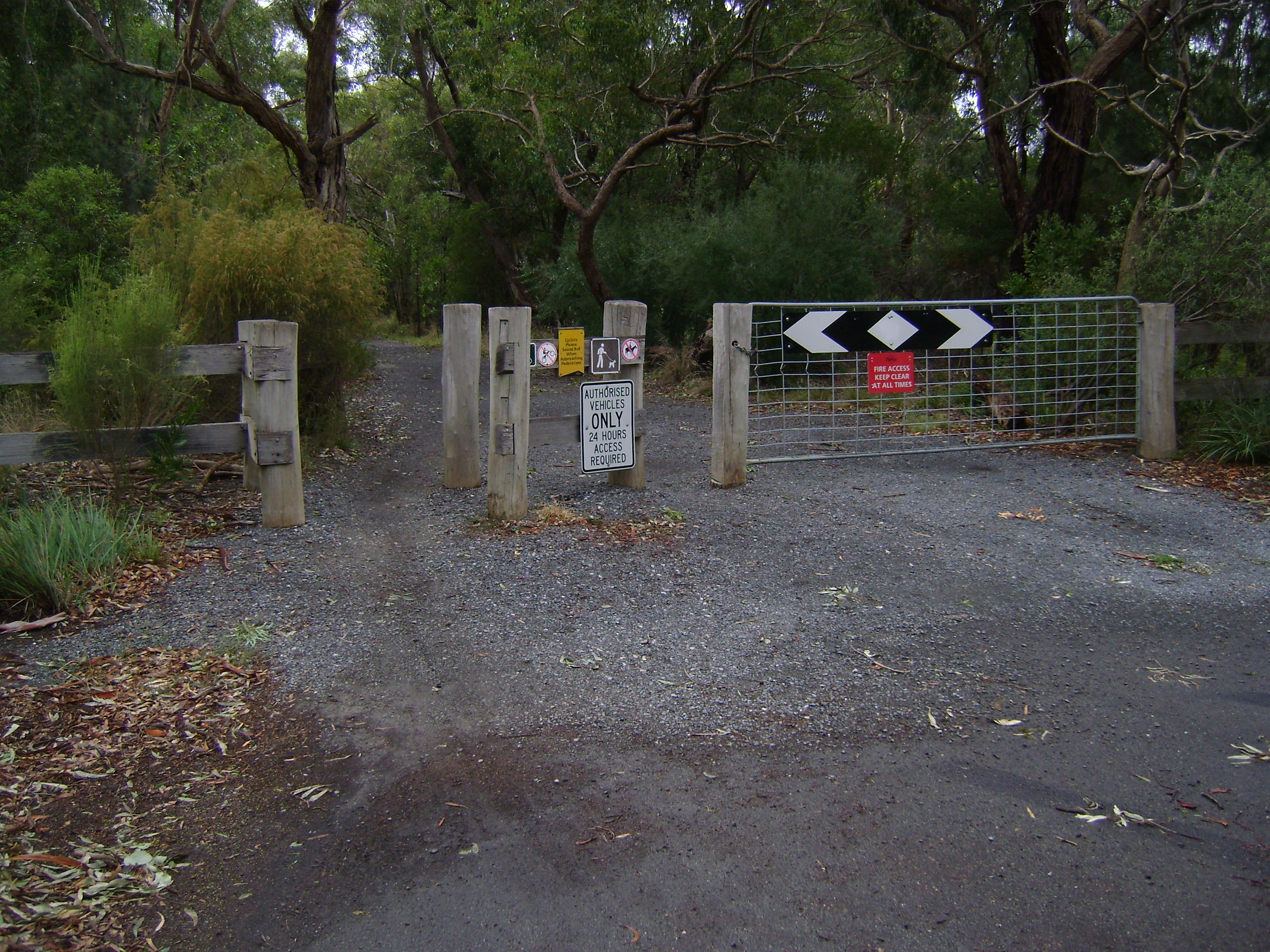
Entrance to Jells Park from Shepherds Lane

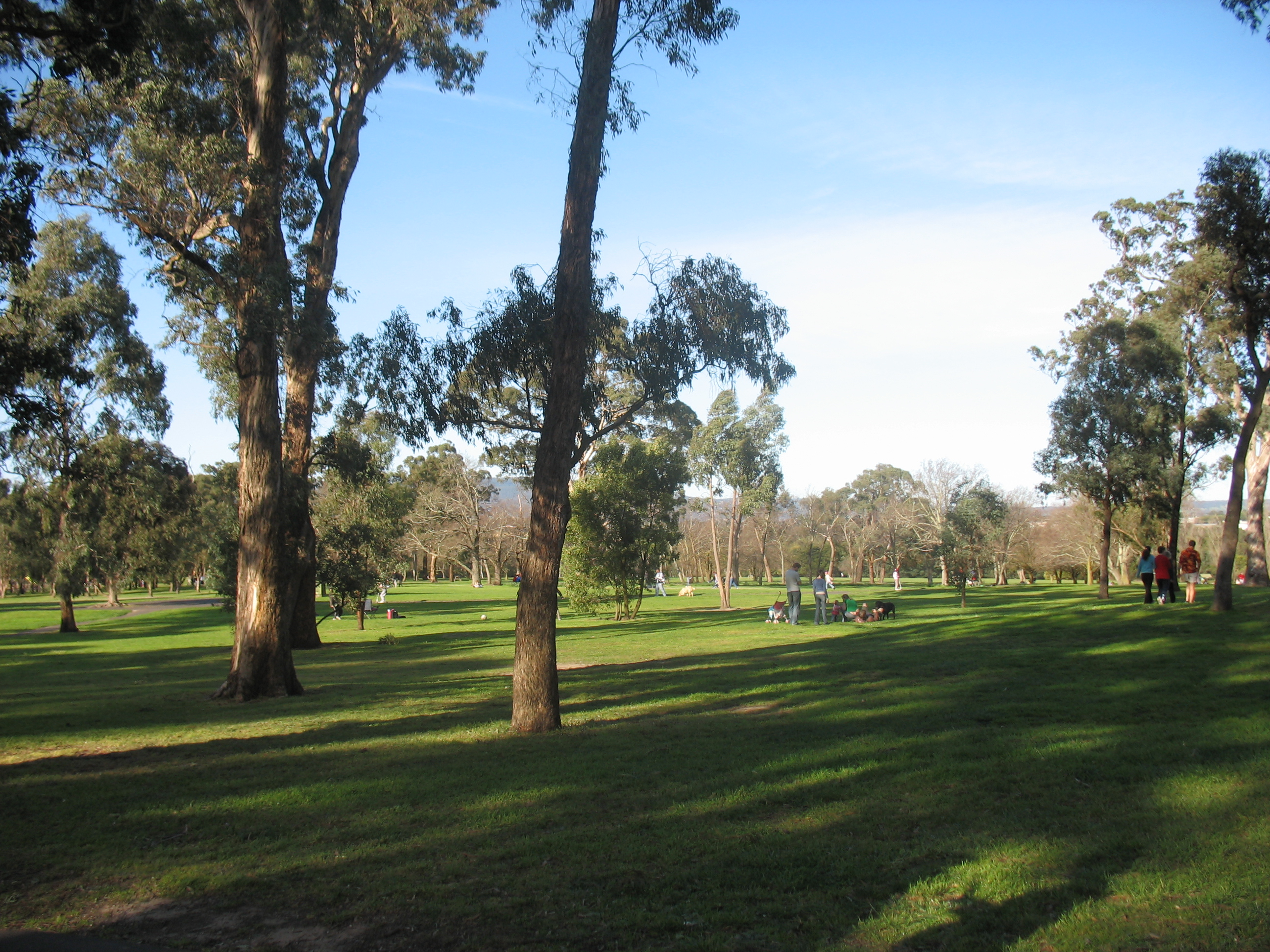
A picnic area at the park

== See also ==
- Parks and gardens of Melbourne
