= Dandenong Creek Trail =

Suburban trail in Melbourne, Australia

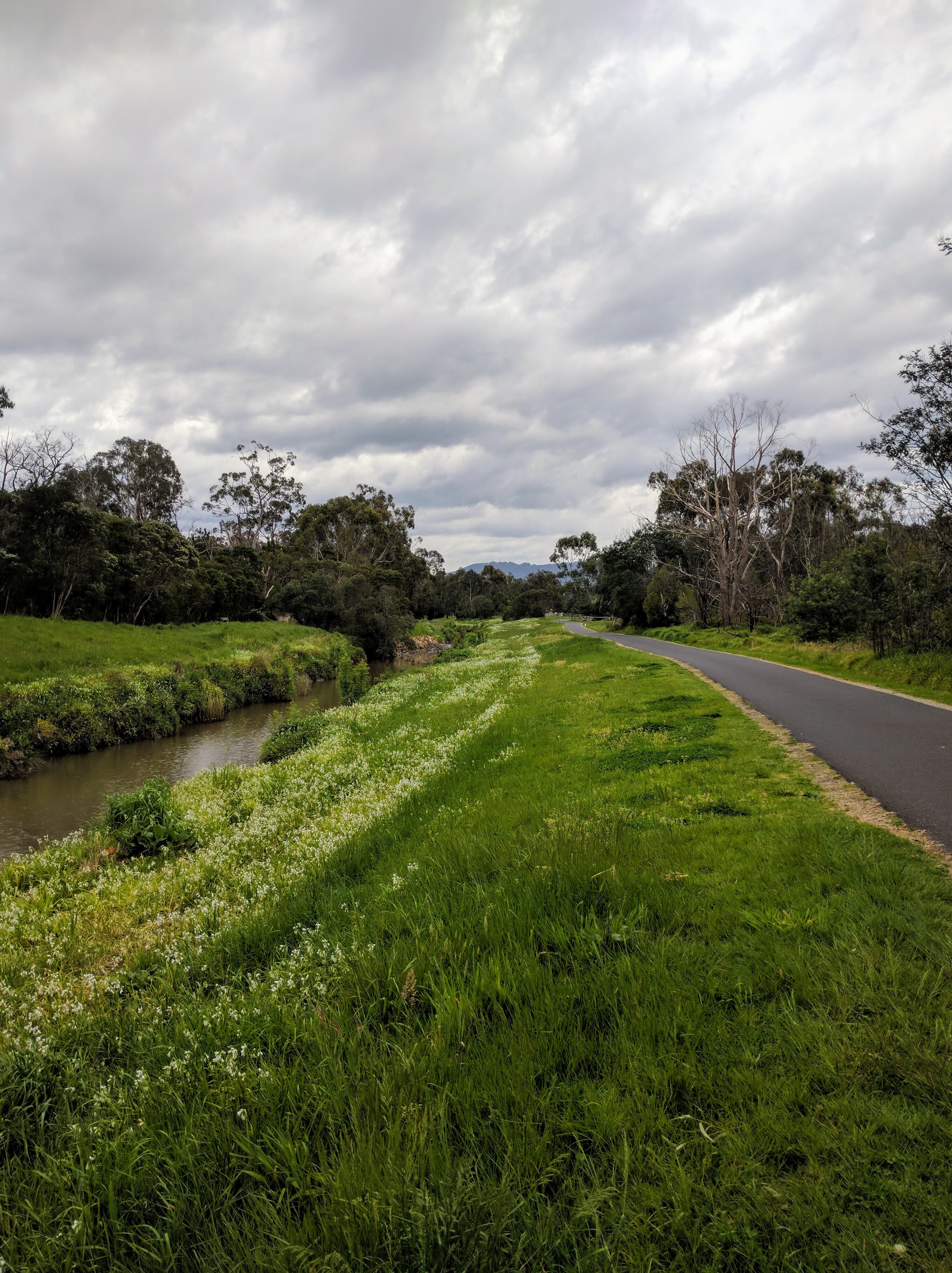
- Dandenong Creek and trail in Heathmont
- Length: Approx. 44 km from Kilsyth South to Carrum
- Location: Melbourne, Victoria, Australia
- Difficulty: Easy
- Hazards: Water/mud/frost on paths; fallen trees
- Surface: Mostly concrete & bitumen path, well formed gravel in some areas
- Hills: Minor hill in Vermont South
- Water: Drinking fountains in most parks along path
- Trains: Bayswater, Glen Waverley, Dandenong, Carrum

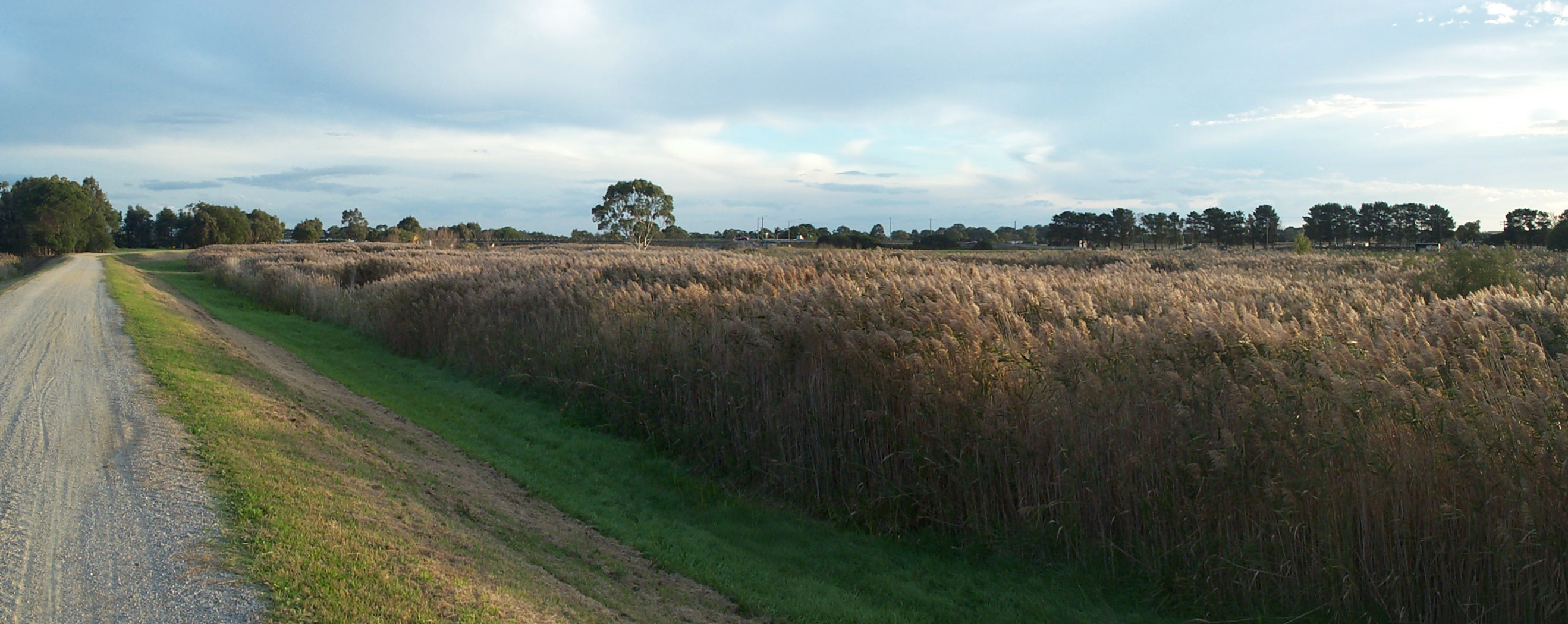
View from Dandenong Creek trail in Dandenong South

The Dandenong Creek Trail is a shared use path for cyclists and pedestrians, which follows Dandenong Creek through the outer eastern and south-eastern suburbs of Melbourne, Victoria, Australia.

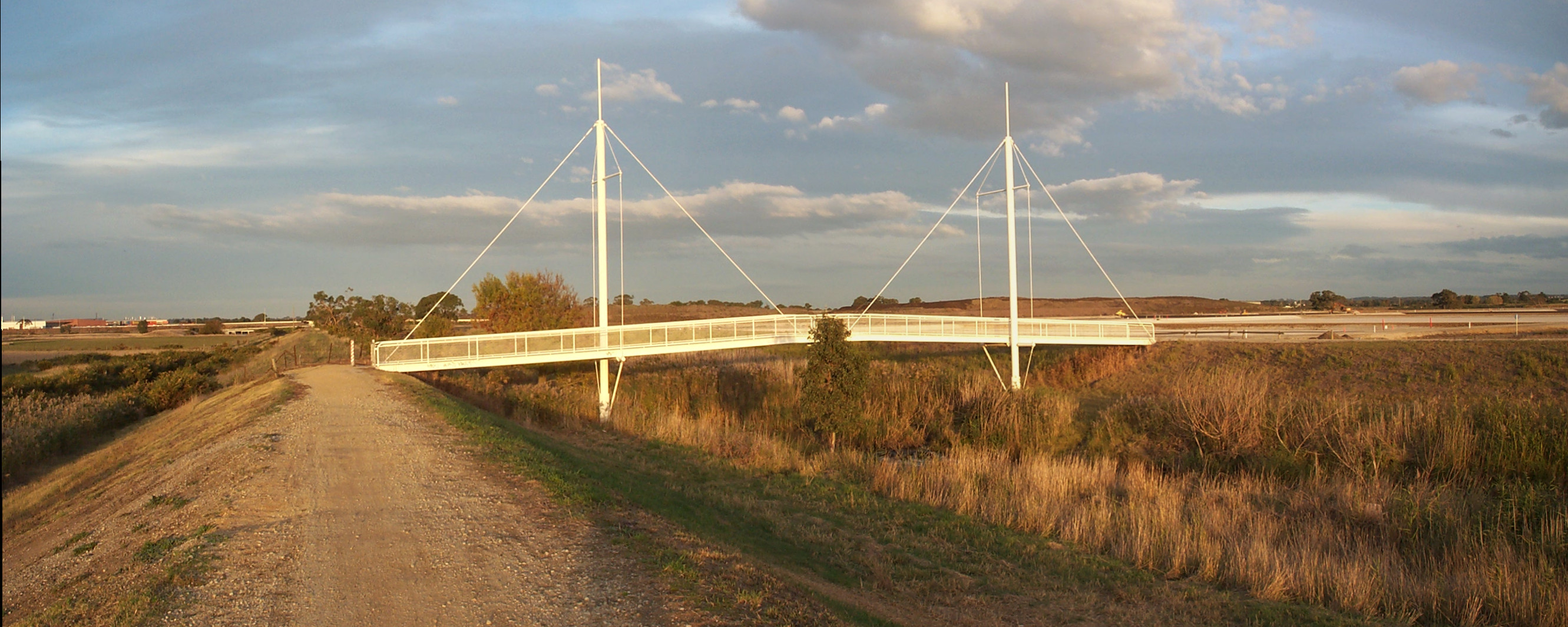
Bicycle and pedestrian bridge crossing the Eumemmerring Creek in Bangholme

== Route ==
The trail can be divided into three sections (from north to south):

- Upper Dandenong Creek – Chandlers Lane (Kilsyth South) to Burwood Highway (Wantirna)
- Middle Dandenong Creek – Burwood Highway to Heatherton Road (Dandenong)
- Lower Dandenong Creek – Heatherton Road to Patterson River mouth (Carrum)

=== Upper Dandenong Creek ===
At its northern end the path starts in Kilsyth South at the end of Chandlers Lane, 600 m off Liverpool Road. It can also be accessed at Colchester Road by a path that runs from The Basin through the Mountain Highway-Colchester Road Linear Reserve.

The trail crosses a footbridge after about 3.6 km on the western side of Bayswater Oval. Jim Abernethy Memorial Drive can be accessed at the southern end of this bridge, connecting the trail to the Knox Cycleway and Marie Wallace Bayswater Park.

Continuing west on the Dandenong Creek Trail, a tunnel goes under the Belgrave railway line. 70 m immediately before the underpass, there is a footbridge to north. This is the start of the Tarralla Creek Trail. Just before the underpass there is a turnoff to the south to the upper section of the Ringwood–Belgrave Rail Trail. On the far side of the tunnel is a footbridge to the north. This is the turnoff to the lower section of the Ringwood–Belgrave Rail Trail. At 650 m further south is a turnoff to Waldheim Road, joining the Stud Rd path. This 1.5 km stretch is effectively a major intersection for trails and is unsigned.

The trail continues under EastLink and then starts to head south along the boundary of Campbells Croft Reserve. It goes through an underpass at Boronia Road in Wantirna.

The trail through Koomba Park has been upgraded to concrete as this section is shared with the EastLink Trail. There are several intersections between Dandenong Creek Trail and EastLink Trail throughout the park.

Just north of Burwood Highway the trail passes along some boardwalks.

=== Middle Dandenong Creek ===
The trail crosses over Burwood Highway and continues alongside the entrance to the Whitehorse Recycling and Waste Centre. It then passes through Lookout Trail Park, a small suburban park containing a network of boardwalks and a lookout with views of the surrounding suburbs and the Dandenong Ranges.

The trail then passes through Bushy Park Wetlands in Glen Waverley, before crossing under High Street Road. It then leads through Shepherds Bush and Napier Park Reserve. It then meets Shepherd Road with the Glenvale Tennis courts to the south, and continues at the eastern end of Shepherd Road. The western end of the road leads to Glen Waverley station 2.6 km long council-designated bicycle route through back streets.

The Dandenong Creek Trail then arrives at an intersection with display cabinet and shelter. Towards the east is the west end of the Blind Creek Trail. To the north is a dead end trail to Nortons Park. Dandenong Creek Trail continues to the south past the map cabinet.

1.6 km further south, the trail crosses a footbridge at the most northern end of the Jells Park wildlife lake. There is a small tee intersection at this point. Dandenong Creek Trail continues to the south, passing along the west side of the lake. Travellers coming from the south need to turn right at the intersection and cross the footbridge.

At the southern end of the lake, the Scotchmans Creek Trail peels off to the west. Dandenong Creek Trail then passes under Ferntree Gully Road, which is commonly flooded. From here the Ferny Creek Trail can be reached by travelling along 3.6 km of road (east along Ferntree Gully Roadd and then south along Stud Road).

1.3 km on at Mulgrave Reserve, just north of Wellington Road the route is obscure and requires a sharp turn at the northern end of the carpark, following the north east corner of the carpark. Improvements associated with the Eastlink tollway and trail have provided a well signposted detour as an alternative route here.

The trail then goes under the Wellington Road underpass, under EastLink, then past the dead end of Police Road. The trail narrows between the creek and some houses and 600 m from Police Road opens out onto Tirhatuan Park, the homestead of Reverend James Clow. There are a few paths through the park but it is easier to follow the creek and skirt the park on its east side.

=== Lower Dandenong Creek ===
Dandenong Creek Trail then passes Stud Road, Brady Road, Monash Freeway, Heatherton Road, the east end of David Street (see photo), and Kidds Road. At McCrae Street, south of the Thomas P. Carroll Reserve, a turn-off leads to the Hallam Bypass Trail through a short on-road section.

Dandenong Creek at David Street, Dandenong

Another 1.1 km at Lonsdale Street, a short diversion leads to Dandenong Station. In Bangholme, a footbridge crosses Eumemmerring Creek, just after crossing EastLink for the third time. To continue on Dandenong Creek Trail, one must loop over the bridge but maintain the original south westerly direction. Downstream from Eumemmerring Creek, the stream becomes the Patterson River.

The creek widens with large wetland areas and the Eastern Treatment Plant to the south. The trail travels along an artificial embankment as it passes to the south of National Water Sports Centre near Patterson Lakes.

650 m from the mouth of the Patterson River, the trail meets the Bayside Trail at Launching Way.

== Landmarks ==
Popular sporting and recreational grounds along the route include:

- Dandenong Creek
- Koomba Park
- Jells Park
- Dandenong Valley Wetlands
- Port Phillip Bay

== Connections ==
The Dandenong Creek Trail connects to numerous other paths:

- Tarralla Creek Trail, Belgrave Rail Trail and Blind Creek Trail in the north
- Scotchmans Creek Trail and EastLink Trail in the centre
- Hallam Bypass Trail, Dandenong South Trail, and Bayside Trail in the south

Another path leads through to Waldheim Road and then joins Stud Road at Mountain Highway. It continues down Stud Road to Burwood Highway, at Westfield Knox, where the Blind Creek Trail can be found.

The north and south ends of the trail are 37.8419°S 145.311°E and 38.073092°S 145.122138°E, respectively.
