= Mordialloc, Victoria =

Mordialloc
- Suburb
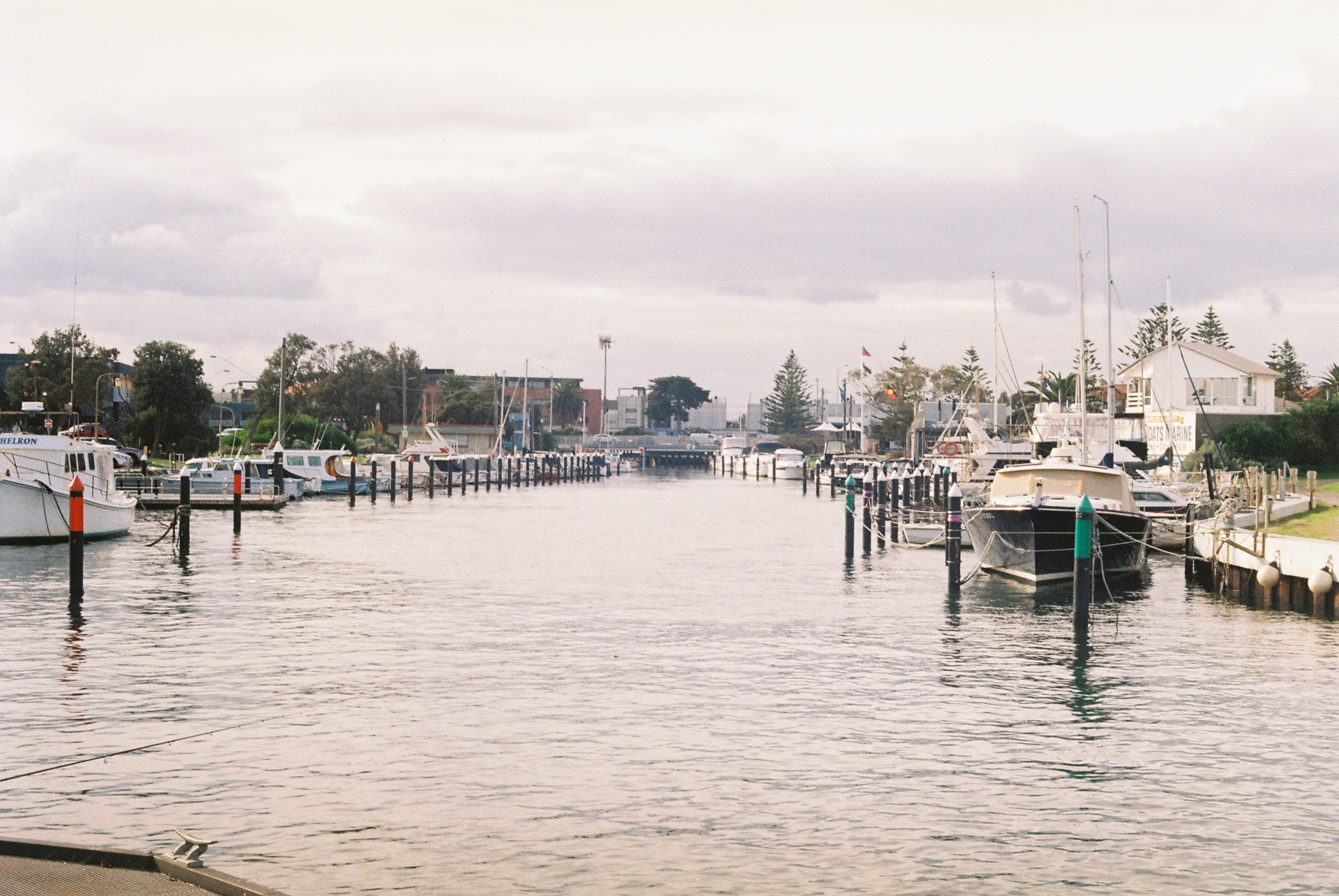
- Mordialloc 2024

- Interactive map of Mordialloc
- Coordinates: 37°59′58″S 145°05′46″E
- Country: Australia
- State: Victoria
- City: Melbourne
- LGA: City of Kingston
- Location: 24 km (15 mi) from Melbourne

Government
  - State electorate: Mordialloc
  - Federal division: Isaacs

Area
  - Total: 4.4 km^{2} (1.7 sq mi)

Population
  - Total: 8,886 (2021 census)
  - Density: 2,020/km^{2} (5,230/sq mi)
- Postcode: 3195
Suburbs around Mordialloc
Parkdale	Moorabbin Airport	Dingley Village
Port Phillip	Mordialloc	Braeside
Port Phillip	Aspendale	Aspendale Gardens

Mordialloc (/ˌmɔːdiˈælək/ MOR-dee-AL-ək) is a beachside suburb in Melbourne, Victoria, Australia, 24 km south-east of Melbourne's Central Business District, located within the City of Kingston local government area. Mordialloc recorded a population of 8,886 at the 2021 census.

== History ==
Originally "Moody Yallock", the name is derived from the term moordy yallock which originated from the Aboriginal language Boonwurrung, in which "yallock" means "creek" or "water", and is listed in some sources as meaning muddy creek, and in others as "little sea." from c.1850 was the site of the Mordialloc Aboriginal Reserve.

Mordialloc Post Office opened on 17 October 1863. In 1995 it was renamed Braeside Business Centre, and a new Mordialloc office opened near the railway station.

In the 1970s, a green ban imposed by the Builders Labourers Federation stopped a Coles Supermarket being built that would result in the eviction and destruction of several homes.

The namesaked Mordialloc Creek is arguably the most significant feature of the suburb. Home to Pompei's boat works, Mordialloc Creek has a rich history of traditional wooden boat building. Many classic boats line the banks of the creek. The creek mouth section below Nepean Highway is also home to the Mordialloc Motor Yacht Club and Mordialloc Sailing Club, and the creek drains into the Beaumaris Bay flanked by the Mordialloc Pier.

On 8 June 2018, a pilot of a Moorabbin-bound light plane, Cessna 172 (VH-EWE), died when his plane crashed and burst into flames in a street in Mordialloc. ATC recordings indicated he had an engine failure on approach.

== Transport ==
=== Bus ===
5 bus routes service Mordialloc:

- 705 : Mordialloc – Springvale. Operated by Ventura Bus Lines.
- 708 : Carrum – Hampton. Operated by Ventura Bus Lines.
- 709 : Mordialloc – Noble Park Station. Operated by Ventura Bus Lines.
- 902 : Chelsea – Westfield Airport West. Operated by Kinetic Melbourne.
- SmartBus 903 : Altona station – Mordialloc. Operated by Kinetic Melbourne.

=== Train ===
- Mordialloc railway station is on the Frankston railway line. It was rebuilt in 2026 as part of the state government’s level crossing removal program.

== Schools ==
- Mordialloc College – Mordialloc
- Mordialloc Beach Primary School – Mordialloc
- St Brigids Mordialloc

== Sport ==
The suburb has an Australian rules football team competing in the Southern Football League.

Golfers play at the Woodlands Golf Club on White Street, Mordialloc.

The Epsom Park Horse Racing track was situated in Mordialloc. Now a housing estate, in its heyday at the beginning of the 20th century it was one of Victoria's premier race tracks. Later in life it became a training track before being eventually closed in the 1980s. In 2008, Doug Denyer Reserve, situated in Epsom Park hosted it first ever cricket season with Mordialloc Redbacks being the home team, Redbacks being a part of the Mordialloc Cricket Club. The Redbacks first Junior Head Coach at Epsom Park was David Beckett.

The suburb has a social baseball team, the Mordialloc Ducks Baseball Club, competing in the Dandenong Baseball Association in winter and the Victorian Baseball Summer League in summer. They play at the Kingston Heath Reserve in Cheltenham, where the grounds are primarily used by the Cheltenham Baseball Club.

== Walking/cycling trails ==
There are numerous walking/cycling trails in Mordialloc, including the:

- Long Beach Trail from the Patterson River to the Mordialloc Pier.
- Bay Trail from Seaford to Port Melbourne.
- Mordialloc Creek Trail from the Mordialloc Pier to Aspendale Gardens.
- Numerous 'desire paths' (or goat tracks) that run next to the Mordialloc Creek between the Wells Road bridge and the Boat Ramp near Chute Street.

== Notable locals ==
- Scott Boland, test cricketer
- Geoffrey Connard AM, politician
- "Smacka" Fitzgibbon, entertainer
- Mary Hannay Foott, author
- Winnie George cricketer
- George Hanlon, horse trainer
- Janine Ilitch netball player
- Cat Hope, composer and academic
- Julius Herz, musician
- Jack Holt, a horse trainer known as the "Wizard of Mordialloc"
- Cecilia John, singer and social activist
- George Furner Langley, soldier and teacher
- Katie Loynes footballer, teacher
- Daniel Mackinnon, pastoralist
- Rex Mortimer, solicitor and academic
- Sir Murray Tyrrell, public servant
- Tim Richardson (politician)
- Bill Templeton, politician
- Bill Williamson, jockey
- Tommy Woodcock, horse trainer
- Lorraine Wreford politician
- David Kinsella, Mail thief catcher

== Gallery ==
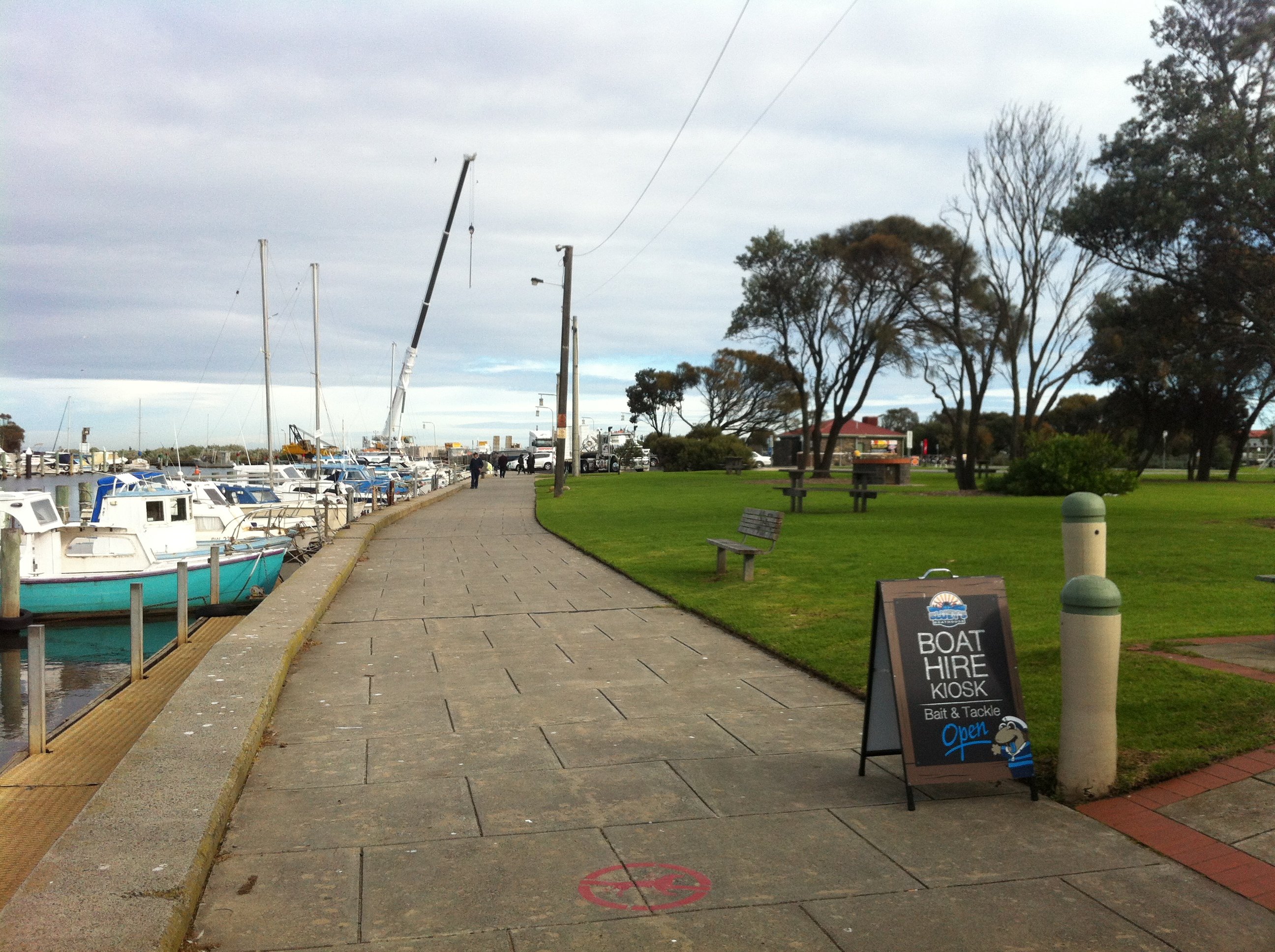
Path along Mordialloc Creek

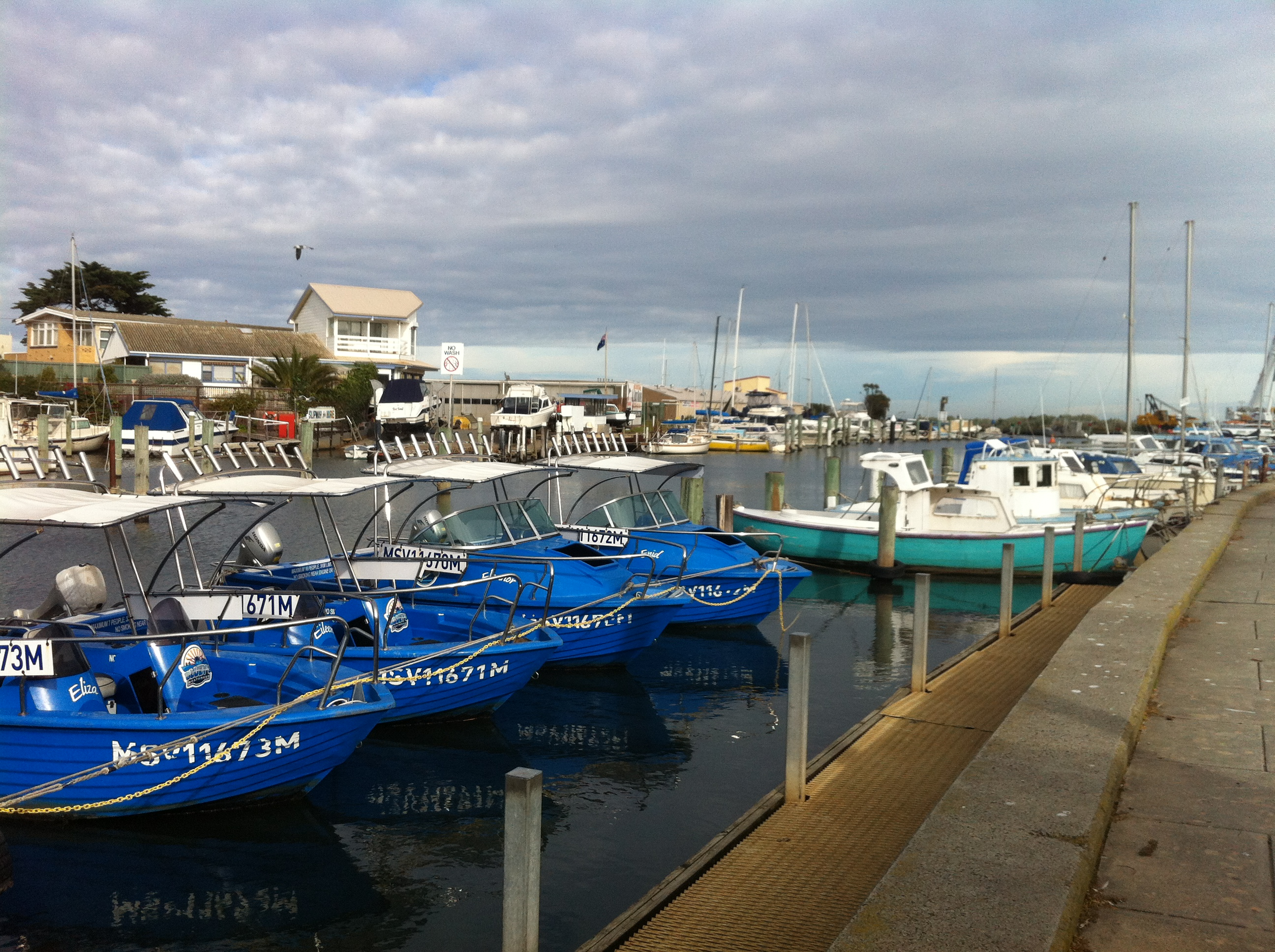
Boats on Mordialloc Creek

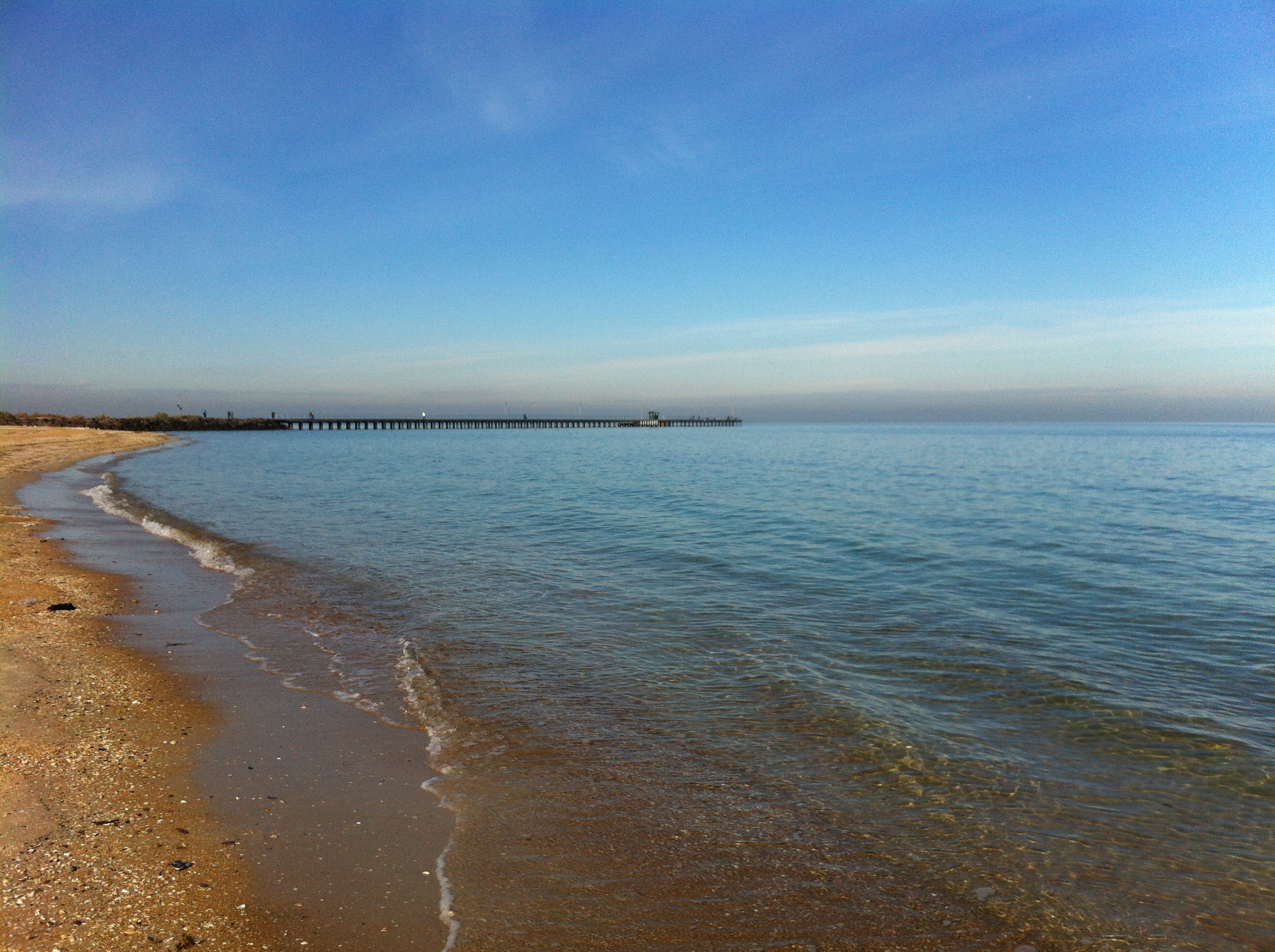
Beach and Pier at Mordialloc

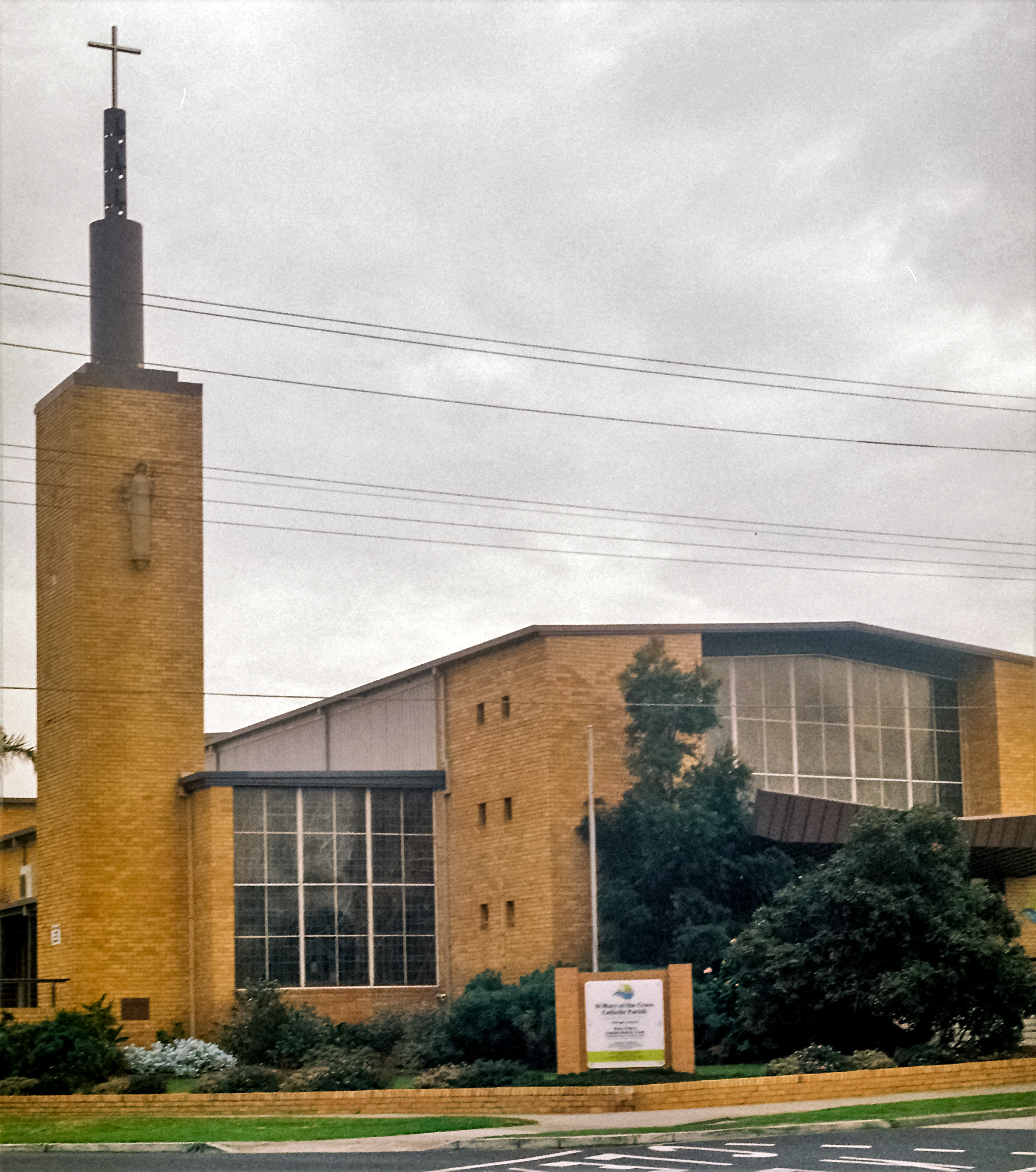
Catholic Church at Mordialloc

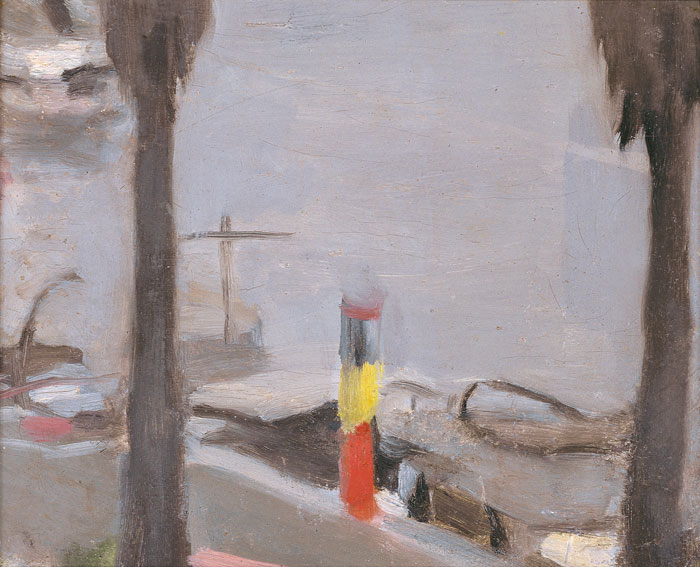
Clarice Beckett – Mordialloc Pier (The Petrol Pump)

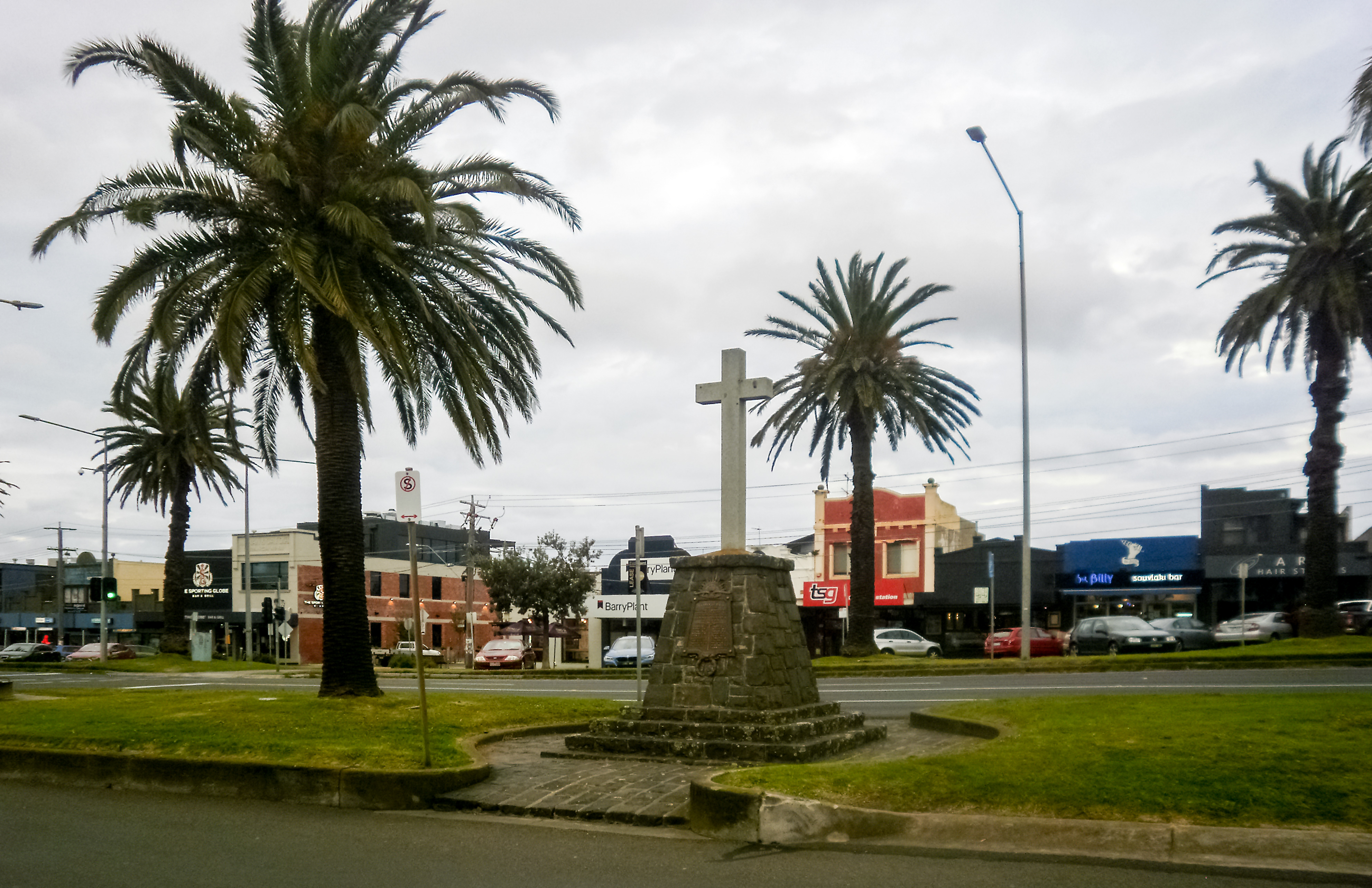
Mordialioc Cross

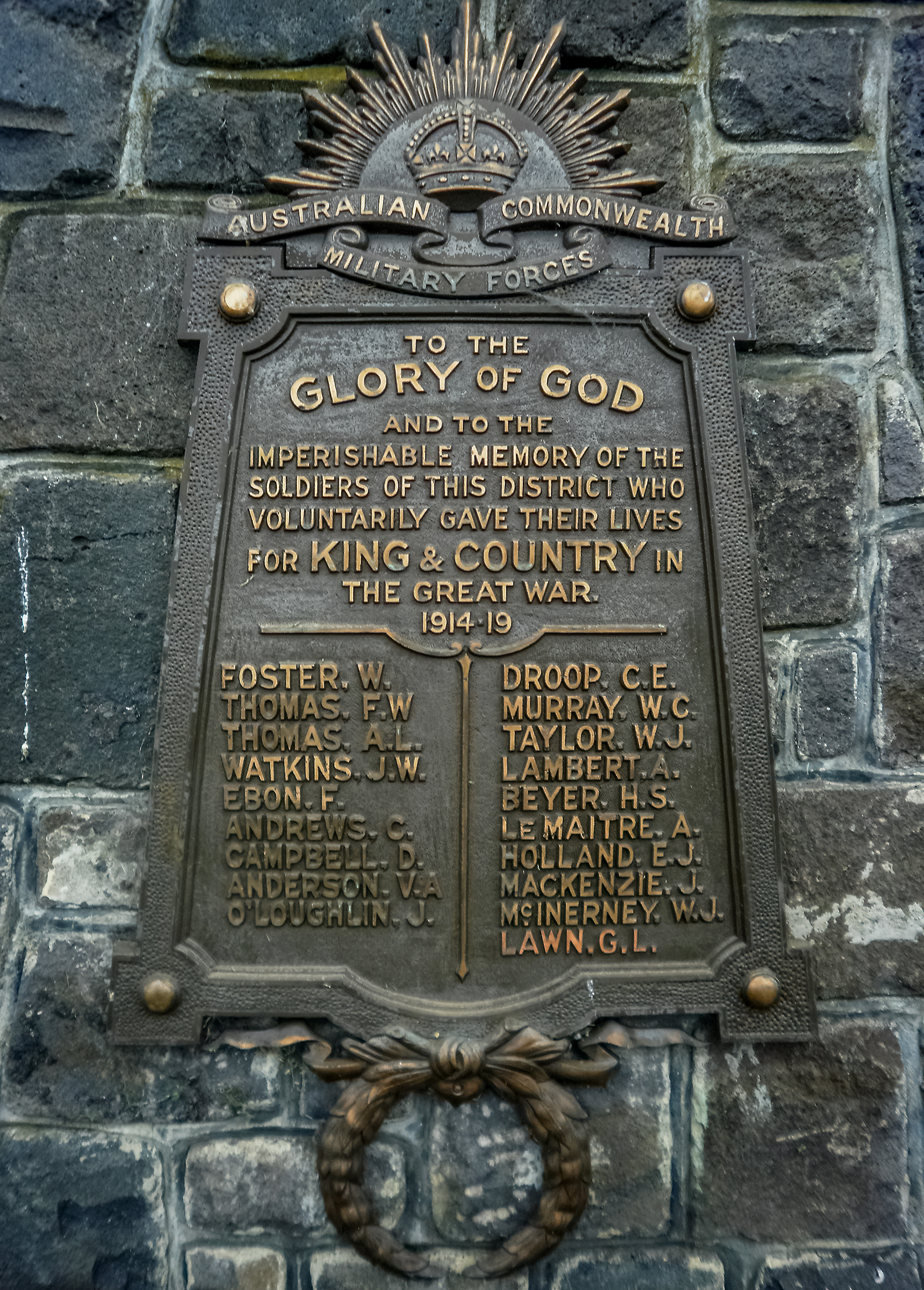
The cross Plaque Mordialloc

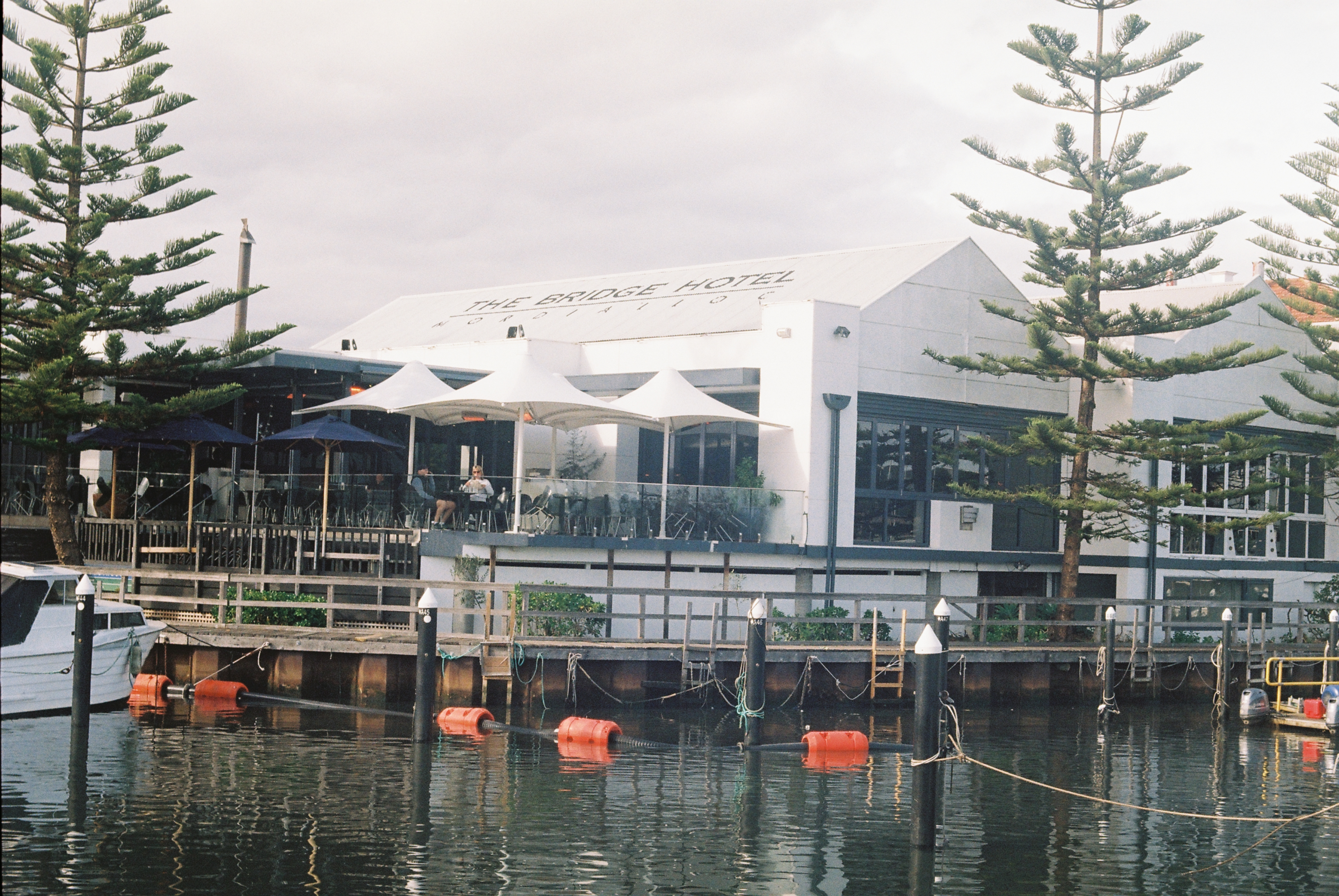
Bridge Hotel

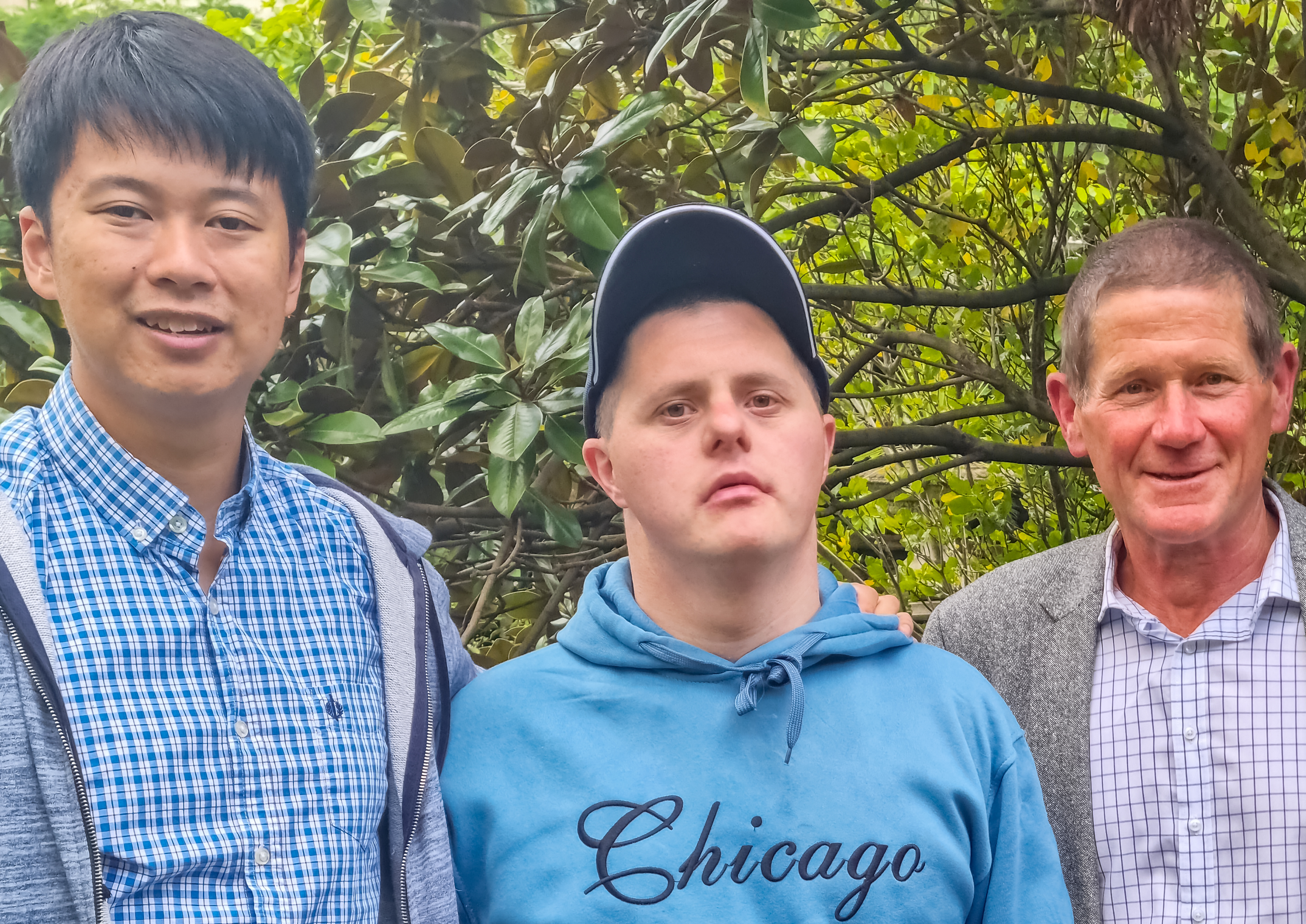
Former Mordialloc Mayor Geoff Gledhill (Pictured on far right) in 2022 https://baysidenews.com.au/2017/08/16/gledhill-gets-libs-nod-seat-tilt/

== See also ==
- City of Mordialloc – Mordialloc was previously within this former local government area.
- Electoral district of Mordialloc
