= Blind Creek Trail =

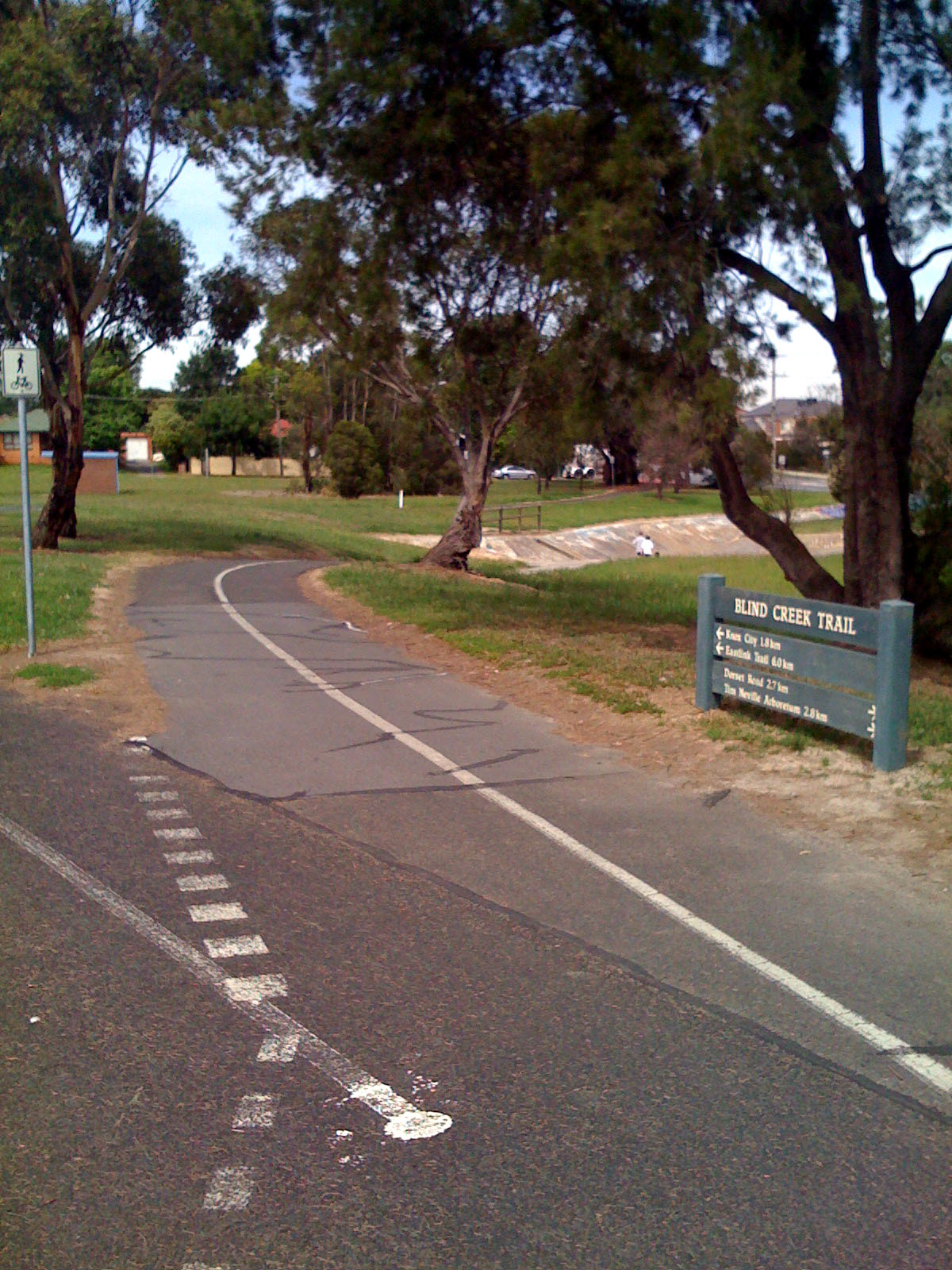
- The Blind Creek Trail near Scoresby Road in Ferntree Gully.
- Length: 11.5 km
- Location: Melbourne, Victoria, Australia
- Difficulty: Easy
- Hazards: Some blind corners, a handful of road crossings, damaged path surface in some areas
- Surface: Mostly asphalt, minor concrete sections
- Hills: Minor hill near the Dandenong Creek Trail
- Parking: Shepherd Road, Glen Waverley; Nortons Park, Wantirna South; Collier Reserve, Wantirna South; Westfield Knox, Wantirna South; Lewis Park, Wantirna South; Fairpark Reserve, Ferntree Gully; Boronia Tennis Club, Ferntree Gully; Tim Neville Arboretum, Ferntree Gully

The Blind Creek Trail, in the outer eastern suburbs of Melbourne, in the Australian state of Victoria, is a shared-use path for cyclists and pedestrians, which follows the Blind Creek from the Dandenong Creek Trail in Wantirna South to the Ringwood - Belgrave Rail Trail in Boronia.

This trail is one of the major shared use trails which runs through the City of Knox and runs past Westfield Knox and the Tim Neville Arboretum along its 11.5 km route. During November 2008, directional signage was installed along most of the path to assist users in guiding themselves to their desired destinations.

An interactive map of the trail as well as others in the Melbourne area is available here.

== Route ==
Travelling from the Ringwood - Belgrave Rail Trail to the Dandenong Creek Trail heading west, the trail begins 1.2 km north of Ferntree Gully Station, at a train line underpass on the Ringwood - Belgrave Rail Trail. It goes through the underpass.

Traveling downhill and in a westerly direction, the trail soon passes the Tim Neville Arboretum and continues on without navigational difficulty to Scoresby Road. It passes through a light industrial area and then follows the wall of Melbourne Water's retarding basin to the immediate north of Westfield Knox. Passing by the centre's car parks, it comes to a halt at Stud Road near Burwood Highway.

On the west side of Stud Road the path restarts by one of the many pieces of art dedicated to Hubert Opperman, that are found in the City of Knox. It heads south east and pass under Burwood Highway.

After 2.2 km, the path reaches High Street Road just to the east of EastLink. Crossing High Street Road to the south, access is made available by the pedestrian crossing or the road underpass. The latter is sometimes swamped. It heads left (east) to continue on the trail. Going west at High Street Road leads to the EastLink Trail on the far side (west side) of the tollway. One kilometre south of High Street Road, the Blind Creek Trail heads west and goes under the tollway and under the EastLink Trail. It continues on the path that leads to Norton Lane.

The St Pauls missionary college is straight ahead. It turns left (south) down Nortons Lane and picks up the trail at the end of the lane. Three hundred and thirty metres west from here is the Dandenong Creek Trail intersection. This junction is badly signed in all directions, so it pays to review this point before heading out.

== Connections ==
The trail meets the Dandenong Creek Trail in the west and the Belgrave Rail Trail in the east. A decrepit path along Scoresby Road leads to the Ferny Creek Trail to the south. Another path beside Stud Road leads to the Dandenong Creek Trail to the north, via Waldheim Road.

West end at 37.885239°S 145.196011°E. East end at 37.872150°S 145.290132°E.
