= Hunter Valley bus crash =

2023 Australian fatal vehicle rollover

- Aftermath of the crash

Details
- Date: 11 June 2023; 23:30
- Location: Greta, New South Wales
- Country: Australia
- Operator: Linq Buslines
- Service: Charter
- Incident type: Rollover
- Cause: High speed, driver culpability and medication impairment

Statistics
- Bus: Volvo B7R
- Vehicles: 1
- Passengers: 35
- Crew: 1
- Deaths: 10
- Injured: 25

On 11 June 2023, a bus overturned at Greta in the Hunter Valley, Australia. The bus was transferring guests from a wedding at Lovedale to Singleton. Ten people were killed with another 25 taken to hospital.

The bus driver pleaded guilty to dangerous and negligent driving occasioning death, and was sentenced to 32 years in prison with a non-parole period of 24 years. It was the worst Australian road crash since 1994 when twelve people were killed when a bus overturned near Boondall, Queensland.

== Crash ==
At 23:30 on 11 June 2023, a 2009 Coach Design bodied Volvo B7R bus operated by Linq Buslines overturned while negotiating a grade separated roundabout at the M15 / Wine Country Drive interchange near Greta. The bus was taking guests from a wedding at a winery in Lovedale to a Singleton hotel.

Ten passengers were killed and a further 25 were taken to hospitals. The injured were treated at John Hunter Hospital, Maitland Hospital and Calvary Mater in Newcastle, and one was airlifted to Royal Prince Alfred Hospital in Sydney.

== Legal proceedings ==
The 58-year-old bus driver, Brett Button, was arrested and taken to Cessnock police station. A mandatory drug test determined that he had taken 400 mg of tramadol during the previous 24 hours, enough to impair his driving ability. On 12 June he was charged with ten counts of dangerous driving occasioning death and one count of negligent driving occasioning death. He was released on bail of $10,000. In January 2024, Button was further charged with ten counts of manslaughter.

On 8 May 2024, after the prosecution dropped the manslaughter charges, Button pleaded guilty to ten counts of dangerous driving occasioning death and other charges. He was remanded in custody for sentencing later in 2024. It was also presented in court that Button was addicted to painkillers, and these may have affected his driving performance on the day of the crash.

On 11 September 2024, Button was sentenced to 32 years in prison, with a non-parole period of 24 years. Button has appealed against the severity of the sentence and errors in the judge's findings. His appeal will be heard on 3 October 2025.

On 14 November 2025, Button lost his appeal against the length of his sentence. The three appeal judges found that he did not meet any of the three grounds of his appeal, including that the sentence was unreasonable or unjust, Button will be eligible for parole in 2048.

On 16 June 2023, the NSW Office of Transport Safety Investigations announced an investigation into the crash. Their report was released on 31 July 2026. In August 2026, Linq Buslines was fined $650,000 and its two directors, Christopher Fogg and Anthony Royle, $12,000 each after pleading guilty to breaking multiple National Heavy Vehicle Regulator law breaches.

== Background ==
The bride and groom were members of the Singleton Roosters Australian football club. The groom was previously a member of Warrandyte Cricket Club, as were nine of the injured guests.

== Linq Buslines ==
Linq Buslines was a bus operator with depots in East Gresford and Wyong. It was established in July 2008 when Millers Coaches of East Gresford was purchased by a partnership of Christopher Fogg and Anthony Royle, who were the managing directors of Port Stephens Coaches and Forest Coach Lines respectively, with 11 vehicles. In December 2019, Road Runner Tours of Wyong was purchased with 11 vehicles.

It operated school services in the Hunter Valley under contract to Transport for NSW. It ceased in September 2025 when its Transport for NSW contracts were not renewed with its services taken over by the Buslines Group.

== See also ==
- List of traffic collisions (2000–present)
