= Warrandyte State Park =

Australian state park

Coordinates: 37.716°S 145.245°E

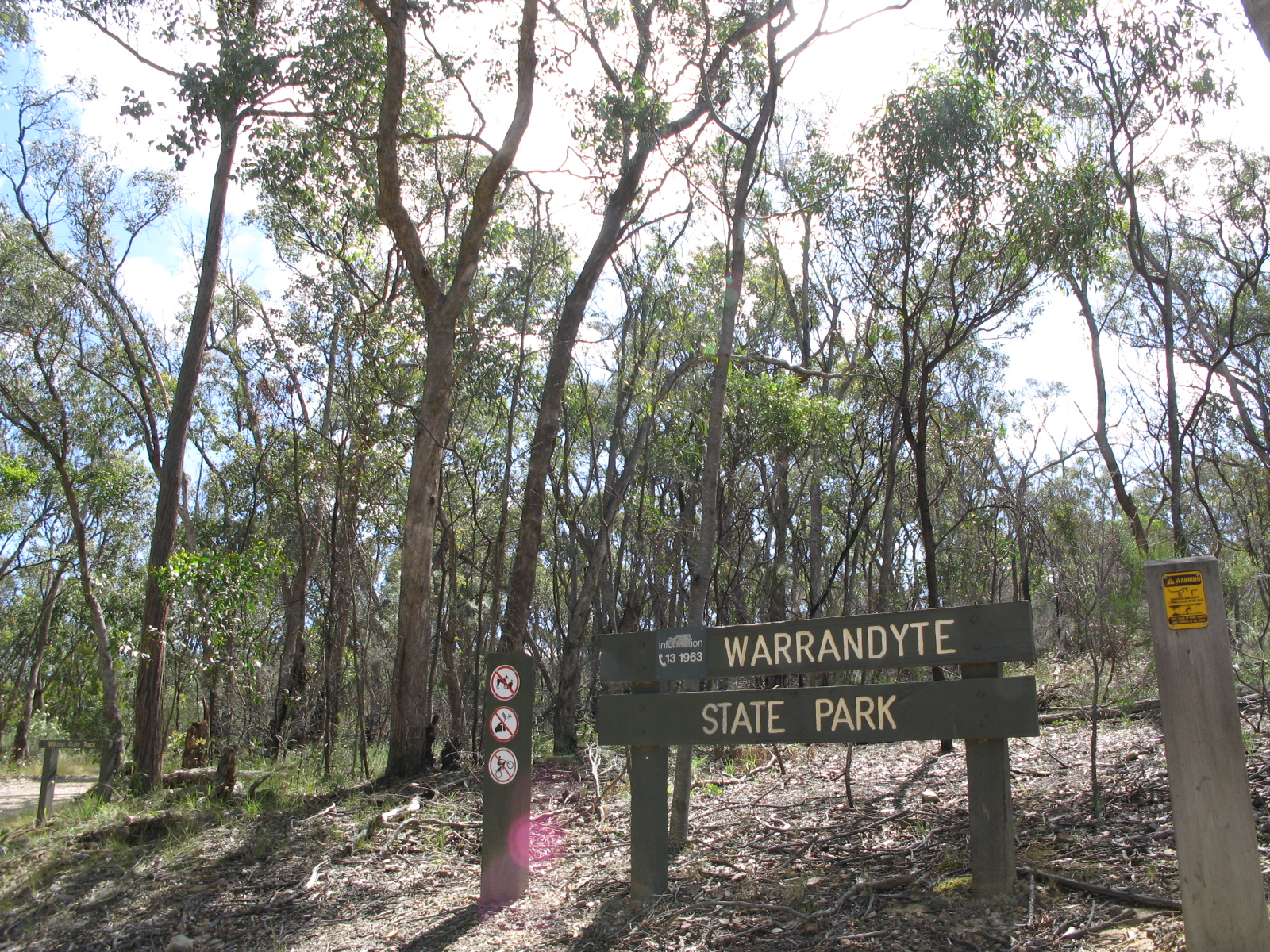
- The Warrandyte State Park at the tunnel street entrance
- Type: State Park
- Location: Melbourne, Australia
- Area: 586 hectares (1,450 acres)
- Opened: 1975
- Operator: Parks Victoria
- Status: Open (8:30am-9pm)
- Paths: Unsealed bush paths and hiking trails
- Terrain: Heavily forested hills, valleys, gullies, riverbanks and flats
- Water: Yarra River, Andersons Creek, Jumping Creek, Various other creeks and gullies
- Vegetation: Australian Native
- Public transit: Car (limited parking), Bus (indirect service)
- Landmarks: Yarra River, Fourth Hill, Warrandyte Gorge, Gold mine ruins
- Facilities: Toilets, Seating, Interpretive Signs, Canoe Ramp

Warrandyte State Park is a state park, located in Warrandyte, east of Melbourne, Victoria on the banks of the Yarra River and surroundings. The park comprises 586 hectares of remnant bushland in various locations throughout Warrandyte and Wonga Park around Pound Bend, Fourth Hill, Black Flat, Yarra Brae and various other locations in the area. It hosts many significant geographical, environmental, archaeological and historical sites, such as the site of the first gold discovery in Victoria in 1851 and preserves the sites of former gold mines and tunnels. It is a popular destination for school and community groups and is frequented by local bush walkers and hikers.

Land now occupied by the park was initially occupied by Indigenous Australians of the Wurundjeri nation. After European settlement, gold was discovered in Warrandyte, and the area was mined for a number of years. Frequent clearing had at one stage removed all the vegetation in the area, and bushfires have erased much of the recent human architectural history of the area. However, they have ensured the health of the bushland and reduced the impact of human settlements, enabling the vegetation to recover throughout the 20th century. The major threats to the park's ecology are introduced species of flora and fauna such as foxes, rabbits, dogs and cats. Being located close to suburban settlements, backburning is regularly undertaken within the park to minimise risk of bushfires.

== History ==
Land now occupied by the park was initially occupied by Indigenous Australians of the Wurundjeri nation. After European settlement in Melbourne, settlers were slow to spread out into the hills east of Melbourne into the Warrandyte area, but with the discovery of gold at Andersons Creek in July 1851, the first gold licences in Victoria were issued. At the turn of the century, the settlement at Warrandyte, employed about 250 miners. Much of the area was mined heavily throughout the late 19th and early 20th centuries, this was done in sections leaving large slots or "stopes" underground where the reef had been. Many of these mine shafts, structures and stopes remain as ruins throughout the park.

The park itself was established in 1975 in an effort to protect areas geographic, environmental, historical and archeological significance around Warrandyte. Stane Brae and Yarra Brae, were later added because of their conservation value. The most recent addition to the park was the Mount Lofty area in 1997.

== Geography ==
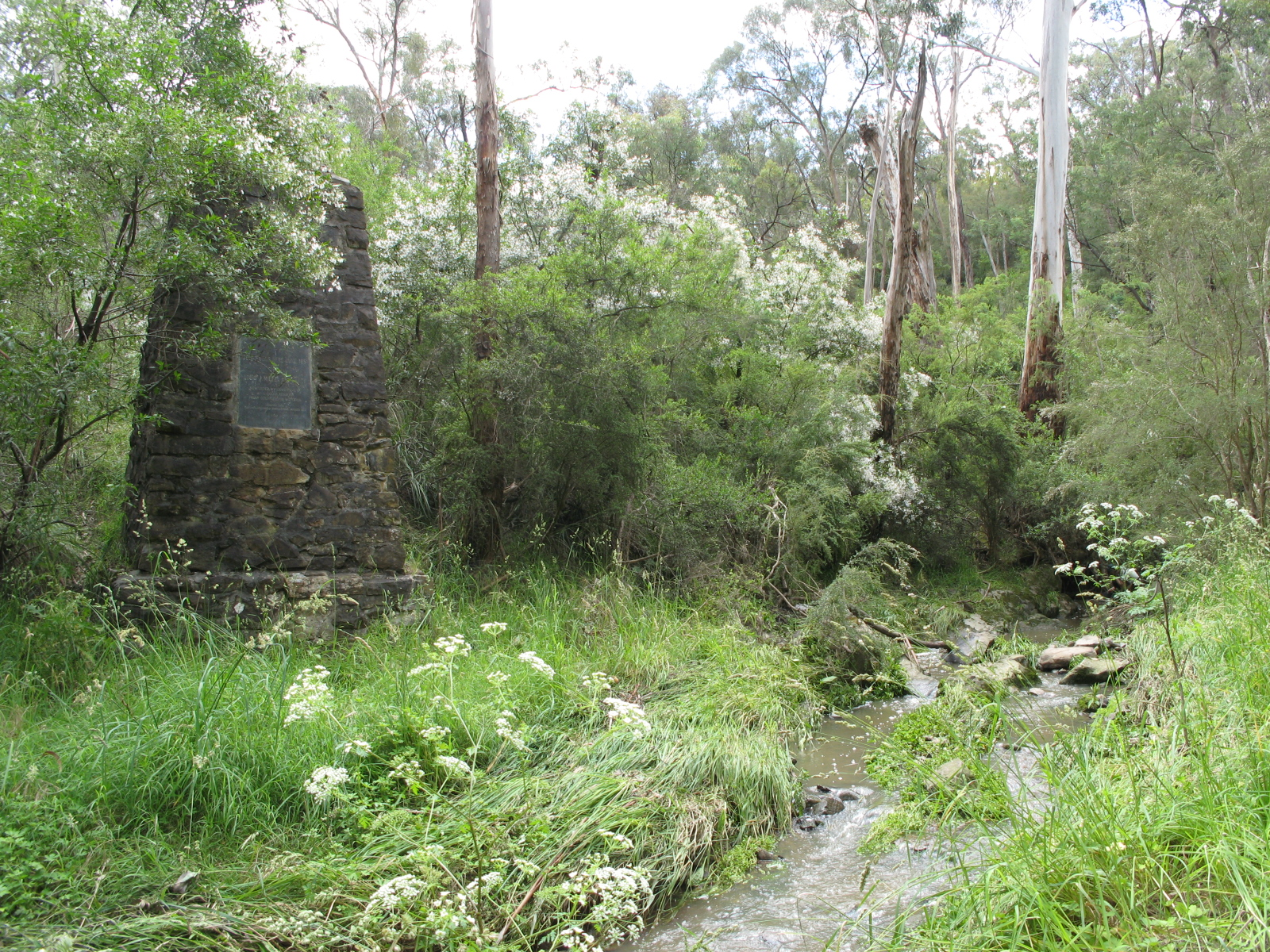
The cairn marking the site of the first recognised discovery of gold in Victoria in 1851 at Andersons Creek.

The park is located around 25 km upstream of the mouth of the Yarra River in Warrandyte, 24 km east of Melbourne. The park in its entirety comprises several detached areas of land adjoining the Yarra River from Pound Bend in the west, through Warrandyte to Wonga Park through the Warrandyte Gorge to Mount Lofty in the east. Other areas of land are situated throughout the hills immediately south of Warrandyte. The various areas include (roughly from west to east);

- Pound Bend - Includes the area around Pound Bend in the Yarra River, the westernmost section of the state park.
  Pound Bend Tunnel - a 145 metres long tunnel was constructed in 1870 to divert the Yarra River through it and drain the Pound Bend area for gold mining.
- Norman Reserve - a small reserve where Pound Bend begins upstream.
- Fourth Hill - one of the highest points in Warrandyte, intensively mined.
- Whipstick Gully - a gully to the north of Fourth Hill, intensively mined.
- Timber Reserve
- The Common
- Black Flat - an area of flat riverbank just south of Blue Tongue Bend near Jumping Creek.
- Jumping Creek - the area where Jumping Creek flows into the Yarra River.
- Yarra Brae - an area in the east of Warrandyte gorge on the southern banks of the river.
- Mount Lofty - the easternmost section of the state park.

Other smaller areas and reserves within the state park include:

- Scotchman's Hill - another hill in central Warrandyte, northeast of Fourth Hill
- The Island - an island/billabong in the river, heavily polluted by introduced species.
- Koornong - an area of land to the east of Blue Tongue Bend.
- Blue Tongue Bend - a bend in the river upstream from Jumping Creek.
- Gravel Reserve - a small reserve on Jumping Creek
- Stane Brae
- Bend of Isles - area to the north of Mount Lofty around a series of bends in the river.

=== Gold Mine Ruins & Structures ===
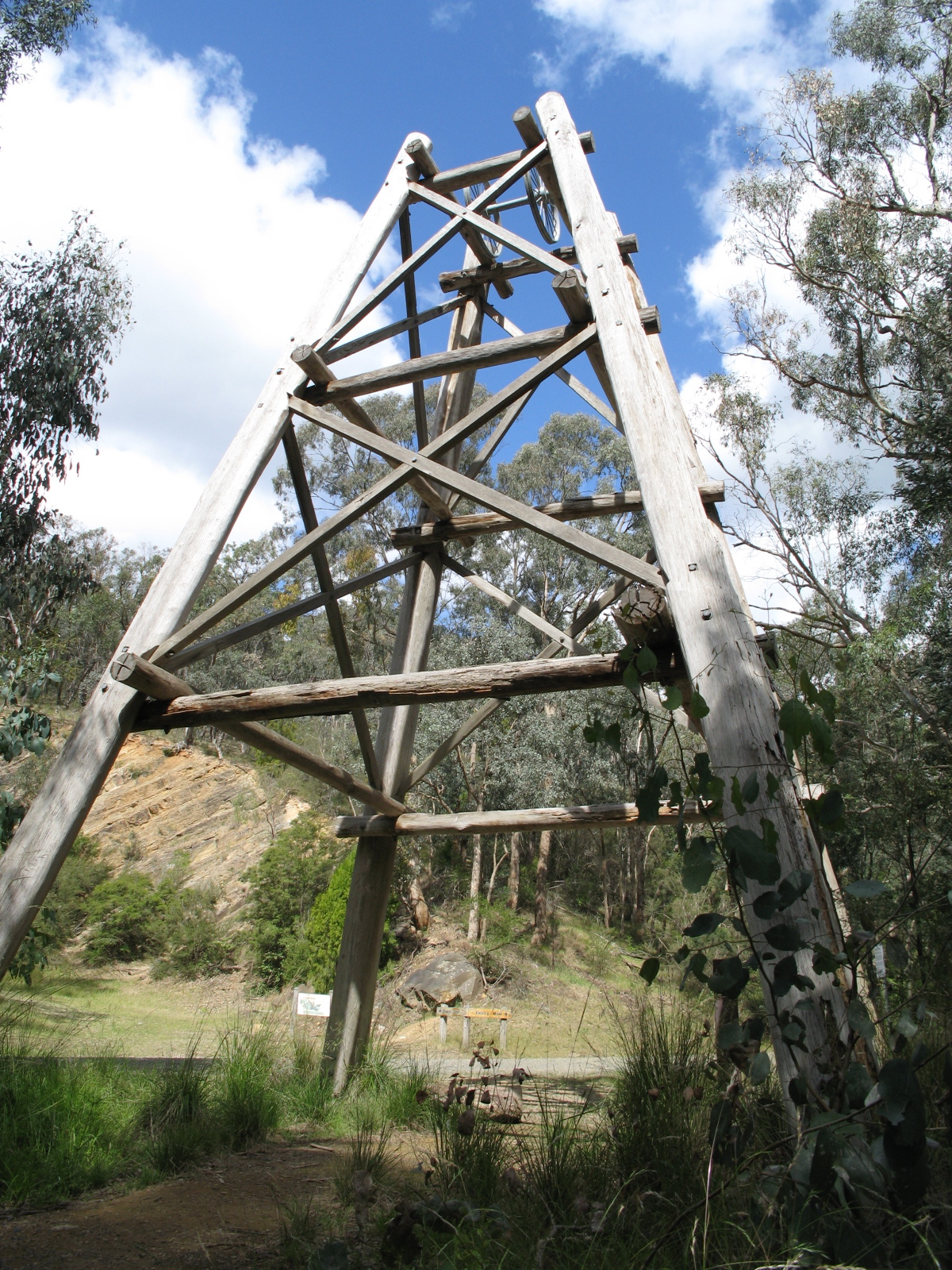
A headframe at Whipstick Gully near the Victory Mine.

The area around Fourth Hill and Whipstick Gully was the most intensively mined in the area, the Gold Heritage Walk is a trail that includes information boards and signage detailing the history of the goldfields in the area. Some of the ruins of former mines and structures include:

- Victory Mine - Previously known as Young Colonial and Warrandyte Claim, the Victory mine produced one of the richest recorded claims. It was worked from 1896 and produced 1,870oz in three years. The main shaft was sunk to 67m. The area includes the ruins of a steam-powered quartz crusher and a large quarry.
- Open Mines - Originally dug by Europeans, these open mines were often reworked by Chinese prospectors who were more successful at working the mines than the Europeans who frequently missed discoveries.
- Johnson's Mine - This mine involved a horizontal or "adit" tunnel 60m into the hill, following a small reef. Gold was not found and a second tunnel was dug 20m before the mine was abandoned.
- Upper Monument Mine
- Miner's Hut - built in the 1950s, all structures in these minefields built before 1939 were destroyed in the "Black Friday" bushfires of that year.
- Monument Mine - This type of shaft was operated by two or three people, the two mines remaining were in operation until the 1960s, the last working mines in the Fourth Hill area.
- Louis Michel Memorial - a cairn marking the spot where gold was first discovered in Victoria, erected in 1935.
- Geraghty's Mine - One of the most extensive mines in the area, the main tunnel was constructed from June 1859 - February 1860 and runs for 130m. Various tunnels branch off the main tunnel and a tramway was built to transport quartz from within the mine.

== Ecology ==
See Also: Flora of Australia, Fauna of Australia

The wildlife, so diverse on the fringe of such a big city, includes kangaroos, wallabies, wombats, platypus and koalas. Over 100 bird species have been recorded as well as many reptiles, frogs, fish and insects. Vegetation in the area was almost totally cleared during the late 19th and early 20th centuries, most of the vegetation seen today has regrown since then. Smooth-barked manna gums and silver wattles line the Yarra River, while an assortment of box eucalypts and other wattles cover the hills. Much of the hilly area is characterised by open, forested country, with an understorey of native grasses, creepers, orchids and other wildflowers.

== Recreation ==
A range of activities can be undertaken within the park and on the Yarra River, many of these activities can be guided or involve tours. The following is a list of the various activities and information regarding them in the park:

- Horse riding - Equestrian trails exist in the Fourth Hill, Whipstick Gully, Timber Reserve, The Common and Yarra Brae areas. Horses are only permitted on designated bridle trails only, and the trails are sometimes closed in bad weather. Maps of the trails are available here.
- Canoeing / kayaking - Canoeing and kayaking are popular along the Yarra River through much of the area occupied by the state park from Wonga Park into Warrandyte.
- Mountain biking - There are several trails throughout the park. However, riders are advised to stay on the designated trails as there are several mine shaft ruins off the trails, and mountain biking through bushland destroys understory vegetation.
- Walking and Hiking
- Abseiling & Rock Climbing - These are very occasionally run by guided groups in various sections of the park.

Fossicking- needs to purchase a miner's right

== Access ==
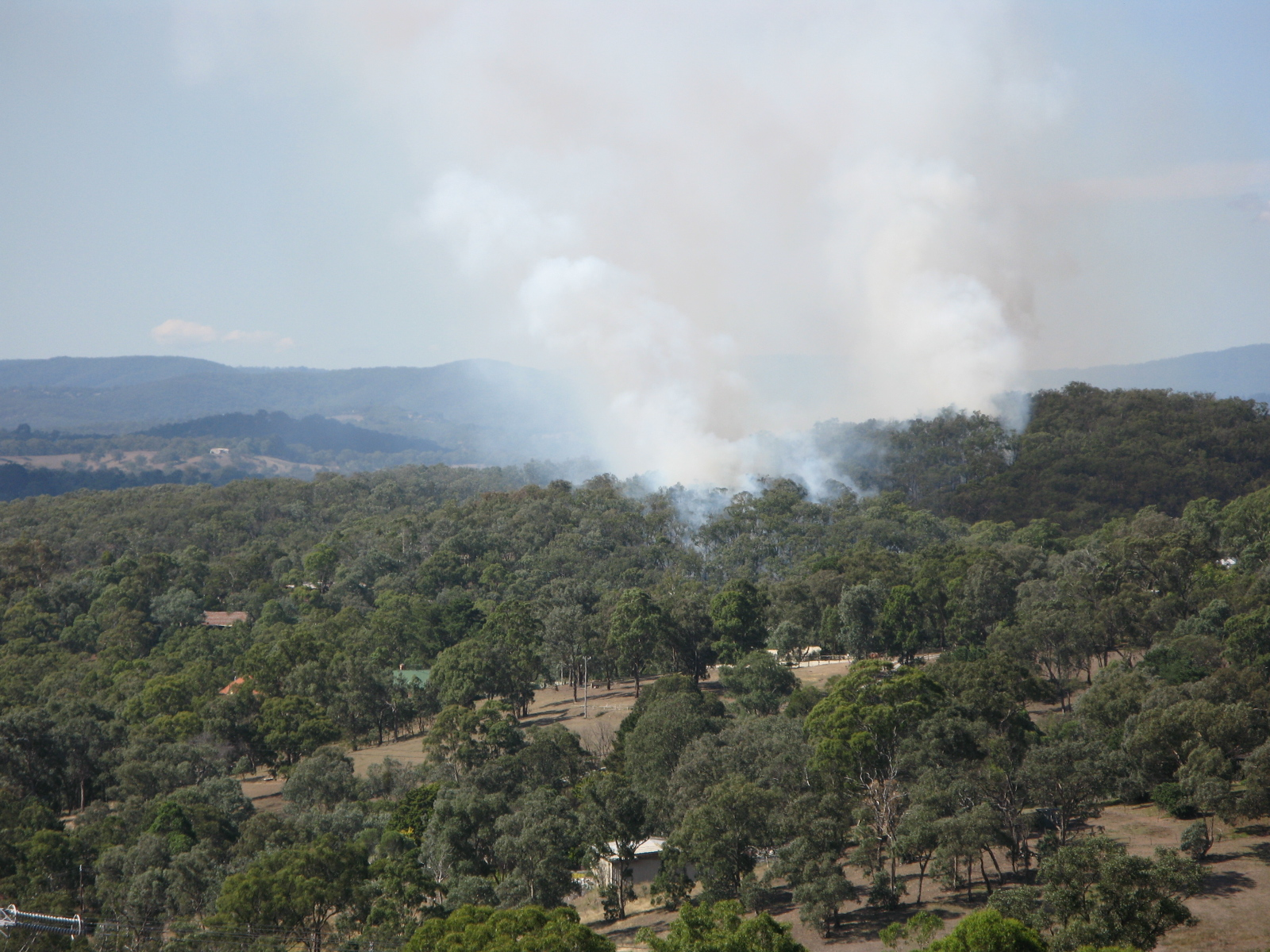
Controlled burning in the state park around Fourth Hill, 2008

- Fourth Hill - access to the fourth hill area can be made via various sealed and unsealed streets branching from Yarra Street.
- Tunnel Street

== Regulations ==
- No dogs, cats or firearms.
- Fires to be lit only in fireplaces provided.
- Horse riding only on designated tracks.
- No digging for worms on the river bank.
- Prospecting is permitted in the bed of Anderson's Creek with non-mechanical tools only.

It is also advised that visitors:

- Keep to walking tracks, as many partly hidden mine shafts dot the hills.
- Tracks in Whipstick Gully can be steep and slippery in wet weather. Historic gold sites are protected.
- Drone use requires a permit

== See also ==
- Protected areas of Victoria
- Pound Bend Tunnel
- Victorian gold rush
