= Reg Preston =

Australian artist (1917–2000)

Reg Preston (18 March 1917– 14 June 2000) studied sculpture at the Westminster School of Art in London, in 1938. At the beginning of WW2, he returned to Australia and spent three months in 1944 potting at the Melbourne Technical College with John A. Barnard Knight and Klytie Pate. Throughout 1945–1946, he worked at Cooper and Cooke's Pottery.

In 1947, he established a pottery studio at Warrandyte and worked full-time as a freelance potter. To make a living, he produced a range of domestic wares like coffee mugs, as well as larger decorative pieces like bowls and vases. In 1958, Preston and his wife, Phil Dunn, set up the Potters’ Cottage at Warrandyte, Victoria, with Gus McLaren, Charles Wilton, and Artur Halpern.

Throughout this time, he continued to work in earthenware. For some time, he was also interested in working with the English slipware tradition and was also interested in using Aboriginal motifs. During the 1960s, Preston and Dunn produced a line under the name "Ceres", and Preston and McLaren also produced a line under the name 'Regus'. In 1967, Preston began working in stoneware. Preston is perhaps best known for his work in stoneware, often large pieces with bold, abstract decorations, and his lidded shaped pieces with rich vitreous glazes over-poured or brushed with other metallic glazes. He worked well into the 1980s, producing often large pieces with rich glazes and bold abstract decoration.

Of his own work Reg Preston once said: "I quite simply make pots that please me. They are derived from a number of factors, the clay itself, the firing, other pots from other ages; these factors have over the years of work been gradually assimilated and become unconscious. The best ideas for me come from pots and from long bouts of continuous work. I find continuity of thought about the pots that I'm making day to day to be the time that is most fruitful. Occasionally when all the thought about the process, the technical knowledge merge and become one, then days later you might get from the kiln one or two pots that stand as it were 'on their own legs' detached and quite apart."(Reg Preston, 'Recent Ceramics, an exhibition from Australia', 1980).

Preston went on to become an acknowledged master and has pieces in collections such as the Powerhouse and Qut museums.
