= Les Tanner =

Political cartoonist, artist (1927–2001)

Les Tanner (15 June 1927 – 23 July 2001) was an Australian cartoonist and journalist.

== Life ==
Les Tanner was born in Redfern, Sydney. He began drawing at the age of five, went to school at Glebe Primary School and North Newtown Intermediate High. As a child he appeared in a number of films including comedian George Wallace's Gone to the Dogs, Our Gang, an RTA commercial co-starring Gloria Dawn and Forty Thousand Horsemen. He began his career at The Daily Telegraph in 1942, as a printer's devil. Soon transferred to the press artists room, he worked under the mentorship of Senior Artist Frank Broadhurst and William Edwin Pidgeon, (a.k.a. WEP) a three-time Archibald Prize winner, and later Illustrator Tommy Hughes. At eighteen, Tanner was sent to Japan by the editor Brian Penton to work at BCON – the Occupation Force Newspaper – as a cartoonist and journalist. Pidgeon had introduced him to the works of Hokusai and other ukiyo-e artists, including Utamaro; and much of Tanner's spare time and staff sergeant's pay was spent buying as many woodblock prints as he could whilst there. It was in Japan, that Les Tanner also met his lifelong friend and fellow artist, Gus McLaren, when he was sent to interview him about his role in teaching art to the Japanese in Osaka.

On his return to Australia, Tanner joined the A.M. Magazine as an illustrator before returning to The Daily Telegraph and Sunday Telegraph, where he had his first assignment as a political cartoonist. His popularity grew and he was soon cartooning a week in review page each week, as well as being daily cartoonist. He later became Art Director at The Bulletin. When he drew a controversial cartoon of Sir Henry Bolte, then premier of Victoria, to illustrate Editor Peter Coleman's article against capital punishment, Sir Frank Packer pulped the entire edition of the magazine. Packer had not thought about the airmail delivery of this edition to Melbourne, where the following morning it appeared on the news stands at Flinders Street. Nor had he thought about subscription copies, so that many regular readers received the magazine despite his best efforts. Packer went on to ban a BBC television program on capital punishment due to air on GTV-9 – one of Packer's own television stations on 31 January 1967. But the cartoon and editorial achieved even greater prominence in the public domain when ABC television ran a story on it and the banned Channel 9 program that night, under the banner of censorship of the press, much to the glee of both Tanner and Coleman. Throughout the fifties and sixties, Tanner was one of the few cartoonists of the era to regularly highlight the plight of the Indigenous Australians in Australia. As an advocate for social justice in all its forms, Tanner enjoyed challenging racism head on because it so offended him. He was never afraid to challenge the inequities of society and felt a moral obligation as a commentator to highlight them.

At the Daily Telegraph, Tanner not only drew his caricatures but often produced clay model caricatures, which were then photographed to immortalise the faces of such notables as Joseph Stalin and Sir Robert Menzies. When photographers could not get to Maitland to cover the infamous floods, Tanner was also airlifted in to draw the scenes- much to his chagrin.

Les Tanner won the 'Most promising new cartoonist of the year' award in London in 1960 whilst working for the Daily Sketch, followed by two Walkley Awards in Australia in 1962 and 1965 respectively. Back in Australia, he took his early interest in clay modelling to new heights, producing several tongue in cheek busts of Sir Robert Menzies.

When Graham Perkin Editor of The Age newspaper in Melbourne offered him the position of Chief Political Cartoonist, Tanner agreed and for the next thirty years until he retired in 1997, he satirized politicians and gained a large fan base for his efforts. Once in Melbourne and in collaboration with Gus and Betty McLaren, Tanner produced a series of toby jugs of Sir Robert Menzies, as well as a nice line in Sir Henry Bolte mugs- examples of which can be found at The National Portrait Gallery in Canberra. Loyal fans also flocked to his popular Saturday column "Tanner with Words".

In 1999, Tanner received a 'Golden Quill Award' for 'Lifetime Achievement in the Arts'. Apart from a prolific career as a cartoonist, Tanner co-wrote several books on black and white art. He made an animated film called Letter to a Vandal and was an actor and set designer for the New Theatre from 1946 until 1955. In 1986, he worked as a voice coach for Sir Donald Pleasence for the film Ground Zero, which starred Colin Friels. Pleasence's character in the movie was a scientist who had contracted throat cancer, following British nuclear tests at Maralinga. Tanner, a throat cancer sufferer, was pleased to help Pleasence learn to operate a Servox speech aid for his role.

After his death, the Black and White Society of Australia described him as follows: "Les Tanner was pre-eminent as a social commentator in the medium of black and white art in 20th Century Australia."
