= Warrandyte High School =

Coordinates: 37°44′49″S 145°11′03″E

- Warrandyte, VIC; Australia

Information
- Type: Public
- Motto: Excellence Integrity Respect
- Established: 1978
- Principal: Luke Ventieri
- Enrolment: 400~
- Campus: Warrandyte
- Colours: Navy blue, red, white
- Website: warrandytehigh.vic.edu.au

Warrandyte High School (WHS) is a high school in Warrandyte, Victoria, Australia. Established as only a few portable classrooms in 1978, it now comprises two main buildings and many semi-permanent portables set on a hillside on the southern slopes of the Yarra River, west of the main township of Warrandyte. The majority of its 400 students live in Warrandyte and the surrounding region. The school is known primarily for its art and music curriculum and natural setting. It has a long history of annual musical theatre productions.

== History ==
Warrandyte High School was created in 1978 with 43 students, initially the hillside was quite bare as new vegetation was planted, this initial planting has since matured and created the dense vegetation that surrounds the school today. The first permanent buildings were built in 1987. When the Triennial Review in 1994 was completed, the school enrolment was 490. In 2000, enrolment reached 691 and by 2003 it was around 750 where it remains as of 2008. Around 389 students currently attend Warrandyte High School as of 2020.

=== 2004 development ===
From 2002-2004 a number of construction works were undertaken. A library extension/VCE study area (a project with a budget of $260,000) was undertaken and completed during 2004. $100,000 of locally raised funds were committed to the project together with a grant of $85,000 through the Department of Education and Training, as well as $77,000 from the ICT Modernization Project.

There were also a number of modifications to the school's grounds. The outdoor sports complex (now the Michael J. Blake Sports Complex) was completed and opened by Judy Green. The school's canteen was extended and renovated. The Federation Garden Project was completed with the planting of a Bush Tucker Garden. The top driveway and bus bay were sealed, the gardens surrounding it landscaped and a new school sign erected on the corner of Alexander and Warrandyte Road. New indigenous garden areas at the front of the school and between the portable classrooms were planted. Large shade sails were also erected over the outdoor amphitheatre.

=== Holly's Heroes ===
In 2004, the school was used as a filming location for 13 episodes of the Nine Network Australia's television series Holly's Heroes. The show has a basketball backdrop and follows the life of 14-year-old Holly McKenzie. It explored themes of friendship and the rewards that came from participation and the love of sport. It takes place in Woolich High, a high school on Phillip Island. Most filming took place in the basketball stadium with special lighting mounted on the changing room roof and camera rails along the floor. Filming also took place on the external basketball courts. Involvement with the film industry brought a sense of excitement and curiosity along the way offering students opportunities to participate as paid or unpaid extras. The whole experience provided the students with an insight into the film and television industry.

In 2013, it was revealed that the Nine Network was considering a second season of Holly's Heroes, also using Warrandyte High School as a location. This season would follow Holly McKenzie's return to Woolich High to coach the basketball team.

Early in 2020, Channel Nine announced a reboot of Holly’s Heroes to be filmed at Warrandyte High School. It would be shot from the perspective of Holly’s daughter. Former student Mitchell Gaffney was set to play the role of Holly’s husband. Unfortunately, due to the COVID-19 crisis, production was halted indefinitely.

== Other information ==
There is no year level camp, other than a Year 7 camp, annual music camps and a Year 11 trip to Kakadu. In Year 9 students taking part in the Taking the Challenge program travel to various significant landmarks around Melbourne and spend 2 nights in the CBD at the end of the program. WHS has a sister school, Hazu High School, in Japan. The school hosts several orchestras and ensembles and has a long history involving music and theatre (see "Extracurricular activities").

School sport competitions are divided into 4 houses: Newman (Yellow or Purple), Stiggant (Blue), Anderson (Green), and Michel (Red).

== Facilities ==
The school has two outdoor basketball courts, four tennis courts and a football/cricket oval with cricket nets. The school has a separate building for art and design including two dark rooms, two art studios, design studio (Used for wood, metal, plastic and more) it also has a visual design studio. School buildings are organised alphabetically in the order that they were built:

- A Block – administration, theatre, music rooms, indoor sports stadium and facilities (1980s)
- B Block – art and design studios (1980s)
- C Block – general classrooms (1980s)
- D Block – semi-permanent portable classrooms language rooms (1990s)
- E Block – semi-permanent portable classrooms (2000s)

== Location ==
See: Warrandyte

Warrandyte is situated in the outer north-eastern suburbs of Melbourne, 27 km east-north-east of the Melbourne central business district. Warrandyte was founded as a Victorian town during the Victorian gold rush, and is now generally considered part of greater Melbourne. The nearest major suburbs are Ringwood to the east and Eltham to the north. The catchment area for Warrandyte High School is extremely wide, with students coming from as far as Christmas Hills, Panton Hill, Alexandria, Healesville and Hurstbridge. Kinetic Melbourne, Panorama Coaches and Ventura Bus Lines all provide public transport to and from the school.

== Extracurricular activities ==
=== Theatre ===
The school is known for its yearly musical productions featuring students and occasionally staff members, which have run since 1983. The productions are notable for the high level of professionalism by the students. A dedicated theatre was built in 1987, the second-largest school theatre in the region. Chris White directed twenty productions between 1983 and 2004.

Some of the shows performed include It's Showtime, Shrek the Musical Jr., Young Frankenstein, We Will Rock You and The Little Mermaid.
