= Andersons Creek =

Creek in Victoria, Australia

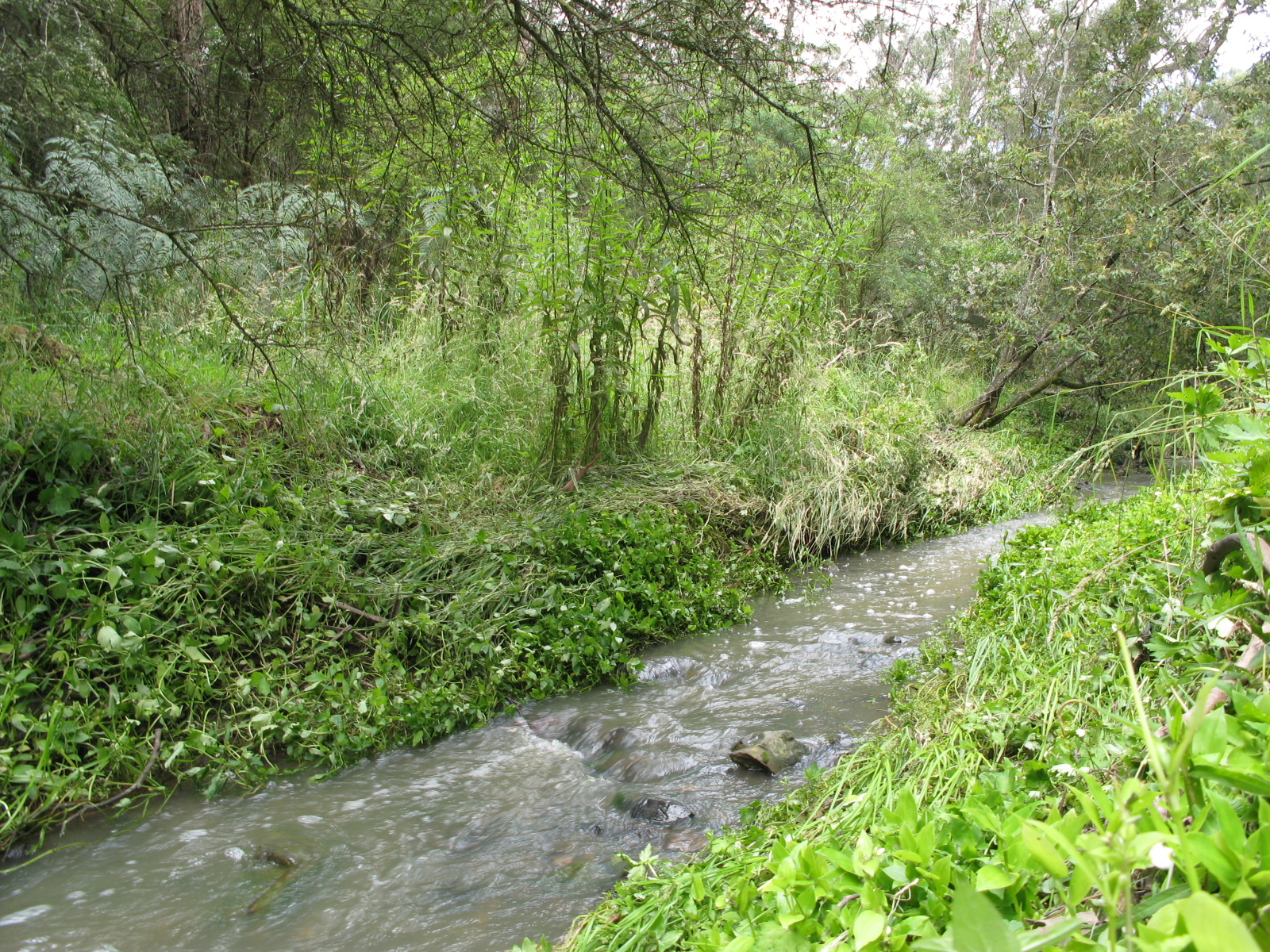
- Andersons Creek through Warrandyte

- Location of Andersons Creek mouth in Victoria

Location
- Country: Australia
- State: Victoria
- LGA: City of Maroondah; City of Manningham
- City: Melbourne

Physical characteristics
- Mouth: confluence with the Yarra River
  - location: Warrandyte
  - coordinates: 37°44′29″S 145°12′28″E
  - elevation: 36 m (118 ft)
- Length: 7 km (4.3 mi)
- Discharge
  - location: mouth

Basin features
- River system: Port Phillip catchment

Andersons Creek is a creek in Warrandyte and Park Orchards, east of Melbourne, Victoria, Australia. It is a tributary of the Yarra River. For tens of thousands of years it was used as a food and tool source sustainably by the Wurundjeri people, Aboriginal Australians of the Kulin nation, who spoke variations of the Woiwurrung language group.

The creek begins in the hills north of Ringwood on the boundary of urban metropolitan Melbourne from where it flows for roughly 2–3 km through Park Orchards and around 4 km through Warrandyte, before emptying into the Yarra River. The creek is relatively uninhibited by weirs, dams or reservoirs and it floods often after heavy rain. It provides habitat for significant species, which include: platypus, rakali, koalas, powerful owls, rufous night herons, white-winged choughs and yellow-tailed black cockatoos.

In June 1851 gold was first discovered in Victoria on the banks of Andersons Creek at Fourth Hill in the present day Warrandyte State Park by a small group led by Louis John Michel; the township of Warrandyte was initially named after the creek. Gold can still be found in the creek, and panning is permitted in a small section with a Miners Right.

== Geography ==
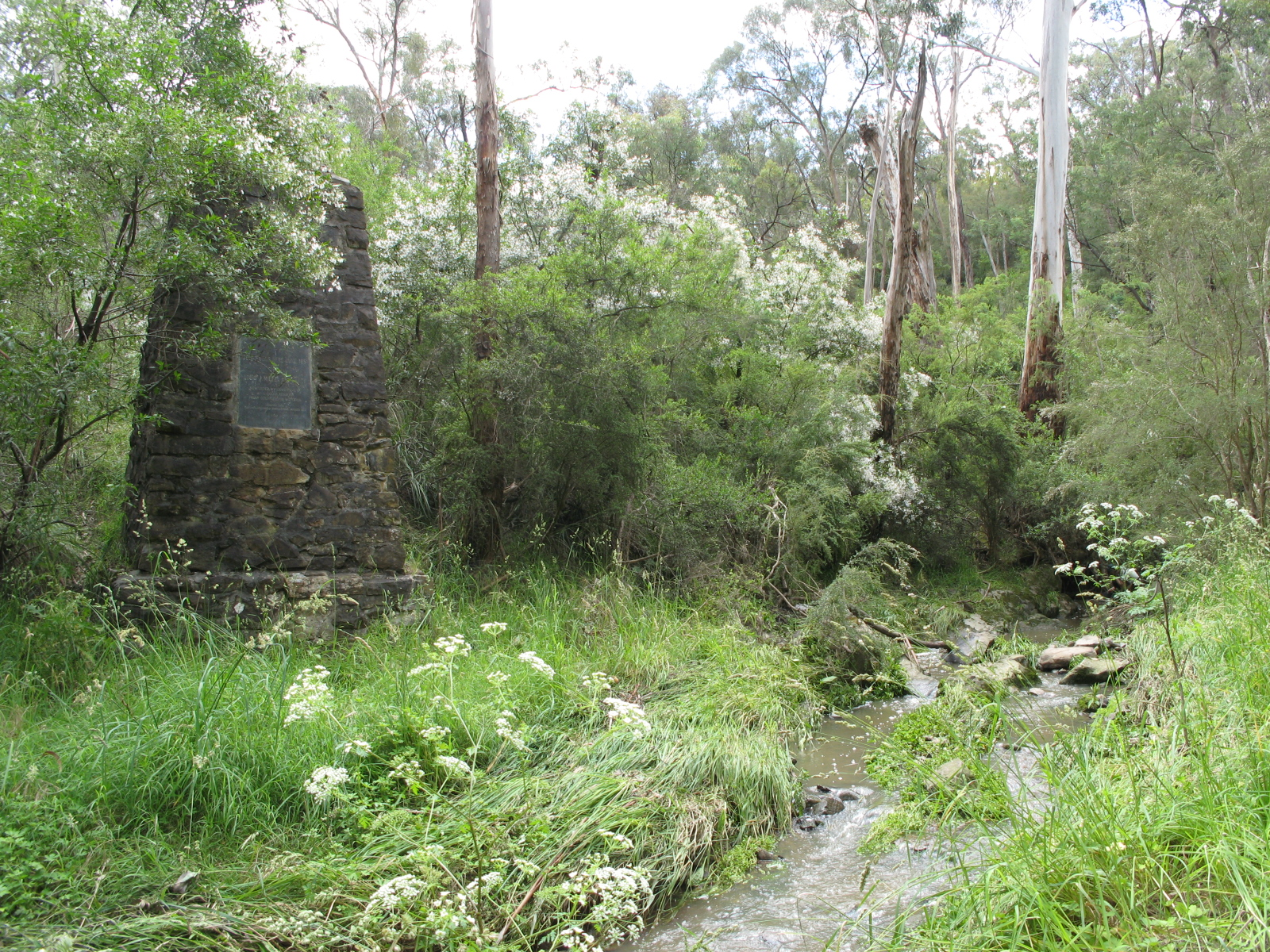
The cairn marking the site of the first recognised discovery of gold in Victoria, Australia in 1851 at Andersons Creek

Tributaries and surrounding geographic features include, upstream to downstream:

- Unnamed Creek
- Fourth Hill
- Unnamed Creek
- Beauty Gully
- Harris Gully
- Melbourne Hill
- Yarra River

== See also ==
- Victorian gold rush
