= Ringwood and District Cricket Association =

The Ringwood and District Cricket Association (or, better known as the RDCA) is a club cricket competition based in the outer eastern suburbs of Melbourne, Victoria. The competition consists of 31 clubs based around the Ringwood area of Melbourne and has been running seasonally since its induction in 1920/21 season.

In the 2006/07 season, the Association consisted of 32 grades ranging from Under 12's through to Veteran and Master classes. In addition, the RDCA also operate non-competitive grades in both Under 10 and Under 12 levels to assist in the development of the game.

In senior competition, Division 1 is known as the Lindsay Trollope Shield, Division 2 as the Wilkins Cup and Division 3 as the Newey Plate. These three divisions are composed predominantly of the first eleven of each club. Lower sides compete in a grading system from A Grade to M grade.

Prior to the 2010/11 season, Division 1 was known as the Chandler Shield. The name was changed to the Lindsay Trollope Shield between seasons at the RDCA AGM in August 2010 in recognition of his contributions to the RDCA for many years.

== Clubs ==
=== Locations ===
Locations of the 2024/25 RDCA clubs. Red indicates clubs with their 1st XI in Lindsay Trollope Shield, orange indicates Bill Wilkins Cup, yellow indicates Stuart Newey Plate, green indicates other Premier 1 grades, blue indicates Premier 2 grades and purple indicates District 1 grades (Note: Boronia only fields their 4th XI in the RDCA)

=== Current clubs ===
- Ainslie Park Cricket Club
- Bayswater Park Cricket Club
- Boronia Cricket Club
- Chirnside Park Cricket Club
- Croydon Cricket Club
- Croydon North Cricket Club
- Croydon Ranges Cricket Club
- East Ringwood Cricket Club
- Eastfield Cricket Club
- Healesville Cricket Club
- Heatherdale Cricket Club
- Heathwood Cricket Club
- Kilsyth Cricket Club
- Lilydale Cricket Club
- Montrose Cricket Club
- Mooroolbark Cricket Club
- Mount Evelyn Cricket Club
- North Ringwood Cricket Club
- Norwood Cricket Club
- Ringwood Cricket Club
- Scoresby Cricket Club
- Seville Cricket Club
- South Croydon Cricket Club
- South Warrandyte Cricket Club
- St Andrews Cricket Club
- Templeton Cricket Club
- Wantirna Cricket Club
- Wantirna South Cricket Club
- Warrandyte Cricket Club
- Warranwood Cricket Club
- Wonga Park Cricket Club

=== Former clubs ===
- Academy Cricket Club
- Aquinas Cricket Club
- Bayswater Cricket Club
- Bayswater North Cricket Club
- Boronia Churches Cricket Club
- Boronia United Cricket Club
- Croydon High School Cricket Club
- Croydon Hockeyers Cricket Club
- Croydon United Cricket Club
- East Ringwood United Churches Cricket Club
- Eley Park Cricket Club
- Ferntree Gully Cricket Club
- Glen Park Cricket Club
- Heathmont Uniting Cricket Club
- Johnson Park Cricket Club
- Knox Churches Cricket Club
- Knox City Cricket Club
- Knox Gardens Cricket Club
- Knoxfield Cricket Club
- Mooroolbark Baptists Cricket Club
- Olinda Cricket Club
- Park Orchards Cricket Club
- Parkwood Cricket Club
- Ringwood Footballers Cricket Club
- Ringwood RSL Cricket Club
- Ringwood Uniting Cricket Club
- Riversdale Cricket Club
- Ruskin Park Cricket Club
- South Ringwood Cricket Club
- St Stephens Cricket Club
- The Basin Salvation Army Cricket Club
- Valley Cricket Club
- Vermont Cricket Club
- Westwood Cricket Club
- Yarra Valley Cricket Club
