= Louis John Michel =

Australian gold prospector (1825–1904)

- Born: July 5, 1825; Walworth, Surrey, England
- Died: September 24, 1904 (aged 79)
- Occupations: Prospector, goldminer, local government official, publican
- Known for: First discovery of gold in Victoria, Australia

Louis John Michel (1825–1904) is the person of which the suburb of Melbourne named Warrandyte was formed upon. He is credited with the first discovery of gold in Victoria. Gold was first discovered in Warrandyte, Victoria at Andersons Creek in 1851. A cairn was erected in 1938 marking the spot.
