= Gus McLaren =

Australian artist, animator and potter

Gus McLaren (1923 – 29 August 2008) was an Australian artist, animator and potter.

Active duty in the Australian army during World War 2 saw Gus serving in the pacific. Here he painted panels for a recreation tent for wounded Australian and allied soldiers- the work now resides at the Australian War Memorial in Canberra. As part of the Occupation forces in 1946, Gus travelled to Japan to teach art to the Japanese and there he met and was interviewed by a young cartoonist, named Les Tanner who worked for BECON ( British and Allied Forces Newspaper). The friendship endured for the next fifty years, until Les Tanner's death in 2001. After the war, Gus returned to Sydney where he worked as a cartoonist and illustrator for the Daily Telegraph and Women's Weekly before moving home to Melbourne where he worked on The Argus newspaper, as the cartoonist "Just Gus". He began potting with Reg Preston in 1955 and was one of the founding members in 1958 of the Potters Cottage in Warrandyte, Victoria. He and his wife Betty McLaren, set up Yarraridge pottery and together and separately, the two produced an extensive body of work. This included wheel-thrown and hand-built pieces, as well as a range of slip-cast figures designed by Gus and decorated by Betty. These designs are still being used by Betty to make figures for sale from her McLaren Pottery on the New South Wales south coast.

Gus McLaren has ceramic works in both public and private collections. When the Potters Cottage held its 45th anniversary in 2003, he participated in the exhibition.

He also has a considerable body of work in animated films. In 1962 he directed the first animation series made for Australian television, Freddo the Frog and he was one of the animators who worked on Grendel, Grendel, Grendel, a full-length animated film retelling the Beowulf epic released in 1981.

Gus McLaren died in Merimbula on 29 August 2008.
