= Miner's Right =

The Miner's Right was introduced in 1855 in the colony of Victoria, replacing the Miner's Licence. Protests in 1853 at Bendigo with the formation of the Anti-Gold Licence Association and the rebellion of Eureka Stockade in December 1854 at Ballarat led to reform of the system with a lower annual fee of five shillings for the right to mine gold, the right to vote, and the right to own land. Previously, the mining licence cost eight pounds a year.

In Ballarat as at 1978 some houses were still held with the tenure associated with a miner's right.

Other Australian colonies and New Zealand soon replaced the licensing system with Miner's Rights also.

Miner's Rights are still sold in Victoria. A Miner's Right allows recreational fossickers to remove and keep minerals discovered on Crown Land, their own land or private land where the landowner has given permission within certain conditions. The cost as of July 2024 is $27.80 for 10 years.
