= Warrandyte Cricket Club =

Australian cricket club

Personnel
- Chief executive: Chris Rakuscek
- Manager: Justin Cleaves

Team information
- City: Taroona Avenue; Warrandyte; Victoria, Australia
- Colors: Cherry red & white
- Founded: 1855
- Home ground: Warrandyte Reserve #1; Stintons Reserve; Warrandyte Reserve #2

History
- First-class debut: vs Christmas Hills in 11 November 1905 at Warrandyte Reserve
- Official website: warrandytecc.com

Established in 1855, the Warrandyte Cricket Club is located in the eastern suburbs of Victoria, Australia, and is the 3rd oldest active cricket club in the state. Social games were played at the Recreation Reserve in Andersons Creek (now Warrandyte) against neighbouring suburbs until the club entered the Cameron Cricket Association, playing its first game in competition on 11 November 1905 against Christmas Hills. Season 2010/11 was the club's 100th in competition (taking into account war periods and club disputes), and during that time over 1,300 people have played in either juniors, seniors, women's or veterans grades. The club currently competes in the Ringwood and District Cricket Association (RDCA)

== History ==
=== Cricket on the goldfields (1855 – 1904) ===
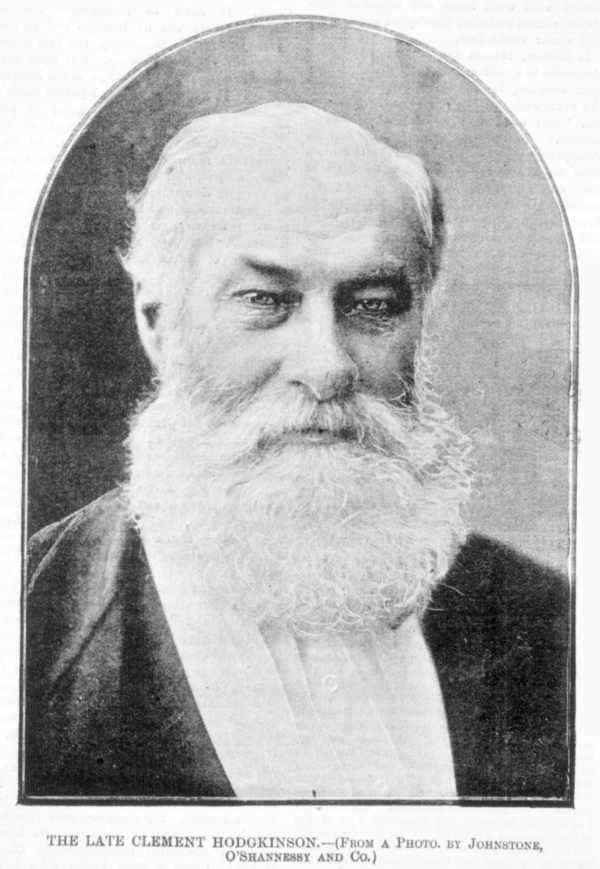
Clement Hodgkinson

In February 1855, 4 years after gold was first discovered in the town, the noted early Victorian politician William Westgarth paid a visit to Warrandyte, or Anderson's Creek as the town was then frequently called. He described the village as a small mining camp stretched along about a mile of the riverbank. The number of miners did not exceed two hundred in all. A punt was established across this river, a Post Office was established, a Mining Warden was appointed, and the Lands Department has also got a map surveyed by Clement Hodgkinson which shows a ground used for cricket on the present site of the Recreation Ground.

A number of pioneers of Warrandyte took a keen interest in cricket, but two in particular, Walter Charles Brackenbury and William Collins, stand out as founders of the game in Warrandyte. The earliest found match documentation was from 9 January 1864, when Bells Life in Victoria printed the complete scores of a match between Andersons Creek and Caledonia (now St Andrews), and many noted early residents took part including James Masterton, who got five wickets in each innings. Masterton owned a rich mining claim almost opposite the Old Catholic Church in Brackenbury Street. In 1856 he caused quite a stir in the Melbourne Argus when he found 12oz. of gold in a tub of quartz. Others who took part were the Squires brothers who ran the Grocers Shop in the Main Street for 40 years, which it is now the Foodlands Store, Stiggants the pioneer orchardist on Pound Road, while Ewen Hugh Cameron who later represented the district in Parliament for 40 years took two wickets for Caledonia. Anderson's Creek won a brilliant victory scoring 114 to their opponents 26 and 36.

KANGAROO GROUND V. ANDERSON'S UNITED
The return match of the above clubs was played on Saturday last on the ground of the latter, at Watsons Creek, and resulted in an easy win for the United team. The weather was all that could be desired. The visitors went to the wicket first, and were soon disposed of for the small score of 26 runs. After a substantial lunch had been partaken of (and a few facetious remarks passed by a facetious stranger), the United team went in to try their powers and when the last man was declared out had made the large score of 103 runs, much to the dismay of their opponents. J.Cummings and Shaw making 52 and 18 respectively. The Kangarooites then went in to try and pull up lost ground, but, although they played with good spirit and made a better stand than in their first innings, they could not catch up to their opponents. The match resulted in a win for the locals by one innings and 30 runs.

— Evelyn Observer and South and East Bourke Record – Friday 1 December 1882

On 15 June 1864, the club applied to the Government for a permanent recreation ground. Their petition was presented by the then Mining Warden Charles Warburton Carr, and the club was granted permissive occupancy, but this was not very suitable as they were worried that the ground might be used for building purposes, and a second petition was presented on behalf of the club by Mr. W.Watkins M.L.A. in 1866.

A permanent recreation ground was then gazetted and the first trustees were appointed on 10 September 1866. They were Dr. John Elmes, Walter Pretty, William Collins, Arthur Liddlelow and Thomas Porteus. William Collins, who was a landscape gardener offered to give his services to beautify the ground, and in the early 1870s the club had a somewhat ambitious scheme to build a pavilion, fence and level the ground, and also build a bowling green. They applied to the Government for 150 Pounds towards the cost, but they got no more than a letter of acknowledgement.

During 1875 and 1876, the Trustees spent the sum of 7 Pounds 3 Shillings and 9 Pence on fencing and other improvements to the ground, but there is nothing to suggest that anything in the line of a permanent pavilion had been erected.

The finding of good Gold in the Mines could sometimes cause the club to renege on their obligations. On one occasion in the 1890s, a party of gentlemen from the Croydon Club came riding into town and claimed that they had arranged a match against the Warrandyte Club and there was no one to play them. They rode off in a huff. The Warrandyte Club apologised to them in the local press, but they never came back until 1910.

During the 1880s and 1890s, regular games were played against Kangaroo Ground, Ringwood, Yarra Flats, Eltham, Lilydale, with visits from the West End Brewery from Melbourne.

Many players mentioned in newspaper reports played a major part of forming the community in Warrandyte, and have has streets named after them like John Till, Edward Kruse, R.Mahoney, Henry Stiggants & John Speers, to name a few.

=== The Cameron Cricket Association (1905 – 1907) ===
John Till

THE CAMERON TROPHY ASSOCIATION
The first matches in connection with this competition commenced last Saturday afternoon.
In the match played at Warrandyte the scoring was low. Warrandyte, 1st innings, 34 C. Sanford 16 (not out) was the only batsman to reach double figures. 2nd innings 66, Wyatt and Forden, with 11 and 12 respectively, were the top scorers. Christmas Hills, 1st innings (batting one man short) 21; J. Kennedy being top scorer with 9. 2nd innings, 80 runs to win and all to bat. In bowling J. Till (for Warrandyte) did great execution, getting 6 wickets for 5 runs. At one stage he had 3 wickets for no runs and later 5 wickets for 2 runs. Hodgson, 1 for 12, was the other bowler. A. Hubbard (for Christmas Hills) was also deadly, and like Till started with 3 wickets for no runs. He finished the day with 11 for 33. J. Hubbard 4 for 15 and C. Cumberland 4 for 32 were the only other successful bowlers.
The following Saturday a change "came over the scene," as Christmas Hills, requiring 80 with an innings to go, secured the win with four wickets to spare. The visitors each day were treated to a nice luncheon by the ladies.

— Evelyn Observer and South and East Bourke Record – Friday 1 December 1905

At a public sports meeting on Saturday 14 October 1905 a club committee was formed, consisting of E.H.Cameron as president, Edwards Kruse as Secretary, and George Quick as treasurer. It was also put forward that the club join the Cameron Trophy Association, which comprised local clubs Christmas Hills, Kangaroo Ground, Caledonia & Panton Hill.

A month later on Saturday 18 November heralded the day the club played its first competitive cricket match, as they took on Christmas Hills at the Warrandyte Reserve. C.Sanford topped scored with 16, leading the team to a total of just 31, then captain John Till destroyed the opposition for just 21 runs, taking 6 for 5 in the process. Warrandyte fared better in their 2nd innings making 66, but Christmas Hills turned the tables the following week, and passed the target of 80 for the loss of 6 wickets.

Warrandyte would claim their first win the following game at Kangaroo Ground, with John Till again the star, top scoring with 45 and taking 9 wickets, including 5 in the opposition total of just 9 in the 2nd innings.

Till would show a liking to Kangaroo Ground's bowling in their return clash in round 7 at Warrandyte Reserve, scoring the club's first ever century, and the team finished their first season with 4 wins and 4 losses, narrowly losing the semi-final.

Warrandyte would go through the following season undefeated, winning most of their games by an innings. But without finals, the premiership decider would revert to the completion of an abandoned game in round 1 against new team Yarra Glen. The game resumed after the season was finished to decide the premiers, and with Warrandyte 7/65 in their second innings, with a lead of just 55 runs, it appeared all the domination would amount to nothing. Resuming the game on 23 March 1907, Warrandyte's tail added another 19 runs, but this would prove crucial, as Yarra Glen were dismissed for just 67 in their 2nd innings, giving Warrandyte its first ever premiership by 8 runs.

Earliest reference to women's cricket was noted on the ANA holiday back on 24 January 1906, when after the men played the visiting Carlton team, a ladies game was held. The locals victorious 29 runs to 19.

=== The Box Hill Reporter District Cricket Association (1908 – 1932) ===
Warrandyte were forced to not play in season 1907/08 after the Cameron Cricket Association disbanding due to lack of participating teams, so the club approached the Box Hill Reporter District Cricket Association in September 1908. They were initially refused entry because of the opposition clubs reluctance to travel to Warrandyte, due to its remoteness at the time, however they were accepted on 2 October on the proviso they play all their games at opposition grounds. Only Blackburn made the long trek out to Warrandyte.

The step up in the standard of cricket was evident, even in the B Grade, with the club struggling against strong seasoned teams like Blackburn, Box Hill, Croydon, Doncaster, East Burwood, Ringwood & Templestowe. Most of whom have been playing since the competition started in 1890. One highlight was Thomas Schubert taking 9/17 against Templestowe in 1909, a club record that would stand until 1996, and still the best bowling figures ever at Warrandyte Reserve. The team would struggle up until World War I, but that period saw the debuts of 100 game players Les Till (John's son), Jack & William Colman, Les, Richard & Bill McCulloch and William Moore.

The post war era coincided with a coming of age, as the club dominated B Grade. Season 1920/21 saw them win the premiership against Blackburn 2nd XI, and the first game of one of the club's greatest players, James Schubert, who still remains the only player to score 4,000 runs and take 400 wickets.

William Colman scored 468 runs and took 90 wickets in 1922/23, which is still a record for most wickets & points in a single season.

They also spasmodically fielded a 2nd XI of their own for the first time in 1925/26, while the 1st XI yo-yoed between A and B Grade.

Despite the advent of the automobile in the 1920s, most locals couldn't afford one, and were forced to travel to and from grounds by either bicycle or on the back of Horrie Smith's orchard truck.

For reasons not entirely clear, the club had to field its 2nd XI in the Ringwood and District Cricket Association's C Grade in 1931/32, probably due again to the distance to Warrandyte issue for opposition clubs. The reserve team lost the final, coincidentally against newly formed South Warrandyte Cricket Club's 1st XI, which from formed by Jack Colman, who played 116 games in his 18 years at the Warrandyte Cricket Club.

This period saw the first games of life members John Smith in 1921/22, Jack McAuley the following season, and Horrie Smith Jnr in 1926/27.

=== The Ringwood and District Cricket Association (1932 – 1948) ===
The following season in 1932/33, the 1st XI also joined the RDCA, where the reserve team won its first flag in 1993/34. The club attended the association's AGM in October 1934, but were missing from the fixture a month later, and returned to the BHRDCA for one season. Then according to the Box Hill Reporter newspaper on 30 August 1935, once again they were refused entry at the AGM due to "inaccessibility", so it was back to the RDCA. 1936/37 saw the 1sts claim its first RDCA premiership, on the back of fearful fast bowler Fred Carlton's 90 wickets and 2 competition bowling awards in 2 seasons.

1 October 1938 was a red letter day in the club's history, when a 15-year-old Allan Chapman played his first game. Although being run out for just 1 at Wonga Park wasn't memorable, his legacy at the club would become indelible. He is roundly touted by those in the know as the club's greatest ever player, winning an unprecedented 7 first eleven Club Championships, and playing 1st XI cricket until the age of 48. The Chapman name would become synonymous with Warrandyte cricket, with 14 in total playing for the club, including 5 Life Members and grandson Matthew, who still plays today. Two games later another legend debuted, with Les Adams beginning his 35-year association with the club.

Following two of the brightest moments was possibly its darkest, when on 13 January 1939, the Black Friday bush fires ravaged the town, destroying the clubrooms and all its equipment and memorabilia in its wake. Tragically former player Fred Topping perished defending his home. With help from The Victorian Cricket Association donating equipment, the club rebuilt and remarkably went on to win both the B and C Grade premierships in 1939/40. The 1st XI beat North Bayswater 205 & 153 to 129 & 166, while the 2nd XI easily defeated Ringwood 116 & 1/38 to 58 & 94.

The club had a 3 1/2-year hiatus during the WW2 period, and returned to once again dominate the competition in B Grade, going undefeated until their shock loss to East Ringwood in the semi-final. The promotion to A Grade saw them struggle again, and a return to B Grade in 1947/48 saw the 1st XI claim its 3rd flag in 12 seasons. The winning team consisted of Allan, Arthur, Adrian & Colin Chapman, Stan Houghton, Jim Lee, Jack McAuley, Clive & George Smith, Horace Smith Junior and Senior, and is one of the greatest to ever take the field for Warrandyte.

=== Turbulent times (1949 – 1960) ===
Despite being reigning premiers, the club took the extraordinary decision not to play at all the following season due to a disagreement on the captaincy. And when they reformed 1949/50, it was once again in the Box Hill league under the new name of West Warrandyte, which they kept for 5 seasons.

New Years Day in 1956 was a momentous day for the club, as 2,000 spectators filled the Warrandyte Reserve to watch a game against the Victoria Cricket Association at the Warrandyte Reserve to celebrate the club's centenary. After a few postponements due to weather, many local dignitaries attended, and the V.C.A. team consisted of four former Australian test cricketers. On the following Saturday, Centenary Ball was held in the Warrandyte Mechanic Institute and it proved another fine success. The members went to considerable trouble to decorate the hall in the club colours, green and gold and at the rear of the hall was the club birthday Cake with 100 blazing candles. The highlight of the evening was the presentation of the first Life Membership medallion to Jack Moore by Councillor William F. Betton, who paid a tribute to his fine services to the people of Warrandyte both on and off the sporting field.

Back row (L-R) Bill Betton (president), Graham Pike, Bill Taberner, Graham West, Ken Sargeant, Robert Stewart, Les Adams (manager)
Front row (L-R) Henrique Harding, Peter Adams, Glen Martin (C), Boyd Ewing, Laurie Warr The celebrations continued the following season, when the 1st XI claimed the B Grade premiership in 1956/57 under the captaincy of Colin Chapman. The 'Dytes winning a tough contest against St Peters, 146 & 201 versus 130 & 201. That season also featured the introduction of the club's first ever junior side, an under 16s team.

For the first time since the club dispute, the Warrandyte failed to produce a 2nd XI the following season, which created differing opinions on team selection. This disharmony saw Morrie Bennett, who had played a handful of games, create the North Warrandyte Cricket Club which played in the RDCA. Its future was promising, but was forced to finally abandon after just 3 seasons, due largely to the fact that the Eltham Council was unable to build the club a ground due to the hilly terrain of the area.

Warrandyte was in a dire financial situation, mainly due to the centenary commitments, so major changes were needed. Under the vision of new president of William Betton, a yearly Tradesman's Directory was introduced, which after a few years became a great money spinner for the club, and is still in operation today. They also established an under 16s team in 1958/59, and by 1960/61 changed its name to Warrandyte Footballers, and its colours from green and gold to red and white.

=== Struggling years (1961 – 1977) ===
With most players returning from the failed North Warrandyte venture for the 1961/62 season, the club also began to see the fruits of its junior team when it fielded a 3rd eleven for the first time in 1963/64. One junior, Mark Davis, who would go on to be president and a Life Member, amassed a stunning 142 in the under 14s competition in 1965. But despite the growing numbers, the depth of quality in the 1st XI was lacking, and they failed to make the finals in every season in the 1960s.

Regardless of the lack of team success, there were many momentous occasions & personal highlights. After a career span of 35 years, Allan Chapman played his 163rd and final game in the 2nd XI's semi final loss in 1973. An even greater time span was Jack McAuley's who played his last game on 13 January 1968, nearly 46 years to the day after his debut on 21 January 1922. That was a record that stood until Allan Chapman's son, John, graduated from the juniors in 1963, and brought up 50 years at the club playing veterans in 2011/12. His father-in-law, Les Adams, ended a 35-year stint, playing his last game in 1974, while his son, Peter, won an amazing 6 consecutive 1st XI bowling awards in the 1960s. And Robert White, a talented all round sportsman, joined the club in 1970, and would go on to be the leading run scorer in the 1st XI, as well as holding two stints as president.

Back row (L-R) Sandra Burton, Debbie Lamb, Maria McGhee, Marg World, Robyn Dalli, Teresa Prince
Front row (L-R) Sandra Jeffs, Jenny Chapman, Suzanne Chapman (captain), Jenni McLaws, Judith Davis Season 1975/76 saw some big changes. The club rejoined the RDCA and the Women's XI, not seen since the start of the 20th century, was re-established. Their success was instant, winning the Victorian Women's Cricket Association premiership in its first attempt, thus ending the club's longest ever premiership drought. Instrumental in its creation and success were sisters Susanne & Jenny Chapman, and the team would go on to play until 1992/93.

=== The golden era (1977 – 1985) ===
Steve Pascoe, a talented all-rounder, was recruited from the Norwood Cricket Club as the first ever captain/coach in the winter of 1977, and his professionalism and fore thinking was just what the club needed. When he arrived, the club had 3 junior and 3 senior teams, and in the space of just 6 seasons, playing numbers had doubled for both.

The quality of playing stocks also improved, recruiting players such as Bob McDonald, Richard Bowen, Fred Jungwirth and Marty McCarthy from junior ranks. Stan Davis, an influential member of the club, was an on-field tactician and leg spin bowler. Another important member, Bruce Kline, was a wicketkeeper who, while keeping up to the stumps to most bowlers, took 31 stumpings and just 6 catches in one season. 13-year-old Brett Kline was part of the under 14's premiers in 1977/78, and would go on to become the senior games record holder in 2011, while Gerald Walshe played his first senior game in October 1978. 30 seasons later Walshe would claim a record 644 senior wickets.

The foundation was laid for the 1979/80 season, one that goes down in the history books as the club's greatest. Stan Davis took over the reins of the first eleven, and led them to a long-awaited premiership. Bowling first, Jungwirth's 4/39 help dismiss Ainslie Park for just 124, which was passed for the loss of just 3 wickets, with John Chapman making 66. But a middle order collapse saw them lose 7/49, and with the final spread over 3 days, the game was far from won. But Max Summers and Stan Davis shared a last wicket stand of 83 to take the game away from the opposition, and they went on to win by 10 wickets. The club achieved its only senior trifecta, with the 2nd and 3rd elevens also victorious. And capping off the season, were victories to both under 12s sides that included future stars in Michael and Cameron Day, Colin Dorning, Tony Sturesteps, Darren Peters, Brendan Baker and Greg Creber.

Traditionally Warrandyte's 1st XI had always struggled when promoted to the highest grade, but much confidence was gained when they finished a credible 5th out of 14 teams in its first attempt in Chandler Shield, which at the time was one of the most revered and competitive in metropolitan Melbourne. But it was a C Grade clash that received the most attention, when the 3rd XI were decimated for 53 and 42 by an Eastfield 1st XI bowler that claimed 6/15 and 9/10. His name was Graeme Lloyd.

Lloyd was coming off two C Grade bowling awards in a row, and joined Warrandyte for the 1981/82 season, and went on to completely dominate the opposition. He claimed 66 wickets and won the Bill Dean Medal as the league's best player, the only time a Warrandyte player has won such an award at the highest level. He was instrumental in guiding the 1st XI to 3rd place on the ladder and finals, another first for the club. His batting however was quite the opposite. After a caught behind shout from a fast bowler, he removed his gloves and walked off. As the bemused umpire yelled out that he wasn't out, Graeme, who was halfway off the ground shouted over his shoulder, "Close enough for me". Captain Davis also had a stellar season, claiming 44 wickets himself and snatching the competition bowling award from Lloyd, whilst Robert White returned the club from a stint at District cricket, and averaged 80 with the bat.

Back row (L-R) John McCartin, Brett Kline, John Chapman, Bruce Kline, Richard Bowen, Fred Jungwirth, Stephen Peake, Mark Davis, Graeme Lloyd
Front row (L-R) Robert White, Ann Pascoe (scorer), Steve Pascoe, Geoff Day (President), Stan Davis (C), Dianne Gathercole (Secretary), Marty McCarthy. Warrandyte beat Croydon United in the semi-final, a team that had humbled them in the final round, and faced the top side Wantirna South in the Chandler Shield final. It was uncharted territories for both clubs, and it was Warrandyte that batted first and nervously crawled to 9/120. Steve Pascoe made 42 of them, before a pivotal last wicket stand of 70 between John McCartin and Stan Davis that would go down in folklore. Davis then claimed 5/33 to rout the opposition for 128, and give the club a 62 run first innings lead midway through the 3rd and final day. Warrandyte looked to then bat out the day and claim a comfortable win, but after collapsing to be all out for 96, Wantirna South had 25 overs to score 159 runs in fading light. Fielding was almost impossible as dark clouds closed in on the ground and infielders were forced to scream out the direction of the ball to outfielders unable to pick up its flight. Davis refused to appeal against the light, preferring to play the game out to a finish, and when the opposition finished on 8/131, Warrandyte prevailed by 28 runs, claiming their first ever top grade premiership.

Back row (L-R) Darren Peters, Colin Dorning (12th man), Wayne Amiguet, Graeme Jacobs, Fred Jungwirth, Bruce Kline, Graeme Lloyd
Front row (L-R) John Chapman, Steve Pascoe, John Salter, Robert White, Ann Pascoe (scorer), Marty McCarthy

After failing to reach the finals in their title defense, John Salter was recruited from district cricket as captain/coach in 1983/84. In one of the great batting line ups of all time, he scored a record 690 runs, while Graeme Jacobs, Robert White and Wayne Amiguet all scored 400 plus runs.

Graeme Lloyd was a one-man wrecking machine, taking a further 71 wickets, the most ever since 1922/23. Finishing on top the ladder at the end of the season, they cruised to the final where they defeated East Ringwood and claimed their second premiership in the top grade. Robert White had an excellent all-round game, scoring 84 out of the 304 team score, then took 5/60 with the ball, as East Ringwood fell 60 runs short.

The next season they finished 2nd on the back of Salter's record breaking 955 run season, and set up a second successive grand final when they amassed 5/316 in the semi-final. But East Ringwood caused a huge upset and passed the score 8 wickets down.

The loss brought the season to a premature close, and as it turned out, also ended the most successful era in the club's history. In just six seasons, 13 premierships were won. 7 senior, including 3 for the first eleven, and 6 in the juniors.

=== Rebuilding phase (1986 – 1994) ===
In 1985/86 the club lost their equivalent of Chappell, Lillee and Marsh, with Salter, Lloyd and Kline all departing the club. Despite record playing numbers, peaking with 15 teams in 1986/87, and the introduction of the veterans XI in 1988/89, the next few seasons saw the 1st XI languish in the bottom half of the ladder, but remained in Chandler Shield. Following a year where the highest ranked senior side was the 8th placed reserve side, John Sharman was recruited to the club as captain/coach in 1990/91. His work ethic on the training field rubbed off on the field, as the top 3 teams all made finals. Sharman also brought with him an array of talent, including determined opening batsman Andrew Hood, Campbell Horlock and all-rounder Harry Drysdale. And with the emergence of Warrandyte juniors Tony Sturesteps, Gerald Walshe and David Mooney, the 1st XI were becoming competitive again, returning to the finals in 1992/93. They lost the semi-final to Ainslie Park, which would start one of the great RDCA rivalries. The next season, local fruit shop owner and former Australian test cricket Rodney Hogg was talked into rolling the arm over again. Despite being 42 years old at the time, was still extremely quick when in the mood, and terrorised many a batsman in his 2 seasons at Warrandyte.

After thrashing Wonga Park in the semi, they met Ainslie Park in the 1993/94 Chandler Shield Grand Final, which would twist and turn into the greatest RDCA final of all time. Scheduled for 3 days and 240 overs, Warrandyte batted first, as John Sharman's 64 runs pushed the score to a meagre total of 175 from 90 overs. With a day and a half day remaining, there was plenty of time, and when Ainslie Park got within 35 runs with 7 wickets in hand, they had one hand their first Chandler Shield. Then Hogg produced a tremendous spell of bowling, and sparked a collapse of 6/31 to end day 2 with the game well and truly in the balance. The final day began with Warrandyte needing 1 wicket, and Ainslie 5 runs for victory. The first over was a maiden bowled by Sturesteps, then Hogg sent a yorker into the stumps, and Warrandyte into delirium.

Hogg ended up with 7/33, all that was required was to bat out the remainder of the day to claim victory. But as only Warrandyte can, a shaky batting display opened the door, and the team were precariously at 7/77. A solid partnership recovered the damage to get to 7/113 with just 22 overs left in the match, but again the game changed, as the final 3 wickets fell in 3 overs. So Ainslie required 117 runs from 19 overs to reverse the result, and raced to 0/24 after the first 2. Then another twist, 2 quick wickets to Hogg and then a run out made it 3/34. The score reached 3/49 with 11 overs to play, when Hogg struck a batsman on the head with a bouncer, and an ambulance was required on the ground. Light was fading during the delay, and the umpires decided play couldn't recommence, so once again Warrandyte assumed the victory. But then more controversy, as RDCA officials announced play would continue on an unprecedented 4th day. So the players returned to the East Ringwood oval, and with a huge crowd in attendance, fortunes ebbed and flowed again until 7 runs were required from the final over with 5 wickets in hand. A bye from a disputed run out, a boundary, and finally a leg bye saw Ainslie Park reach the total, winning outright with 3 balls remaining of the 240th and last over. Warrandyte left to ponder how the lost a game they had already won

Hogg took another 35 wickets the following season, but the firsts struggled for runs after the departures of Sharman and his recruits. They failed to reach the finals, and spent the rest of the decade regularly staving off relegation. Three highlights stand out in the 90s. Two 1st XI records were broken when Chris Snaidero took all 10 wickets in an innings in February 1996, and David Mooney scored 184 not out in January 1997. While the 4th XI were the only Warrandyte team to win 3 premierships in a row.

Season 1996/97 was a tough one both on and off the field. Most teams languished around the bottom of the ladder, and the 5th XI couldn't field a side after Christmas. Diminishing player numbers also had a critical effect on finances, and the club were forced to float the idea of merging with South Warrandyte to survive. However this option was voted against, and both clubs continued and prospered in the coming seasons.

One positive to come out of this period was the council refurbishing the practice net area after the 1997/98 season.

The start of the 21st century presented an opportunity to showcase the history with the announcement of the team of the century. The nomination criterion was a minimum of 50 games, 1,000 runs or 100 wickets, and was voted on by all living life members. The team known as Club 12 was Allan Chapman (C), John Sharman (V/C), John Chapman, Graeme Jacobs, Fred Jungwirth, Bruce Kline (w/k), Graeme Lloyd, Steve Pascoe, Greg Tregear, Gerald Walshe, Robert White, Alan Woolcock. All team members aside from Allan Chapman, who died in 1981, were honoured at a function on 25 November 2000.

The 3 seasons from 1998/99 to 2000/01 were also particularly taxing, with none of the 4 senior grades reaching higher than 9th on the ladder. This caused a tremendous strain on morale, causing many players to lose interest, and the 4th XI were often playing short and sometimes forfeiting altogether. An RDCA condition at the time was for a club to remain in the top grade of Chandler Shield, it must field a minimum of 4 sides. As Warrandyte couldn't guarantee that, it was decided in a heated committee meeting to relegate itself.
As it turned out before the season started, the RDCA removed that rule, meaning Warrandyte could have remained.

=== Looking back and moving forward (2001 – present) ===
16 August 2001 saw the launch of the Warrandyte Cricket Club website. Created by Steve Goddard, it showcased the rich statistical history of the club, and is still one of the most extensive local sporting websites in the country.

The club entered the 2nd tier Wilkins Cup in 2001/02, and found the format of the mixed one and two day structure unpredictable. The 1st XI would often find themselves playing finals one year, and fighting relegation the next. Some excellent work was being done with the juniors, thanks largely to the introduction of a father/son 4th XI run mainly by Lee Dehmel and Graham Rees.

Season 2002/03 saw the introduction of the Steve Pascoe Medal, which became an annual award given to the highest vote polling player at the club, selected by the players on a 3-2-1 basis each game. The first season was low key, with only an overall medal presented to Brendan Baker. A vote count and separate grade medals were introduced the following year, which are named after former greats of that grade: Gerald Walshe, Brett Kline, Nathan Croft, Jim Gathercole and Bob Leguier (1st XI to 5th XI). The votes count, which is now combined with the club's Presentation Night, has developed from humble beginnings into the biggest event on the calendar.

Season 2003/04 saw 5-time 1st XI Club Champion Adam White, son of Life Member Robert, win his first of two association best and fairest medals. White has become one of the club's most decorated players ever, with a multitude of 1st XI awards including 7 batting, 1 bowling and 2 Gerald Walshe Medals, as well as 2 Steve Pascoe Medals.

The club celebrated its 150th birthday with a dinner held on 22 January 2005 at it was an outstanding success. Then on Sunday 13 February 2005, the club continued the celebrations with a Twenty20 against an Invitational XI that included a mix of District cricketers, AFL footballers identities including Sam Mitchell and Gerard Whateley, along with entertainers Wilbur Wilde and Ernie Dingo as MC.

Up until 2007, statistics were collated from club scorebooks dated back to 1952. But after extensive research conducted by Steve Goddard at the State Library of Victoria, match scores and articles were obtained from various newspapers dating back to when the club starting competitively in 1905 and beyond. Previously all 1st XI players were given a number in order of their debut, and with over 800 extra match results discovered, 164 more players were added to the list. John Till is credited as Warrandyte 1st XI player No.1, while the most recent is Luke Warren No.431.

A Heritage Night club function was held on 20 January 2007, where past and present players were honoured with their new number. It was also the 25th anniversary of the club's first premiership in the top grade, and the players reunited. The function followed a Past Players Day, when the newly created Steve Pascoe Cup was fought out between rivals Warrandyte and Norwood, where Pascoe is a life member at both clubs. Pascoe also umpired the game, and awarded the Chris Snaidero Medal to the man of the match. Snaidero is another legend of both cricket clubs. Norwood were victors on this occasion, and the cup will be up for grabs whenever the teams play.

Overall the decade was successful, and the winning culture improved player numbers that were previously eroded. From 2003/04 to 2010/11, 30 out of a possible 38 senior teams participated in finals, claiming 7 premierships, as well as 3 junior and 1 veterans flags. But unfortunately, none for the 1st XI in 3 attempts, who are still working and striving towards the ultimate success, and a return to the top grade.

== Premierships ==
Team	Season	Competition	Grade	Match Details
1st XI	1906/07	Cameron	A Grade	Warrandyte 110 & 84 d Yarra Glen 1st XI 120 & 67 by 7 runs at Warrandyte
1st XI	1920/21	BHRDCA	B Grade	Warrandyte 130 & 135 d Blackburn 2nd XI 116 & 1/18 by 14 runs at Mitcham
2nd XI	1933/34	RDCA	C Grade	
1st XI	1936/37	RDCA	B Grade	
1st XI	1939/40	RDCA	B Grade	Warrandyte 205 d North Bayswater 1st XI 142 by 63 runs at East Ringwood
2nd XI	1939/40	RDCA	C Grade	Warrandyte d Ringwood 2nd XI at Wantirna
1st XI	1947/48	RDCA	B Grade	Y.C.W. 1st XI 203 & 130 lost to Warrandyte 116 & 6/218 by 4 wickets at Kilsyth
1st XI	1956/57	BHRDCA	B Grade	Warrandyte 146 & 201 d St. Peters 1st XI 130 & 177 by 40 runs at East Burwood
Under 16s	1966/67	BHRDCA	Grade 2	
Women's	1975/76	VWCA	C MTN DIST	Warrandyte 165 & 107 d Doncaster 97 & 67 by 108 runs
Under 14s	1977/78	RDCA	Grade 3	Warrandyte d Kilsyth
4th XI	1978/79	RDCA	H Grade	South Ringwood 3rd XI 179 & 2/60 lost to Warrandyte 269 by 90 runs at Ainslie Park
Under 12s	1978/79	RDCA	Grade 2	Warrandyte (1) 6/223 d Ainslie Park (1) 124 by 99 runs
1st XI	1979/80	RDCA	A Grade	Ainslie Park 1st XI 124 & 9/211 lost to Warrandyte 248 & 0/88 by 124 runs at North Ringwood
2nd XI	1979/80	RDCA	A2 Grade	Warrandyte 261 d Heathmont Uniting 2nd XI 255 by 6 runs
3rd XI	1979/80	RDCA	E Grade	Norwood 4th XI 113 & 206 lost to Warrandyte 275 & 3/45 by 7 wickets at Wonga Park
Under 12s	1979/80	RDCA	Grade 1	Warrandyte (1) 253 d Croydon North (1) 146 by 107 runs
Under 12s	1979/80	RDCA	Grade 4	Warrandyte (2) 293 d Croydon North (2) 156 by 137 runs
5th XI	1980/81	RDCA	H Grade	Warrandyte 225 & 125 d Heathmont Baptists 1st XI 91 & 72 by 187 runs
Under 12s	1980/81	RDCA	Grade 1	Warrandyte (1) 258 drew with North Ringwood (1) 2/106
1st XI	1981/82	RDCA	Chandler 1	Warrandyte 190 & 96 d Wantirna South 1st XI 128 & 8/131 by 62 runs at East Ringwood
Under 14s	1981/82	RDCA	Grade 4	Warrandyte (2) 148 d Croydon (2) 143 by 5 runs
1st XI	1983/84	RDCA	Chandler 1	Warrandyte 9/304 d East Ringwood 1st XI 243 by 61 runs at North Ringwood
Under 16s	1983/84	RDCA	Grade 1	Warrandyte (1) 194 d Mooroolbark (1) 137 by 57 runs
Under 16s	1985/86	RDCA	Grade 1	Warrandyte (1) 166 d Croydon North (1) 102 by 64 runs
Under 16s	1989/90	RDCA	Grade 2	East Ringwood (1) 131 lost to Warrandyte (1) 9/159
2nd XI	1990/91	RDCA	Chandler 2	Warrandyte 9/312 d Ainslie Park 2nd XI 269 by 43 runs at North Ringwood
Women's	1991/92	VWCA	A EAST	Warrandyte 191 d Melbourne 117 by 74 runs
4th XI	1993/94	RDCA	Chandler 4	Warrandyte d Vermont 4th XI
4th XI	1994/95	RDCA	Chandler 4	Warrandyte d Kilsyth 4th XI by 3 runs
4th XI	1995/96	RDCA	Chandler 4	Kilsyth 4th XI 75 lost to Warrandyte 6/163 by 5 wickets at Norwood #2
Under 14s	1997/98	RDCA	Grade 3	Warrandyte (1) 3/120 d South Warrandyte (1) 111 by 9 runs
Over 40s	1998/99	RDCA	Veterans 1	Norwood (1) 6/132 lost to Warrandyte (1) 3/134 by 7 wickets
Under 12s	2000/01	RDCA	Grade 3	Warrandyte (2) 6/104 d Kilsyth (2) 9/99 by 5 runs
Under 16s	2000/01	RDCA	Grade 4	Warrandyte (1) 5/70 d Kilsyth (1) 63 by 7 runs
Under 16s	2002/03	RDCA	Grade 2	Warrandyte (1) 155 d Croydon Ranges (1) 149 by 6 runs
Under 13s	2003/04	RDCA	Grade 1	Mooroolbark (1) 123 lost to Warrandyte (1) 3/124 by 7 wickets
Under 12s	2004/05	RDCA	Grade 4	South Croydon (1) 9/107 lost to Warrandyte (1) 3/112 by 7 wickets
Over 40s	2004/05	RDCA	Grade 3	North Ringwood (2) 126 lost to Warrandyte (1)
2nd XI	2006/07	RDCA	B Grade	Warrandyte 176 d Bayswater Park 143 by 33 runs at Wonga Park
4th XI	2006/07	RDCA	K Grade	Olinda 4th XI 169 lost to Warrandyte 7/170 by 3 wickets at Warrandyte
Under 14s	2006/07	RDCA	Grade 3	Warrandyte (1) 176 d North Ringwood (2) 55 by 121 runs
4th XI	2007/08	RDCA	J Grade	Ainslie Park 5th XI 115 lost to Warrandyte 6/146 by 5 wickets at Montrose
2nd XI	2008/09	RDCA	A Grade	Chirnside Park 2nd XI 121 lost to Warrandyte 3/124 by 7 wickets at Bayswater Park
5th XI	2008/09	RDCA	M Grade	Warrandyte 7/216 d Norwood 6th XI 91 by 125 runs at Warrandyte
3rd XI	2009/10	RDCA	E Grade	Warrandyte 155 d Montrose 3rd XI 145 by 10 runs at Bayswater Park
4th XI	2009/10	RDCA	H Grade	Warrandyte 149 d North Ringwood 5th XI 52 by 97 runs at Griff Hunt Res.

== Club Legends ==
Players with over 200 games or 4,000 runs or 300 wickets in senior cricket (in order of induction) :-
William Colman, James Schubert, Richard McCulloch, Les Till, Les McCulloch, William Moore, John Moore, Jack McAuley, Allan Chapman, Les Adams, Horace Smith Jnr, Peter Adams, Lindsay Bellinger, Alan Woolcock, John Chapman, Alan Bellinger, Geoff Day, Robert White, Stephen Peake, Graeme Lloyd, Steve Pascoe, Fred Jungwirth, Robert Leguier, Graham Lawrence, Mark Davis, Chris Snaidero, Geoff Taylor, Darren Peters, Gerald Walshe, Brett Kline, Tony Sturesteps, Max Summers, Greg Tregear, Russell Dorning, Brendan Baker, Cameron Day, Steve Bell, David Mooney, Greg Creber, Colin Dorning, Stephen Warr, Nathan Croft, Stephen Goddard, Tyson Brent, Campbell Holland, Dean Gidley, Adam White, Adam Beardall, Matthew Chapman, Matthew Sazenis, John Prangley, Craig Lincoln, Daniel Wellesley.

== Notable players ==
Australian Test players – Rodney Hogg
District 1st XI players – Bruce Kline, David Stickels, Robert White, Lindsay Clay, John Salter, Greg Tregear, Andrew Hood, Reece Kline, Jason Kline, Brett Montgomery, Warren Cottrell, Christopher Bambury, Thomas Naughtin, Ayrton Dehmel, Jake Sherriff
Others – Jon Hassall, Brett Ratten, David Cloke, Jason Cloke, Cameron Cloke, Travis Cloke, Angus Monfries (AFL footballers), Clinton Grybas (commentator), Adam Beardall (world's smallest and least important man), Doug Hilton

== Club Names ==
- Anderson's Creek (1855–1904)
  - Anderson's United (1882)
- Warrandyte (1905/06-1948/49, 1954/55-1959/60, 1967/68-Current)
- West Warrandyte (1949/50-1953/54)
- Warrandyte Footballers (1960/61-1966/67)

== Affiliations!! ==
- Cameron Cricket Association (1905/06 – 1906/07) a.k.a. Cameron Trophy, Cameron Cricket Trophy Association
- Box Hill Reporter District Cricket Association (1908/09 – 1931/32, 1934/35, 1949/50 – 1974/75)
- Ringwood and District Cricket Association (1932/33 – 1933/34, 1935/36 – 1947/48, 1975/76 – Present)
