= Warrandyte =

Suburb of Melbourne, Victoria, Australia

- Suburb
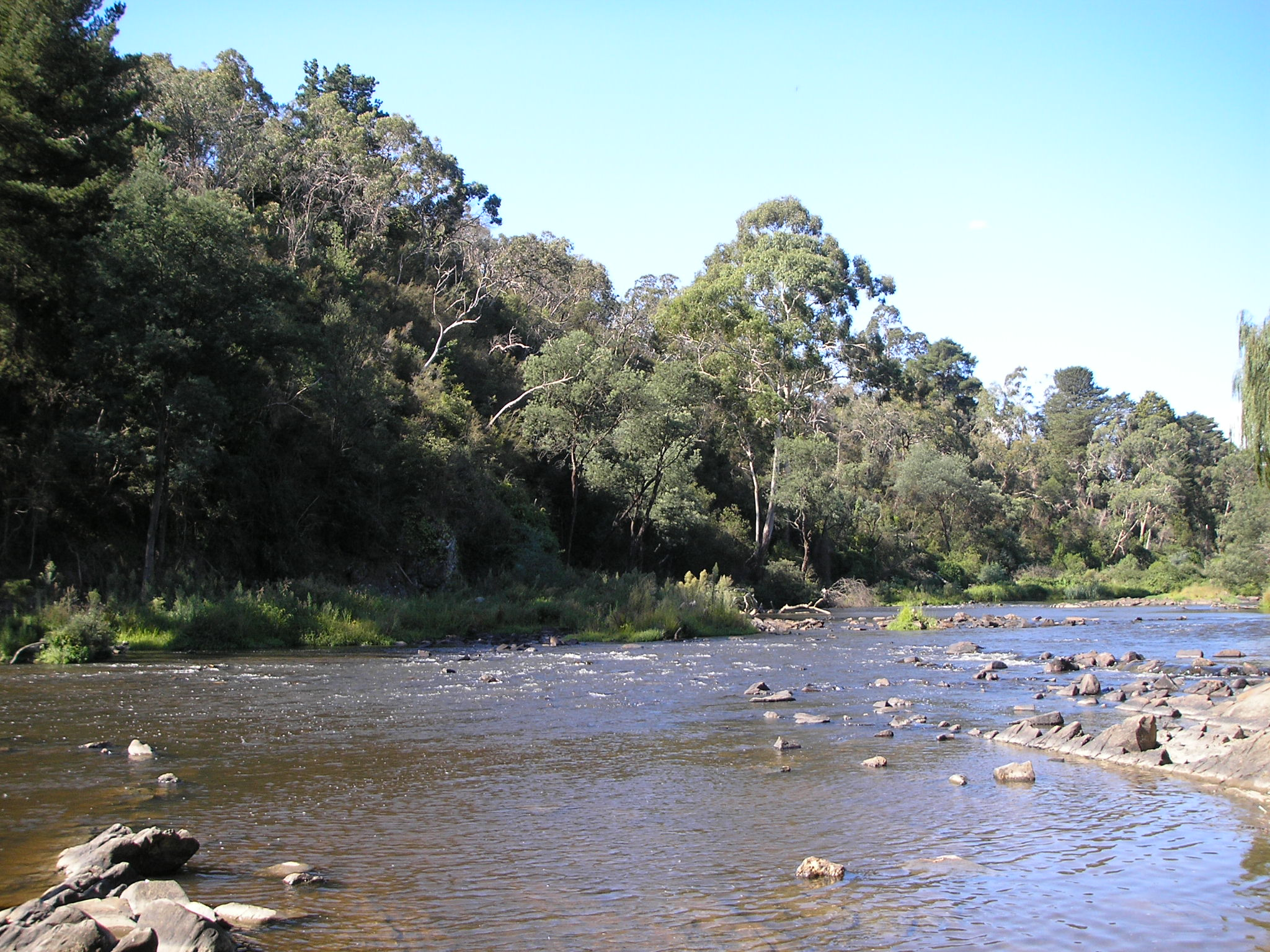
- The Yarra River flowing through Warrandyte

- Interactive map of Warrandyte
- Coordinates: 37.738°S 145.223°E
- Country: Australia
- State: Victoria
- City: Melbourne
- LGA: City of Manningham
- Location: 24 km (15 mi) from Melbourne CBD
- Established: 1839

Government
  - State electorate: Warrandyte
  - Federal division: Menzies

Area
  - Total: 17.6 km^{2} (6.8 sq mi)
- Elevation: 113 m (371 ft)

Population
  - Total: 5,541 (2021 census)
  - Density: 314.8/km^{2} (815.4/sq mi)
- Postcode: 3113
- County: Evelyn
- Website: Warrandyte
Suburbs around Warrandyte
Eltham	Warrandyte North	Wonga Park
Templestowe	Warrandyte	Wonga Park
Donvale	Park Orchards	Warrandyte South

Warrandyte (/ˈwɒrəndaɪt/ WORR-ən-dyte) is a suburb of Melbourne, Victoria, Australia, 24 km north-east of Melbourne's Central Business District, located within the City of Manningham local government area. It is built on the lands of the Wurundjeri people of the Woiworung language group of the Kulin Nation. Warrandyte recorded a population of 5,541 at the 2021 census.

Warrandyte is bounded in the west by the Mullum Mullum Creek and Target Road, in the north by the Yarra River, in the east by Jumping Creek and Anzac Road, and in the south by an irregular line from Reynolds Road, north of Donvale, Park Orchards and Warrandyte South.

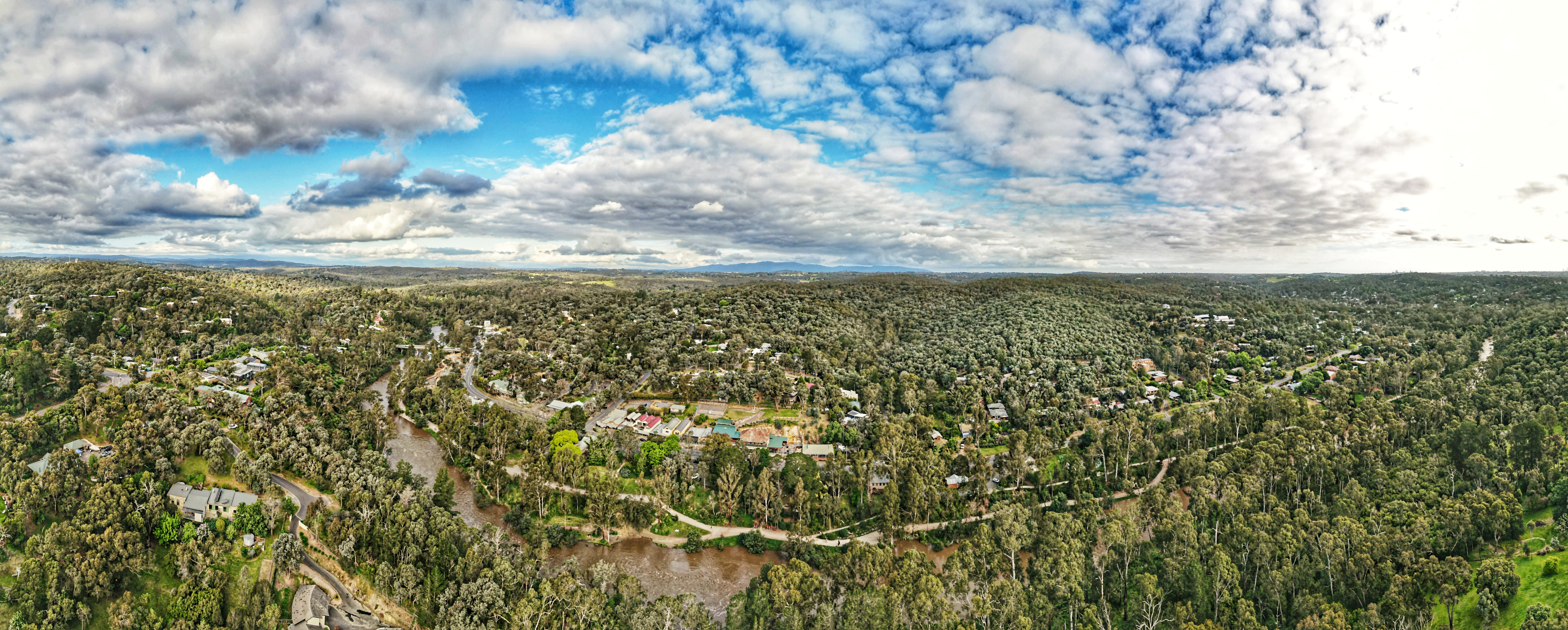

Warrandyte was founded as a Victorian town, located in the once gold-rich rolling hills east of Melbourne, and is now on the north-eastern boundary of suburban Melbourne. Gold was first discovered in the town in 1851 and together, with towns like Bendigo and Ballarat, led the way in gold discoveries during the Victorian gold rush. Today Warrandyte retains much of its past in its surviving buildings of the Colonial period and remains a twin community with North Warrandyte, which borders the Yarra River to its north.

== Etymology ==
In Australian Aboriginal mythology (see dreamtime), a Wurundjeri dreamtime story tells of a great eagle; "the all powerful, ever watchful creator of the world", named Bunjil, who "once gazed down upon his people from the star Altair and saw their wrong doing. Awaiting their return, with a mighty crash of thunder, he hurled down a star to destroy them". Where the star struck created a gorge in which much of the town today is located. Bunjil's people remembered the spot, and referred to it as Warrandyte, speculated to mean "that which is thrown".

== History ==
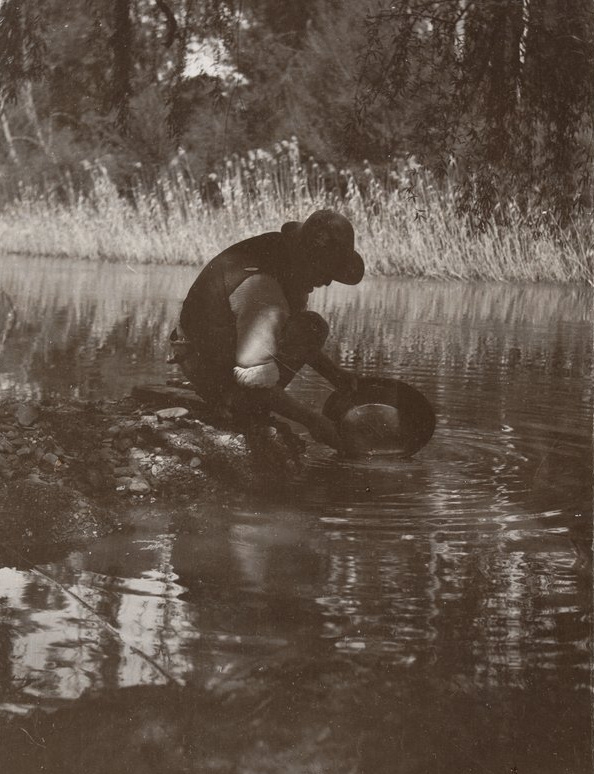
Man panning for gold at Warrandyte, 1913

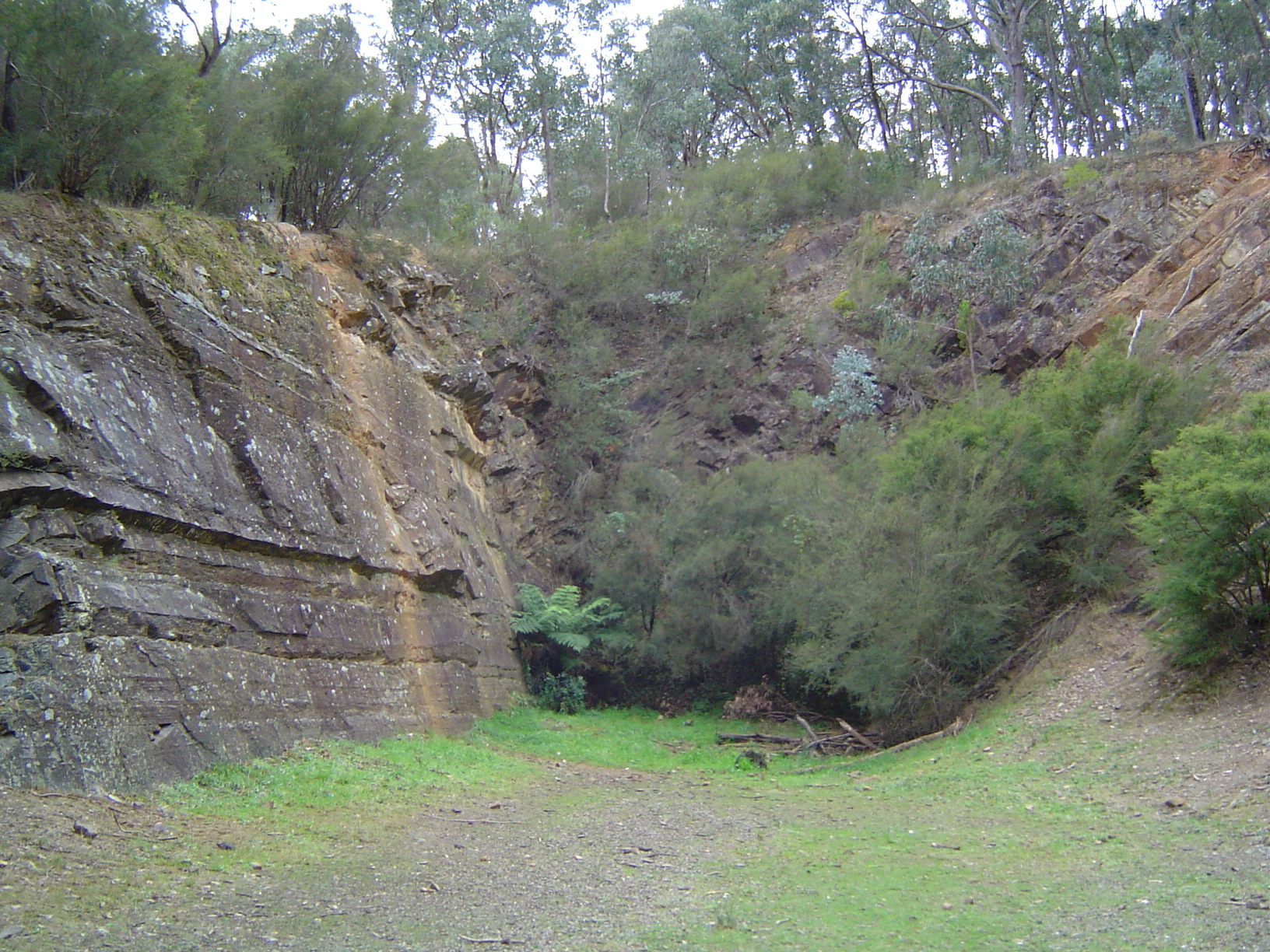
A quarry in Warrandyte, once used to mine stone for buildings and structures during the gold rush era

In 1839, James Anderson owned a cattle and sheep station in the area that is now Warrandyte, giving his name to Anderson's Creek, on which it remains today. In 1841, surveyor T. H. Nutt named the area 'Parish of Warrandyte', and in 1856 the township was laid out and named 'Township of Wanrrandyte, County of Evelyn'. This name was not legally formalised until 1908.

In 1851, gold was first discovered in Victoria, in Warrandyte, at Anderson's Creek, by Louis Michel, the approximate location of the site is marked by a cairn on Fourth Hill, in the Warrandyte State Park. While some mining did occur in the area throughout the peak of the gold rush, it was not until the late 19th century, after gold discoveries reduced in the more popular regions, that the area around Warrandyte was intensively mined, particularly around Fourth Hill and Whipstick Gully. Some areas continued to be mined up until the 1960s. The Warrandyte Post Office opened on 1 August 1857.

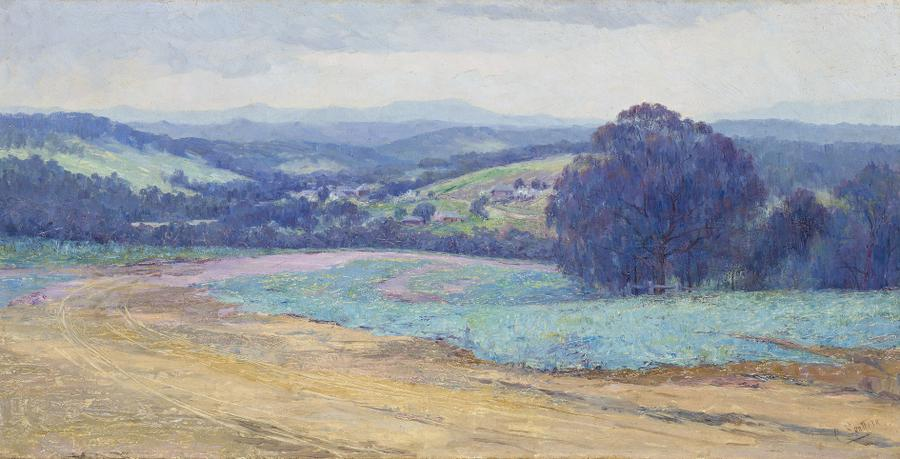
Clara Southern, The Road to Warrandyte, ca. 1905–1910

In the early 20th century, Warrandyte (mainly now North Warrandyte) became a popular destination for artists of the Heidelberg School, who sought subject matter further into the bush. This led to the development of an artists camp and small colony. Though not as substantial as the older colonies at Heidelberg and Box Hill, several artists, such as Clara Southern and Walter Withers, who were associated with the Heidelberg School, took up residence in Warrandyte. Others followed, including Penleigh Boyd, Harold Herbert, Jo Sweatman and Gus McLaren, all of North Warrandyte.

=== Bushfires ===
Major bushfires have swept through Warrandyte throughout history, and the town was at the centre of the Black Friday bushfires in 1939, in which 71 people lost their lives. The 1962 fires also devastated North Warrandyte. Many houses were destroyed and many lives lost. In 2009 the Black Saturday fires in Kinglake were 15 minutes away from North Warrandyte. On 9 February 2014, a bushfire broke out in Warrandyte burning approximately 10 hectares and destroying 3 houses. Major bushfires to have swept through Warrandyte include:

- 1851 - 6 February "Black Thursday"
- 1939 - 13 January "Black Friday"
- 1962 - 14–16 January
- 2014 - 9 February

== Geography ==
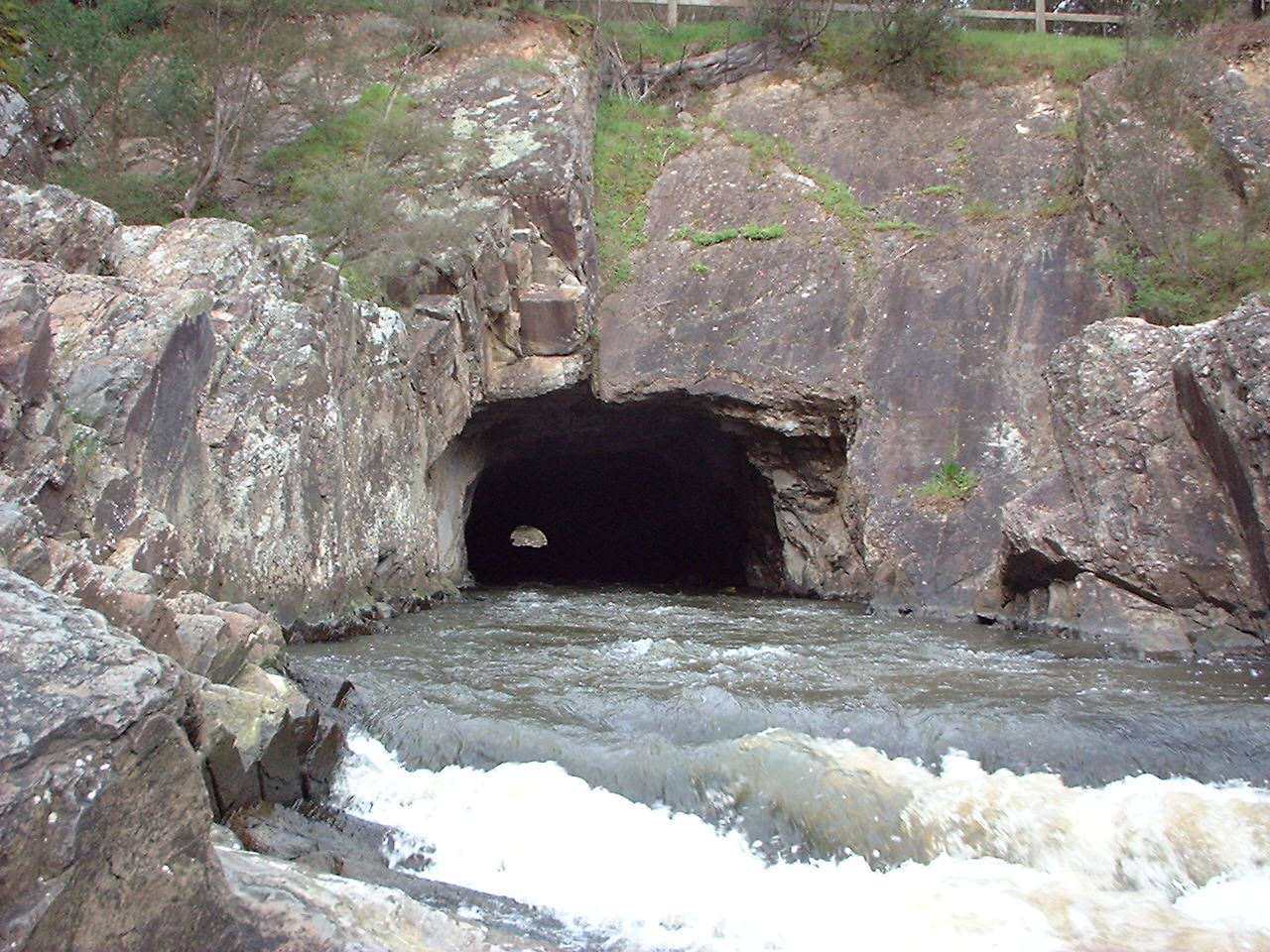
Pound Bend Tunnel was created by gold miners during the gold rush to divert the Yarra River

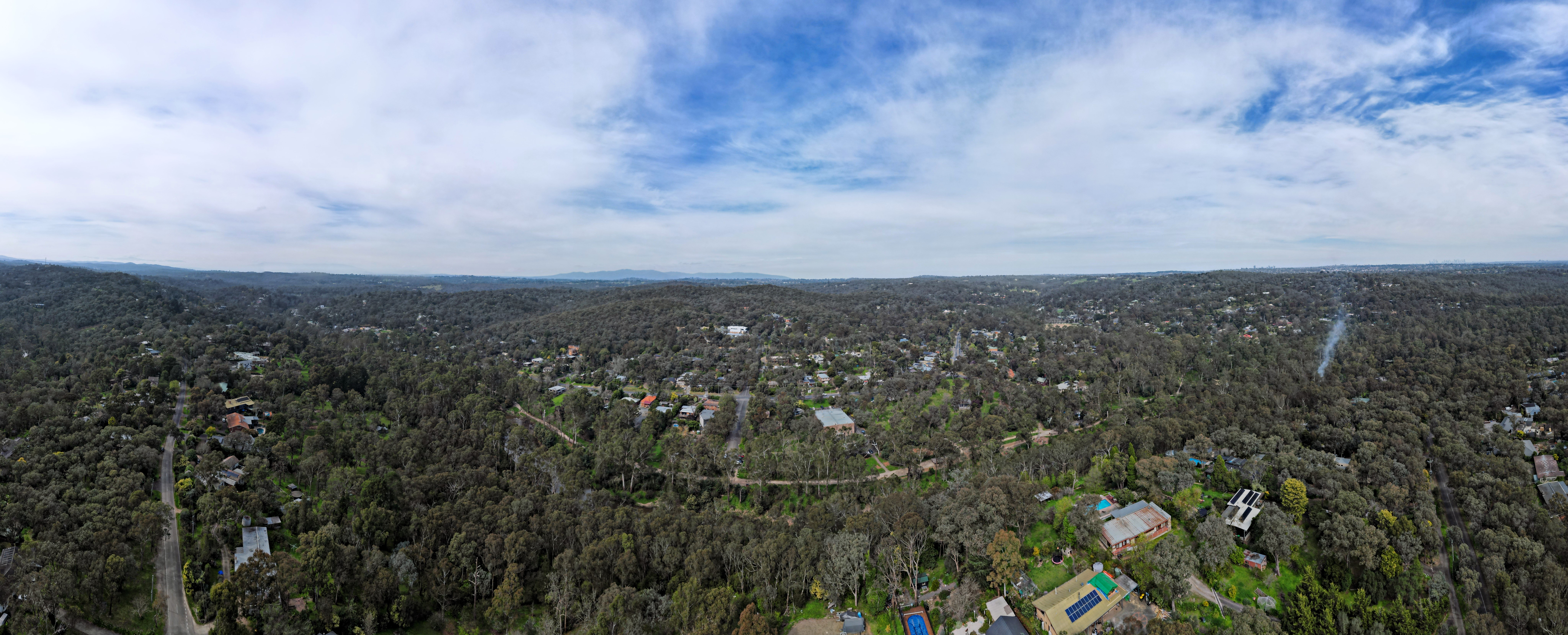
Aerial panorama of Warrandyte. September 2023.

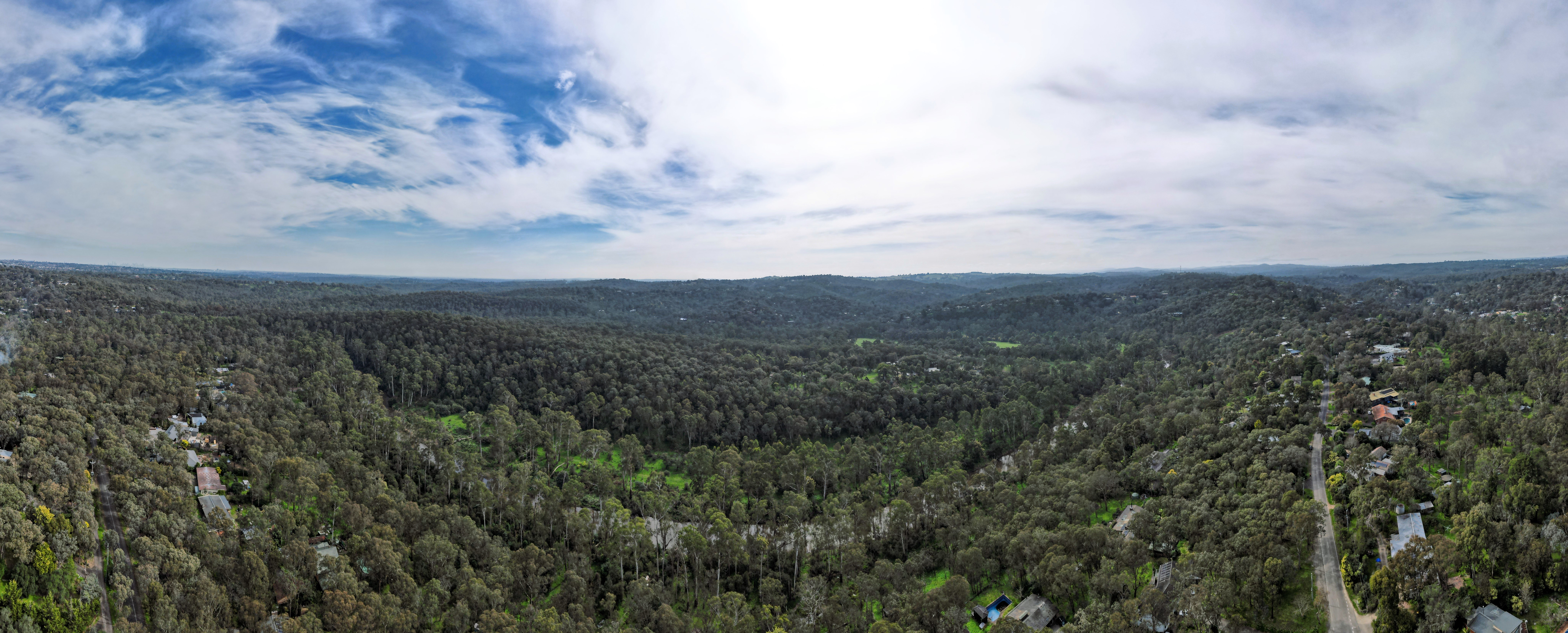
Aerial panorama of the Yarra River at Warrandyte. September 2023.

Warrandyte is situated on the southern banks of the Yarra River. The river and hills surrounding the town were once rich in gold and the ruins of mineshafts and tunnels can be found throughout the Warrandyte State Park, amongst other locations. While the central town itself is nestled into a gorge on the river, the suburb covers a reasonably large area of land and can be divided up into the following sections:

Central Warrandyte comprises the main street of Ringwood-Warrandyte Road and Heidelberg-Warrandyte Road (Yarra Street), Pound Bend and the southern banks of the Yarra River.

Andersons Creek flows from neighbouring South Warrandyte and Warranwood into the Yarra just before the beginning of Pound Bend. This area is where several gullies converge and create a geographical hole, with Fourth Hill to the east and the hills on the eastern banks of the Mullum Mullum Creek to the west. This becomes evident when driving through Warrandyte on Heidelberg-Warrandyte Road, as the hills guide the road down towards Andersons Creek.

The Eastern banks of the Mullum Mullum Creek were home to vast orchards overflowing from neighbouring East Doncaster and as a result, much of the vegetation has been cleared. Today the area is covered in large residential properties due to local council regulations allowing land to be subdivided into larger sites.

== Transportation ==
Warrandyte is serviced primarily by the private car, however a bus service actively operates along the main roads of Ringwood-Warrandyte Road and Heidelberg-Warrandyte Road (Yarra Street).

== Community ==
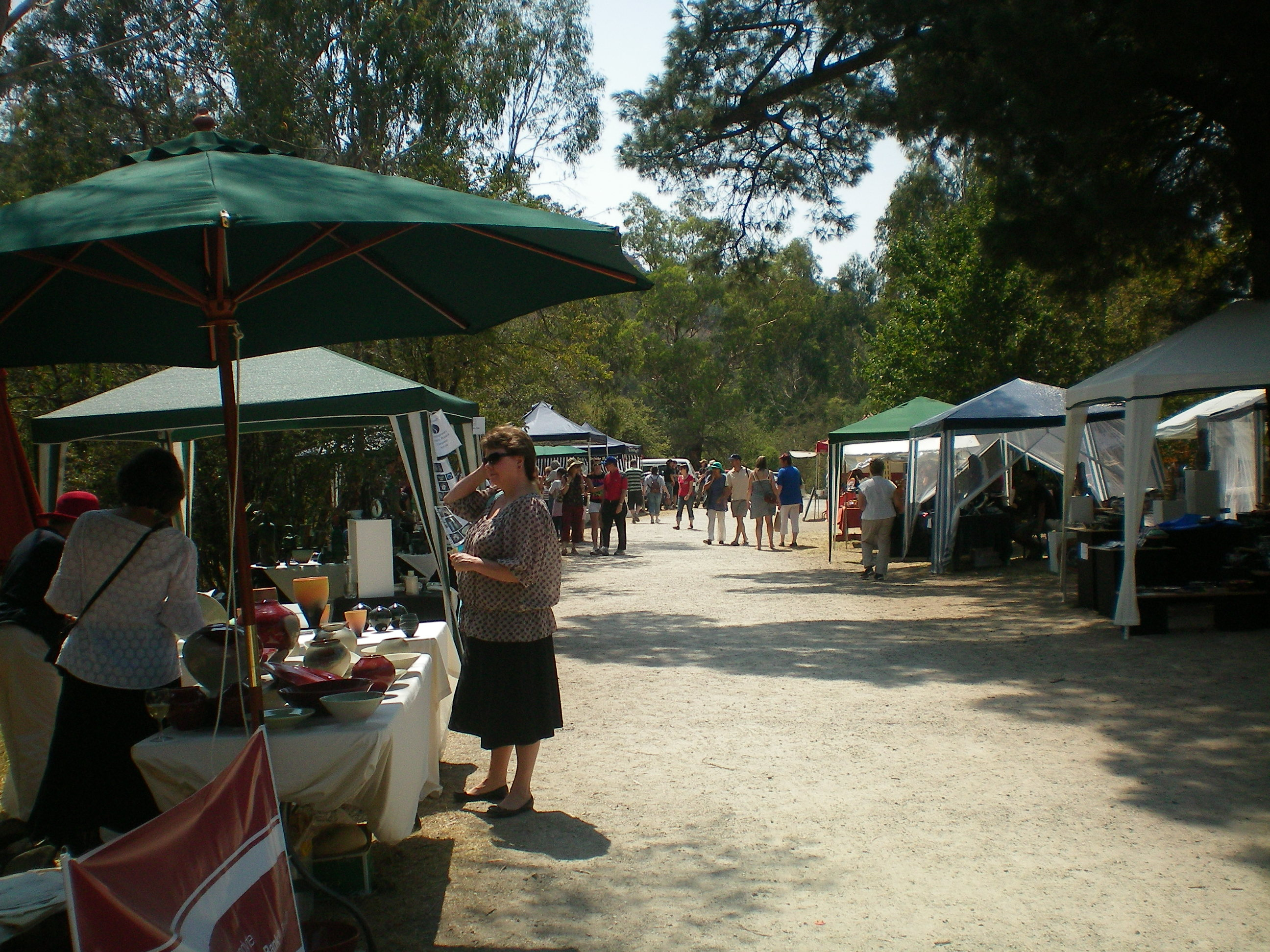
Warrandyte Pottery Expo by the banks of the Yarra River

The Pottery Expo at Warrandyte was instigated by local studio potter, Jane Annois in February 2001. It is now an annual event run each February, showcasing the work of selected studio ceramic artists from around Australia, along with international guest artists. Ceramicists who have exhibited in previous Expos include: Arnaud Barraud, Kevin Boyd, Csongvay Blackwood, Greg Daly, Janet DeBoos, Minna Graham, Ted Secombe and Prue Venables.

The Warrandyte Festival, one of the last remaining volunteer-run festivals in Victoria, is held every year in mid March. Typically, the festival features a variety of attractions. Many stalls sell local produce or crafts and there are numerous historical exhibits, as well as safety demonstrations by the CFA. Warrandyte is serviced by the community newspaper Warrandyte Diary. The Diary was established in 1970 by local screenwriter Cliff Green, journalist Lee Tindale and cartoonist Jock Macneish. The Diary has provided news, information and entertainment to Warrandyte and its surrounding communities for more than 50 years.

== Facilities ==
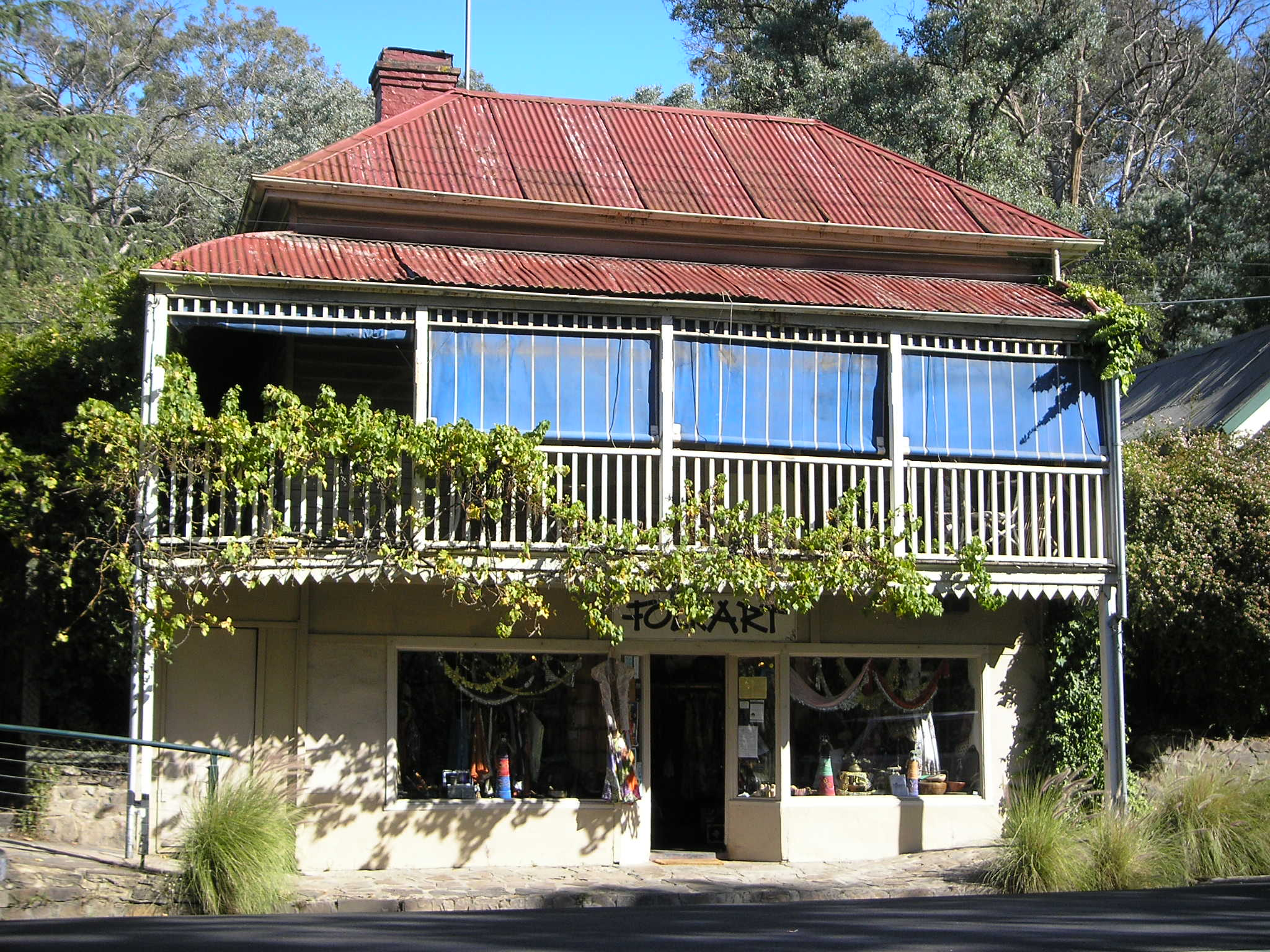
19th century Victorian house, converted into a shop, on Yarra Street, Warrandyte

Warrandyte has a general post office, tennis courts, a community centre, an RSL club, bed and breakfasts, restaurants, a police station, a CFA fire station, two kindergartens, two recreational ovals (AFL Football and Cricket), Andersons Creek Cemetery and a Scout hall, canoe launching ramps, a skatepark, nurseries and tearooms and the Crystal Brook Holiday Centre. It also has a thriving arts community including theatre, pottery and painting centred at the Mechanics Institute Hall.

Warrandyte has two community owned and run micro-retirement villages operated as a co-operative.

=== Schools ===
- Warrandyte High School
- Andersons Creek Primary School
- Warrandyte Primary School

=== Places of Worship ===
- St Stephen's Anglican Church
- Warrandyte Community Church
- Warrandyte Uniting Church

=== Retail ===
- Goldfields Shopping Centre
- Shops on Yarra Road, near Warrandyte Bridge.

== Parklands and recreation ==
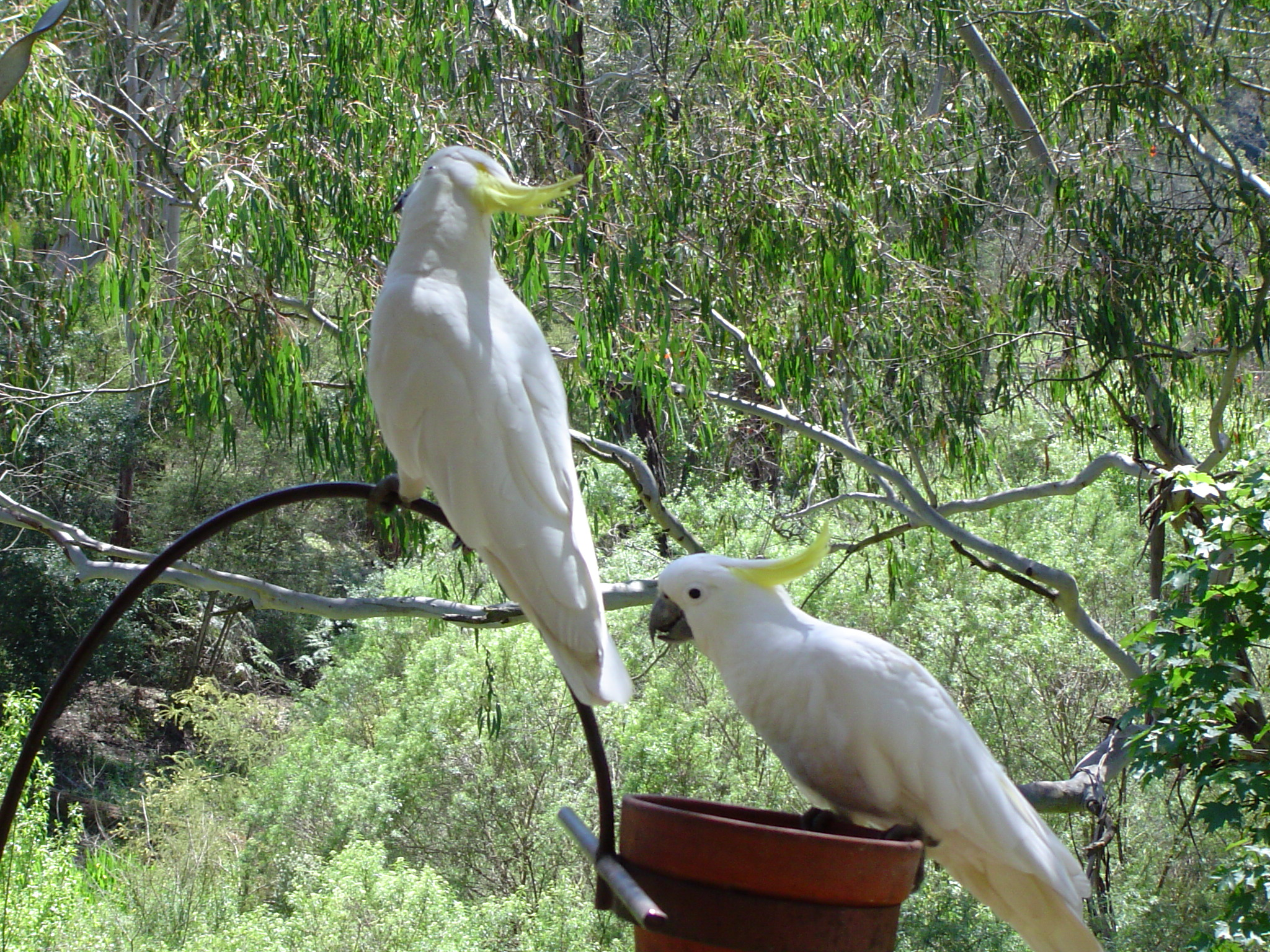
Cockatoos at the Stonehouse Cafe in Warrandyte

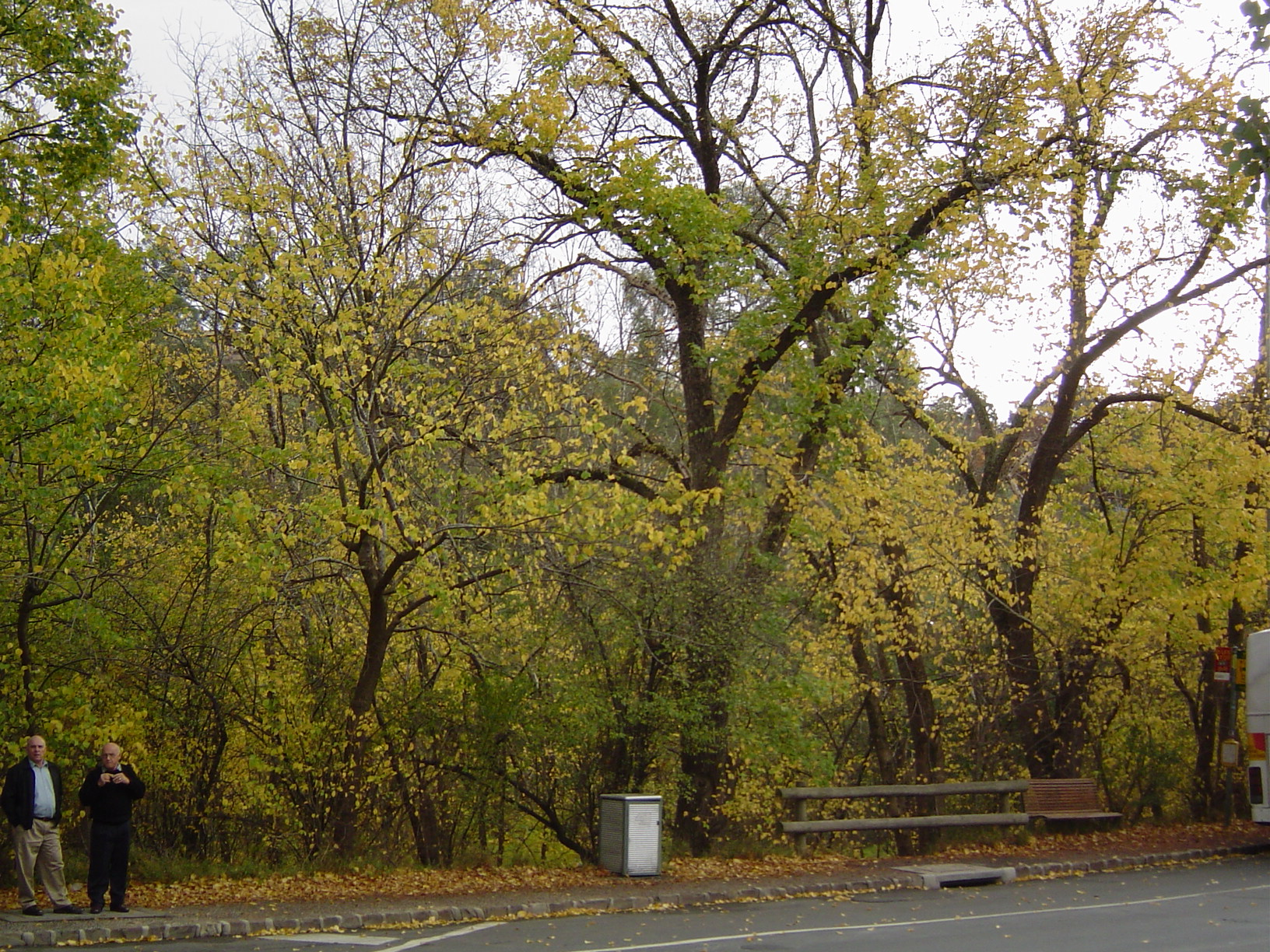
Deciduous trees alongside the main street in Warrandyte during autumn

Activities include walking, bike riding, mountain biking, tennis, basketball, Australian football, cricket, swimming in the Yarra River, canoeing, kayaking, skateboarding and bushwalking, among many others.

=== Parks, Gardens and Reserves in Warrandyte ===
- Warrandyte State Park (including Pound Bend, Fourth Hill, Black Flat, Mount Lofty and other areas)
- Pound Bend Reserve
- Stiggants Reserve
- Warrandyte Reserve (Home to the Warrandyte Cricket Club, which was formed in 1855, Warrandyte "The Bloods" Football Club, competing in the Eastern Football League and Junior Football Clubs and the Warrandyte Netball Club
- Longridge Farm
- Alexander Reserve
- Currawong Bush Park (Environment Centre and Wildlife Enclosure)
- Wildflower Reserve
- Andersons Creek Streamside Reserve

== See also ==
- City of Doncaster and Templestowe – Warrandyte was part of this former local government area [precursor to Manningham City Council].
- Electoral district of Warrandyte
- List of Melbourne suburbs
- Victorian gold rush
- Manningham Municipal Council Offices (see City of Manningham)
