= Lovedale, New South Wales =

Lovedale
- Town
- Coordinates: 32°46′54.3″S 151°23′04.1″E
- Country: Australia
- State: New South Wales
- Region: Hunter
- LGA: City of Cessnock
- Location: 54 km (34 mi) NW of Newcastle, New South Wales; 185 km (115 mi) N of Sydney

Government
  - State electorate: Cessnock
  - Federal division: Hunter

Population
  - Total: 502 (SAL 2021)
- Postcode: 2325
- County: Northumberland County
- Parish: Allandale

Lovedale is a locality in the Hunter Valley of New South Wales. It is two hours from Sydney, 30 minutes from Newcastle, and is connected to the Hunter Expressway. The name is believed to be a combination of one of the early European families, the Loves, with the memories of the hills and dales of Yorkshire. At the 2016 census, it had a population of 485.

== History ==
A major wine producing area since the 1800s when wheat and general produce farming turned to grapes, James Busby was vital in establishing the Hunter Valley as a key wine region by purchasing many properties in and around the Lovedale area. European settlement can be traced back to 1825 with significant land grants along Black Creek.

== Attractions ==
It is famous for the Lovedale Long Lunch which is a two-day festival held in May.

== Rothbury Cemetery ==
Rothbury Cemetery is an Anglican cemetery dating back to 1851. Joseph Broadbent Holmes established the land in 1842. His house hosted church services until 1867. Alfred Glennie offered two acres for a churchyard and fifty pounds towards the cost of a church on 12 August 1886. St Paul was opened by William Tyrrell on 15 December 1867. The church no longer stands on the site and its timber was purchased by Errol Mears to build a dairy shed. It is still used as a public cemetery by Cessnock City Council.

Emma's Cottage is a historic home.
