= Francis J. Broadhurst =

Australian painter and illustrator

- Born: c. 1914; Melbourne, Victoria
- Died: 3 August 1999 (aged 84–85); Sydney, New South Wales
- Education: National Gallery of Victoria Art School, Melbourne
- Years active: c. 1935–c. 1980

Francis Joseph Broadhurst (c. 1914–1999), sometimes called Frank Broadhurst, was an Australian commercial artist who worked as a caricaturist, illustrator, painter and designer. He was born and trained in Melbourne, but achieved his greatest success in Sydney.

== Life ==
Francis Joseph Broadhurst was born in Melbourne in about 1914. He trained for five years at the National Gallery of Victoria Art School under Napier Waller.

He was the theatrical caricaturist for the Melbourne magazine Table Talk in 1936. He moved to Sydney in 1937, and was employed by the Australian Consolidated Press as a caricaturist on the Sydney Daily Telegraph and an illustrator on the Australian Women's Weekly.

He is perhaps best known for his fine art illustrations to editions of Gargantua and Pantagruel and The Decameron published by Angus & Robertson. Twelve of the original pen drawings for the edition of Rabelais were purchased by the Art Gallery of New South Wales in 1949. The review in the Sydney Sun was full of praise:

It is refreshing to find in Francis Broadhurst an Australian artist who follows the precedent set by Gustave Dore, Norman Lindsay, Heath Robinson and other famous moderns in illustrating the classic masterpieces. Broadhurst has already displayed his brilliance as an illustrator by his drawings for Boccaccio's Decameron. In this large and beautifully-produced version of Gargantua and Pantagruel … he shows how finely his talent has developed. … This is certainly the greatest single work of illustration by an Australian artist since Norman Lindsay's best.

Later he turned to book design, and created the dusk jacket to Patricia Rolfe's The Journalistic Javelin (1979).

He died in Sydney on 3 August 1999.

== Works ==
=== Collections ===
- Mitchell Library, State Library of New South Wales, Sydney, NSW.
- Art Gallery of New South Wales, Sydney, NSW.

=== Illustrated books ===
- Boccaccio: The Decameron. Translated by J. M. Rigg. Illustrated by Francis J. Broadhurst. Sydney: Angus and Robertson, 1941.
- Rabelais: The Heroic Deeds of Gargantua and Pantagruel. Illustrated by Francis J. Broadhurst. Sydney: Angus and Robertson, 1951.
- Henry Turnbull: Leichhardt's Second Journey: A First-hand Account. Illustrations by Francis J. Broadhurst. Sydney: Halstead Press, 1983.
