= Fossicking =

Type of prospecting

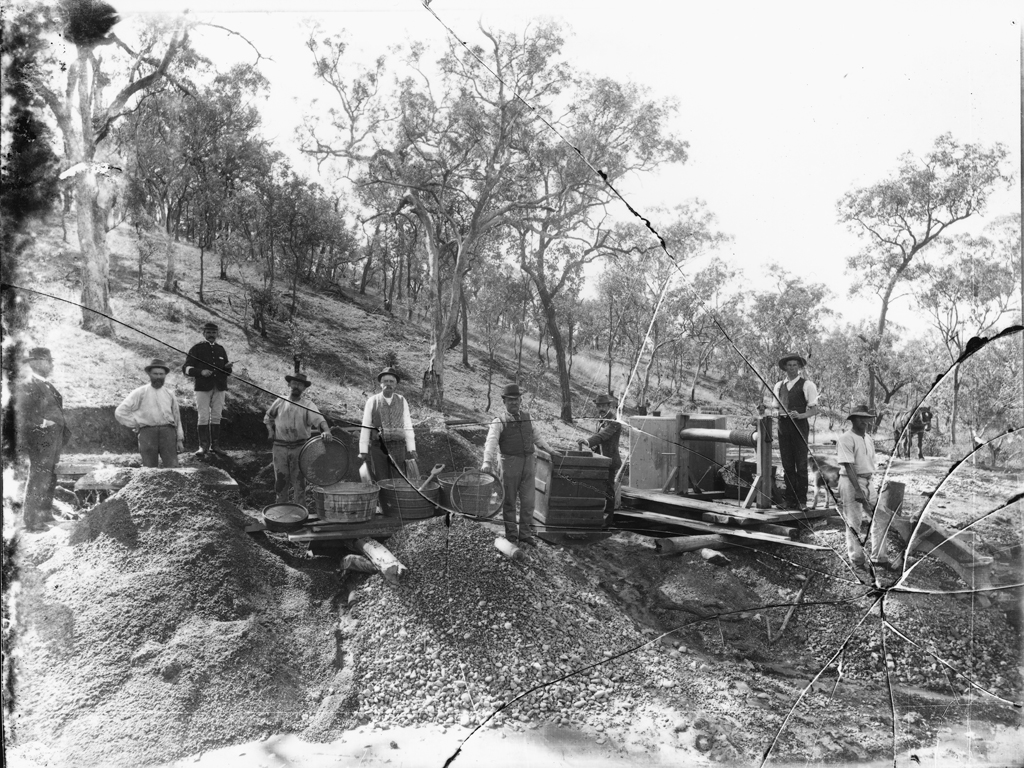
Fossicking for gold in Australia, 1900

In Australia, New Zealand and Cornwall, fossicking is prospecting, especially when carried out as a recreational activity. This can be for gold, precious stones, fossils, etc. by sifting through a prospective area. In Australian English and New Zealand English, the term has an extended use meaning to "rummage". Though the term has been argued to come from Cornish, it likely originates from the Latin fossa, meaning “ditch”, “trench”.

In Australia, "fossicking" is protected by a number of laws, which vary from state to state. In Queensland, fossickers must obtain a licence, but no licence is required in New South Wales. In South Australia, fossicking is defined as "the gathering of minerals as (a) a recreation; and (b) without any intention to sell the minerals or to utilise them for a commercial purpose", and these activities are considered as not being affected by the Mining Act.

Generally, this activity is regulated by the relevant State Government Department with certain rules to be followed. These typically include requiring the landowner's permission for access, use of hand (non-powered) tools only and restrictions on the amount of material that can be removed in a day. Fossicking can be done in remote locations with no facilities, or can be a part of a guided tour. Several small businesses in Australia have set up for the purpose of introducing new people to the activity or providing facilities for fossickers near the areas being searched. Frequently fossickers will try day trips; where this is impractical due to the remote location, they may combine the search with an overnight camping trip. Many of the areas where mineral specimens are to be found are areas of outstanding natural beauty, and other recreational activities such as photography and hiking are common additions to a fossicking trip.

In Cornwall, such prospecting was monitored by the Stannary.

== Noodling ==
The equivalent term used in searching for opal is noodling.

"Noodling: The practice of sifting through rejected mullock heaps for small pieces of precious opal inadvertently discarded by the miners. A number of people on the opal fields rely entirely on noodling for a living. They either sift through the waste material by hand ... or use a noodling machine. These people are 'professional' noodlers. Tourists and others casually searching the dumps for pieces of opal are also noodling."
