= List of road routes in Victoria =

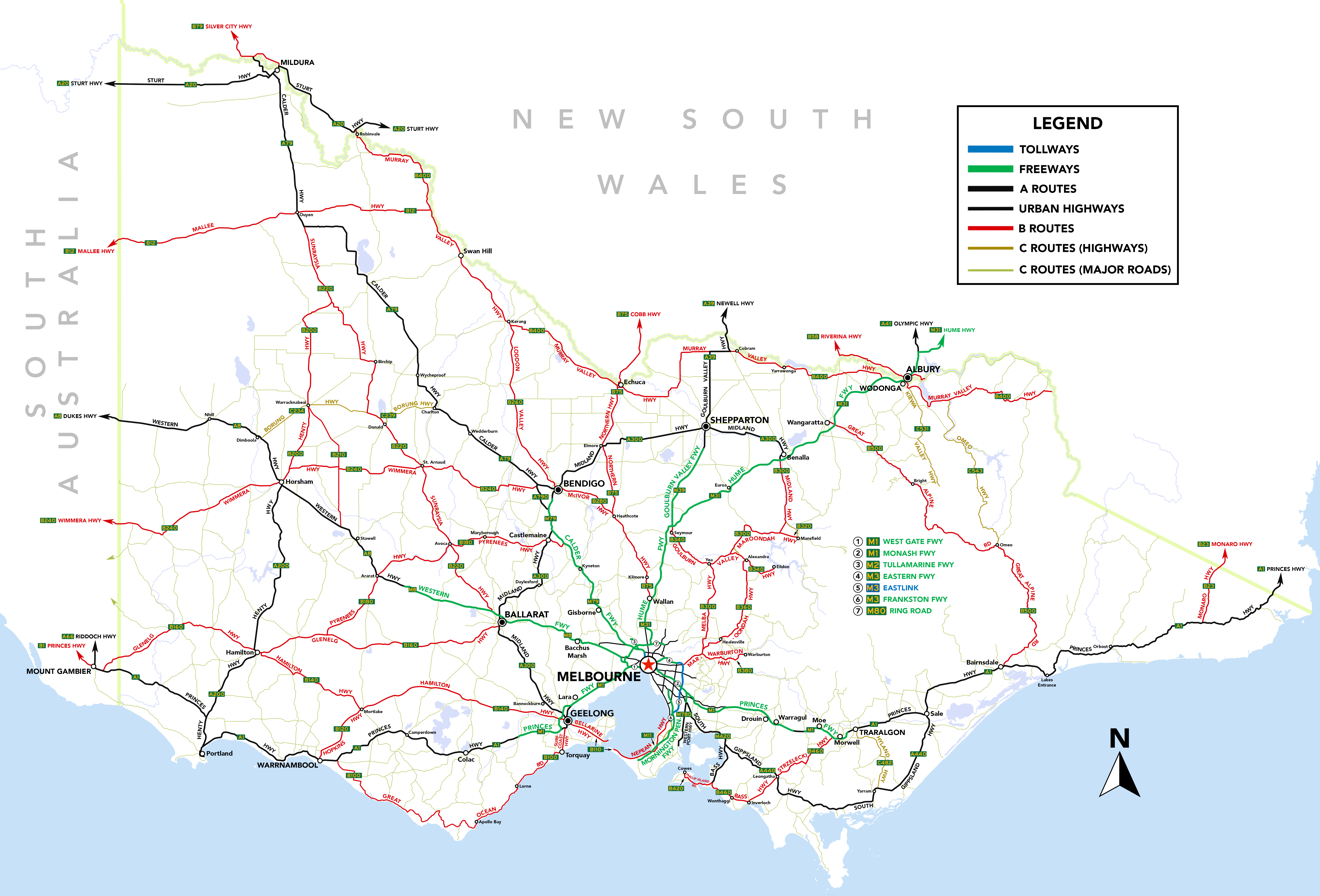
Victorian highway and road network, with significant cities and towns.

Road routes in Victoria assist drivers navigating roads throughout the state, as roads may change names several times between destinations, or have a second local name in addition to a primary name. There are two main route numbering schemes in use: numeric shields, and alphanumeric routes, with the former being replaced by the latter. The original scheme consists of numbered National Highways, National Routes, Metropolitan and State Routes, each identified with a different shield-shaped route marker. The alphanumeric Statewide Route Numbering Scheme, introduced in the 1990s, has replaced the previous scheme outside Melbourne, and some routes within Melbourne. It consists of alphanumeric routes, which are a one-to-three digit number prefixed with a letter – M, A, B, or C – that denotes the grade and importance of the road.

== History ==
Route numbers have been allocated to Victoria's roads since 1954, with the introduction of National Routes across all states and territories in Australia, symbolised by a white shield with black writing; National Route 1 ('Highway 1') was one of the best-known numbered national routes, due to its fame for circumnavigating the continent.

To supplement the National Route number system, a new route numbering scheme (now known as the Metropolitan Route Numbering Scheme) allocated blue-and-white shields across Melbourne in 1965, numbered to fit around existing National Routes; Freeway Routes, using green shields to better mark their specialised status, were spun off from this system between 1970 and 1987.

In 1974, the National Highway network was defined, which allowed some existing National Routes to be upgraded to National Highways. These were marked with the same shield design as the National Routes, except for their gold-on-green colouring and the word NATIONAL added across the top.

A shield system covering regional Victoria (the State Route Numbering Scheme) was introduced in 1985, marking out urban arterial routes and secondary rural highways. The Metropolitan Route Numbering Scheme across Melbourne received a major refurbishment in the late 1980s, with the creation of Tourist Routes as a result.

Beginning in late 1996, regional Victoria (and certain core routes through Melbourne) began to replace their system of National Routes, National Highways and State Routes with an alphanumeric route numbering system, called the Statewide Route Numbering Scheme. Many existing numbered routes were allocated a letter (M, A, B or C) in addition to its number, with 'M' routes denoting freeways, 'A' routes denoting routes of national significance, 'B' routes denoting routes of state significance, and 'C' routes acting as local access roads. Instead of shields, route numbers are displayed as yellow text on green rectangular backgrounds, and has now – with the exception of Tourist Routes – become the sole route numbering system in regional Victoria. The Great Ocean Road (signed B100) and Great Alpine Road (signed B500) were the first routes allocated, and with conversion beginning to the M1, in late 1996; signing work had been completed for all 'M' and 'A' class roads and for approximately half of the 'B' class roads throughout Victoria by the end of June 1998. Former National Highways route markers initially retained their shield design (including NATIONAL markings) after conversion, but VicRoads – as of September 2013 – removed them, bringing their design in line with the rest of the state.

Melbourne has been slower to convert between systems, having kept most of its Metropolitan routes, but is currently undergoing a systematic conversion from 2020. Routes listed here may change as a result.

== Alphanumeric Routes ==
=== M routes ===
M roads provide a consistent high standard of driving conditions, with divided carriageways, at least four traffic lanes, sealed shoulders and line-marking that is easily visible in all weather conditions. M roads are the primary road links connecting Melbourne and other capital cities and major provincial centres. In practice, this means M roads are usually at least dual-carriageway freeways or high standard rural highways with at least two lanes in each direction. Victorian route allocations use a blue background colour to designate a toll-road (sections attracting a toll are specifically marked).

Route	Component roads	From	Via	To	Length	Notes
M1	Princes Highway (west); Geelong Ring Road; Princes Freeway (west); West Gate Freeway	Colac	Geelong; Werribee; Laverton; South Melbourne; Chadstone; Dandenong; Pakenham; Warragul; Morwell	Traralgon	310 km (193 mi)	Highway 1 route: – re-aligned along Princes Highway through Waurn Ponds along current alignment when Stage 4B of Geelong Ring Road opened in 2013, renamed Waurn Ponds Drive – re-aligned along Princes Highway from Corio to Waurn Ponds along current alignment (replaced by) when Geelong Ring Road opened in 2009 – continues west as along Princes Highway (west) to VIC/SA border
M1	CityLink (Southern link)	Colac	Geelong; Werribee; Laverton; South Melbourne; Chadstone; Dandenong; Pakenham; Warragul; Morwell	Traralgon	310 km (193 mi)	Highway 1 route, toll road: – re-aligned along Sturt/Power Streets, City Road, Alexandra Avenue, Swan Street and Batman Avenue from Southbank to Melbourne along current alignment when Burnley Tunnel opened in 2000
M1	Monash Freeway; Princes Freeway (east); Princes Highway (east)	Colac	Geelong; Werribee; Laverton; South Melbourne; Chadstone; Dandenong; Pakenham; Warragul; Morwell	Traralgon	310 km (193 mi)	Highway 1 route: – re-aligned along South Gippsland Freeway and Princes Highway from Doveton to Narre Warren along current alignment (replaced by /) when Hallam bypass opened in 2003 – re-aligned along Princes Link and Princes Highways from Berwick to Nar Nar Goon along current alignment (replaced by //) when Pakenham bypass opened in 2007, Princes Link Highway renamed O'Shea Road in 2022 – continues east as along Princes Highway (east) to VIC/NSW border
M2	Tullamarine Freeway	Melbourne Airport	Gladstone Park; Essendon Fields; Brunswick West; Flemington	Port Melbourne	22 km (14 mi)	Allocated in 2018, signage progressively under conversion from to
M2	CityLink (Western link)	Melbourne Airport	Gladstone Park; Essendon Fields; Brunswick West; Flemington	Port Melbourne	22 km (14 mi)	Allocated in 2018, toll road, signage progressively under conversion from to
M3	Eastern Freeway	Clifton Hill	Bulleen; Nunawading; Ringwood; Scoresby; Keysborough; Carrum Downs	Frankston	62 km (39 mi)	Allocated when EastLink opened in 2008
M3	EastLink	Clifton Hill	Bulleen; Nunawading; Ringwood; Scoresby; Keysborough; Carrum Downs	Frankston	62 km (39 mi)	Allocated when EastLink opened in 2008, toll road
M3	Frankston Freeway	Clifton Hill	Bulleen; Nunawading; Ringwood; Scoresby; Keysborough; Carrum Downs	Frankston	62 km (39 mi)	Allocated when Peninsula Link opened in 2013
M4	West Gate Tunnel	Yarraville	Footscray	West Melbourne	8 km (5 mi)	Allocated when West Gate Tunnel opened in 2025, toll road
M8	Western Freeway	Buangor	Beaufort; Ballarat; Bacchus Marsh; Melton; Rockbank; Ravenhall	Derrimut	161 km (100 mi)	– Eastern end re-aligned along Ballarat Road from Ardeer to current alignment (replaced by) when Deer Park bypass opened in 2009 – Continues west as along Western Highway to VIC/SA border – Allocated in 1997, progressively being replaced by from 2013
M11	Mornington Peninsula Freeway	Dingley Village	Chelsea Heights; Carrum Downs; Frankston; Moorooduc; Dromana	Rosebud	60 km (37 mi)	– Allocated when Peninsula Link opened in 2013 – Northern end extended from Chelsea Heights to Dingley Village when Mordialloc Freeway opened in 2021
M31	Hume Freeway	Thomastown	Craigieburn; Seymour; Benalla; Wangaratta; Wodonga	VIC/NSW border	296 km (184 mi)	– Southern end re-aligned along Sydney Road from Fawkner to current alignment (replaced by) when Craigieburn bypass opened in 2005 – Continues north as along Hume Highway into NSW eventually to Sydney – Concurrency with along Hume Freeway from Barnawartha North to Wodonga – Allocated in 1997, progressively being replaced by from 2013
M39	Goulburn Valley Freeway	Seymour	Mangalore; Nagambie	Shepparton	68 km (42 mi)	– Continues north as along Goulburn Valley Highway to VIC/NSW border – Allocated in 2001, progressively being replaced by from 2013
M79	Calder Freeway	Ravenswood	Elphinstone; Kyneton; Diggers Rest; Keilor	Niddrie	122 km (76 mi)	– Continues north as along Calder Highway to VIC/NSW border – Concurrency with along Midland Highway from Ravenswood to Harcourt
M80	Western Ring Road	Altona North	Derrimut; Ardeer; Keilor East; Airport West; Thomastown	Greensborough	38 km (24 mi)	Allocated (from Ardeer to Fawkner) in 1997, extended south to Derrimut when Deer Park bypass opened in 2009, progressively being replaced by from 2013
M80	Metropolitan Ring Road	Altona North	Derrimut; Ardeer; Keilor East; Airport West; Thomastown	Greensborough	38 km (24 mi)	Allocated (from Fawkner to Thomastown) when Craigieburn bypass opened in 2005, progressively being replaced by from 2013
M420	Koo Wee Rup Road; Koo Wee Rup Bypass; Rossiter Road; South Gippsland Highway; Bass Highway	Pakenham	Koo Wee Rup; Lang Lang; Grantville	Bass	56 km (35 mi)	– Replaced from Grantville to Bass when highway upgrades along Bass Highway raised quality of road in 2013 – Northern end realigned along South Gippsland Highway from Lynbrook to current alignment (replaced by /) in 2024, signage under conversion on Koo Wee Rup Road from to – Continues west as along Phillip Island Road to Cowes – Concurrency with along Rossiter Road through Koo Wee Rup
M420	South Gippsland Freeway	Doveton		Lynbrook	6 km (4 mi)	– Northern end extended along South Gippsland Freeway from Eumemmerring to Doveton (replacing) when Hallam bypass opened in 2003 – Decommissioned, replaced by in 2025
M780	South Gippsland Freeway; Western Port Highway	Doveton	Lynbrook	Skye	14 km (9 mi)	– Allocated in 2000, replaced – Northern end extended along South Gippsland Freeway from Lynbrook to Doveton (replacing) in 2025, signage under conversion on South Gippsland Freeway from to – Continues south as along Western Port Highway to Hastings
Decommissioned or unsigned route

=== A routes ===
A roads provide a similar high standard of driving conditions usually on a single carriageway, but in practice this means usually a dual-carriageway road within suburban Melbourne. A roads serve the same purpose as M roads, but carry less traffic.

Route	Component roads	From	Via	To	Length	Notes
A1	Princes Highway (west)	VIC/SA border	Heywood; Port Fairy; Warrnambool	Colac	301 km (187 mi)	Highway 1 route: – continues west as along Princes Highway into SA eventually to Mount Gambier – continues east as along Princes Highway (west) through Melbourne to Traralgon – concurrency with along Princes Highway from Heywood to Bolwarra
A1	Princes Highway (east)	Traralgon	Sale; Bairnsdale; Orbost	VIC/NSW border	350 km (217 mi)	Highway 1 route: – continues west as along Princes Highway (east) through Melbourne to Colac – continues north as along Princes Highway into NSW eventually to Sydney
A8	Western Highway	VIC/SA border	Nhill; Horsham; Ararat	Buangor	257 km (160 mi)	– Continues west as along Dukes Highway into SA eventually to Tailem Bend – Continues east as along Western Freeway to Melbourne – Allocated in 1997, progressively being replaced by from 2013
A10	Colac Road; High Street; Settlement Road; Latrobe Terrace; Keera Street; Melbourne Road; Princes Highway	Waurn Ponds	Highton; Belmont; Geelong; Norlane	Corio	20 km (12 mi)	– Allocated when Geelong Ring Road opened (replacing) in 2009 – Former Princes Highway alignment through Geelong
A17	O'Shea Road	Berwick		Beaconsfield	1.6 km (1 mi)	– Allocated in 2022 – Concurrency with along O'Shea Road from Berwick to Beaconsfield
A20	Sturt Highway	VIC/SA border	Mildura	VIC/NSW border	116 km (72 mi)	– Continues west as along Sturt Highway into SA eventually to Adelaide – Continues east as along Sturt Highway into NSW eventually to Tarcutta – Concurrency with along Calder Highway through Mildura – Allocated in 1997, progressively being replaced by from 2013
A21	South Gippsland Highway	Dandenong	Dandenong South; Lynbrook	Cranbourne North	10 km (6 mi)	– Allocated in 2024, signage under conversion from to – Continues south as along South Gippsland Highway to Koo Wee Rup
A21	South Gippsland Highway	Cranbourne	Devon Meadows; Tooradin	Koo Wee Rup	22 km (14 mi)	– Allocated in 2024, signage under conversion from to – Continues north as along South Gippsland Highway to Dandenong
A39	Goulburn Valley Highway	Shepparton	Strathmerton	VIC/NSW border	86 km (53 mi)	– Southern end along Goulburn Valley Freeway originally terminating at Seymour truncated to current alignment (replaced by in 2001, progressively being replaced by from 2013) – Continues north as along Newell Highway into NSW eventually to Goondiwindi – Continues south as along Goulburn Valley Freeway to Seymour – Concurrency with along Murray Valley Highway from Strathmerton to Yarroweyah – Allocated in 1997, progressively being replaced by from 2013
A51	Plenty Road	Mernda	South Morang; Mill Park	Bundoora	9.8 km (6 mi)	– Allocated in 2021 – Continues south as along Plenty Road to Preston – Continues north as along Plenty Road eventually to Wallan
A57	Epping Road; High Street	Wollert		Epping	4.1 km (3 mi)	– Allocated in 2026 – Continues south as along High Street eventually to Elwood – Continues north as along Epping Road eventually to Kilmore
A60	Mount Alexander Road; Flemington Road; Harker Street; Curzon Street; King Street; Kingsway	Essendon	Moonee Ponds; Ascot Vale; Parkville; West Melbourne	Southbank	11.3 km (7 mi)	– Allocated in 2023 to replace between Southbank and Essendon – Extended beyond terminus from Parkville to Essendon along Mount Alexander Road, first appearing in 2019 – Signage slowly under conversion from to
A72	Craigieburn Road	Craigieburn			5.9 km (4 mi)	– Allocated in 2024, signage under conversion from to – Road is entirely within Craigieburn
A79	Calder Highway	VIC/NSW border	Mildura; Ouyen; Charlton; Bendigo	Ravenswood	438 km (272 mi)	– Continues north as along Silver City Highway into NSW eventually to Broken Hill – Continues south as along Calder Freeway to Melbourne – Concurrencies: with along Sturt Highway through Mildura, with along Midland Highway from Bendigo to Ravenswood
A81	Leakes Road	Tarneit	Truganina	Laverton North	8 km (5 mi)	– Allocated in 2020 – Continues east as along Kororoit Creek Road eventually to Somerton
A82	Melton Highway	Keilor	Taylors Lakes; Hillside	Melton South	19 km (12 mi)	– Allocated in 2026 – Replaced along Melton Highway
A91	Robinsons Road; Palmers Road	Ravenhall	Truganina	Williams Landing	8.4 km (5 mi)	– Allocated in 2020 – Continues south as along Palmers/Dunnings Roads to Point Cook
A93	Forsyth Road	Truganina	Williams Landing	Point Cook	4.3 km (3 mi)	Allocated in 2020
A200	Henty Highway	Portland	Heywood; Hamilton; Cavendish	Horsham	214 km (133 mi)	– Continues north as along Henty Highway to Lascelles – Concurrency with along Henty Highway from Heywood to Bolwarra
A300	Midland Highway	Geelong	Ballarat; Castlemaine; Bendigo; Castlemaine; Shepparton	Benalla	397 km (247 mi)	– Continues south as along Midland/Maroondah/Melba Highways to Melbourne – Concurrencies: with along Calder Highway from Bendigo to Ravenswood, with along Calder Freeway from Ravenswood to Harcourt
A404	Narre Warren-Cranbourne Road; Cameron Street	Cranbourne			4 km (2 mi)	– Allocated in 2023 during Narre Warren-Cranbourne Road Upgrade – Road is entirely within Cranbourne – Continues north as along Narre Warren-Cranbourne Road to Lilydale
A420	Bass Highway	Grantville	Glen Forbes	Bass	13.8 km (9 mi)	Decommissioned, replaced by when highway upgrades along Bass Highway raised quality of road in 2013
A440	South Gippsland Highway	Lang Lang	Loch; Korumburra; Leongatha; Foster; Yarram	Sale	206 km (128 mi)	Replaced when highway upgrades along South Gippsland Highway raised quality of road in 2003
A780	Western Port Highway	Skye	Langwarrin; Tyabb	Hastings	20 km (12 mi)	– Northern end along Western Port Highway originally terminating at Lynbrook truncated to current alignment in 2000 (replaced by) – Continues north as along Western Port Highway eventually to Doveton
A790	Calder Alternate Highway	Marong	Lockwood	Ravenswood	20 km (12 mi)	Bendigo bypass route: – continues north as along Calder Highway to Mildura – continues south as along Calder Freeway to Melbourne
Decommissioned or unsigned route

=== B routes ===
B roads are sealed roads wide enough to accommodate two lanes of traffic with good centre line markings, provide adequate shoulders and high quality and visibility signage. B roads are the primary transport links for major regions not connected by either M or A roads, as well as major tourist routes.

Route	Component roads	From	Via	To	Length	Notes
B12	Mallee Highway; Tooleybuc Road	VIC/SA border	Ouyen; Manangatang; Piangil	VIC/NSW border	233 km (145 mi)	– Continues west as along Mallee Highway into SA eventually to Tailem Bend – Continues east (unmarked) along Yanga Way into NSW to Balranald
B21	South Gippsland Highway (I); High Street; South Gippsland Highway (II)	Cranbourne			4.7 km (3 mi)	Allocated in 2024, signage under conversion from to, road is entirely within Cranbourne
B23	Monaro Highway	Cann River		VIC/NSW border	48 km (30 mi)	Continues north as along Monaro Highway into NSW eventually to Canberra
B25	Croydon Road	Croydon			1.3 km (1 mi)	Allocated in 2024, road is entirely within Croydon
B37	Fitzsimons Lane; Williamsons Road	Eltham		Templestowe	3.1 km (2 mi)	– Allocated in 2022, signage under conversion from to – Continues south as along Williamsons Road eventually to Huntingdale – Concurrency with along Williamsons Road through Templestowe
B75	Northern Highway	Wallan	Kilmore; Heathcote; Elmore; Echuca	VIC/NSW border	165 km (103 mi)	Continues north as along Cobb Highway into NSW eventually to Wilcannia
B77	Sayers Road; Old Geelong Road	Tarneit	Williams Landing	Laverton North	8.5 km (5 mi)	– Allocated in 2020 – Continues north as along Fitzgerald Road eventually to Keilor
B91	Palmers Road; Dunnings Road	Williams Landing		Point Cook	2.6 km (2 mi)	– Allocated in 2020 – Continues north as along Palmers/Robinsons Roads to Ravenhall
B94	Dohertys Road; Grieve Parade	Tarneit	Truganina	Altona North	12 km (7 mi)	– Allocated in 2020, signage under conversion from to – Continues east as along Blackshaws Road to Newport
B100	Surf Coast Highway; Great Ocean Road	Belmont	Torquay; Anglesea; Lorne; Apollo Bay; Port Campbell	Allansford	255 km (158 mi)	
B110	McKillop Street; Ormond Road; Bellarine Highway; Flinders Street; Bethune Street; King Street; Hesse Street; Wharf Street	Geelong	Newcomb; Leopold; Marcus Hill	Queenscliff	31 km (19 mi)	Continues east over Port Phillip Bay to Point Nepean Road on Mornington Peninsula
B110	Nepean Highway; Point Nepean Road	Mornington	Dromana; Rosebud; Sorrento	Portsea	42 km (26 mi)	– Re-aligned through Dromana from Mornington Peninsula Freeway to current alignment when Peninsula Link opened in 2013 – Continues west over Port Phillip Bay to Bellarine Highway on Bellarine Peninsula – Continues north as along Nepean Highway eventually to Melbourne
B120	Hopkins Highway	Warrnambool	Ellerslie	Mortlake	50 km (31 mi)	
B121	Barwon Heads Road	Belmont		Marshall	4 km (2.5 mi)	– Allocated in 2023 – Continues south as along Barwon Heads Road eventually to Barwon Heads
B130	Baanip Boulevard	Waurn Ponds		Grovedale	5 km (3 mi)	Allocated in 2015
B140	Hamilton Highway	Hamilton	Penshurst; Mortlake; Cressy	Geelong	231 km (144 mi)	
B160	Glenelg Highway	VIC/SA border	Casterton; Hamilton; Dunkeld; Skipton	Ballarat	289 km (180 mi)	Continues west as along Glenelg Highway into SA to Mount Gambier
B180	Pyrenees Highway	Glenthompson	Ararat; Avoca; Maryborough; Castlemaine	Elphinstone	206 km (128 mi)	
B200	Henty Highway	Lascelles	Warracknabeal	Horsham	231 km (144 mi)	– Continues south as along Henty Highway to Portland – Concurrency with along Wimmera Highway from Horsham to Dooen
B210	Stawell–Warracknabeal Road	Warracknabeal	Rupanyup	Stawell	91 km (57 mi)	Allocated in 2000, replaced
B220	Sunraysia Highway	Ouyen	Lascelles; Birchip; Donald; St Arnaud; Avoca	Ballarat	344 km (214 mi)	
B240	Wimmera Highway	VIC/SA border	Edenhope; Horsham; St Arnaud	Marong	325 km (202 mi)	– Replaced when highway upgrades along Wimmera Highway raised quality of road in 2003 – Continues west as along Wimmera Highway into SA to Naracoorte – Concurrency with along Henty Highway from Horsham to Dooen
B260	Loddon Valley Highway	Kerang	Durham Ox	Bendigo	129 km (80 mi)	
B280	McIvor Highway	Bendigo	Axedale	Heathcote	45 km (28 mi)	
B300	Midland Highway; Goulburn Valley Highway; Maroondah Highway (I); Melba Highway (I); Yarra Glen Bypass; Healesville–Yarra Glen Road; Melba Highway (II); Maroondah Highway (II)	Benalla	Maindample; Merton; Yarck; Yea; Yarra Glen	Lilydale	187 km (116 mi)	– Re-aligned through Yarra Glen from Melba Highway to current alignment (replaced by) when Yarra Glen bypass opened in 2010 – Continues west as along Midland Highway to Geelong – Continues south into Melbourne as Maroondah Highway – Concurrencies: with along Goulburn Valley Highway from Cathkin to Yea; with along Healesville–Yarra Glen Road through Yarra Glen
B320	Maroondah Highway	Maindample		Mansfield	12 km (7 mi)	Continues east as along Mount Buller Road to Mount Buller
B340	Goulburn Valley Highway	Seymour	Yea; Alexandra	Eildon	106 km (66 mi)	Concurrency with along Goulburn Valley Highway from Yea to Cathkin
B360	Maroondah Highway	Alexandra	Healesville	Coldstream	90 km (56 mi)	
B380	Warburton Highway	Lilydale	Seville; Woori Yallock; Yarra Junction	Warburton	75 km (47 mi)	
B400	Murray Valley Highway (I); Hume Freeway; Bandiana Link Road; Murray Valley Highway (II)	VIC/NSW border	Robinvale; Swan Hill; Kerang; Echuca; Yarrawonga; Wodonga; Corryong	VIC/NSW border	663 km (412 mi)	– Re-aligned through Wodonga from High Street, Osburn/Chapple Streets to Bandiana Link Road (replacing) in 2009 – Concurrencies: with along Hume Freeway from Barnawartha North to Wodonga, with along Goulburn Valley Highway from Strathmerton to Yarroweyah
B401	Bandiana Link Road	Wodonga			4.1 km (3 mi)	Decommissioned, replaced by within months, then in 2009
B410	Bandiana Link Road	Wodonga			4.1 km (3 mi)	Decommissioned, replaced by in 2009 (originally allocated as in 2007, changed to within months)
B420	Phillip Island Link Road; Phillip Island Road	Bass	Newhaven	Cowes	23 km (14 mi)	– Eastern end re-aligned through Anderson to current alignment (replaced by) when Anderson bypass opened in 2013 – Continues east as along Bass Highway eventually to Pakenham
B422	Racecourse Road; Healesville–Koo Wee Rup Road	Pakenham			2.4 km (1 mi)	– Allocated in 2025, signage under conversion from to B422 – Road is entirely within Pakenham
B440	South Gippsland Highway	Lang Lang	Loch; Korumburra; Leongatha; Foster; Yarram	Sale	206 km (128 mi)	Decommissioned, replaced by when highway upgrades along South Gippsland Highway raised quality of road in 2003
B460	Bass Highway; Strzelecki Highway	Bass	Wonthaggi; Leongatha; Mirboo North	Morwell	113 km (70 mi)	Northern end extended along Bass Highway from Anderson to Bass (replacing) when Anderson bypass opened in 2013
B500	Great Alpine Road	Wangaratta	Myrtleford; Bright; Omeo; Bruthen	Bairnsdale	304 km (189 mi)	
B664	Rutherford Road; Lathams Road; Hall Road	Seaford	Carrum Downs; Skye	Cranbourne West	9.2 km (6 mi)	Allocated in 2023
B668	Pound Road; Narre Warren–Cranbourne Road; Greaves Road; O'Shea Road	Hampton Park	Narre Warren South; Berwick	Beaconsfield	10.8 km (7 mi)	– Allocated in 2019 – Eastern end extended from Berwick to Beaconsfield when O'Shea Road extension opened in 2022 – Concurrencies: with along Narre Warren-Cranbourne Road through Narre Warren South; with along O'Shea Road from Berwick to Beaconsfield
B675	Hallam North Road; Belgrave–Hallam Road; Hallam South Road; Hallam Road	Endeavour Hills	Hallam	Hampton Park	9 km (6 mi)	Allocated in 2020
B716	O'Herns Road	Epping			3 km (2 mi)	Allocated in 2019, road is entirely within Epping
B720	Bridge Inn Road	Mernda		Doreen	3.8 km (2 mi)	Allocated in 2024, signage under conversion from to B720
B980	Centre Dandenong Road	Dingley Village			0.7 km (0 mi)	Allocated in 2021, road is entirely within Dingley Village
Decommissioned or unsigned route

=== C routes ===
C roads are generally sealed two-lane roads with shoulders and serve as important links between population centres and the primary transport network.

==== C101 to C198 ====
Route	Component roads	From	Via	To	Length	Notes
C101	Princes Highway	Narre Warren	Berwick; Pakenham	Nar Nar Goon	23 km (14 mi)	– Loop route – Former Princes Highway alignment – Eastern end extended along Princes Highway from Beaconsfield to Nar Nar Goon when Pakenham bypass opened (replacing) in 2007 – Continues west as along Princes Highway eventually to Southbank
C102	Princes Way	Drouin West	Drouin; Warragul	Nilma	16 km (10 mi)	– Loop route – Former Princes Highway alignment
C103	Lloyd Street; Narracan Drive; John Field Drive; Brown Coalmine Road; Glengarry–Tyers Road	Moe	Yallourn North; Tyers	Glengarry	33 km (21 mi)	– Loop route – Former Princes Highway alignment between Moe and Newborough
C104	Princes Drive	Morwell			8 km (5 mi)	– Loop route – Former Princes Highway alignment
C105	Traralgon–Maffra Road; Stratford–Maffra Road	Traralgon	Glengarry; Heyfield; Maffra	Stratford	68 km (42 mi)	
C106	Bengworden Road	Sale	Bengworden	Bairnsdale	68 km (42 mi)	
C107	Marlo Road; Marlo–Conran Road	Orbost	Marlo	Cape Conran	32 km (20 mi)	
C108	Duncans Road	Werribee		Werribee South	9 km (6 mi)	
C109	Geelong Road; Synnot Street; Princes Highway	Cocoroc	Werribee	Hoppers Crossing	9 km (6 mi)	– Loop route – Former Princes Highway alignment through Werribee
C111	Fyansford–Gheringhap Road; Friend in Hand Road; Ceres Road; Merrawarp Road; Barrabool Road; Devon Road	Gheringhap	Ceres; Barrabool	Mt. Moriac	9 km (6 mi)	
C112	West Fyans Street; Fyans Street; Carr Street	Newtown		Whittington	5 km (3 mi)	Geelong suburban road
C114	Forrest Road	Lara		Corio	4 km (2 mi)	Geelong suburban road
C115	Shell Parade; Seabeach Parade; Corio Quay Road	Corio	North Shore	Geelong North	8.4 km (5 mi)	Geelong suburban road
C116	Morgan Street; The Boulevard; North Shore Road; Station Street	North Geelong	North Shore	Corio	5 km (3 mi)	Unsigned
C117	Separation Street	Bell Post Hill		North Geelong	2 km (1 mi)	Unsigned
C118	Cox Road; Anakie Road; Vines Road; McCurdy Road	Norlane	Bell Post Hill	Herne Hill	8 km (5 mi)	Geelong suburban road
C119	Birregurra Road; Birregurra–Forrest Road; Forrest–Apollo Bay Road; Skenes Creek Road	Birregurra	Forrest	Skenes Creek	63 km (39 mi)	
C121	Barwon Heads Road; Hitchcock Avenue	Marshall	Connewarre	Barwon Heads	16 km (10 mi)	– Northern end truncated to Marshall when Barwon Heads Road Upgrade Stage 1 completed in 2023 – Continues north as along Barwon Heads Road eventually to Belmont
C122	Lower Duneed Road	Mt. Duneed		Connewarre	5 km (3 mi)	
C123	Ryrie Street; Geelong–Portarlington Road; Drysdale Bypass; Newcombe Street	Geelong	Drysdale	Portarlington	30 km (19 mi)	– Realigned from High Street, Drysdale to Drysdale Bypass when road was completed in June 2020
C124	Breakwater Road; Fellmongers Road; Boundary Road	Belmont		Newcomb	5 km (3 mi)	
C125	Hood Road; The Esplanade; Drysdale–St Leonards Road	Drysdale	St Leonards	Portarlington	23 km (14 mi)	
C126	Fisher Street; Portarlington–Queenscliff Road	Portarlington		Point Lonsdale	17 km (11 mi)	
C127	Point Lonsdale Road	Point Lonsdale			3 km (2 mi)	
C129	Barwon Heads–Ocean Grove Road; Orton Street; The Parade; Tuckfield Street; Grubb Road; Drysdale–Ocean Grove Road	Barwon Heads	Ocean Grove	Drysdale	14 km (9 mi)	
C132	Bells Boulevard; Bells Beach Road	Jan Juc		Bells Beach	4 km (2 mi)	
C133	South Valley Road; Pioneer Road	Highton		Grovedale	5 km (3 mi)	
C134	Anglesea Road	Waurn Ponds	Mount Duneed	Bellbrae	14 km (9 mi)	Northern end along Anglesea Road originally terminating through Waurn Ponds truncated to current alignment (replaced by) when Stage 4B of Geelong Ring Road opened in 2013
C135	Cape Otway Road; Hendy Main Road	Mt. Moriac	Moriac	Bellbrae	20 km (12 mi)	
C136	Barrabool Road; Shannon Avenue; Thompson Road; Cox Road	Ceres	Belmont	Corio	18 km (11 mi)	
C137	Fyansford–Gheringhap Road	Stonehaven		Fyansford	4 km (2 mi)	
C138	Hepburn Springs Road	Daylesford		Hepburn Springs	4 km (2 mi)	
C141	Ballan–Daylesford Road; Geelong–Ballan Road	Daylesford	Ballan; Anakie	Batesford	93 km (58 mi)	
C142	Steiglitz Road	Meredith	Steiglitz; Moorabool; Sutherlands Creek	Moorabool	38 km (24 mi)	
C143	Rokewood–Skipton Road; Rokewood–Shelford Road; Shelford–Bannockburn Road	Skipton	Rokewood; Shelford	Bannockburn	87 km (54 mi)	
C144	Inverleigh–Shelford Road	Inverleigh		Shelford	10 km (6 mi)	
C145	Inverleigh–Winchelsea Road	Inverleigh		Winchelsea	18 km (11 mi)	
C146	Colac–Ballarat Road	Magpie	Rokewood; Cressy; Beeac	Colac East	89 km (55 mi)	
C147	Cororooke Road	Beeac		Colac West	23 km (14 mi)	
C148	Mortlake–Ararat Road	Maroona	Lake Colac	Mortlake	74 km (46 mi)	
C149	Cobden–Stonyford Road	Cobden		Stonyford	24 km (15 mi)	
C151	Winchelsea–Deans Marsh Road; Deans Marsh–Lorne Road	Winchelsea	Deans Marsh	Lorne	45 km (28 mi)	
C152	Warncoort–Birregurra Road; Birregurra–Deans Marsh Road	Warncoort	Birregurra	Deans Marsh	21 km (13 mi)	
C154	Colac–Forrest Road	Colac		Forrest	32 km (20 mi)	
C155	Colac–Lavers Hill Road	Colac	Ferguson	Lavers Hill	56 km (35 mi)	
C156	Terang–Mortlake Road; Cobden–Terang Road; Lavers Hill–Cobden Road	Mortlake	Terang; Cobden; Simpson	Lavers Hill	106 km (66 mi)	
C157	Otway Lighthouse Road	Cape Otway			12 km (7 mi)	
C158	McKinnons Bridge–Noorat Road	Noorat		Boorcan	6 km (4 mi)	
C159	Beech Forest Road	Ferguson		Haines Junction	22 km (14 mi)	
C161	Carlisle–Colac Road; Gellibrand River Road	Elliminyt	Carlisle River	Chapple Vale	51 km (32 mi)	
C162	Timboon–Port Campbell Road	Timboon		Newfield	8 km (5 mi)	
C163	Timboon–Colac Road; Timboon–Nullawarre Road	Pirron Yallock	Timboon	Nullawarre	76 km (47 mi)	
C164	Foxhow Road; Camperdown–Lismore Road; Camperdown–Cobden Road; Cobden-Terang Road; Cobden-Port Campbell Road	Cressy	Camperdown; Cobden	Port Campbell	99 km (62 mi)	
C165	Camperdown–Lismore Road	Lismore		Chocolyn	30 km (19 mi)	
C166	Princetown Road	Simpson		Princetown	27 km (17 mi)	
C167	Cobden–Warrnambool Road	Allansford		Cobden	42 km (26 mi)	
C168	Ayresford Road	Terang		Nirranda East	25 km (16 mi)	
C169	Bridge Road	Woodford		Bushfield	4 km (2 mi)	Unsigned
C171	Lismore–Scarsdale Road	Scarsdale	Pitfield	Lismore	43 km (27 mi)	
C172	Lexton–Talbot Road; Beaufort–Lexton Road; Skipton Road; Lismore–Skipton Road	Talbot	Lexton; Beaufort; Skipton	Lismore	109 km (68 mi)	
C173	Darlington Road	Darlington		Gnotuk	25 km (16 mi)	
C174	Warrnambool–Caramut Road	Caramut	Woolsthorpe	Warrnambool	52 km (32 mi)	
C175	Koroit–Woolsthorpe Road	Koroit		Woolsthorpe	11 km (7 mi)	
C176	Woolsthorpe–Heywood Road	Heywood	Homerton; Broadwater	Woolsthorpe	76 km (47 mi)	Concurrency with along Woolsthorpe–Heywood Road from Heywood to Homerton
C177	Penshurst–Warrnambool Road	Southern Cross		Illowa	7 km (4 mi)	
C178	Penshurst–Dunkeld Road; Penshurst–Warrnambool Road; Penshurst–Port Fairy Road	Dunkeld	Penshurst; Hawkesdale	Killarney	81 km (50 mi)	
C179	Koroit–Port Fairy Road	Koroit		Killarney	7 km (4 mi)	
C182	Rossbridge–Streatham Road	Rossbridge		Streatham	30 km (19 mi)	
C183	Mailors Flat–Koroit Road; Penshurst–Warrnambool Road; Spencer Road	Woodford	Koroit	Tarrone	29 km (18 mi)	
C184	Hamilton–Port Fairy Road	Hamilton	Macarthur	Port Fairy	81 km (50 mi)	
C185	Macarthur–Penshurst Road	Macarthur		Penshurst	36 km (22 mi)	
C186	Myamyn–Macarthur Road	Myamyn		Macarthur	23 km (14 mi)	
C187	Dartmoor–Hamilton Road	Dartmoor	Digby	Hamilton	73 km (45 mi)	
C188	Natimuk–Hamilton Road; Dunkeld–Cavendish Road	Balmoral	Cavendish	Dunkeld	67 km (42 mi)	
C191	Woolsthorpe–Heywood Road; Tyrendarra–Ettrick Road	Heywood	Homerton	Tyrendarra	21.4 km (13 mi)	Concurrency with along Woolsthorpe–Heywood Road from Heywood to Homerton
C192	Portland–Nelson Road; Glenelg River Road	Portland	Nelson	Mount Gambier, SA	100 km (62 mi)	Continues west as along Glenelg River Road into SA to Mount Gambier
C193	Bridgewater Road	Portland		Cape Bridgewater	17 km (11 mi)	
C194	Madeira Packet Road	Portland			15 km (9 mi)	Portland city circle road
C195	Portland–Casterton Road	Heywood	Digby; Merino	Casterton	67 km (42 mi)	
C196	Coleraine–Merino Road	Coleraine		Merino	22 km (14 mi)	
C198	Casterton–Penola Road; Casterton Road	Casterton	Lake Mundi	Penola, SA	58 km (36 mi)	Continues west as along Casterton Road into SA to Penola
Decommissioned or unsigned route

==== C203 to C298 ====
Route	Component roads	From	Via	To	Length	Notes
C203	Coleraine–Balmoral Road	Coleraine		Balmoral	47 km (29 mi)	
C204	Harrow–Balmoral Road	Harrow South		Balmoral	20 km (12 mi)	
C205	Wombelano Road	Kanagulk		Wombelano	30 km (19 mi)	
C206	Coleraine–Edenhope Road; Nhill–Harrow Road	Coleraine	Harrow; Miga Lake; Gymbowen	Nhill	154 km (96 mi)	
C207	Casterton–Edenhope Road	Casterton		Edenhope	75 km (47 mi)	
C208	Coleraine–Edenhope Road	Harrow		Edenhope	34 km (21 mi)	
C211	Casterton–Aspley Road	Casterton		Apsley	86 km (53 mi)	
C212	Edenhope–Penola Road; Edenhope Road	Edenhope	Langkoop	Wrattonbully, SA	46 km (29 mi)	Continues west as along Edenhope Road into SA to Wrattonbully
C213	Natimuk–Frances Road	Natimuk	Gymbowen; Goroke; Minimay	Frances, SA	92 km (57 mi)	Terminates outside Frances, but does not cross VIC/SA border
C214	Horsham–Noradjuha Road; Natimuk–Hamilton Road	Horsham West		Balmoral	69 km (43 mi)	
C215	Horsham–Lubeck Road; Ballyglunin North Road	Horsham	Drung	Bungalally	19 km (12 mi)	
C216	Grampians Road	Dunkeld	Halls Gap	Stawell	89 km (55 mi)	
C217	Victoria Valley Road	Dunkeld		Yarram Gap	34 km (21 mi)	
C218	Silverband Road	Bellfield		Halls Gap	8 km (5 mi)	
C219	Natimuk–Hamilton Road	Natimuk		Noradjuha	12 km (7 mi)	
C221	Pomonal Road; Stawell–Avoca Road	Pomonal	Stawell	Moonambel	88 km (55 mi)	
C222	Ararat–Halls Gap Road; Mount Victory Road; Northern Grampians Road	Ararat	Moyston; Pomonal; Halls Gap	Bungalally	104 km (65 mi)	
C223	Nhill–Jeparit Road	Nhill		Jeparit	41 km (25 mi)	
C224	Nhill–Netherby Road	Nhill		Netherby	25 km (16 mi)	
C225	Nhill–Yanac Road	Nhill		Yanac	32 km (20 mi)	
C226	Serviceton North–Telopea Downs Road	Serviceton		Telopea Downs	24 km (15 mi)	Gravel road
C227	Dimboola–Rainbow Rd; Hopetoun–Rainbow Rd	Dimboola	Antwerp; Jeparit; Rainbow	Hopetoun	117 km (73 mi)	
C228	Wartook Road	Zumsteins		Wartook	3.3 km (2 mi)	Gravel road
C229	Jeparit–Warracknabeal Road	Jeparit		Crymelon	25 km (16 mi)	
C231	Blue Ribbon Road	Wallup		Horsham	42 km (26 mi)	
C234	Borung Highway (west)	Dimboola	Warracknabeal	Litchfield	83 km (52 mi)	
C235	Stawell–Warracknabeal Road	Warracknabeal	Rupanyup	Stawell	91 km (57 mi)	Decommissioned, replaced by in 2000
C236	Horsham–Minyip Road; Donald–Murtoa Road	Horsham North	Minyip	Donald	59 km (37 mi)	
C237	Donald–Murtoa Road; Murtoa–Glenorchy Road	Kewell	Murtoa	Glenorchy	48 km (30 mi)	
C238	Donald–Stawell Road	Donald	Marnoo	Stawell	87 km (54 mi)	
C239	Borung Highway (east)	Charlton		Donald	32 km (20 mi)	
C240	Wimmera Highway	VIC/SA border	Edenhope; Horsham; St Arnaud	Marong	325 km (202 mi)	Decommissioned, replaced by when highway upgrades along Wimmera Highway raised quality of road in 2003
C241	Ararat–St Arnaud Road	Dunneworthy	Navarre	St Arnaud	70 km (43 mi)	
C242	Warracknabeal–Birchip Road	Warracknabeal		Morton Plains	49 km (30 mi)	
C243	Birchip–Rainbow Road	Ballapur	Beulah	Rainbow	78 km (48 mi)	
C244	Birchip–Sea Lake Road	Banyan		Birchip	50 km (31 mi)	
C245	Rainbow Road; Warracknabeal–Rainbow Road	Warracknabeal	Willenabrina	Rainbow	51 km (32 mi)	
C246	Hopetoun–Sea Lake Road; Birchip–Sea Lake Road; Sea Lake–Swan Hill Road	Hopetoun	Woomelang; Sea Lake; Ultima	Swan Hill	128 km (80 mi)	Concurrency with along Calder Highway in Sea Lake
C247	Hopetoun–Walpeup Road	Hopetoun	Patchewollock	Walpeup	81 km (50 mi)	
C248	Patchewollock–Sea Lake Road	Patchewollock	Speed	Ninda	53 km (33 mi)	Gravel road
C251	Robinvale–Sea Lake Road	Robinvale	Manangatang	Sea Lake	109 km (68 mi)	
C252	Hattah–Robinvale Road	Hattah	Bannerton	Lake Powell	62 km (39 mi)	
C253	Kulkyne Way	Red Cliffs	Nangiloc	Colignan	35 km (22 mi)	
C254	Millewa Road	Meringur	Werrimull	Red Cliffs	80 km (50 mi)	
C255	Benetook Avenue	Mildura			4 km (2 mi)	Road is entirely within Mildura
C256	Ranfurly Way	Merbein		Mildura	13 km (8 mi)	
C257	Leitchville–Kerang Road	Leitchville			5 km (3 mi)	Road is entirely within Leitchville
C259	Airport Road	Kerang			1.9 km (1 mi)	Unsigned, road is entirely within Kerang
C261	Donald–Swan Hill Rd	Donald	Lalbert	Swan Hill	130 km (81 mi)	Concurrency with along Calder Highway in Dumosa
C262	Dumosa–Quambatook Rd; Kerang–Quambatook Rd	Tittybong	Quambatook	Kerang	49 km (30 mi)	
C263	Kerang–Murrabit Rd	Kerang		Murrabit	27 km (17 mi)	
C264	Kerang–Koondrook Rd	Kerang		Koondrook	26 km (16 mi)	
C265	Cohuna–Koondrook Rd	Cohuna		Koondrook	19 km (12 mi)	
C266	Boort–Charlton Rd; Boort–Kerang Rd	Charlton	Boort	Kerang	96 km (60 mi)	
C267	Boort–Wycheproof Rd; Boort–Pyramid Rd; Leitchville–Pyramid Rd; Cohuna–Leitchville Rd	Wycheproof	Boort; Pyramid Hill; Leitchville	Cohuna	126 km (78 mi)	
C268	Birchip–Wycheproof Rd	Birchip		Wycheproof	33 km (21 mi)	
C271	St Arnaud–Wycheproof Rd	St Arnaud		Wycheproof South	57 km (35 mi)	
C272	Charlton–St Arnaud Rd	Charlton		St Arnaud	42 km (26 mi)	
C273	Boort–Wedderburn Rd; Logan–Wedderburn Rd	Boort	Korong Vale; Wedderburn	Logan	67 km (42 mi)	Concurrency with along Calder Highway in Wedderburn
C274	Bridgewater–Serpentine Rd; Bridgewater–Dunolly Rd	Serpentine	Bridgewater on Loddon; Tarnagulla	Dunolly	58 km (36 mi)	
C275	Maryborough–St Arnaud Rd	Maryborough		Moyreisk	41 km (25 mi)	
C276	Dunolly–Eddington Rd	Dunolly		Eddington	10 km (6 mi)	
C277	Lockwood Rd; Bendigo–Maryborough Rd; Maryborough-Dunolly Rd	Bendigo	Eddington	Maryborough	63 km (39 mi)	
C278	Maryborough–Dunolly Rd; Dunolly–Moliagul Rd	Maryborough	Dunolly	Moliagul	28 km (17 mi)	
C282	Castlemaine–Maldon Road; Bridgewater–Maldon Road	Castlemaine	Maldon	Bridgewater on Loddon	63 km (39 mi)	
C283	Creswick–Newstead Road; Maldon–Newstead Road; Bendigo–Maldon Road	Creswick	Newstead; Maldon	Bendigo	80 km (50 mi)	
C285	Daylesford–Newstead Road	Daylesford North		Newstead	18 km (11 mi)	
C287	Ballarat–Maryborough Road	Ballarat	Clunes; Talbot	Maryborough	61 km (38 mi)	
C288	Dunach–Eddington Road; McCallums Creek Road; Carisbrook–Eddington Road	Dunach	Carisbrook	Eddington	38 km (24 mi)	
C291	Bungaree–Wallace Road; Bungaree–Creswick Road; Melbourne Road; Creswick Road	Wallace	Bungaree; Creswick	Clunes	42 km (26 mi)	
C292	Ballarat–Daylesford Road	Ballarat		Newlyn	22 km (14 mi)	
C294	Barkly Street; Main Road; Geelong Road	Ballarat East	Mount Clear	Buninyong	10 km (6 mi)	Concurrency with along Barkly Street through Ballarat
C295	Bridge Street; Whitehorse Road	Sebastopol		Mount Clear	3 km (2 mi)	Ballarat suburban road
C296	Ballarat–Carngham Road	Ballarat	Bunkers Hill	Carngham	24 km (15 mi)	
C297	Eyre Street; Grant Street	Ballarat		Golden Point	1.8 km (1 mi)	Unsigned, Ballarat suburban road
C298	Barkly Street	Ballarat East			1.1 km (1 mi)	– Unsigned, Ballarat suburban road: Concurrency with along Barkly Street through Ballarat
Decommissioned or unsigned route

==== C305 to C392 ====
Route	Component roads	From	Via	To	Length	Notes
C305	Drummond Street	Ballarat			3 km (2 mi)	Ballarat suburban road
C306	Norman Street	Wendouree			2.3 km (1 mi)	Unsigned, Ballarat suburban road
C307	LaTrobe Street; Gillies Street; Wiltshire Lane	Wendouree		Delacombe	8.8 km (5 mi)	Ballarat suburban road
C308	Barnard Street	Bendigo			0.3 km (0 mi)	Unsigned, Bendigo suburban road
C311	Broadford–Kilmore Road	Broadford		Kilmore	12 km (7 mi)	Loop route Former Hume Highway alignment
C312	Clifton Street	Euroa			4 km (2 mi)	Loop route Road is entirely within Euroa
C313	Sydney Road	Benalla			9 km (6 mi)	Loop route Road is entirely within Benalla
C314	Glenrowan Road; Tone Road; Bowser Road	Wangaratta			15 km (9 mi)	Loop route Road is entirely within Wangaratta
C315	Beechworth–Wangaratta Road; Beechworth–Wodonga Road; Beechworth Road; Victoria Cross Parade	Tarrawingee	Beechworth	Wodonga	63 km (39 mi)	
C316	Daylesford–Malmsbury Road	Daylesford	Denver	Malmsbury	26 km (16 mi)	
C317	Daylesford–Trentham Road; Kyneton–Trentham Road; Tylden–Woodend Road	Daylesford	Trentham; Tylden	Woodend	43 km (27 mi)	Concurrency with along Kyneton–Trentham Road from Trentham to Tylden
C318	Kyneton–Trentham Road; Greendale–Trentham Road; Greendale–Myrniong Road	Kyneton	Tylden; Trentham; Greendale	Myrniong	51 km (32 mi)	Concurrency with along Kyneton–Trentham Road from Tylden to Trentham
C319	Lincoln Causeway	VIC/NSW border		Wodonga	3 km (2 mi)	Loop route Former Hume Highway alignment
C320	Mount Buller Road	Mansfield		Mount Buller	47 km (29 mi)	Continues west as along Maroondah Highway to Maindample
C322	Mount Macedon Road	Gisborne	Macedon; Mount Macedon	Woodend	16 km (10 mi)	
C323	Creeth Street; Sparrowhawk Road; Stray Street; Inglis Street; Specimen Hill Road; MacKenzie Street West; Oak Street	Long Gully		Golden Square	5 km (3 mi)	Bendigo suburban road.
C324	Romsey Road; Rochford Road; Lancefield–Kilmore Road	Woodend	Lancefield	Kilmore	44 km (27 mi)	
C325	Lancefield Road; Melbourne–Lancefield Road; Lancefield–Tooborac Road	Sunbury	Monegeetta; Romsey; Lancefield	Tooborac	65 km (40 mi)	
C326	Heathcote–Redesdale Road; Heathcote–Kyneton Road	Heathcote	Redesdale	Kyneton	49 km (30 mi)	
C327	Lyell Road; Strathfieldsaye Road; Condon Street	Redesdale	Strathfieldsaye	Kennington	43 km (27 mi)	
C328	Cameron Drive	Mount Macedon			4 km (2 mi)	Gravel road – Mt Macedon main road.
C329	Chapel Street; Bridge Street; Arnold Street; Holmes Road; Sandhurst Road	Bendigo		California Gully	4 km (2 mi)	Bendigo suburban road.
C331	Myrtle Street	Bendigo		Quarry Hill	1 km (1 mi)	Bendigo suburban road.
C332	Wills Street; Myers Street	Bendigo			1.5 km (1 mi)	Unsigned, Bendigo suburban road
C333	Holdsworth Road; Lyons Street	Long Gully		White Hills	5 km (3 mi)	Bendigo suburban road.
C334	Boort–Mitiamo Road; Echuca–Mitiamo Road	Jarklin	Mitiamo	Echuca	72 km (45 mi)	
C335	Weeroona Avenue; Lucan Street; Barnard Street; Eaglehawk Road	Bendigo			2 km (1 mi)	Bendigo suburban road.
C336	Sailors Gully Road; Bendigo–Pyramid Road	Eaglehawk	Raywood	Mitiamo	59 km (37 mi)	
C337	Elmore–Raywood Road	Elmore		Raywood	39 km (24 mi)	
C338	Bendigo–Tennyson Road	Huntly		Pine Grove	52 km (32 mi)	
C339	Mitchell Street	Bendigo			1 km (1 mi)	Unsigned, Bendigo suburban road
C341	Prairie–Rochester Road	Prairie		Ballendella	41 km (25 mi)	
C342	Lockington Road	Lockington		Kotta	11 km (7 mi)	
C343	Powells Avenue; Strickland Road; Rohs Road; Heywood Street (alternate route); Lyons Street (alternate route); Heinz Street; Hamelin Street	Strathdale		White Hills	5 km (3 mi)	Bendigo suburban road.
C344	Heathcote–Nagambie Road	Heathcote		Nagambie	48 km (30 mi)	
C345	Bendigo–Murchison Road; Murchison–Violet Town Road	Goornong	Murchison	Violet Town	108 km (67 mi)	
C346	Avenel–Nagambie Road	Avenel		Tabilk	13 km (8 mi)	
C347	Heathcote–Rochester Road	Ladys Pass	Colbinabbin; Corop	Rochester	54 km (34 mi)	
C348	Curr Road; Girgarre–Rushworth Road	Girgarre	Stanhope	Rushworth	26 km (16 mi)	
C349	High Street; Warren Street	Echuca			3 km (2 mi)	Echuca suburban road.
C351	McKenzie Road; Graham Road; Lancaster Road; Lancaster–Mooroopna Road	Echuca	Kyabram	Mooroopna North	57 km (35 mi)	
C352	Henderson Road	Tongala			11 km (7 mi)	Road is entirely within Tongala.
C353	Oak Street; Hattam Street; Adam Street; Gladstone Street; Russell Street; Olinda Street; Pyke Street; Miller Street; Townsend Street; Condon Street; Reservoir Road	Golden Square		Strathdale	8 km (5 mi)	Bendigo suburban road.
C354	Brewer Rd; Byrneside–Kyabram Rd	Byrneside	Merrigum	Lancaster	15 km (9 mi)	
C355	Hawdon Rd; Echuca Rd	Wyuna		Mooroopna	34 km (21 mi)	
C356	Rushworth–Tatura Rd	Rushworth		Tatura	27 km (17 mi)	
C357	Wahring–Murchison East Rd; Murchison–Tatura Rd; Tatura–Undera Rd	Wahring	Murchison; Tatura	Undera	47 km (29 mi)	
C358	Barmah–Shepparton Rd	Barmah		Shepparton North	58 km (36 mi)	
C359	John Allan Rd	Kyabram		Wyuna	12 km (7 mi)	
C361	Katamatite–Yarrawonga Rd; Katamatite–Nathalia Rd	Yarrawonga	Katamatite; Numurkah	Nathalia	80 km (50 mi)	
C362	McEwen Rd; Webb Rd	Kyabram		Rochester	35 km (22 mi)	
C363	Katamatite–Shepparton Rd	Katamatite	Invergordon	Congupna	42 km (26 mi)	
C364	New Dookie Rd; Dookie–Devenish Rd	Shepparton	Dookie	Devenish	45 km (28 mi)	
C365	Dookie–Nalinga Rd; Dookie–Violet Town Rd	Dookie		Violet Town	36 km (22 mi)	
C366	Central Kialla Rd; Euroa–Shepparton Rd; Euroa–Mansfield Rd; Merton–Euroa Rd	Kialla	Euroa	Merton	71 km (44 mi)	
C367	Cobram–Koonoomoo Rd	Cobram		Koonoomoo	7 km (4 mi)	
C368	Cobram South Rd	Cobram		Muckatah	7 km (4 mi)	
C369	Toolamba Rd; River Rd	Mooroopna	Toolamba	Murchison	27 km (17 mi)	
C370	Broadway St; Mookarii St	Cobram		VIC/NSW border	3 km (2 mi)	Road is entirely within Cobram.
C371	Benalla–Tocumwal Road	Yarroweyah	Katamatite	Goorambat	68 km (42 mi)	
C372	Tungamah Main Road	Youarang		Tungamah	21 km (13 mi)	
C373	Benalla–Yarrawonga Road	Yarrawonga	Wilby	Benalla	69 km (43 mi)	
C374	Wangaratta–Yarrawonga Road; Edwards Street; Evans Street; Green Street; Rowan Street; Reid Street	Esmond	Peechelba	Wangaratta	36 km (22 mi)	
C375	All Saints Road; Federation Way	VIC/NSW border	Wahgunyah	Bowser	38 km (24 mi)	
C376	Rutherglen–Wahgunyah Road; Rutherglen–Springhurst Road	Wahgunyah	Rutherglen	Springhurst	21 km (13 mi)	
C377	Chiltern–Rutherglen Road; Beechworth–Chiltern Road	Rutherglen	Chiltern	Beechworth	41 km (25 mi)	
C378	Barnawatha Road	Browns Plains		Barnawartha	6 km (4 mi)	
C381	Chiltern–Howlong Road	VIC/NSW border	Browns Plains	Chiltern	22 km (14 mi)	
C382	Strath Creek Road; Broadford–Flowerdale Road	Broadford	Strath Creek	Flowerdale	30 km (19 mi)	
C383	Upper Goulburn Road	Tallarook		Trawool	13 km (8 mi)	
C384	Seymour–Tooborac Road; Emily Street	Tooborac	Puckapunyal	Seymour	33 km (21 mi)	
C391	Grahamvale Road; Doyles Road; River Road	Congupna	Grahamvale; Shepparton	Kialla	23 km (14 mi)	Loop route Former Shepparton bypass route
C392	O'Dwyer Road; High Street; Grimwade Road	Nagambie		Tablik	12 km (7 mi)	Loop route Former Goulburn Valley Highway alignment
Decommissioned or unsigned route

==== C401 to C498 ====
Route	Component roads	From	Via	To	Length	Notes
C401	Swansea Road	Montrose		Lilydale	6 km (4 mi)	Continues west into Melbourne as Canterbury Road
C402	York Road; Monbulk Road; Clegg Road	Montrose	Mount Evelyn	Wandin North	8 km (5 mi)	Concurrency with along Monbulk Road through Mount Evelyn
C403	Ridge Road	Kalorama		Mount Dandenong	4 km (2 mi)	
C404	Narre Warren–Cranbourne Road; Narre Warren North Road; Belgrave–Hallam Road; Monbulk Road; Hereford Road	Cranbourne North	Narre Warren; Belgrave; Monbulk; Mount Evelyn	Lilydale	47 km (29 mi)	– Southern end truncated to current alignment in 2023, replaced by through Cranbourne – Concurrencies: with along Monbulk Road through Mount Evelyn, with along Narre Warren-Cranbourne Road through Narre Warren South – Continues south as along Narre Warren-Cranbourne Road to Cranbourne
C405	Monbulk–Seville Road	Monbulk		Seville	12 km (7 mi)	
C406	Beaconsfield–Emerald Road; Emerald–Monbulk Road; Olinda–Monbulk Road	Beaconsfield	Emerald; Monbulk	Olinda	36 km (22 mi)	
C407	Clyde Road; Berwick–Cranbourne Road	Berwick	Clyde	Cranbourne	14 km (9 mi)	
C411	Pakenham Road; Healesville–Koo Wee Rup Road; Woori Yallock Road	Pakenham	Cockatoo; Yellingbo; Woori Yallock	Healesville	53 km (33 mi)	
C412	Burwood Highway; Belgrave–Gembrook Road	Upper Ferntree Gully	Belgrave; Emerald; Cockatoo	Gembrook	28 km (17 mi)	Continues west into Melbourne as Burwood Highway
C413	Wellington Road	Rowville	Lysterfield; Narre Warren East	Clematis	21 km (13 mi)	Continues west into Melbourne as Wellington Road
C415	Mount Dandenong Tourist Road	Upper Ferntree Gully	Olinda; Mount Dandenong	Montrose	22 km (14 mi)	Continues west into Melbourne as Ferntree Gully Road
C417	Cardinia Road	Officer			2 km (1 mi)	Unsigned, road is entirely within Officer
C418	Loch Valley Road	Noojee		Loch Valley	6 km (4 mi)	Gravel road
C419	Koo Wee Rup Road; Station Street, Koo Wee Rup; Sybella Avenue	Koo Wee Rup			5 km (3 mi)	Unsigned, replaced along Healesville-Koo Wee Rup Road when Koo Wee Rup Bypass opened in 2015
C421	Rossiter Road; Koo Wee Rup–Longwarry Road; Sand Road	Koo Wee Rup		Longwarry	37 km (23 mi)	Concurrency with along Rossiter Road through Koo Wee Rup
C422	Racecourse Road; Healesville–Koo Wee Rup Road	Pakenham			2.4 km (1 mi)	– Southern end re-aligned through Koo Wee Rup to current alignment (replaced by) when Koo Wee Rup Bypass opened in 2015 – Southern end along Koo Wee Rup Road terminating at Koo Wee Rup truncated to current alignment in 2024 (replaced by) – Decommissioned, replaced by B422 in 2025
C423	Clyde–Five Ways Road; Twyford Road; Ballarto Road	Clyde	Cardinia	Bayles	23 km (14 mi)	
C424	Gembrook Road; Gembrook–Launching Place Road	Pakenham Upper	Gembrook	Launching Place	34 km (21 mi)	
C425	Warragul–Korumburra Road; Victoria Street; Brandy Creek Road; Main Neerim Road; Yarra Junction–Noojee Road	Korumburra	Warragul; Neerim South; Noojee; Powelltown	Yarra Junction	114 km (71 mi)	
C426	Old Sale Road; Main Neerim Road; Mount Baw Baw Tourist Road	Drouin West	Neerim South; Noojee; Tanjil Bren	Mount Baw Baw	89 km (55 mi)	
C427	Main Neerim Road	Drouin West		Drouin	4 km (2 mi)	
C429	McDonalds Track	Lang Lang			1.5 km (1 mi)	Unsigned, road is entirely within Lang Lang
C431	Westernport Road	Drouin South	Ripplebrook	Lang Lang	30 km (19 mi)	
C432	Main South Road; Drouin–Korumburra Road	Drouin	Poowong	Ranceby	36 km (22 mi)	
C433	Wellwood Road; Longwarry–Drouin Road; Drouin Road; Nar Nar Goon–Longwarry Road	Drouin	Longwarry; Bunyip; Garfield	Nar Nar Goon	27 km (17 mi)	
C434	Lang–Lang–Poowong Road	Nyora		Poowong	13 km (8 mi)	
C435	Billson Street; Cape Paterson Road; Cape Paterson–Inverloch Road	Wonthaggi	Cape Paterson	Inverloch	22 km (14 mi)	
C436	Corinella Road	Corinella			7 km (4 mi)	Road is entirely within Corinella
C437	Korumburra Road; Korumburra–Wonthaggi Road	Wonthaggi	Kongwak	Korumburra	32 km (20 mi)	
C438	Dalyston–Glen Forbes Road; Archies Creek Road; West Creek Road	Dalyston		West Creek	10 km (6 mi)	Decommissioned in 2003
C439	Phillip Island Road	Anderson			2 km (1 mi)	Unsigned, replaced along Phillip Island Road when Anderson bypass opened in 2013
C441	Bayview Ave; Powlett St; Inverloch–Kongwak Rd	Inverloch		Kongwak	14 km (9 mi)	
C442	Inverloch–Venus Bay Rd	Inverloch		Tarwin Lower	17 km (11 mi)	
C443	Tarwin Lower Rd; Inverloch–Venus Bay Rd	Tarwin		Tarwin Lower	23 km (14 mi)	
C444	Meeniyan–Promontory Rd; Wilsons Promontory Rd	Meeniyan	Fish Creek; Yanakie	Tidal River	72 km (45 mi)	
C445	Fish Creek–Foster Rd; Waratah Rd	Foster	Fish Creek	Sandy Point	32 km (20 mi)	
C446	Foster–Promontory Rd	Foster		Fish Creek	11 km (7 mi)	
C447	Barry Rd	Agnes			6 km (4 mi)	Road is entirely within Agnes.
C449	Won Wron Rd; Calrossie–Won Wron Rd	Devon North		Won Wron	10 km (6 mi)	Gravel road.
C451	Port Welshpool Rd	Welshpool		Port Welshpool	5 km (3 mi)	
C452	Yarram–Port Albert Rd	Alberton		Port Albert	10 km (6 mi)	
C453	Carrajung–Woodside Rd; Woodside Beach Rd	Carrajung	Woodside	Woodside Beach	33 km (21 mi)	
C454	Ogilvy St; Nerrena Rd	Leongatha		Dumbalk	18 km (11 mi)	
C455	Meeniyan–Mirboo North Rd	Meeniyan	Dumbalk	Mirboo North	27 km (17 mi)	
C456	Monash Way; Boolarra–Mirboo North Rd	Morwell	Churchill; Boolarra	Mirboo North	42 km (26 mi)	
C457	Boolarra South–Mirboo North Rd	Mirboo		Mirboo North	14 km (9 mi)	
C458	Foster Rd; Grand Ridge Rd	Boolarra		Mirboo	16 km (10 mi)	Partially unsealed.
C459	Cherry Tree Rd; McLoughlins Beach Rd	Woodside		McLoughlins Beach	10 km (6 mi)	
C461	Walhalla Rd	Rawson		Walhalla	11 km (7 mi)	
C462	Bloomfield Rd	Crossover		Nilma	16 km (10 mi)	
C463	Seven Mile Rd; Willow Grove Rd	Trafalgar		Willow Grove	18 km (11 mi)	
C464	Morwell–Thorpdale Rd	Morwell		Thorpdale	13 km (8 mi)	
C465	Willow Grove Rd; Moe–Willow Grove Rd	Noojee; Mt Baw Baw	Willow Grove; Hill End	Moe	39 km (24 mi)	
C466	Haigh St; Moore St; Moe–Walhalla Rd; Moe–Rawson Rd	Moe	Erica	Rawson	35 km (22 mi)	
C467	Old Sale Rd; Thompsons Rd; Sullivans Track	Moe	Lake Narracan; Moe North	Yallourn North	5 km (3 mi)	
C468	Brodribb Rd	Hazelwood North		Hazelwood	3 km (2 mi)	
C469	Mirboo North–Trafalgar Rd; Ashby St	Mirboo North	Thorpdale	Trafalgar	21 km (13 mi)	
C471	Haunted Hills Rd; De Campo Drive	Morwell		Yallourn North	4 km (2 mi)	
C472	Latrobe Rd	Morwell		Maryvale	8 km (5 mi)	
C473	Ventnor Rd	Cowes	Ventnor	Summerlands	13 km (8 mi)	
C474	Tanjil East Rd; Alexanders Rd; Tramway Rd	Yallourn North	Morwell	Hazelwood North	12 km (7 mi)	
C475	Commercial Rd; Morwell–Traralgon Rd; Firmins Lane; Sanders Rd; Mattingley Hill Rd	Morwell		Traralgon South	14 km (9 mi)	
C476	Hazelwood Rd; Boldings Rd; Tramway Rd	Traralgon		Churchill	17 km (11 mi)	
C477	Grey St; Traralgon West Rd	Traralgon		Maryvale	10 km (6 mi)	
C478	Back Beach Rd	Sunderland Bay		Ventnor	10 km (6 mi)	
C481	Tyers Road; Tyers–Walhalla Road; Thomson Valley Road; Thomson Dam Access Road	Traralgon	Tyers; Rawson	Thomson	55 km (34 mi)	
C482	Shakespeare Street; Traralgon Creek Road; Hyland Highway	Traralgon	Gormandale	Yarram	60 km (37 mi)	
C483	Traralgon Creek Road; Traralgon–Balook Road	Traralgon South		Balook	26 km (16 mi)	
C484	Grand Ridge Road; Tarra Valley Road	Willung South	Carrajung	Yarram	50 km (31 mi)	
C485	Rosedale–Longford Road; Longford–Loch Sport Road	Rosedale	Longford	Loch Sport	78 km (48 mi)	
C486	Licola Road; Jamieson–Licola Road	Heyfield	Glenmaggie; Licola	Jamieson	144 km (89 mi)	
C487	Maffra–Rosedale Road	Tinamba		Kilmany	14 km (9 mi)	
C488	Rosedale–Heyfield Road	Rosedale	Nambrok	Heyfield	14 km (9 mi)	
C491	Sale–Heyfield Road	Fulham		Nambrok	14 km (9 mi)	
C492	Maffra–Sale Road	Maffra	Bundalaguah	Sale	16 km (10 mi)	
C493	Maffra–Briagolong Road	Maffra	Boisdale	Briagolong	20 km (12 mi)	
C494	Briagolong Road	Stratford		Briagolong	14 km (9 mi)	
C495	Stratford–Bengworden Road	Stratford		Perry Bridge	9 km (6 mi)	
C496	Seaspray Road	Longford		Seaspray	27 km (17 mi)	
C497	Garretts Road	Longford		Dutson	7.9 km (5 mi)	
C498	Raglan Street; Aerodrome Road	Sale		RAAF Base East Sale	5 km (3 mi)	
Decommissioned or unsigned route

==== C505 to C695 ====
Route	Component roads	From	Via	To	Length	Notes
C505	Badger Creek Road; Don Road; Donna Buang Road	Healesville	Badger Creek; Mount Toolebewong	Warburton	40 km (25 mi)	Concurrency with along Don Road from Badger Creek to Mount Toolebewong
C506	Don Road	Healesville	Badger Creek; Mt. Toolebewong; Don Valley	Launching Place	20 km (12 mi)	Concurrency with along Don Road from Badger Creek to Mount Toolebewong
C507	Donna Buang Road; Acheron Way	Narbethong		Warburton	35 km (22 mi)	
C508	Buxton–Marysville Rd	Buxton		Marysville	11 km (7 mi)	
C511	Woods Point Road; Warburton–Woods Point Road; Mansfield–Woods Point Road	Warburton	Matlock; Woods Point; Kevington; Jamieson	Mansfield	190 km (118 mi)	Gravel road between Matlock and Kevington
C512	Marysville Road; Marysville–Woods Point Road; Lake Mountain Road	Narbethong	Marysville	Lake Mountain Alpine Resort	30 km (19 mi)	Lake Mountain Road is a gravel road
C513	Marysville–Woods Point Road	Cambarville			8 km (5 mi)	Road is entirely within locality of Cambarville
C515	Taggerty–Thornton Road	Taggerty		Thornton	13 km (8 mi)	
C516	Maroondah Highway	Yarck		Koriella	7 km (4 mi)	
C517	Benalla–Tatong Road; Tatong–Tolmie Road	Benalla	Tatong	Tolmie	62 km (39 mi)	
C518	Midland Highway	Barjarg		Mansfield	15 km (9 mi)	
C519	Mount Stirling Road	Mount Stirling		Mirimbah	9.5 km (6 mi)	Unsigned
C521	Wangaratta–Whitfield Road; Mansfield–Whitfield Road	Wangaratta	Oxley; Moyhu; Whitfield; Tolmie	Mansfield	111 km (69 mi)	
C522	Snow Road	Wangaratta South	Oxley	Myrtleford	54 km (34 mi)	
C523	Greta Road	Wangaratta		Laceby	9 km (6 mi)	
C524	Buckland Gap Road	Beechworth		Bowmans Forest	15 km (9 mi)	
C525	Stanley Road; Myrtleford-Stanley Road	Beechworth		Stanley	8 km (5 mi)	
C526	Buffalo River Rd	Myrtleford	Buffalo River	Dadongadale	32 km (20 mi)	
C527	Myrtleford–Yackandandah Road; Yackandandah–Wodonga Road	Myrtleford	Yackandandah	Baranduda	57 km (35 mi)	
C528	Dederang Road	Bruarong		Dederang	14 km (9 mi)	
C529	Melbourne Road	Wodonga			1 km (1 mi)	Unsigned, road is entirely within Wodonga
C531	Kiewa Valley Highway; Bogong High Plains Road	Bandiana	Dederang; Tawonga; Mount Beauty; Bogong High Plains	Falls Creek Alpine Resort	110 km (68 mi)	Concurrency with along Kiewa Valley Highway from Staghorn Flat to Kiewa
C532	Yackandandah Road	Wooragee		Yackandandah	5 km (3 mi)	
C533	Lindsay Road; Kiewa Valley Highway; Kiewa East Road	Staghorn Flat		Tangambalanga	17 km (11 mi)	Concurrency with along Kiewa Valley Highway from Staghorn Flat to Kiewa
C534	Happy Valley Road; Running Creek Road	Ovens		Running Creek	34 km (21 mi)	
C535	Mount Buffalo Road	Porepunkah		Mount Buffalo National Park	37 km (23 mi)	
C536	Tawonga Gap Road	Bright	Tawonga	Mount Beauty	25 km (16 mi)	
C537	Lockharts Gap Road	Tangambalanga		Tallandoon	24 km (15 mi)	
C538	Melrose Drive; Yarralumla Drive	Wodonga		Wodonga South	6 km (4 mi)	
C541	Bonegilla Road	Ebden	Bonegilla	VIC/NSW border	5.8 km (4 mi)	
C542	Murray River Road	Bellbridge		Granya	32 km (20 mi)	
C543	Omeo Highway	Tallangatta	Eskdale; Mitta Mitta	Omeo	162 km (101 mi)	
C544	Dartmouth Road	Mitta Mitta		Dartmouth	22 km (14 mi)	
C545	Benambra Road; Benambra–Corryong Road	Colac Colac	Benambra	Omeo	132 km (82 mi)	
C546	Granya Road; Murray River Road	Old Tallangatta	Granya; Walwa; Tintaldra	Towong	116 km (72 mi)	
C547	Shelley Road	Walwa		Shelley	33 km (21 mi)	
C548	Cudgewa Valley Road	Tintaldra		Cudgewa	27 km (17 mi)	
C601	Dargo Road	Bairnsdale	Lindenow	Dargo	85 km (53 mi)	
C602	Lindenow–Glenaladale Road	Lindenow		Lindenow South	9 km (6 mi)	
C603	Bullumwaal Road	Bairnsdale	Mount Taylor	Bullumwaal	16 km (10 mi)	
C604	Paynesville Road	Bairnsdale	Eagle Point	Paynesville	16 km (10 mi)	
C605	Swan Reach Road	Wiseleigh		Swan Reach	13 km (8 mi)	
C606	Metung Road	Swan Reach		Metung	10 km (6 mi)	
C607	Timbarra Road	Timbarra		Buchan	42 km (26 mi)	
C608	Snowy River Road; Gelantipy Road; Bruthen–Buchan Road	VIC/NSW border	Buchan	Nowa Nowa	124 km (77 mi)	
C611	McKillops Road	Wulgulmerang East	Deddick Valley; Tubbut	Bonang	80.6 km (50 mi)	
C612	Bonang Road	VIC/NSW border	Goongerah	Orbost	113 km (70 mi)	
C614	Murrungowar Road	Murrungowar			20 km (12 mi)	Unsigned, road is entirely within Murrungowar
C615	Sydenham Inlet Road	Bellbird Creek		Bemm River	21.5 km (13 mi)	Decommissioned in 2011
C616	Combienbar Road	Combienbar		Club Terrace	32.2 km (20 mi)	Gravel road
C617	Genoa–Mallacoota Road	Genoa	Gipsy Point	Mallacoota	22.6 km (14 mi)	
C618	Gipsy Point Road	Genoa		Gipsy Point	2.3 km (1 mi)	Decommissioned in 2011
C620	Bruthen–Nowa Nowa Road	Bruthen		Nowa Nowa	28.8 km (18 mi)	
C652	Pound Road West; Remington Drive	Dandenong South			1.8 km (1 mi)	– Allocated in 2023 – Road is entirely within Dandenong South
C655	Jacksons Road	Wheelers Hill		Noble Park North	1.6 km (1 mi)	Allocated in 2020
C695	McGregor Road; Soldiers Road; Hobson Road	Pakenham		Rythdale	9.5 km (6 mi)	Allocated in 2024
Decommissioned or unsigned route

==== C701 to C794 ====
Route	Component roads	From	Via	To	Length	Notes
C701	McGrath Road; Heaths Road; Old Geelong Road	Wyndham Vale	Werribee	Hoppers Crossing	10.6 km (7 mi)	Southern end along Forsyth Road originally terminating at Point Cook truncated to current alignment in 2020 (replaced by)
C702	Derrimut Road; Hopkins Road	Werribee	Hoppers Crossing; Tarneit	Rockbank	16 km (10 mi)	
C703	Cottrell Street; Ballan Road	Werribee	Wyndham Vale; Quandong	Balliang East	24 km (15 mi)	
C704	Bacchus Marsh Road, Geelong; Bacchus Marsh–Geelong Road; Geelong–Bacchus Marsh Road; Gisborne Road; Robertson Street	Corio	Balliang; Balliang East; Parwan; Bacchus Marsh; Coimadai; Bullengarook	Gisborne	81 km (50 mi)	
C705	Melton Road; Gisborne–Melton Road	Gisborne	Toolern Vale; Kurunjang	Melton	24 km (15 mi)	
C706	Horne Street; Vineyard Road; Diggers Rest–Coimadai Road	Sunbury	Diggers Rest; Toolern Vale	Coimadai	40 km (25 mi)	
C707	Gap Road	Sunbury			4 km (2 mi)	Road is entirely within Sunbury
C708	Station Road; Saunders Road; Kilmore Road (I); Main Road; Kilmore Road (II)	Gisborne	New Gisborne; Riddells Creek	Monegeetta	17 km (11 mi)	
C722	Sydney Road; Craigieburn Road East	Craigieburn		Wollert	9.1 km (6 mi)	– Western end along Craigieburn Road West truncated to current alignment in 2024 after Craigieburn Road Upgrade, replaced by – Concurrency with along Sydney Road through Craigieburn
C723	Donnybrook Road	Mickleham	Donnybrook; Woodstock	Yan Yean	20 km (12 mi)	
C724	Healesville–Kinglake Road; Whittlesea–Kinglake Road	Healesville	Chum Creek; Toolangi; Castella; Kinglake; Pheasant Creek	Kinglake West	44 km (27 mi)	
C725	Macmeikan Street; Beech Street; Whittlesea–Yea Road; North Street	Whittlesea	Humevale; Kinglake West; Hazeldene; Flowerdale	Yea	56 km (35 mi)	
C726	Healesville–Yarra Glen Road; Melba Highway; Bell Street; Symonds Street; Eltham–Yarra Glen Road	Healesville	Tarrawarra; Yarra Glen; Christmas Hills; Watsons Creek	Kangaroo Ground	30 km (19 mi)	Concurrency with along Healesville-Yarra Glen Road through Yarra Glen
C727	Plenty Road; Wallan Road; Wallan–Whittlesea Road; Epping–Kilmore Road; Wallan–Whittlesea Road; Watson Street	Mernda	Yan Yean; Whittlesea; Upper Plenty	Wallan	30 km (19 mi)	– Southern end along Plenty Road originally terminating at South Morang truncated to current alignment in 2021 (replaced by) – Continues south as along Plenty Road to Bundoora
C728	Kangaroo Ground–St Andrews Road; Burns Street	Kangaroo Ground	Panton Hill; Smiths Gully	St Andrews	11 km (7 mi)	
C729	Epping Road; Merriang Road; Epping–Kilmore Road; Wandong Road	Wollert	Woodstock; Beveridge; Heathcote Junction; Wandong	Kilmore	37 km (23 mi)	– Southern end along Epping Road originally terminating at Epping truncated to current alignment in 2026 (replaced by A57) – Continues south as A57 along Epping Road to Epping
C731	Melba Highway	Yarra Glen			2 km (1 mi)	– Loop route, allocated when Yarra Glen Bypass opened in 2010 – Road is entirely within Yarra Glen
C739	Mickleham Road	Greenvale	Yuroke	Mickleham	11 km (7 mi)	Continues south into Melbourne as Mickleham Road
C743	Sunbury Road (I); Bulla Road; Sunbury Road (II); Macedon Street; Riddell Road	Tullamarine Airport	Bulla; Sunbury	Riddells Creek	30 km (19 mi)	Continues south into Melbourne as Tullamarine Freeway
C746	Caledonia Street; Heidelberg–Kinglake Road; Main Hurstbridge Road	Wattle Glen	Hurstbridge; Cottles Bridge; St Andrews	Kinglake	25 km (16 mi)	Continues south into Melbourne as Main Hurstbridge Road
C754	Melton Highway	Keilor	Taylors Lakes; Hillside	Melton South	19 km (12 mi)	To be replaced by A82
C776	Elizabeth Avenue; Eastbourne Road	Capel Sound		Rosebud	2 km (1 mi)	Unsigned
C777	McMahons Road; Frankston–Flinders Road; Cook Street; Boneo Road	Frankston	Baxter; Somerville; Tyabb; Hastings; Balnarring; Merricks; Shoreham; Flinders; Boneo	Rosebud	69 km (43 mi)	– Northern end extended along Frankston-Flinders and McMahons Roads from Frankston South to Frankston when Peninsula Link opened in 2013: Continues north into Melbourne as Frankston Freeway
C778	Clyde–Five Ways Road	Clyde		Five Ways	4 km (2 mi)	Unsigned
C781	Sages Road; Baxter–Tooradin Road	Frankston South	Baxter; Langwarrin South; Pearcedale	Tooradin	20 km (12 mi)	
C782	Main Street, Mornington; Tyabb Road; Mornington–Tyabb Road	Mornington	Moorooduc	Tyabb	15 km (9 mi)	
C783	Esplanade; Marine Drive	Mornington	Mount Martha; Safety Beach	Dromana	16 km (10 mi)	
C784	Moorooduc Highway; Old Moorooduc Road; Balnarring Road	Frankston South	Moorooduc; Tuerong	Balnarring	25 km (16 mi)	Northern end extended along Moorooduc Highway from Tuerong to Frankston South when Peninsula Link opened in 2013
C785	Coolart Road	Baxter	Hastings	Balnarring	18 km (11 mi)	
C786	Stony Point Road	Bittern		Crib Point	6 km (4 mi)	
C787	Nepean Highway; White Hill Road; Arthurs Seat Road; Mornington–Flinders Road	Tuerong	Dromana; Red Hill; Main Ridge	Flinders	23 km (14 mi)	
C788	Dunns Creek Road; Bittern–Dromana Road	Dromana	Red Hill; Merricks North; Balnarring	Bittern	15 km (9 mi)	
C789	McCulloch Street; Arthurs Seat Road	Dromana	Arthurs Seat	Red Hill	9 km (6 mi)	
C791	Station Road; Melbourne Road	Gisborne			4 km (2 mi)	Loop route Road is entirely within Gisborne
C792	Avenue of Honour; High Street, Woodend; Black Forest Drive; Macedon–Woodend Road	Woodend North	Woodend; Macedon	New Gisborne	18 km (11 mi)	Loop route Former Calder Highway alignment
C793	Bourke Street, Kyneton; High Street, Kyneton; Mollison Street, Kyneton; Piper Street; Burton Avenue	Kyneton			8 km (5 mi)	Loop route Road is entirely within Kyneton
C794	Calder Highway (I); High Street, Taradale; Calder Highway (II); Mollison Street, Malmsbury; Malmsbury East Road	Elphinstone	Taradale	Malmsbury	15.3 km (10 mi)	Loop route Former Calder Highway alignment
Decommissioned or unsigned route

==== C801 to C996 ====
Route	Component roads	From	Via	To	Length	Notes
C801	Coburns Road; High Street, Melton	Melton		Brookfield	5 km (3 mi)	Loop route Former Western Highway alignment
C802	Bacchus Marsh Road, Bacchus Marsh; Main Street	Merrimu		Bacchus Marsh	7 km (4 mi)	Loop route Former Western Highway alignment
C803	Inglis Street; Old Melbourne Road	Ballan			5 km (3 mi)	Loop route Road is entirely within Ballan
C804	Bungaree–Wallace Road	Bungaree	Wallace	Leigh Creek	8.2 km (5 mi)	Loop route Former Western Highway alignment, unsigned, co-signed as
C805	Ballarat–Burrumbeet Road; Victoria Street, Ballarat; Mair Street (East); Dawson Street North; Sturt Street; Remembrance Drive	Warrenheip	Ballarat East; Ballarat; Newington; Alfredton; Cardigan	Burrumbeet	26 km (16 mi)	Loop route Former Western Highway alignment
C844	Little Boundary Road	Laverton North			1 km (1 mi)	Allocated in 2024, road is entirely within Laverton North
C953	Bolton Street	Eltham			1.6 km (1 mi)	Allocated in 2022, road is entirely within Eltham
C989	Wells Road	Chelsea Heights			1.9 km (1 mi)	– Allocated in 2020, road is entirely within Chelsea Heights – Continues north as along Wells Road eventually to Doncaster
C996	Thames Promenade	Chelsea Heights		Chelsea	0.2 km (0 mi)	Allocated in 2020
Decommissioned or unsigned route

== See also ==
- List of road routes in the Australian Capital Territory
- List of road routes in New South Wales
- List of road routes in the Northern Territory
- List of road routes in Queensland
- List of road routes in South Australia
- List of road routes in Tasmania
- List of road routes in Western Australia
- List of highways in Victoria
- Road transport in Victoria
