= Monash Freeway =

Freeway in Victoria, Australia

Monash Freeway Victoria
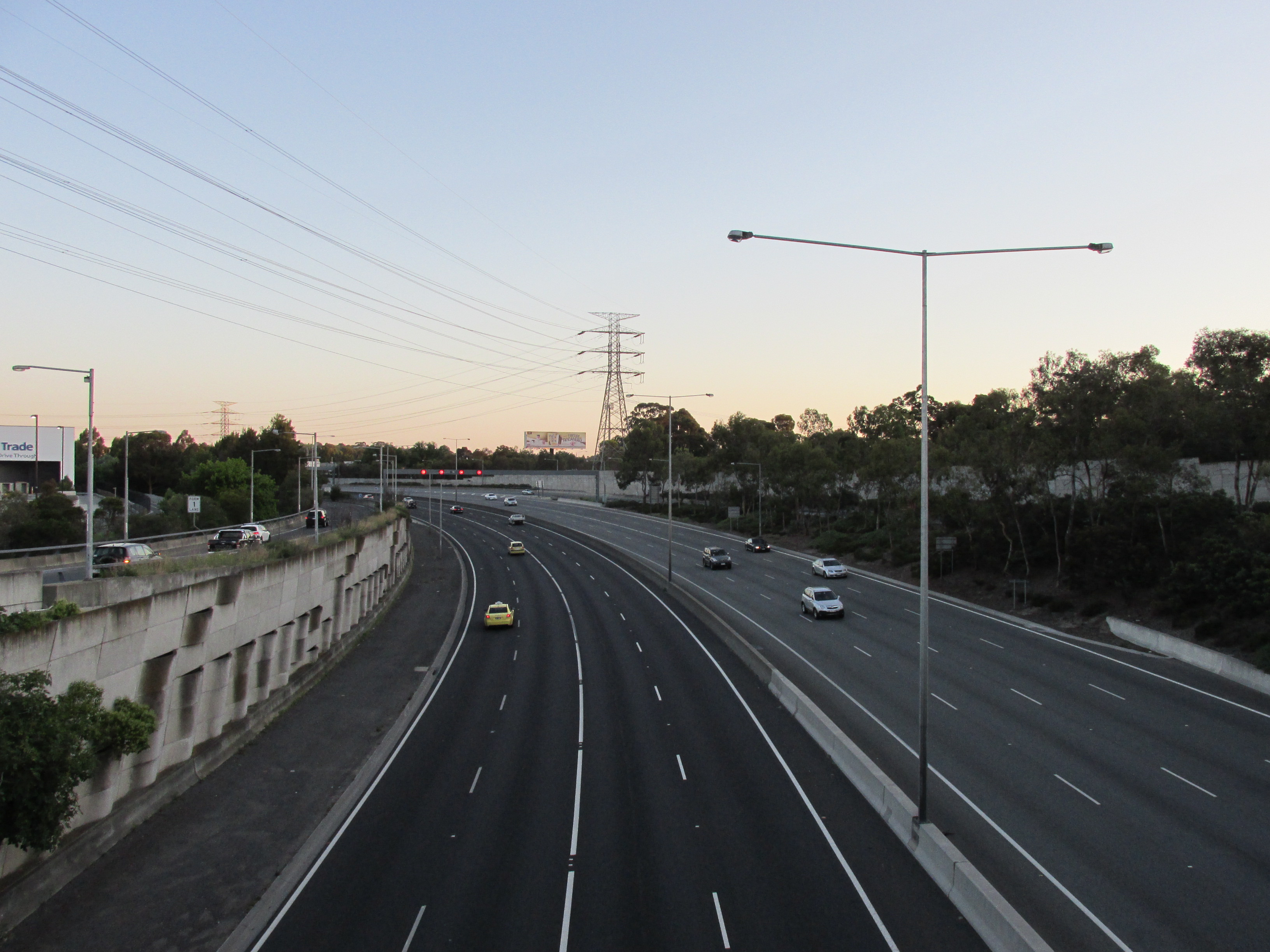
- Monash Freeway viewed from the Toorak Road overpass
- Coordinates: 37.844728°S 145.039619°E (Northwest end); 38.028088°S 145.320862°E (Southeast end)

General information
- Type: Freeway
- Length: 34 km (21 mi)
- Opened: 1962–2003
- Route number(s): M1 (1996–present)
- Former route number: Metro Route 80 (1965–1971) (Cremorne–Burnley); Freeway Route 80 (1971–1988) (Cremorne–Kooyong); Freeway Route 81 (1972–1988) (Chadstone–Eumemmering); National Route 1 (1988–1996) (Kooyong–Doveton)

Major junctions
- Northwest end: CityLink; Kooyong, Melbourne
- Toorak Road; Burke Road; Warrigal Road; Blackburn Road; Ferntree Gully Road; Springvale Road; Wellington Road; EastLink; Stud Road; Heatherton Road; South Gippsland Freeway; Belgrave–Hallam Road; Princes Highway
- Southeast end: Princes Freeway; Narre Warren, Melbourne

Location(s)
- LGA(s): City of Stonnington; City of Monash; City of Greater Dandenong; City of Casey
- Major suburbs / towns: Kooyong, Glen Iris, Chadstone, Mulgrave, Dandenong North, Doveton, Narre Warren

Highway system
- Highways in Australia; National Highway • Freeways in Australia; Highways in Victoria

The Monash Freeway is a major urban freeway in Victoria, Australia, linking Melbourne's CBD to its south-eastern suburbs and beyond to the Gippsland region. It carries up to 470,000 vehicles per day and is one of Australia's busiest freeways. The entire stretch of the Monash Freeway bears the designation M1.

The freeway is named in honour of General Sir John Monash, an esteemed Australian military commander for the Allies during World War I.

== History ==
The Monash Freeway is an amalgamation of two initially separate freeways: the Mulgrave Freeway (initially designated Freeway Route 81) linking Warrigal Road, Chadstone, to the Princes Highway in Eumemmerring; and the South Eastern Freeway (initially designated Metropolitan Route 80, then Freeway Route 80) linking Punt Road, Richmond, and Toorak Road, Hawthorn East.

=== Mulgrave Freeway ===
Plans for a "Mulgrave By-pass Road and Eumemmerring By-pass Road" had been made as far back as 1966, between Warrigal Road in Chadstone and Princes Highway at Eumemmerring. The Country Roads Board started construction in the 1969/70 financial year, with the initial section of road opened to traffic in late 1972 with two names: as Mulgrave Freeway (from Stud Road in Dandenong North to Doveton), and Eumemmerring Freeway (from Doveton to Princes Highway at Eumemmerring); Eumemmerring Freeway was later separated and renamed South Gippsland Freeway in April 1974, and extended further south to Hampton Park in 1976. Through the 1970s and the early 1980s, the Mulgrave Freeway was progressively extended westward to Springvale Road in 1974, Blackburn Road in 1976, Forster Road in 1977, Huntingdale Road in 1979, and finally to Warrigal Road in Chadstone. The Freeway Route 81 designation was removed in 1988, coinciding with the opening of the South Eastern Arterial and its replacement by National Route 1.

At this time the Tullamarine Freeway also carried the Freeway Route 81 shield. This was due to the 1969 Melbourne Transportation Plan having the two freeways linked to each other from around East Malvern (at the Mulgrave Freeway end) and at Flemington (at the Tullamarine Freeway end), sweeping through the St Kilda area. The plan never came to fruition, but the two freeways have since been linked by the West Gate Freeway extension and the CityLink project.

==== Mulgrave Freeway timeline of construction ====
- 1972: Mulgrave and Eumemmerring Freeways, total 3.5 miles (5.6 km) from Princes Highway, Eumemmerring to Stud Road, Dandenong North, opened by the Governor of Victoria Sir Rohan Delacombe, 21 November 1972, total cost A$6.8mil.
- 1974: Mulgrave Freeway, extended 4.7 miles (7.6 km) from Stud Road to Springvale Road, Mulgrave, opened 10 April 1974, costing A$9.3mil.
- 1976: Extended 2 km (1.2 mi) from Springvale Road to Blackburn Road, Glen Waverley, opened 15 December 1976.
- 1977: Extended 1.6 km (0.99 mi) from Blackburn Road to Forster Road, Mount Waverley, opened 5 April 1977 by Minister for Transport, the Hon J A Rafferty (this section, along with the previous section opened in 1976, cost a total of A$13m).
- 1979: Extended 2.1 km (1.3 mi) from Forster Road to Huntingdale Road, Oakleigh, with three lanes each direction plus emergency stopping lanes, opened by Minister for Transport, the Hon Rob Maclellan MLA, 12 December 1979, at a cost of $8.7 million.
- 1981: Extended 1.6 km (0.99 mi) from Huntingdale Road to Warrigal Road, Malvern, with two lanes each direction plus emergency stopping lanes, opened by Minister for Transport, the Hon Rob Maclellan MLA, 24 June 1981, at a cost of $11 million. ‘Opened one week after the 20th anniversary of the opening of Victoria's first freeway, the Maltby Bypass Road near Werribee, on 16 June 1961'.

=== South Eastern Freeway ===
Construction of the initial section of the South Eastern Freeway by the Melbourne & Metropolitan Board of Works had been completed and opened in 1962, connecting Burnley at Burnley Street, through Cremorne via Harcourt Parade, over Punt Road using a new overpass (known as the Morshead Overpass during construction) to end at Anderson Street and the Morell Bridge, with an at-grade intersection with Brunton Avenue and a single-carriageway feeder road to the Swan Street bridge (and Batman Avenue) 800 metres beyond. The freeway was eventually further extended east from Burnley under the MacRobertson Bridge along the Yarra River to Toorak Road in 1970, with a single-carriageway feeder road taking excess traffic to Tooronga Road. The Punt Road overpass and elevated section of road over the Yarra River and Gardiners Creek were designed by Melbourne engineer Bruce Day. Responsibility for the freeway was transferred from the MMBW to the Country Roads Board on 1 July 1974.

Initially designated Metropolitan Route 80 in 1965, it was later signed as Freeway Route 80 in 1970 when the extension to Kooyong opened.

==== South Eastern Freeway timeline of construction ====
- 1962: Opened 1.8 miles (2.9 km) from the Swan Street bridge to Burnley, 31 May 1962
- 1970: Extended 2.5 miles (4.0 km) from Burnley to Toorak Road, Kooyong, 22 May 1970, by Minister for Local Government Rupert Hamer

=== South Eastern Arterial road link ===
The resulting gap between the Toorak Road end of the South Eastern Freeway and the Warrigal Road end of the Mulgrave Freeway frustrated drivers for many years; motorists had to rely on inadequate feeder roads to connect between the two freeways. Plans to link the two freeways dated from August 1978, while still extending the Mulgrave Freeway, from a Steering Committee appointed by the government in 1976 to carry out the "Gardiners Creek Valley Study": the study involved the Ministries for Planning, of Transport and for Conservation, the Melbourne and Metropolitan Board of Works, Town and Country Planning Board, Malvern, Camberwell and Hawthorn City Councils and the Country Roads Board, with an extensive process of public consultation. The subsequent route agreed to was referred to as the "South Eastern Freeway, Malvern Section" and was ultimately the alignment constructed.

Construction of the link as a dual-carriageway road began in 1985, opening to traffic in late 1988, originally with two lanes in each direction, and declared a State Highway. The link road, as well as the South Eastern and Mulgrave Freeways, were all renamed the South Eastern Arterial. This road assumed the National Route 1 route number from the Princes Highway, which became an alternative route. The project attracted a great deal of controversy just before it opened and well afterwards: in order to save costs, only one freeway-style interchange had been constructed (underneath High Street in Glen Iris). Every other interchange with major roads along the route (Toorak, Burke, Tooronga and Warrigal Roads) was an at-grade intersection controlled by traffic-lights, and because the road was constructed through residential areas, reduced speed limits were also enforced. This led to heavy congestion, frequently kilometres long, on the freeway, fuelling anger and frustration, and attracting a moniker of "the South-Eastern Carpark".

With a change of government some years later and a lot of political showmanship, more money was poured into the road: ramps connecting Police Road (to complement the existing ramps at Jacksons Road) opened in 1993, to improve traffic flow to Waverley Gardens and Waverley Park; and on the link road, construction of an overpass across Warrigal Road in 1994, and underpass interchanges at Toorak and Burke Roads (and just an underpass at Tooronga Road) soon afterwards. The name changed from South Eastern Arterial back to South Eastern Freeway for the full length of the freeway after upgrade works (including noise reduction measures, new landscaping and improvements to the adjacent cycle path) were completed in early 1997. The improved road dramatically improved the rate of outbound traffic; however, the bottleneck at the Swan Street Bridge still remained and the queues only got longer.

The previous Freeway Route designations (Freeway Route 80 along the South Eastern Freeway, and Freeway Route 81 along the Mulgrave Freeway) were removed in 1988 with the opening of the South Eastern Arterial, and replaced by National Route 1.

==== South Eastern Arterial timeline of construction ====
- 1988: South Eastern Arterial, 6.7 km (4.2 mi) from Toorak Road to Warrigal Road, opened 21 December 1988, at a cost of $152 million
- 1993: Police Road ramps, opened June 1993, at a cost of $2.2 million
- 1994: Warrigal Road overpass, opened June 1994, at a cost of $15 million
- 1996: Tooronga Road overpass, opened January 1996
- 1997: Conversion to freeway completed, and renamed South Eastern Freeway, official "opening" on 20 March 1997, at a total cost of $112m

=== Monash Freeway ===
The name changed yet again two years later to the current Monash Freeway in 1999, so named by Premier Jeff Kennett after General Sir John Monash, a renowned Australian soldier, engineer, scholar and nation builder. In the late 1990s, construction of CityLink's Southern Link project began, with the aim of linking the north-western end of the freeway (then terminating at Batman Avenue) to the eastern-end of the West Gate Freeway by way of tunnels underneath the city, allowing for an uninterrupted voyage past the CBD. A portion of the existing Monash Freeway at the city end (from Toorak to Punt Roads) was subsumed into the Southern Link, and while this portion was widened and upgraded, as part of the CityLink project it was also tolled, attracting criticism from road users. The Southern Link fully opened and tolling commenced on 28 December 2000.

With Victoria's conversion to the newer alphanumeric system in the late 1990s, the freeway's former National Route 1 designation began conversion to the M1 in late 1996, and was completed in 1997.

==== Hallam Bypass ====
Before this bypass was constructed, the sweeping curve of the freeway at the Hallam end that became the South Gippsland Freeway had its capacity reduced from three lanes to two, resulting in a notorious bottle-neck at peak hours, especially for outbound traffic exiting at the Princes Highway interchange outside Dandenong; the extension finally bypassed the entire problem.

Construction on the 7.5 km-long (4.7 mi) Hallam Bypass, linking the Monash Freeway to the Princes Freeway in Berwick, began in the 1999/2000 financial year, and was completed after 3 years of construction to open in July 2003, 17 months ahead of schedule and $10 million under budget for a total cost $165 million. This was due to the omission of one key interchange that should have linked the South Gippsland Freeway with the Hallam Bypass at Eummemmering. This omission causes unnecessary congestion on neighbouring roads as northbound South Gippsland Freeway traffic must exit the freeway at Princes Highway only to join the same freeway again from Belgrave-Hallam Road eastbound.

The Monash Freeway allows travel from Morwell in the central Latrobe Valley, to Colac south-west of Geelong – via CityLink, the West Gate, the Geelong Ring Road and Princes Freeways. Motorists can cover over 260 km (160 mi) and only encounter traffic lights at Yarragon and Trafalgar, which are yet to be bypassed. The construction of the bypass also included the Hallam Bypass Trail shared path.

=== Road classification ===
The passing of the Road Management Act 2004 granted the responsibility of overall management and development of Victoria's major arterial roads to VicRoads: in 2004, VicRoads re-declared Monash Freeway (Freeway #1000) from the "Southern Link Tollway" (CityLink's Southern Link) at Kooyong to Princes Highway in Narre Warren.

The freeway was originally shown in the 1969 Melbourne Transportation Plan as part of the F9 and F14 Freeway corridors.

=== Upgrades ===
==== 2007–2010 ====
In 2007, the state government announced a major upgrade widening the lanes from Glenferrie Road through to Heatherton Road. Prior to this, over 160,000 vehicles per day used this freeway resulting in congestion during peak hours. The upgrade started in late 2007 and was completed in 2010. The entire project was known as the Monash-CityLink-West Gate upgrade, and was carried out by VicRoads and Transurban.

==== 2016–2022 ====
The Monash Freeway (and parts of the Princes Freeway continuing eastward) underwent an upgrade to accommodate an extra lane in each direction between Warrigal Road in Chadstone and Cardinia Road in Officer. Stage 1, completed between 2016 and 2018, added extra lanes between EastLink and Clyde Road in Berwick.

Stage 2, completed between 2020 and 2022, added 36km (22.4mi) of extra lanes in the remaining segments, re-connected Police Road with its own outbound ramp and added dedicated ramps to Eastlink from Jacksons Road, upgraded the Beaconsfield interchange to a diamond interchange, upgraded the entire section to use VicRoads' traffic management system, and built a shared walking and cycling path along O'Shea Road. All in all, costing the government A$1,080,000,000.

== Route and conditions ==
The freeway officially begins at the southern end of CityLink, at Toorak Road. Here the freeway is five lanes wide. The opposing carriageways of the freeway are relatively near to each other and are separated by a concrete barrier. This section has overhead lighting. This first section of freeway runs through the south-eastern suburbs of Malvern, Glen Iris and Malvern East.

After Warrigal Road, the freeway is built within a much wider road reserve, allowing for a wide grass centre median with steel barrier separating the carriageways. This section does not have overhead lighting and carries four or five lanes on each carriageway. This section runs through south-eastern metropolitan Melbourne, including the suburbs of Chadstone, Mount Waverley, Mulgrave, and Dandenong to Doveton. Finally, the newest portion of the freeway, the Hallam bypass, carries three lanes each way and runs past Hallam to Narre Warren, where it becomes the Princes Freeway.

The M1 route also carries the VicRoads Traffic Management System which included Freeway On-Ramp metering (with road loops and signals), over-head speed limit and lane signs and electronic message boards; there are also various CCTV cameras and traffic sensors to monitor traffic flow and conditions constantly. Electronic 'Estimated Travel Time' boards are also used in conjunction with the sensors.

The usual peak period travel time with traffic congestion is between 45 and 70 minutes. Some of the slowest intersections at these times include the EastLink and South Gippsland Freeway interchanges. In times of extreme congestion or traffic accidents, the travel time can quickly increase to as high as 110 minutes.

== Exits and interchanges ==
LGA	Location	km	mi	Exit	Destinations	Notes
Stonnington	Kooyong–Malvern boundary	0.0	0.0	E4	CityLink (M1 northwest) – City, Melbourne Airport	North-western freeway terminus: continues northwest as CityLink's Southern Link
Stonnington	Kooyong–Malvern boundary	0.0	0.0	E4	Toorak Road (Metro Route 26) – Toorak, Burwood	Single-point urban interchange
Stonnington	Glen Iris	1.5	0.93	E5	Burke Road (Metro Route 17) – Caulfield, Camberwell	
Stonnington	Glen Iris	2.6	1.6	E6	High Street (Metro Route 24) – Glen Waverley, Glen Iris	Northwestern entrance and southeastern exit only
Stonnington–Monash boundary	Malvern East–Chadstone boundary	6.7	4.2	E7	Warrigal Road (Metro Route 15) – Oakleigh, Chadstone	
Monash	Chadstone–Mount Waverley boundary	8.4	5.2	8	Huntingdale Road (Metro Route 47) – Huntingdale, Burwood	Southeastern entrance and northwestern exit only
Monash	Mount Waverley	10.5	6.5	9	Forster Road – Clayton, Mount Waverley	
Monash	Mount Waverley–Glen Waverley boundary	11.7	7.3	10	Blackburn Road (Metro Route 13) – Clayton, Blackburn, Monash University	Southeastern entrance via England Road
Monash	Mulgrave	12.9	8.0	11	Ferntree Gully Road (Metro Route 22) – Ferntree Gully, Mount Dandenong	Northwestern entrance and southeastern exit only
Monash	Mulgrave–Wheelers Hill boundary	13.8	8.6	12	Springvale Road (Metro Route 40) – Springvale, Glen Waverley	Southeastern entrance and northwestern exit only
Monash	Mulgrave–Wheelers Hill boundary	15.6	9.7	13	Wellington Road (Metro Route 18) – Rowville, Oakleigh, Monash University	Northwestern exit and northwestern entrance westbound only, southeastern exit and southeastern entrance eastbound only
Monash	Mulgrave	18.0	11.2	14	Jacksons Road (C655) – Mulgrave, Noble Park	No northwestern exit, southeastern entrance to EastLink only
Monash–Greater Dandenong boundary	Mulgrave–Dandenong North boundary	18.3	11.4	15	Police Road (Metro Route 16) – Springvale, Dandenong North	Southeastern entrance and northwestern exit only
Greater Dandenong	Dandenong North	19.5	12.1	16	EastLink (M3) – Ringwood, Frankston	Tom Wills Interchange; partial turbine interchange: no southeastern entrance northbound or northwestern exit southbound
Greater Dandenong	Dandenong North	21.9	13.6	17	Stud Road (Metro Route 9) – Rowville, Dandenong	
Casey	Doveton–Endeavour Hills boundary	23.7	14.7	18	Heatherton Road (Metro Route 14) – Noble Park, Endeavour Hills	
Casey	Doveton–Endeavour Hills boundary	26.3	16.3	19	South Gippsland Freeway (M780) – Cranbourne, Hastings	Partial semi-directional T interchange: no southeastern entrance
Casey	Hallam–Narre Warren North boundary	28.2	17.5	20	Belgrave–Hallam Road (B675) – Hallam, Endeavour Hills	
Casey	Narre Warren	29.9	18.6	21	Ernst Wanke Road – Narre Warren	Northwestern entrance and southeastern exit only
Casey	Narre Warren	32.2	20.0	22	Narre Warren North Road (C404) – Belgrave, Narre Warren	
Casey	Narre Warren–Berwick boundary	33.8	21.0	23	Princes Highway (Alt National Route 1 west/C101 east) – Berwick, Dandenong	
Casey	Narre Warren–Berwick boundary	33.8	21.0	23	Princes Freeway (M1 southeast) – Pakenham, Warragul, Traralgon	South-eastern freeway terminus: continues as Princes Freeway
1.000 mi = 1.609 km; 1.000 km = 0.621 mi: Incomplete access; Route transition
