= Hallam Road =

Road in Melbourne, Australia

Hallam Road Hallam North Road Belgrave–Hallam Road Hallam South Road Victoria

General information
- Type: Road
- Length: 9.1 km (5.7 mi)
- Route number(s): B675 (2020–present)

Major junctions
- North end: Hallam North Road; Endeavour Hills, Melbourne
- Monash Freeway; Princes Highway; South Gippsland Highway
- South end: Evans Road; Lynbrook, Melbourne

Location(s)
- LGA(s): City of Casey
- Major suburbs: Hallam, Hampton Park

Hallam Road is a major urban arterial road in the south-eastern suburbs of Melbourne, Victoria, Australia. Within Hampton Park the road is known as Hallam Road, whilst on its northern sections the allocation is still best known as by the names of its constituent parts: Hallam North Road, Belgrave–Hallam Road, and Hallam South Road. This article will deal with the entire length of the corridor for sake of completion, as well to avoid confusion between declarations.

According to estimates from the Government of Victoria, Hallam Road – in combination with the South Gippsland Highway and Evans Road – is used by tens of thousands of people every day.

== Route ==
Hallam North Road begins at the intersection with Heatherton Road in Narre Warren North, travelling southbound towards Lynbrook. After a short distance, the road intersects with Belgrave-Hallam Road to the east, with Hallam Road assuming this name travelling southbound. South of the Princes Highway intersection in Hallam, the road changes name to Hallam South Road, continuing southbound. The road once more changes name crossing the Hallam Main Drain in Hampton Park, known simply as Hallam Road, continuing southbound until the road terminates at the intersection with South Gippsland Highway in Lynbrook.

== History ==
Hallam Road derives its name from the same person as the suburb of Hallam, Victoria. In the 1850s, William Hallam established a pub on the corner of Gippsland Road and the cross-street came to be known as "Hallam's Road". When a train station was established on the line from Gippsland to Melbourne it took the same name. There had been a school in different nearby locations since 1858 but it was moved to Hallam Road in 1904, and in 1923 it became known simply as 'Hallam' (distinct from the modern Hallam Primary School nearby).

Hallam Road had previously been given no route designation. With Victoria's conversion to the newer alphanumeric system, the section between Heatherton Road and South Gippsland Highway has been assigned B675 in 2020.

== Major works ==
A package of capital works on Hallam Road between Ormond Road and the South Gippsland Highway were completed in 2020, following calls for improvements to the road's condition in 2013. That work was the first phase in a series of work, culminating in the removal of a level crossing on Hallam Road associated with Hallam railway station, as part of the broader Level Crossing Removal Project. The $284 million project was prompted by 14 near-misses on Hallam Road involving vehicles and pedestrians in the 10 years preceding 2021.

== Features ==
- Hampton Park Landfill, one of Victoria's largest landfills, which accepts waste from several Melbourne councils.
- Hallam railway station, which serves 2000+ commuters each day.
- St Kevin's Primary School, which was first established in 1988 on Somerville Road and relocated in 1990.

== Major intersections ==
Hallam Road is entirely contained within the City of Casey local government area.

Location	km	mi	Destinations	Notes
Endeavour Hills–Narre Warren North boundary	0	0.0	Hallam North Road – Endeavour Hills	Northern terminus of road and route B675
Endeavour Hills–Narre Warren North boundary	0	0.0	Heatherton Road (Metro Route 14) – Noble Park, Narre Warren North	
Hallam–Narre Warren North boundary	2.2	1.4	Monash Freeway (M1) – Warragul, City	
Hallam	3.2	2.0	Princes Highway (Alternative National Route 1) – Dandenong, Berwick	
Hampton Park	5.7	3.5	Pound Road (Metro Route 12) – Narre Warren, Dandenong South	
Hampton Park–Lynbrook boundary	9.1	5.7	South Gippsland Highway (A21) – Dandenong, Cranbourne	
Hampton Park–Lynbrook boundary	9.1	5.7	Evans Road (B675) – Cranbourne West	Southern terminus of road, route B675 continues south along Evans Road
1.000 mi = 1.609 km; 1.000 km = 0.621 mi: Route transition

== See also ==
- Hallam, Victoria
- Belgrave, Victoria
