= Eumemmerring =

Eumemmerring Melbourne, Victoria
- Coordinates: 37.999°S 145.247°E
- Population: 2,285 (2021 census)
  - Density: 2,080/km^{2} (5,380/sq mi)
- Postcode(s): 3177
- Area: 1.1 km^{2} (0.4 sq mi)
- Location: 32 km (20 mi) from Melbourne; 5 km (3 mi) from Dandenong
- LGA(s): City of Casey
- State electorate(s): Dandenong
- Federal division(s): Bruce
Suburbs around Eumemmerring:
Doveton	Endeavour Hills	Endeavour Hills
	Eumemmerring	Hallam
	Dandenong South	Hallam

Eumemmerring (/ˌjuːməˈmɛrɪŋ/ YOO-mə-MERR-ing) is a suburb in Melbourne, Victoria, Australia, 32 km south-east of Melbourne's Central Business District, located within the City of Casey local government area. Eumemmerring recorded a population of 2,285 at the 2021 census.

The suburb of Eumemmerring is part of the City of Casey, which is currently the fastest growing council and city in Victoria.

Eumemmerring is a small hill, offering some well located homes a view of the Endeavour Hills landscape and part of the Dandenong Ranges.

== Transport ==
Eumemmerring has many functional bus routes, connecting the suburb east to the Hallam railway station, to Westfield Fountain Gate and west to Dandenong railway station, to the Dandenong Central Business District and its main shopping centres the Armada Dandenong Plaza and Dandenong Market.

The closest train line near Eumemmerring is the Pakenham railway line which connects the South Eastern Suburbs of Melbourne to the Melbourne Central Business District.

Eumemmerring has these highways and freeways located nearby:

- South Gippsland Freeway
- Princes Highway
- Monash Freeway

== Community facilities ==
The reserves located in Eumemmerring are:

- Waratah Reserve
- Kevin Adlard Reserve
- Mystic Court Reserve
- Redfern Reserve

Doveton pool in the park is the nearest public swimming pool and is located in neighbouring Doveton (Less than 2 km from Central Eumemmerring)

Doveton Soccer Club home ground is located at Waratah Reserve, Eumemmerring.

This suburb has all of the standard shops expected from Melbourne, i.e. Fish & Chips, Milk-bar and even a tattoo shop.

== See also ==
- City of Berwick – Eumemmerring was previously within this former local government area.
