= Hampton Park, Victoria =

Hampton Park
- Suburb
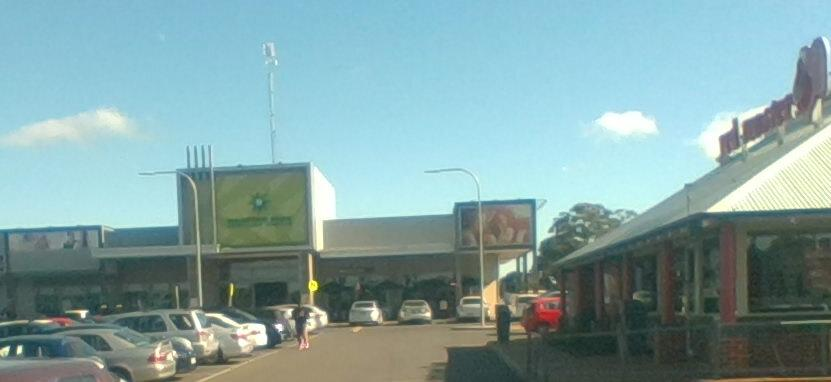
- Hampton Park Shopping Centre

- Interactive map of Hampton Park
- Coordinates: 38.029°S 145.26°E
- Country: Australia
- State: Victoria
- City: Melbourne
- LGA: City of Casey
- Location: 36 km (22 mi) from Melbourne; 9 km (5.6 mi) from Dandenong

Government
  - State electorate: Narre Warren South
  - Federal division: Holt

Area
  - Total: 14 km^{2} (5.4 sq mi)

Population
  - Total: 26,082 (2021 census)
  - Density: 1,860/km^{2} (4,830/sq mi)
- Postcode: 3976
Suburbs around Hampton Park
Dandenong South	Hallam	Narre Warren
Lyndhurst	Hampton Park	Narre Warren South
Lynbrook	Cranbourne North	Cranbourne North

Hampton Park is a suburb in Melbourne, Victoria, Australia, 36 km south-east of Melbourne's Central Business District, located within the City of Casey local government area. Hampton Park recorded a population of 26,082 at the 2021 census.

Hampton Park is bounded by the South Gippsland Freeway in the west, Centre Road in the north, a line generally parallel to Langbourne Drive in the east, and Glasscocks Road in the south.

== History ==
The original development of Hampton Park dates from the post World War I era, when the area around Somerville Road was subdivided, with the Post Office opening on 22 November 1920. Electricity was connected in Hampton Park in 1942 and town water in 1961. Until these services were connected the people relied on lamps and tank water for their light and water needs.

Development of the area commenced in the 1970s, with neighbour Lynbrook's estate development starting in 1994.

Hampton Park, Lynbrook and Lyndhurst's population grew from 1996 to 2001 due to an increase in the dwelling stock from 1996 to 2001.

== Demographics ==
In the 2016 Census, there were 25,530 people in Hampton Park. 41.7% of people were born in Australia. The next most common countries of birth were India 7.8%, Afghanistan 5.2%, Sri Lanka 4.7%, New Zealand 3.5% and Philippines 3.1%. 43.1% of people spoke only English at home. Other languages spoken at home included Sinhalese 3.8%, Dari 3.7%, Hazaraghi 3.1%, Khmer 2.5% and Punjabi 2.4%. The most common responses for religion were Catholic 24.3%, No Religion 16.8% and Islam 12.0%.

== Transport ==
The nearest railway station is Lynbrook and Hallam railway station on the Cranbourne railway line and Pakenham line respectively. Buses operate regularly to Hallam station. One of the buses (891) travels from Lynbrook railway station to Hallam railway station to Westfield Fountain Gate. Bus Route 893 travels via Hampton Park and Hallam Station from Cranbourne Park Shopping Centre to Dandenong railway station.

== Community ==
Hampton Park's town centre is situated on Hallam Road. It includes a Library, Community Hall, and a local shopping centre with a Woolworths supermarket. Hampton Park also has a high school and five primary schools, one of which being private.

The town has an Australian Rules football team competing in the Mornington Peninsula Nepean Football League. The football ground is located at Robert Booth Reserve along with Hampton Park Tennis Club.

A smaller shopping precinct exists on Pound Road with a standalone Aldi supermarket, Chemist Warehouse and 10 specialty stores.

== Churches ==
- Hampton Park Baptist Church
- St Kevins Catholic Church
- United Pentecostal Church of Lynbrook
- Aspire Church (Australian Christian Churches / AOG)
- Uniting Place (Uniting Church of Australia)
- Sts Peter and Paul Melkite Catholic Church
- Holy Trinity Anglican Church
- His Grace Worship Centre Christian Church

== Education ==
Hampton Park has a number of primary schools and one secondary college located in the community of Hampton Park and catering to its growing primary and secondary educational requirements.

Secondary College

- Hampton Park Secondary College located at 58-96 Fordholm Rd. It was established in 1986, and is located next to River Gum Primary School.

Primary Schools

- Coral Park Primary School. The school was established in 1991 and is located at 145 Coral Dr.
- River Gum Primary School. The school is located at 63 Fordholm Rd.
- St Kevin's Primary School. The school is located at 120 Hallam Road. The school was first established in 1988 on Somerville Road. In 1990, the school was relocated to the present site on Hallam Road. A parish church incorporating a chapel and hall was also built on the present site in 1991.
- Kilberry Valley Primary School. Located at Cnr Kilberry Boulevard and Warana Drive.
- Hampton Park Primary School. The school was built by Mr Robjant and opened on 5 February 1922 with 38 students in a one roomed school house, which is still being used as a classroom today and is located at 32 Somerville Road.

== Environmental issues ==
=== Fire at waste station ===
Late 2017, 30 x 40 metres sized fire started in a waste transfer station containing household waste and was under control within a few hours. Neighbouring communities were alerted of the risk of smoke heading in a northerly direction.

=== Odour pollution from Hallam Road Veolia landfill ===
Several pollution reports were sent to EPA Victoria at the end of 2020 due to the strong garbage-type smell coming from the landfill formerly owned by SUEZ on Hallam Road. The odour pollution was due to the tipping face and the company worked on covering it during the day.

Following the purchase of the landfill in 2022 by Veolia, the company received several notices from EPA for non compliance to their operating licence including a failure to reduce the risk of harm. The impact of the different odours and gases coming from the landfill were confirmed by EPA monitoring to be unlikely to cause long term impact. The company is set to submit a Landfill Gas Management plan by March 2024.

== Events ==
A partially undressed body was found at Hampton Park landfill in 2014, and was identified to be a 34 year old man from Endeavour Hills, but no additional information could be found about the man's death.

== See also ==
- City of Cranbourne – Hampton Park was previously within this former local government area.
