= Kongwak =

- Town
- Coordinates: 38°31′S 145°43′E
- Country: Australia
- State: Victoria
- LGA: South Gippsland Shire
- Location: 131 km (81 mi) SE of Melbourne; 17.6 km (10.9 mi) E of Wonthaggi

Government
  - State electorate: Bass
  - Federal division: Monash

Population
  - Total: 197 (2016 census)
- Postcode: 3951

Kongwak is a town in Victoria, Australia, and is also referred to as Victoria's 'Tornado Alley'. It is located on the Korumburra to Wonthaggi Road southeast of Melbourne, in the South Gippsland Shire. At the 2016 census, Kongwak had a population of 197.

The town in conjunction with neighbouring township Inverloch has an Australian Rules football team competing in the Alberton Football League.

The Kongwak Market is held every Sunday with collectables, retro, vintage and second hand items, plants, and books.

== History ==
The land around Kongwak was largely cleared of native vegetation and is now used for agriculture, including dairying. This land was cleared by two brothers, Richard Nutter Scott and Frederick John Scott. Richard's memorial park can be seen on the Kongwak tennis grounds.

Kongwak Post Office opened on 11 May 1898.

Williams St is prominent in the Main St with three brothers; Alfred, George, and William all serving in the first World War.

Terrestrial woodlice of the species Porcellio scaber are present in the area, and were photographed by students of Kongwak Primary School in 2020, who submitted their observation to citizen science website iNaturalist. Signs of disease in this submission inspired scientific investigation, which led to Kongwak woodlice being the first genetically confirmed hosts of Invertebrate iridescent virus 31 in the Southern Hemisphere.

Melbourne couple Damien Backholer and Gemma Cosgriff purchased the disused Kongwak Butter and Cheese Factory in 2020, with plans to turn the site into a 130-seat restaurant, art gallery, wedding venue, and accommodation. This proposed development has been met with fervent opposition from residents.
