= Hallam railway station =

Railway station in Melbourne, Australia

Hallam
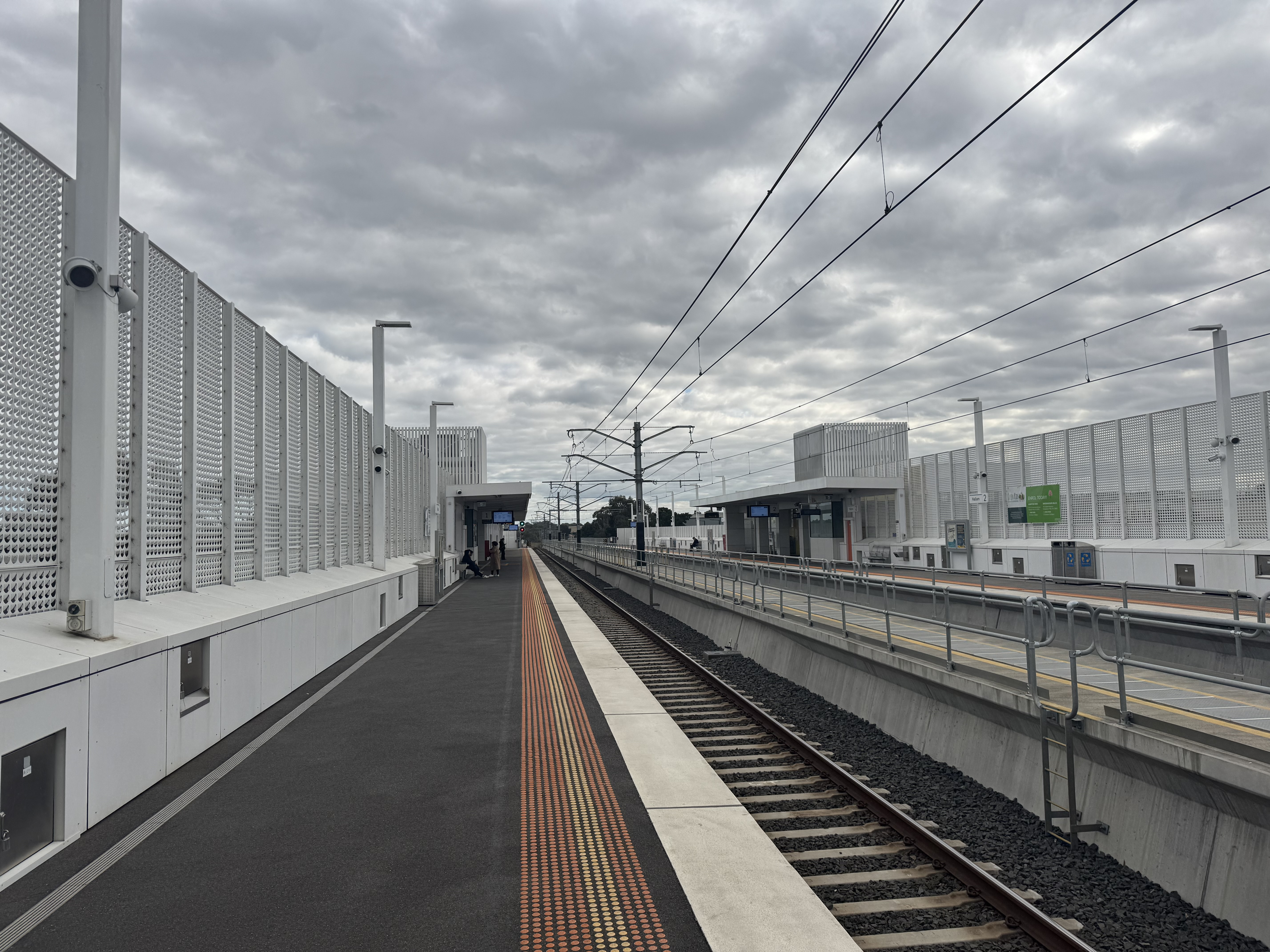
- Westbound view from Platform 1, May 2025

General information
- Location: Hallam Road, Hallam, Victoria 3803; City of Casey; Australia
- Coordinates: 38°01′04″S 145°16′13″E
- System: PTV commuter rail station
- Owner: VicTrack
- Operator: Metro Trains
- Line: Pakenham
- Distance: 37.45 kilometres from Southern Cross
- Platforms: 2 side
- Tracks: 2
- Connections: Bus

Construction
- Structure type: Elevated
- Parking: 590 spaces
- Cycle facilities: Available
- Accessible: Yes — step free access

Other information
- Status: Operational, unstaffed
- Station code: HLM
- Fare zone: Myki zone 2
- Website: Public Transport Victoria

History
- Opened: 1 December 1880; 145 years ago
- Rebuilt: 2 May 2022 (LXRP)
- Electrified: July 1954 (1500 V DC overhead)
- Former names: Hallam's Road (1880-1904)

Passengers
- 2005–2006: 474,292
- 2006–2007: 571,278 ▲20.44%
- 2007–2008: 658,474 ▲15.26%
- 2008–2009: 685,107 ▲4.04%
- 2009–2010: 706,461 ▲3.11%
- 2010–2011: 738,349 ▲4.51%
- 2011–2012: 714,059 ▼3.28%
- 2012–2013: Not measured
- 2013–2014: 612,964 ▼14.15%
- 2014–2015: 619,700 ▲1.09%
- 2015–2016: 674,464 ▲8.83%
- 2016–2017: 655,286 ▼2.84%
- 2017–2018: 583,486 ▼10.95%
- 2018–2019: 522,440 ▼10.46%
- 2019–2020: 463,500 ▼11.28%
- 2020–2021: 219,250 ▼52.69%
- 2021–2022: 118,900 ▼45.77%
- 2022–2023: 399,600 ▲236.08%
- 2023–2024: 551,600 ▲38.04%
- 2024–2025: 521,500 ▼5.46%

Services
Preceding station	Metro Trains	Following station
Dandenong towards Watergardens or Sunbury via Metro Tunnel	Pakenham line	Narre Warren towards East Pakenham
Former services
Preceding station	M-Train	Following station
General Motors towards Flinders Street	Pakenham line	Narre Warren towards Pakenham
Track layout
Location

Hallam station is a railway station operated by Metro Trains Melbourne on the Pakenham line, part of the Melbourne rail network. It serves the south-eastern suburb of Hallam, in Melbourne, Victoria, Australia. Hallam station is an elevated premium station, featuring two side platforms. It opened on 1 December 1880, with the current station provided in May 2022.

Initially opened as Hallam's Road, the station was given its current name of Hallam on 2 May 1904.

The disused General Motors station is located between Hallam and Dandenong stations.

== History ==
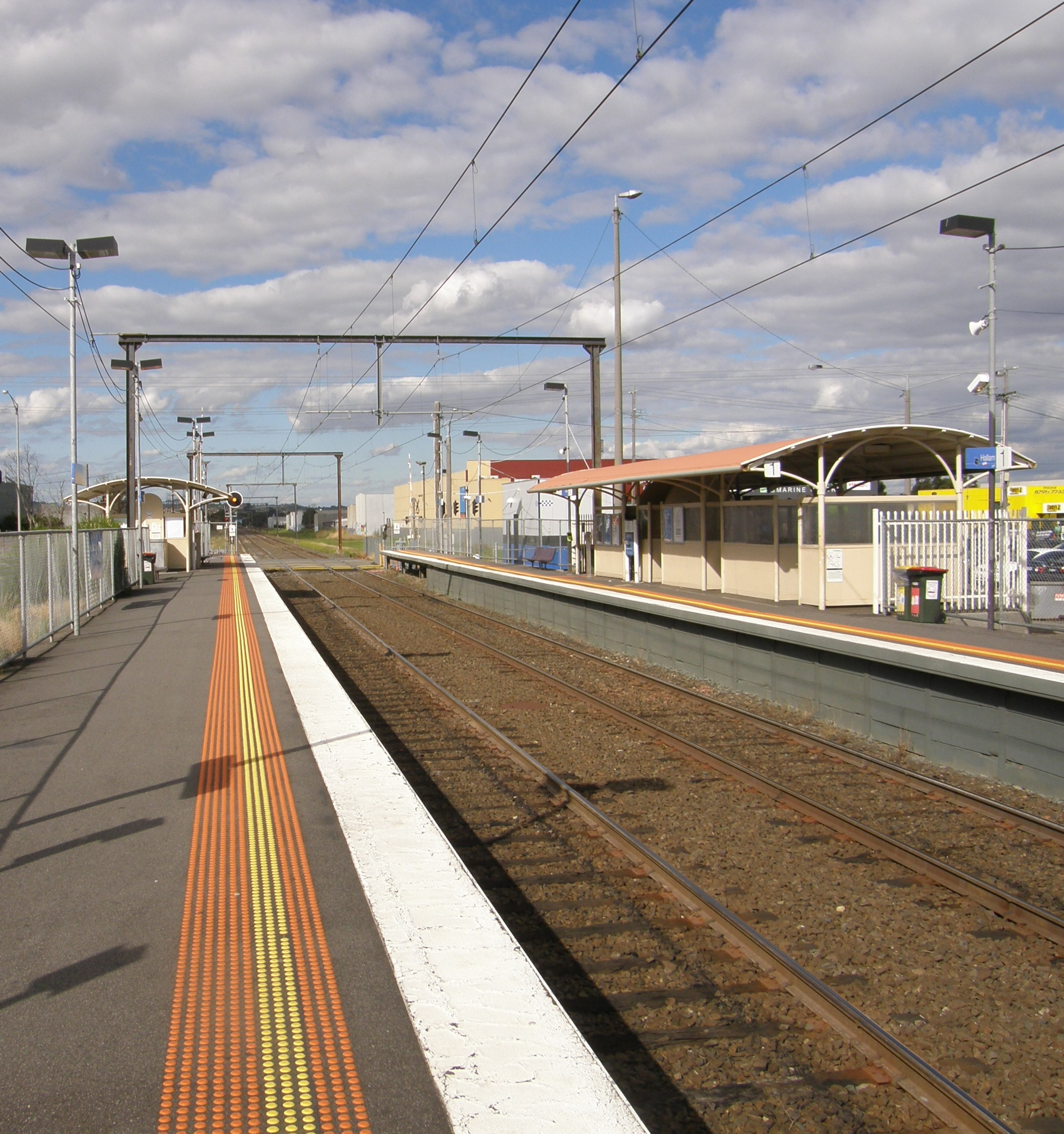
Eastbound view from the former ground level Platform 2, April 2015

Hallam station opened on 1 December 1880 as a single platform, just over three years after the railway line from Dandenong was extended to Pakenham. The station gets its name from Hallam's Road, itself named after William Hallam, who settled in the area in 1856 and operated a general store and hotel on the present day corner of the Princes Highway and Hallam Road.

In 1954, a goods siding at the station was closed. Between 1955 and 1956, the former ground level platforms were provided, when the line between Dandenong and Narre Warren was duplicated.

In 1959, flashing light signals replaced hand gates at the former Hallam South Road level crossing, which was located at the down end of the station, with boom barriers provided in 1985. On 16 July 1990, the station officially operated for passenger business only.

Sometime during or after 1995, the former ground level station shelters were provided.

On 4 May 2010, as part of the 2010/2011 State Budget, $83.7 million was allocated to upgrade Hallam to a premium station, along with nineteen others. However, in March 2011, this was scrapped by the Baillieu Government.

In 2014, it was announced that the Hallam South Road level crossing would be grade separated by the Andrews government, as originally promised by the Labor government in the 2014 Victorian state election. On 13 July 2020, the Level Crossing Removal Project announced the designs for the new, rebuilt elevated station. In January 2021, major construction works started to remove the level crossing.

On 18 March 2022, Hallam South Road level crossing and equipment were eliminated and was replaced by the elevated rail bridge over the road, which the trains started running through on 22 March 2022. On 2 April 2022, Hallam South Road reopened to traffic after being closed for fourteen days due to the removal works, resurfacing and installation of a new signalised intersection at the corner of the stations' northern car park and Hallam South Road. On 2 May 2022, the rebuilt station opened to passengers.

== Platforms and services ==
Hallam has two side platforms. It is serviced by Metro Trains' Pakenham line services.

Hallam platform arrangement
Platform	Line	Destination	Via	Service Pattern	Source
1	Pakenham line	Sunbury, Watergardens, West Footscray	Town Hall	Limited express	
2	Pakenham line	East Pakenham		All stations	

== Transport links ==
Cranbourne Transit operates three bus routes via Hallam station, under contract to Public Transport Victoria:

- 891 : Westfield Fountain Gate – Lynbrook station
- 893 : Cranbourne Park Shopping Centre – Dandenong station
- 894 : to Amberley Park (Narre Warren South)

Ventura Bus Lines operates two routes via Hallam station, under contract to Public Transport Victoria:

- 863 : Endeavour Hills Shopping Centre – Cranbourne West
- Night Bus 982 : Dandenong station – Cranbourne (Saturday and Sunday mornings only)
