= Dandenong North =

Dandenong North Melbourne, Victoria
- Coordinates: 37.959°S 145.208°E
- Population: 22,550 (2021 census)
  - Density: 2,374/km^{2} (6,150/sq mi)
- Postcode(s): 3175
- Area: 9.5 km^{2} (3.7 sq mi)
- Location: 27 km (17 mi) from Melbourne; 4 km (2 mi) from Dandenong
- LGA(s): City of Greater Dandenong
- State electorate(s): Dandenong; Mulgrave
- Federal division(s): Bruce
Suburbs around Dandenong North:
	Mulgrave	Rowville
Noble Park North	Dandenong North	Endeavour Hills
Noble Park	Dandenong	Doveton

Dandenong North is a suburb in Melbourne, Victoria, Australia, located 27 kilometers southeast of the Melbourne CBD, within the City of Greater Dandenong local government area. With a population of over 22,500 people according to the 2021 census, it's a sizeable suburban community. The area has a mix of residential areas in close proximity to both Monash and Eastlink Freeways.

== Local Heritage ==
Ferring Homestead

Ferring Homestead, located on Carlton Road in Dandenong North, is a historically significant site symbolising the region’s transition from agricultural to suburban development, as noted in a council heritage report. Originally owned by A. Smart, the 20-acre property was acquired by farmer Frank Shobbrock in 1919, who built a timber-clad Edwardian-style house with high-pitched gable roofs and outbuildings in 1920. Ownership changed hands multiple times, with L.L. Smith (1925), Jason Jenkins (1932), Robert J. Scanlon (1935), R.E. McDonald (1939, adding 49 acres on Carlton Road), and James Semple (1942) before Lady Doris Mary Luxton purchased it in 1945 for £1,000 above its rated value.

Lady Luxton, who also owned 99 acres on Stud Road and 20 acres on McFees Road, divided the property in 1947 with William Harold Luxton, a prominent local figure and former Mayor of Melbourne in the 1930s, who took the homestead allotment and lived there from 1949 to 1952. The homestead’s association with influential owners and its Edwardian architecture highlight its cultural and historical importance to Dandenong’s heritage.

== Schools ==
- Lyndale Secondary College (1961)
- Wooranna Park Primary School (1971)
- Emerson School (1973)
- St Elizabeth's School (1978)
- Rosewood Downs Primary School (1981)
- Lyndale Greens Primary School] (2010)

== Sport ==
Dandenong Stadium

Dandenong Stadium is one of the Victoria's premier sporting facilities, as a multipurpose venue Dandenong Stadium can cater for up to 15 basketball courts and 19 volleyball courts. The stadium also has a 250 seated capacity function room and a fully equipped gym and is located at 270 Stud Road Dandenong North. The stadium is the home to the Dandenong Basketball Association and Volleyball Victoria.

Rosswood Tennis Club

Rosswood Tennis Club has three Australian Open Plexipave Hardcourts and three Synthetic Grass courts with lighting and is situated at the entrance to Tirhatuan Park, 112a Somerset Drive, Dandenong North, Victoria.

Lyndale United FC

Established in 1977, Lyndale United FC are a local community football club (soccer) based in Dandenong North. The club has a long and proud history in the Victorian State leagues.

== Demographics ==
The 2021 census identifies the most common ancestries in Dandenong North as Australian (13.7%), English (13.4%), Indian (6.7%), Greek (5.5%) and Chinese (5.4%). The most common languages spoken at home, other than English are Greek (4.2%), Vietnamese (3.9%), Sinhalese (3.8%), Arabic (3.7%), Serbian (3.4%). The most common religious affiliation is Catholic (21.6%), Islam (12.8%), Orthodox Christian (9.3%), Buddhism (7.3%) with 18.4% of residents ascribing to no religion.

== See also ==
- City of Dandenong – Dandenong North was previously within this former local government area.
