= Staghorn Flat =

- Town
- Coordinates: 36°15′2″S 146°55′40″E
- Country: Australia
- State: Victoria
- Region: Hume
- LGAs: Shire of Indigo; City of Wodonga

Government
  - State electorate: Benambra
  - Federal division: Indi

Population
  - Total: 293 (2016 census)
- Postcode: 3691

Staghorn Flat is a locality in the Yackandandah Valley of north east Victoria, situated between Wodonga and Yackandandah. It is shared between the Shire of Indigo and the City of Wodonga. At the 2016 census Staghorn Flat had a population of 293.
