= Cranbourne Park Shopping Centre =

Australian shopping centre

- Location: Cranbourne, Victoria, Australia
- Coordinates: 38°6′S 145°17′E
- Opened: 1979
- Manager: Vicinity Centres
- Owner: Vicinity Centres (50%)
- Num. of stores: 141
- Num. of anchor tenants: 5
- Floor area: 46,981 m^{2} (505,700 sq ft)
- Floors: 1
- Parking: 1,700
- Website: www.cranbournepark.com.au

Cranbourne Park Shopping Centre is a single-level regional shopping centre, located approximately 42 kilometres south-east of the Melbourne CBD in the suburb of Cranbourne. The centre was first opened in 1979 and was acquired by Vicinity Centres in 2000. The centre includes major retailers Kmart, Target, Coles, TK Maxx, Harris Scarfe, JB Hi-Fi, Best & Less and Cotton On Mega, and also smaller businesses including Forever New, Dotti, Jeanswest, Just Jeans and Sportsgirl. The centre has an average annual traffic of 6.1 million people per year.

== Redevelopment ==
In 2015, the centre underwent a major redevelopment. This redevelopment included a major mall upgrade, new dining precinct, addition of a Target store, and a new, relocated Harris Scarfe department store. The dining precinct includes Schnitz and the Groove Train.

== Major retailers ==
- Target
- Kmart
- Coles
- Harris Scarfe
- JB Hi-Fi
- Best & Less
- TK Maxx
