= Hallam, Victoria =

Hallam
- Suburb
- Interactive map of Hallam
- Coordinates: 38.009°S 145.268°E
- Country: Australia
- State: Victoria
- City: Melbourne
- LGA: City of Casey
- Location: 34 km (21 mi) from Melbourne; 6 km (3.7 mi) from Dandenong

Government
  - State electorate: Narre Warren North
  - Federal division: Bruce

Area
  - Total: 7.9 km^{2} (3.1 sq mi)

Population
  - Total: 11,355 (2021 census)
  - Density: 1,437/km^{2} (3,723/sq mi)
- Postcode: 3803
Suburbs around Hallam
Doveton	Endeavour Hills	Narre Warren North
Eumemmering	Hallam	Narre Warren
Dandenong South	Hampton Park	Narre Warren South

Hallam is a suburb in Melbourne, Victoria, Australia, 34 km south-east of Melbourne's Central Business District, located within the City of Casey local government area. Hallam recorded a population of 11,355 at the 2021 census.

The suburb has its own railway station.

Hallam is bounded by the South Gippsland Freeway in the west, Eumemmerring Creek and Hallam North Road in the north, a drain easement in the east, and Centre Road in the south.

== History ==
The post office opened on the 1 May 1889. It closed in 1981, but reopened in 1994.

The railway station opened as Hallam's Road Railway Station. It was renamed Hallam's about 1910 and Hallam about 1925.

== Demographics ==
According to 2016 Census the most common ancestries in Hallam were English 13.4%, Australian 11.9%, Afghan 8.3%, Indian 5.7% and Sri Lankan 3.9%. 42.3% of residents were born in Australia. The next most common countries of birth were Afghanistan 8.1%, India 5.5%, Sri Lanka 4.7%, New Zealand 2.5% and England 1.9%. The most common responses for religion in Hallam were Catholic 21.5%, Islam 20.0%, No Religion, so described 15.4%, Not stated 8.1% and Buddhism 5.5%. Two in every five people (40.8%) spoke only English at home. Other languages spoken at home included Dari 7.0%, Arabic 3.8%, Sinhalese 3.0%, Hazaraghi 2.8% and Punjabi 2.3%.

Of the 4,953 people who reported being in the labour force in the week before Census night in Hallam, 56.9% were employed full time, 28.9% were employed part-time and 9.3% were unemployed.

== See also ==
- City of Berwick – Hallam was previously within this former local government area.
