= Dandenong South =

Dandenong South Melbourne, Victoria
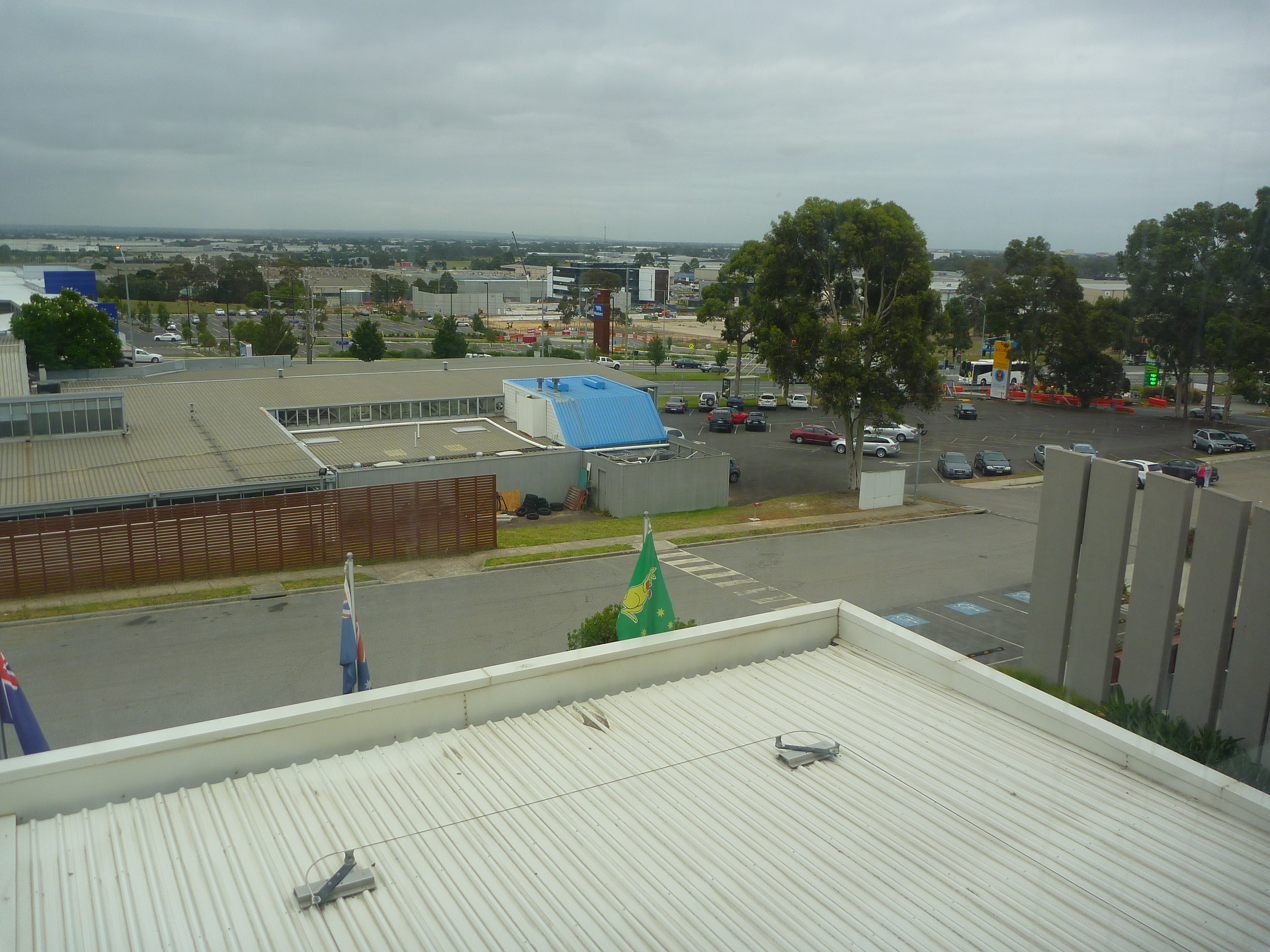

- Coordinates: 38.031°S 145.215°E
- Population: 125 (2021 census)
  - Density: 21.93/km^{2} (56.8/sq mi)
- Postcode(s): 3175
- Area: 5.7 km^{2} (2.2 sq mi)
- Location: 31 km (19 mi) from Melbourne; 4 km (2 mi) from Dandenong
- LGA(s): City of Greater Dandenong
- State electorate(s): Carrum; Dandenong
- Federal division(s): Isaacs
Mean max temp	Mean min temp	Annual rainfall
19.6 °C; 67 °F	9.0 °C; 48 °F	762.2 mm 30 in
Suburbs around Dandenong South:
Dandenong	Doveton	Eumemmerring
Keysborough	Dandenong South	Hallam
Bangholme	Lyndhurst	Hampton Park

Dandenong South is a suburb in Melbourne, Victoria, Australia, 31 km south-east of Melbourne's central business district, located within the City of Greater Dandenong local government area. Dandenong South recorded a population of 125 at the 2021 census.

Dandenong South is a primarily industrialised suburb that borders Hallam and the City of Casey region. The suburb contains the closed General Motors railway station on the Gippsland railway line.

Dandenong South is home to A Company of the Australian Army Reserve unit, 5th/6th Battalion, Royal Victoria Regiment and DefendTex. Walkinshaw Automotive Group established a factory in Dandenong South in 2025.

== See also ==
- City of Cranbourne – Parts of Dandenong South were previously within this former local government area.
- City of Dandenong – Parts of Dandenong South were previously within this former local government area.
