= Doveton =

- Suburb
- Interactive map of Doveton
- Coordinates: 37.988°S 145.239°E
- Country: Australia
- State: Victoria
- City: Melbourne
- LGA: City of Casey
- Location: 31 km (19 mi) from Melbourne; 2 km (1.2 mi) from Dandenong

Government
  - State electorate: Dandenong
  - Federal division: Bruce

Area
  - Total: 3.9 km^{2} (1.5 sq mi)

Population
  - Total: 9,603 (2021 census)
  - Density: 2,460/km^{2} (6,380/sq mi)
- Postcode: 3177
Suburbs around Doveton
Dandenong North	Endeavour Hills	Endeavour Hills
Dandenong	Doveton	Eumemmerring
Dandenong South	Dandenong South

Doveton is a suburb in Melbourne, Victoria, Australia, 31 km south-east of Melbourne's Central Business District, located within the City of Casey local government area. Doveton recorded a population of 9,603 at the 2021 census.

Doveton is bounded by Dandenong Creek and Power Road in the west, the Monash Freeway in the north, Eumemmerring Creek in the east, and Princes Highway in the south.

== History ==
Originally part of the Eumemmerring pastoral run in the 1830s, Doveton gained its name from prominent early settler and Gold Commissioner, Captain Francis Crossman Doveton, who remained until around 1903.

Named around 1954, it was transformed into a public housing estate to house the post-war population increase caused by a surge in displaced people from war torn countries and an industrial boom in Dandenong. This is disputed.

Doveton Post Office opened on 1 December 1956 as the suburb was developing and booming. An example is that when it was first opened several of the state schools and colleges had increasing enrolments and had booming popularity and growth, and this is the reason why the post office was opened – the population continued to increase.

Sometime in 1967 the first library was opened by residents, during a period when Doveton lacked any community services or facilities. Around this time Doveton gained its first council representation.

Doveton has been studied by sociology academics since the 1960s. The results of the study were published in the book 'An Australian Newtown' written by Lois Bryson and Faith Thompson in 1972. While Doveton was not specifically mentioned it is clear from the map of the area and the dates published that it is the sole subject of this book.

== Attractions ==
A big attraction is Myuna Farm, an interactive animal farm where people can come to meet farm animals. The farm has a train for children to ride to the outer sections of the farm. It is a popular venue for children and hosts an annual Christmas carol event.

Melbourne's second largest grey-headed flying fox camp is located at the Myuna Farm wetlands. These mega-bats are important pollinators of native tree species.

The Doveton Show is held annually as a volunteer-run community event coinciding with the Melbourne Show.

== Education ==
Schools within Doveton include one state school (Doveton College) for Prep – Grade 9, one Catholic primary school (Holy Family Primary School) and one Christian primary school (Maranatha Christian School) for Prep – Grade 6, as well as two Muslim Schools (Ilim College and Minaret College)

== Sport ==
The town has 2 Australian Rules football teams, The Doveton Doves Football Club which competes in Division 2 in the Southern Football League, and The Doveton Eagles, competing in Division 4. Coincidentally, both clubs were premiers in 2019 in their respective competitions.

Doveton Soccer Club participates in the Victorian State League Division 1 South-East and play their home games at Waratah South Reserve, Eumemmerring. Since 2016 there has also been a Doveton boxing club which affiliates with Boxing Australia.

The Doveton Steelers play rugby league in NRL Victoria.

== Places of worship ==
- Church of All Nations
- St Matthews Anglican Endeavour Hills
- Miracle Christian Center
- Doveton Baptist Church
- Doveton Mosque
- The Shed
- Pillars of Guidance Community Centre (PGCC)
- Holy Family Parish Doveton https://holyfamilydoveton.org.au/

== See also ==
- City of Berwick – Doveton was previously within this former local government area.
