= Casey Radio =

Casey Radio 3SER

Cranbourne East, Victoria; Australia
- Broadcast area: City of Casey; City of Greater Dandenong
- Frequency: 97.7 MHz
- Branding: Casey Radio (from 2003)

Programming
- Languages: English, LOTE
- Format: Community, Ethnic, Sport, Religion, Music, Youth and School

Ownership
- Owner: Market City Radio Inc. South Eastern Radio Association Inc.

History
- First air date: 1984 (as Market City Radio); 1987 (as 3SER)
- Former frequencies: 88.3 MHz
- Call sign meaning: 3South Eastern Radio

Technical information
- ERP: 400 watts
- HAAT: 12 meters
- Transmitter coordinates: 38.003889°S 145.328611°E

Links
- Webcast: Tune-in
- Website: www.3ser.org.au

Casey Radio 3SER is a non-commercial community radio station which caters to the greater south-eastern suburbs of Melbourne, Australia.

As a community broadcaster, Casey Radio's role is to provide general local community programming including entertainment, news and information, and aims to "inform, entertain and involve" its listeners. The station caters to the communities' diverse needs with an eclectic mix, ranging from local council news to sport, country to comedy, retro to modern, rock to rockabilly, and a wide diversity of ethnic and multilingual programmes.

The current Association President is Nia McMartin.

== Broadcast Area ==
Their licence covers an area of 637.6 km^{2} and 410 514 residents ^{(2017)}. This includes most of the City of Casey and the City of Greater Dandenong, and eastern parts of the City of Frankston. The transmitter is limited to a maximum 400 watts of power and is located at a former landfill site off Quarry Road in Narre Warren North, Victoria.

The Melbourne South East RA1 licence is bounded

- north by Noble Park, Dandenong North, most of Endeavour Hills, and Narre Warren North;
- north-east by Harkaway;
- east by Berwick (and part of Beaconsfield), Clyde North, and Clyde;
- south-east by Tooradin (and part of Dalmore);
- south by Blind Bight, Warneet, and Pearcedale;
- south-west by Langwarrin South, and Langwarrin;
- west by Carrum Downs, parts of Patterson Lakes, Chelsea Heights, Aspendale Gardens, Braeside, and part of Mordialloc (north of Woodlands Golf Club); and
- north-west by Dingley Village, Springvale South, and Springvale.

== History ==
Casey Radio began life as Market City Radio in 1983, and the first test transmission was carried out from JC Mills Reserve, Dandenong on 6 May 1984. A further transmission later occurred from the Dandenong Show.

After a 2-year hiatus, the station was revived by several early members, particularly life member Fred Harrison (originally from 3RPP), who assisted in the original licence application.

Station facilities were established at Fountain Gate Shopping Centre on Magid Drive, Narre Warren in 1987. The frequency allotted for testing was 88.3 MHz, and the test transmissions were broad, extending to the Peninsula and the City of Knox. Some listeners even reported receiving the signal from Coburg and Geelong (which are 42 km and 83 km away respectively). These test transmissions continued four times a year (a week each time).

Graeme Lewis and Andrew Tokely formed part of a technical team that oversaw the construction of the original transmission tower in April 1991. A full-time broadcast licence was later granted on 7 July 1991. Broadcasts were originally between 6am and midnight. The station celebrated its officially opening on 30 September 1991, and moved to another location at the shopping complex shortly thereafter.

David Lentin (a former Melbourne radio personality and Victoria Police detective, now deceased) became president of the ailing station in 1996. He and longtime volunteer Jim Hines are credited for turning 3SER around, and were responsible for the decision to venture into outside broadcasts at local sporting events.

Later in the mid-1990s, the station moved to a location in Narre Warren on the corner of Princes Highway and Webb Street.

In September 2002, 3SER FM moved into their current council-owned premises in Cranbourne East known as the Casey Complex. The City of Casey retained ownership but agreed from 2003 to provide financial support and grants in exchange for station presenters highlighting the term "Casey Radio" during announcements.

Webcasting of the signal began on 15 July 2005.

In 2007 after almost 16 years, efforts to improve the stations' broadcast signal required building a new comms building and antenna and the disassembly of the old one. This was a joint cooperation between the City of Casey and Telstra.

After Mr Lentin took ill in late 2007, Geoff Ablett stepped in as station manager whilst also balancing a few stints as City of Casey mayor.

The 2008-09 period was tumultuous for the Cranbourne station, having secured a further 4 years of council funding but still trying to establish "transparent management practices". Efforts were made to establish a sub-committee, new board members welcomed and salaried staff were employed.

3SER began refreshing its identity and logo, utilising the Casey Radio moniker (to which had a couple of iterations between 2011 and 2014), and some funds had been put aside to bring a new website to fruition. New station signage at the Casey Complex was installed.

The City of Casey quarantined an allocation of $75 000 in funding from the 2017-18 financial year in part due to perceived poor governance and relationship with the council. A report to the council on progress made is due in 6 months, upon which time the held funds may be released.

== Sport ==
Casey Radio is a media partner of the Victorian Football League and Victorian Premier Cricket competitions, an arrangement that has continued since it began in 1993. The station hosted a special Saturday morning radio program in winter for the VFL, and summer for the Victorian Premier Cricket competition, and then follows this by broadcasting matches of both competitions live on weekends. Currently it broadcasts the S.E.F.N.L. Game of the Day on Saturdays and the VFL Game of the Day on Sundays.

Casey Radio also broadcasts from many charity-related sporting events, as well as Indoor cricket, Netball, Baseball (Claxton Shield), Basketball (NBL), Picnic Racing, (Non TAB) Soccer and Boxing.

== See also ==
- Community Radio
- City of Casey
- List of radio stations in Australia
