= Pearcedale =

- Town
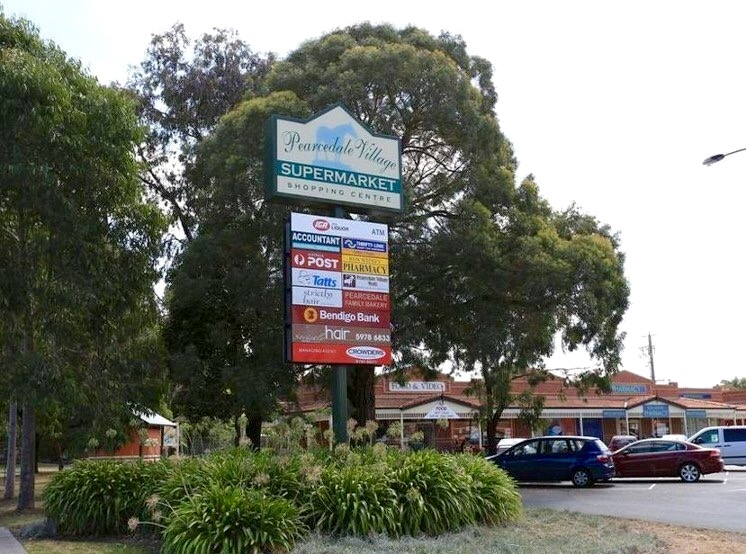
- Pearcedale Village Shops, Baxter-Tooradin Road, Pearcedale. The horse logo on the sign identifies with many in the region.

- Interactive map of Pearcedale
- Coordinates: 38.203°S 145.243°E
- Country: Australia
- State: Victoria
- LGAs: City of Casey; Shire of Mornington Peninsula
- Location: 49 km (30 mi) from Melbourne; 12 km (7.5 mi) from Frankston; 12 km (7.5 mi) from Hastings
- Established: 1907

Government
  - State electorate: Bass
  - Federal divisions: Holt; Flinders

Area
  - Total: 33.6 km^{2} (13.0 sq mi)
- Elevation: 2 m (6.6 ft)

Population
  - Total: 3,867 (2021 census)
  - Density: 115.09/km^{2} (298.1/sq mi)
- Postcode: 3912
- Mean max temp: 20.1 °C (68.2 °F)
- Mean min temp: 8.3 °C (46.9 °F)
Localities around Pearcedale
Langwarrin	Cranbourne South	Devon Meadows
Langwarrin South	Pearcedale	Cannons Creek
Baxter	Somerville	Western Port

Pearcedale is a town in Victoria, Australia, 49 km south-east of Melbourne's Central Business District, located within the City of Casey and the Shire of Mornington Peninsula local government areas. Pearcedale recorded a population of 3,867 at the 2021 census.

A bus service operates to and from Frankston station via Baxter as well as a service to Cranbourne station via Botanic Ridge.

== Geography ==
Pearcedale is a township and rural locality on the northwestern corner of Western Port, in the northern extremities of the Mornington Peninsula. The land is relatively flat with a rich and sandy soil type ideal for market gardening. Its mangrove saltmarsh coastline on Watson Inlet, west of Quail Island, includes the Langwarrin Creek estuary as well as numerous other small creek estuaries. These mangrove saltmarshes are of international significance and are incorporated within the Yaringa Marine National Park as well as being protected under the United Nations Ramsar Convention. The mangrove saltmarshes are not accessible, by land, to the public.

== History ==
=== General ===
Pearcedale was originally called Langwarrin and was also known at various times as Langwarrin Estate or Old Langwarrin. When the Mornington and Stony Point railway lines opened in the late 1880s, the railway station near the Military Camp (now a Flora and Fauna Reserve) was named Langwarrin. A new town developed east of the railway station and was locally called New Langwarrin. A meeting of rate payers was held in November 1905 and it was voted to rename the original town Pearcedale, to avoid confusion with this new settlement of New Langwarrin. The name Pearcedale came from local landowner Nathaniel Pearce. Nathaniel and his wife Mary Grace are first listed in the Shire of Cranbourne Rate Books in 1894, when they purchased an orchard on 26 acres (about 10 hectares) at Langwarrin Estate. They had eight children. Mary was a midwife and helped deliver many babies in the area.

The town of Pearcedale had a slow beginning. In 1889 it had a few shops and a post office, public hall and primary school. However, the 1890s depression affected the town, and the school closed in 1892, and the post office in 1893. The school re-opened in 1902 and the post office in 1907. The original hall burnt down and the replacement was opened on 23 August 1918. This event was witnessed by 400 people, who were entertained with a concert and a dance which finished at 4:00 am. The Methodist church was opened in 1918, the Anglican church in 1938. Other Community milestones include the establishment of the tennis club in the 1920s, the cricket club in 1921, the football club in 1929, the Progress Association in 1937 and the fire brigade in 1940. Electricity was connected in 1957, the Guides and Scouts both formed in 1957, the R.S.L in 1958 and the Infant Welfare Centre in 1961. Town water was connected in 1962.

=== Meteorites ===
A meteorite known as Cranbourne meteorite No.11 was found 2 kilometres north north-east of Pearcedale and 5 kilometres east-south east of the Langwarrin Railway Station. The meteorite weighed a massive 762 kilograms and was reportedly found in 1903, just below the surface of the ground. The find was not reported at the time and, from all accounts the meteorite was kept in the possession of the finder until 1938, when it was sold to the U.S. National Museum, Washington.

Another known as Cranbourne meteorite No.12 was discovered in April 1982 it was donated to the then Shire Council for display purposes. This meteorite was first found in 1927 but only recently came to scientific notice. Weighing 23 kilograms it has been registered in the collections of the National Museum of Victoria and is on a long-term loan to the City of Casey, for display purposes. It was found on a property located on the north-east corner of Pearcedale Road, Pearcedale.

In 2013 Cranbourne meteorite 13 was found at the intersection of North Road and Pearcedale Road. CSIRO took possession shortly after and it has since been classified as the third largest Mars based meteorite found in the southern hemisphere.

== Culture ==
The town is surrounded by many horse and hobby properties, market gardens, cattle, egg and poultry farms. Much of the locality is zoned as "green wedge" and therefore future urban development in the region is limited. Pearcedale Primary School is notable as being the regional school responsible for the teaching of children impaired by hearing loss. The school has an enrolment of 950 students and is widely acknowledged as being of high standard.

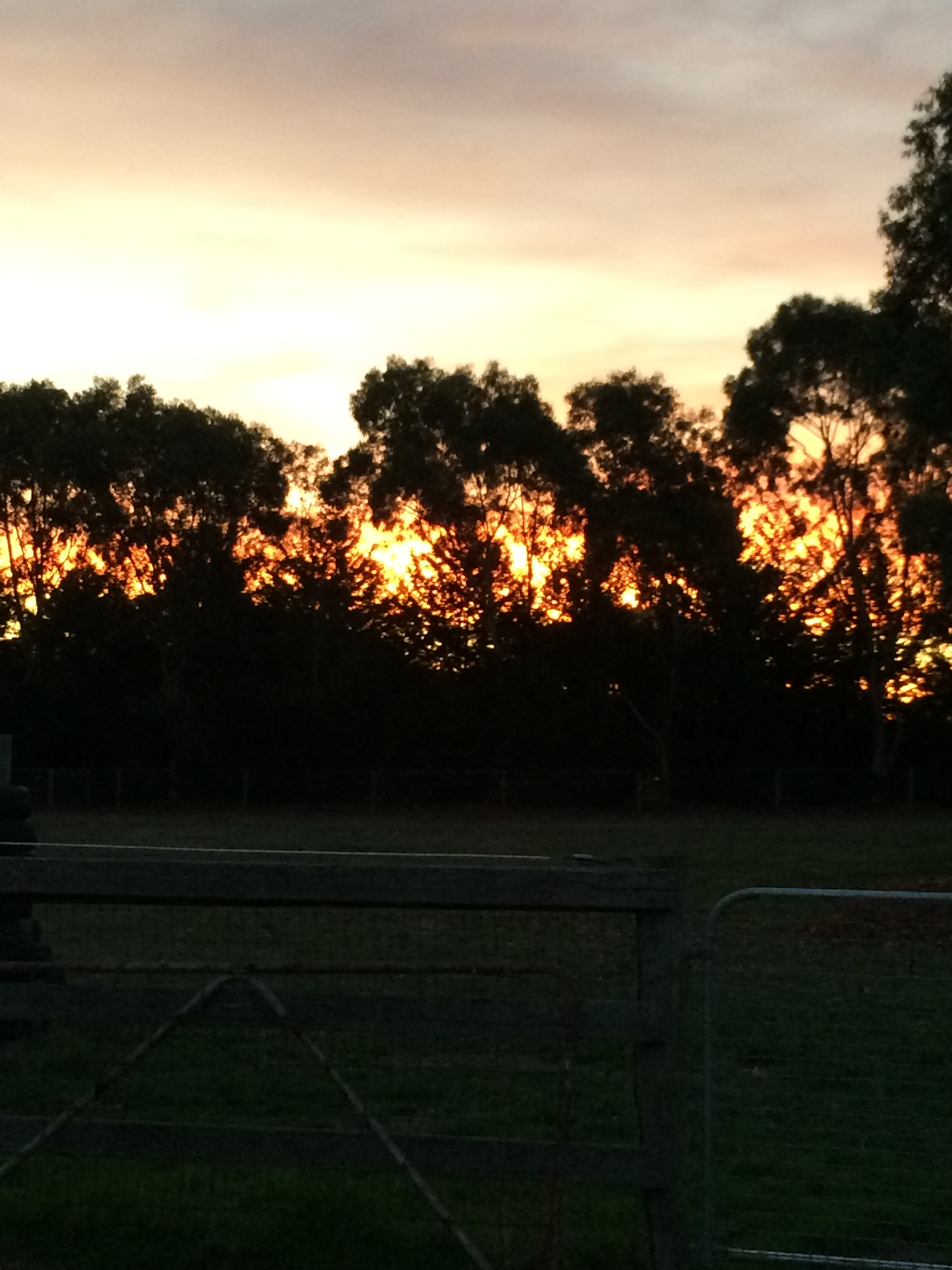
Rural sunset, Pearcedale, Victoria, Australia

Local attractions include the multiple award-winning Moonlit Sanctuary Wildlife Conservation Park, which operates during the daytime and has special evening tours that allow visitors to see endangered Australian animals. Moonlit Sanctuary is part of the Official Mornington Peninsula Tourism Guide.

The RSPCA Peninsula Adoption Centre & Shelter is based in Pearcedale. Here employees and volunteers care for homeless cats and dogs as well as rescued horses and ponies from the Peninsula region. There is also a public veterinary clinic in operation at the facility.

One of the largest herb farms in the southern hemisphere, Coolibah Herbs, is based in Pearcedale. It supplies washed salad greens, mixed leaves and a variety of culinary herbs and vegetables to leading companies in the food service sector. It has numerous farms across the Mornington Peninsula and Gippsland.

Pearcedale has its own Country Fire Authority station that draws on the local community for volunteers.

=== Pearcedale Temple Proposal Rejection ===
On August 7, 2025, the Victorian Civil and Administrative Tribunal (VCAT) rejected a $4.5 million proposal for a temple and religious facility in Pearcedale, located within Victoria’s Mornington Peninsula Green Wedge Zone. The tribunal ruled that the development, which included a main temple complex and parking for 60 cars, was incompatible with the Green Wedge Zone’s purpose of preserving agriculture, sustainable land management, biodiversity, and rural landscapes. The proposed development stood in marked contrast with its surrounds, and its religious and cultural expression, and symbolic architecture bore no resemblance or contextual relationship to existing structures in the locality or the rural landscape, rendering it a prominent and discordant built form. The proposal was also rejected due to unacceptable biodiversity impacts, including the loss of native vegetation, such as endangered swampy woodland and swamp scrub, with some areas holding high strategic biodiversity value.

=== Transport ===
Public Transport Victoria through Ventura operates route 776, a service to and from Frankston railway station, via Frankston South, Baxter and Langwarrin South, and route 792 (operated by Cranbourne Transit), which runs to Cranbourne, via Botanic Ridge.

Yaringa Marina, located a short drive south-east of the township in neighbouring Somerville, provides boat access to Western Port.

=== Shopping ===
Pearcedale Village Shopping Centre on Baxter-Tooradin Road is a small retail development.

The Pearcedale Farmers Market operates outdoors on a seasonal schedule.

=== Sport ===
With its convenient proximity to Cranbourne, Mornington and metropolitan racecourses Pearcedale is home to numerous racehorse trainers, jockeys and others associated with Victoria's thoroughbred racing industry. A number of greyhound and harness racing trainers also reside in the area.

Equestrian trails and private agistment facilities provide many equestrian enthusiasts with the opportunity to enjoy their craft. Local pony clubs provide dressage, show jumping and cross-country facilities for young equestrian enthusiasts. Pearcedale Pony Club hold a rally for its members on the second Sunday of each month. The club is affiliated with the Pony Club Association of Victoria.

Pearcedale Football & Netball Club represent the town in men's and women's Australian Rules football and women's netball in the local Mornington Peninsula Nepean Football League. The clubs foundations were built within the former Peninsula Football League, in 1905. The junior Australian rules football club, Pearcedale-Baxter Junior Football Club, have junior boys and girls teams competing in the Frankston & District Junior Football League.

Pearcedale Cricket Club was founded in 1921 in the North Peninsula Cricket Association. The club fields senior and junior teams in the Mornington Peninsula Cricket Association.

Pearcedale Tennis Club compete in the Peninsula Tennis Association.

=== Education ===
Pearcedale is serviced by one primary school:

- Pearcedale Primary School

A primary catholic school is located in nearby Somerville:

- St Brendens Catholic Primary School

For their secondary education local students commute to several schools in the surrounding area including:

Government Schools:

- Elisabeth Murdoch College, Langwarrin
- Frankston High School, Frankston
- Mount Erin Secondary College, Frankston South
- Somerville Secondary College, Somerville

Private Schools:

- Bayside Christian College, Langwarrin South
- Casey Grammar, Cranbourne East
- Flinders Christian Community College, Tyabb
- John Paul College, Frankston
- Padua College, Tyabb
- Padua College, Mornington
- St Peter’s College, Cranbourne West
- The Peninsula School, Mount Eliza
- Toorak College, Mount Eliza
- Woodleigh School, Frankston South

== Notable people ==
- Matthew Millar, Footballer
- Matt Cottrell, Australian Rules Footballer
- Cam Sinclair, Professional Freestyle Motocross Rider
- Ben Ashkenazi, Cricketer

== See also ==
- Mornington Peninsula and Western Port Biosphere Reserve
