= Connected Libraries =

Public library service in Victoria, Australia

- Location: 65 Berwick - Cranbourne Road, Cranbourne, Victoria, 3977
- Type: Public library
- Established: 1 October 1996 (29 years ago)
- Service area: City of Casey
- Branches: 6

Access and use
- Population served: 369,453

Other information
- Website: https://www.connectedlibraries.org.au/

Connected Libraries, previously Casey Cardinia Libraries, is one of Victoria's largest public library services. It serves more than 369,000 people in the City of Casey.

Connected Libraries is funded by the City of Casey and the Victorian State Government.

== History ==
Casey Cardinia Library Corporation (CCL), was formed on 1 October 1996. It was previously part of the Dandenong Valley Regional Library Service (DVRLS) which was disbanded following Council amalgamations in 1995. The City of Greater Dandenong took over operations of the Dandenong and Springvale branches and CCL continued to operate the remaining branches from its headquarters in Cranbourne. In 2017, the library administration and technical services was decentralised. Some members of the newly named Regional Support team predominantly work out of either Cranbourne or Doveton Library. Other Regional Support staff work remotely or on site at different branch locations or in the offices of either Council.

In December 2022, the Shire of Cardinia left the Casey Cardinia Library Corporation, which became the sole library service for the City of Casey. In response, the Casey Cardinia Library Corporation conducted a community survey and Connected Libraries was chosen as its new trading name.

== Branches ==
=== Bunjil Place Library ===
Bunjil Place Library first opened as Narre Warren Library in Malcolm Court, Narre Warren in 1978. In 1992, it moved into premises at Fountain Gate Shopping Centre adjacent to the City of Berwick offices. At 1350 square metres, it was the largest of the CCL libraries. In October 2017, the library relocated to 2 Patrick Northeast Drive as part of the Bunjil Place complex, a "mix of facilities, including an outdoor community plaza, theatre, multipurpose studio, function centre, library gallery and City of Casey Customer Service Centre, all in one place."

=== Cranbourne Library ===
Cranbourne Shire Library began providing library services from the former Engineer's offices in Sladen street in 1978. The formation of CCL in 1996 led to the establishment of 'Headquarters' and the relocation of Cranbourne branch to part of the former Ford Factory in Berwick Cranbourne Road, now known as the Casey Indoor Leisure Complex, which includes Casey Stadium. The library was renovated and extended in 2002. In 2017, the Local History Archive and Narre Warren & District Family History Group were relocated to the facilities adjacent to the library.

=== Cranbourne West Library Lounge ===
Part of the Cranbourne West Community Hub, this branch opened in January 2024.

=== Doveton Library ===
After a couple of earlier incarnations, the Shire of Berwick rented the Presbyterian Church Hall as library premises in 1969. It moved to 148 Kidd Road where it became the 2nd branch (after Springvale) of the DVRLS in 1973. The council then purchased a Service station in Autumn Place next to the shopping centre and, after extensive renovations, opened the current Doveton library there in 1983. The library was renovated and extended in 2008.

=== Endeavour Hills Library ===
Rapid population growth in Endeavour Hills in the early 1980s resulted in the construction of a permanent library to replace the mobile service. The building was officially opened in Raymond McMahon Boulevard on 31 May 1987. IT is co-located with the Endeavour Hills Leisure Centre, adjacent to the Endeavour Hills Shopping Centre. A 2007 renovation and extension has significantly increased the size of the library. In 2019, a new 1200m2 town square was completed between the library and the leisure centre. The Town Square provides space for civic celebrations with seating space and shade materials, and also incorporates a skate park.

=== Hampton Park Library ===
Hampton Park Library opened in January 2004, adjacent to Arthur Wren Hall. An application to extend the Library through a Living Libraries Grant resulted in a building extension, adding an additional 30% in public space. The official opening of the Hampton Park library extension (of 270 m2) and newly co-located Youth Centre took place on 30 October 2010.

=== Clyde Township Library Lounge ===
Opening on 14 February 2026, this branch is the newest addition to the Connected Libraries service. It is located within the Clyde Township Community Centre.

== See also ==
- Libraries in Melbourne
