= Junction Village =

- Town
- Interactive map of Junction Village
- Coordinates: 38.132°S 145.293°E
- Country: Australia
- State: Victoria
- LGA: City of Casey
- Location: 45 km (28 mi) from Melbourne; 4 km (2.5 mi) from Cranbourne

Government
  - State electorate: Cranbourne
  - Federal division: Holt

Area
  - Total: 0.8 km^{2} (0.31 sq mi)

Population
  - Total: 1,051 (2021 census)
  - Density: 1,310/km^{2} (3,400/sq mi)
- Postcode: 3977
Localities around Junction Village
Cranbourne	Cranbourne	Cranbourne East
Cranbourne South	Junction Village	Cranbourne East
Cranbourne South	Devon Meadows	Devon Meadows

Junction Village is a suburb in Melbourne, Victoria, Australia, 45 km south-east of Melbourne's Central Business District, located within the City of Casey local government area. Junction Village recorded a population of 1,051 at the 2021 census.

Junction Village has a small row of shops and a sports oval.

== Transportation ==
Cranbourne Transit operates Route 796 to Cranbourne via Clyde, with additional Route 795 services to Warneet on weekdays.

== See also ==
- City of Cranbourne – Junction Village was previously within this former local government area.
