= Division of Holt =

Australian federal electoral division

Coordinates: 38.044°S 145.281°E

Holt Australian House of Representatives Division
- Interactive map of electorate boundaries from the 2025 federal election
- Created: 1969
- MP: Cassandra Fernando
- Party: Labor
- Namesake: Harold Holt
- Electors: 112,992 (2025)
- Area: 252 km^{2} (97.3 sq mi)
- Demographic: Outer metropolitan
Electorates around Holt:
Isaacs	Bruce	La Trobe
Dunkley	Holt	La Trobe
Flinders	Western Port	Western Port

The Division of Holt is an Australian Electoral Division in Victoria.

As of 2025, the division is located in outer south-east Melbourne and covers the southern half of City of Casey. It includes the suburbs of Blind Bight, Botanic Ridge, Cannons Creek, Clyde, Cranbourne, Cranbourne East, Cranbourne South, Cranbourne West, Devon Meadows, Hampton Park, Junction Village, Lynbrook, and Warneet; and parts of Clyde North, Cranbourne North, Lyndhurst, Narre Warren South, Pearcedale and Tooradin.

Since 2022, the division is represented by Cassandra Fernando of the Labor Party.

== Geography ==
Since 1984, federal electoral division boundaries in Australia have been determined at redistributions by a redistribution committee appointed by the Australian Electoral Commission. Redistributions occur for the boundaries of divisions in a particular state, and they occur every seven years, or sooner if a state's representation entitlement changes or when divisions of a state are malapportioned.

When the division was created in 1968, it covered the areas of City of Springvale, City of Dandenong, the western portion of Shire of Berwick (later split off to become City of Berwick) and the northern portion of Shire of Cranbourne local government areas. It also covered small parts of the eastern portion of Shire of Berwick (later Shire of Pakenham) and the City of Frankston. It included the major suburbs of Springvale, Keysborough, Dandenong, Cranbourne and Berwick, and came short of the towns of Emerald and Cockatoo.

In 1977, it was expanded south to meet Western Port, covering majority of the City of Cranbourne. It gained places from the Division of Flinders such as Langwarrin, Cranbourne South, Pearcedale, Tooradin and the western half of Koo Wee Rup, but losing Springvale and Springvale South. This expansion was reversed in 1983, along with the loss of many areas in its north east to the Division of La Trobe, including areas in the Shire of Pakenham and majority of City of Berwick. In 1989, it shifted into the north east again, regaining some areas in City of Berwick. It lost most areas south of the Princes Highway or the Pakenham railway line (except a portion of Narre Warren South) to form the new Division of Corinella. It also regained a portion of Springvale north of the railway line.

In 1994, Corinella was abolished, and the division expanded south and regained areas south of the Princes Highway or the Pakenham railway line, such as Keysborough and Hampton Park. In 2003, the division was shited south-east to regain Cranbourne, Cranbourne West and Cranbourne East, losing Dandenong and Keysborough. In 2010, it had a minor boundary change, losing a block of Narre Warren South. In 2018, it was shifted further southwards to meet Western Port again. It regained places such as Cranbourne South, Pearcedale and Tooradin (which were lost in 1983) from the Division of Flinders. At the north, it lost areas north of the Pakenham railway line such as Hallam, Endeavour Hills and Doveton to the Division of Bruce. In 2024, it had another minor boundary change, losing a block of Cranbourne North.

As of the 2024 redistribution, the division covers the southern half of City of Casey, sharing boundaries with the local government area along the west (Western Port Highway), the south (coast of Western Port) and the east.

== History ==
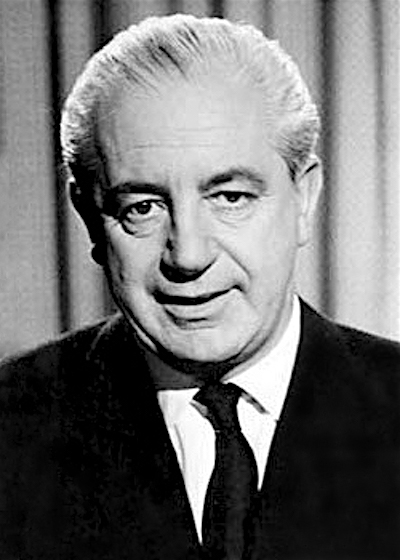
Harold Holt, the division's namesake

The division was created in the 1969 redistribution, and is named after former Prime Minister Harold Holt. Holt was a long-serving minister under successive governments led by Robert Menzies. Holt became Prime Minister upon Menzies' retirement in January 1966, although Holt would only serve less than two years before his disappearance off Cheviot Beach in December 1967.

Historically a marginal seat, over time the seat became safer for the Australian Labor Party. However, after the 2004 election it was again highly marginal due to voter backlash over the announcement that the proposed Scoresby Freeway would be a tollway rather than a freeway. The seat returned to its safe status following the 2007 election.

Its most prominent members include Michael Duffy and Gareth Evans. Both served as ministers under Bob Hawke and Paul Keating, though Evans was a Senator during that period. Evans also served as deputy under Kim Beazley from 1996 to 1998.

== Members ==
Image	Member	Party	Term	Notes
	Len Reid (1916–2003)	Liberal	25 October 1969 – 2 December 1972	Previously held the Victorian Legislative Assembly seat of Dandenong. Lost seat
	Max Oldmeadow (1924–2013)	Labor	2 December 1972 – 13 December 1975	Lost seat
	William Yates (1921–2010)	Liberal	13 December 1975 – 18 October 1980	Previously held the British House of Commons seat of The Wrekin. Lost seat
	Michael Duffy (1938–)	Labor	18 October 1980 – 29 January 1996	Served as minister under Hawke and Keating. Retired
	Gareth Evans (1944–)	Labor	2 March 1996 – 30 September 1999	Previously a member of the Senate. Resigned to retire from politics
	Anthony Byrne (1962–)	Labor	6 November 1999 – 11 April 2022	Retired
	Cassandra Fernando (1987–)	Labor	21 May 2022 – present	Incumbent

== Election results ==
2025 Australian federal election: Holt
Party	Candidate	Votes	%	±%
Labor	Cassandra Fernando	44,686	45.03	+4.22
Liberal	Annette Samuel	24,840	25.03	−4.51
Greens	Payal Tiwari	11,122	11.21	+2.66
One Nation	Trevor Hammond	8,655	8.72	+3.85
Family First	Shane Foreman	5,185	5.23	+5.23
Legalise Cannabis	Riley Aickin	4,745	4.78	+4.78
Total formal votes		99,233	96.20	+2.76
Informal votes		3,923	3.80	−2.76
Turnout		103,156	91.33	+9.49
Two-party-preferred result
Labor	Cassandra Fernando	63,538	64.03	+6.92
Liberal	Annette Samuel	35,695	35.97	−6.92
Labor hold		Swing	+6.92	
