= Cranbourne North =

- Suburb
- Interactive map of Cranbourne North
- Coordinates: 38.07°S 145.291°E
- Country: Australia
- State: Victoria
- City: Melbourne
- LGA: City of Casey
- Location: 39 km (24 mi) from Melbourne; 4 km (2.5 mi) from Cranbourne

Government
  - State electorate: Narre Warren South
  - Federal divisions: Bruce; Holt

Area
  - Total: 5.6 km^{2} (2.2 sq mi)

Population
  - Total: 24,683 (2021 census)
  - Density: 4,410/km^{2} (11,420/sq mi)
- Postcode: 3977
Suburbs around Cranbourne North
Hampton Park	Narre Warren South	Berwick
Lynbrook	Cranbourne North	Clyde North
Cranbourne West	Cranbourne	Cranbourne East

Cranbourne North is a suburb in Melbourne, Victoria, Australia, 39 km south-east of Melbourne's Central Business District, located within the City of Casey local government area. Cranbourne North recorded a population of 24,683 at the 2021 census.

The Camden Green Estate is one of the largest developments in the suburb. Formerly a market garden, construction commenced in 2003. It is alongside Narre Warren–Cranbourne Road.

More recently construction has commenced on the opposite side of Narre Warren–Cranbourne Road on further subdivisions. These include the 'Sierra', 'Eve' and 'The Avenue at Casey' estates. The latter skirts the Melbourne Urban Growth Boundary.

== Education ==
Cranbourne North has two secondary schools, Lyndhurst Secondary College, and Alkira Secondary College, previously known as Casey Central College, and three primary schools; St Therese's Primary School (a Catholic Primary School), Courtenay Gardens Primary School, and Tulliallan Primary School.

== Shopping ==
Thompson Parkway Shopping Centre is located on the corner of Thompsons Road and South Gippsland Highway. It was opened in March 1994, and contains a Woolworths supermarket, Priceline Pharmacy, Supercheap Auto, Rivers, Daniel's Donuts and a number of other specialty shops. Cranbourne North Post Office opened here on 21 March 1994.

The Cranbourne Homemaker Centre is located just outside the formal boundary of the suburb, which includes many national stores.

== Transport ==
Merinda Park railway station is located within the suburb's boundaries. The station is located on the Cranbourne railway line. Merinda Park Railway Station was opened in March 1995, upon completion of the electrification of the line between South Gippsland Highway and the junction with the Pakenham railway line at Dandenong South.

Cranbourne Transit operates the 799, 881 and 893, and Ventura the 841, 847, 899 and 981 bus routes via Cranbourne North.

== Sport ==
The Cranbourne Golf Club is located off Glasscocks Road, near the exit off the South Gippsland Highway.

== See also ==
- City of Cranbourne – Cranbourne North was previously within this former local government area.
