= Devon Meadows =

- Town
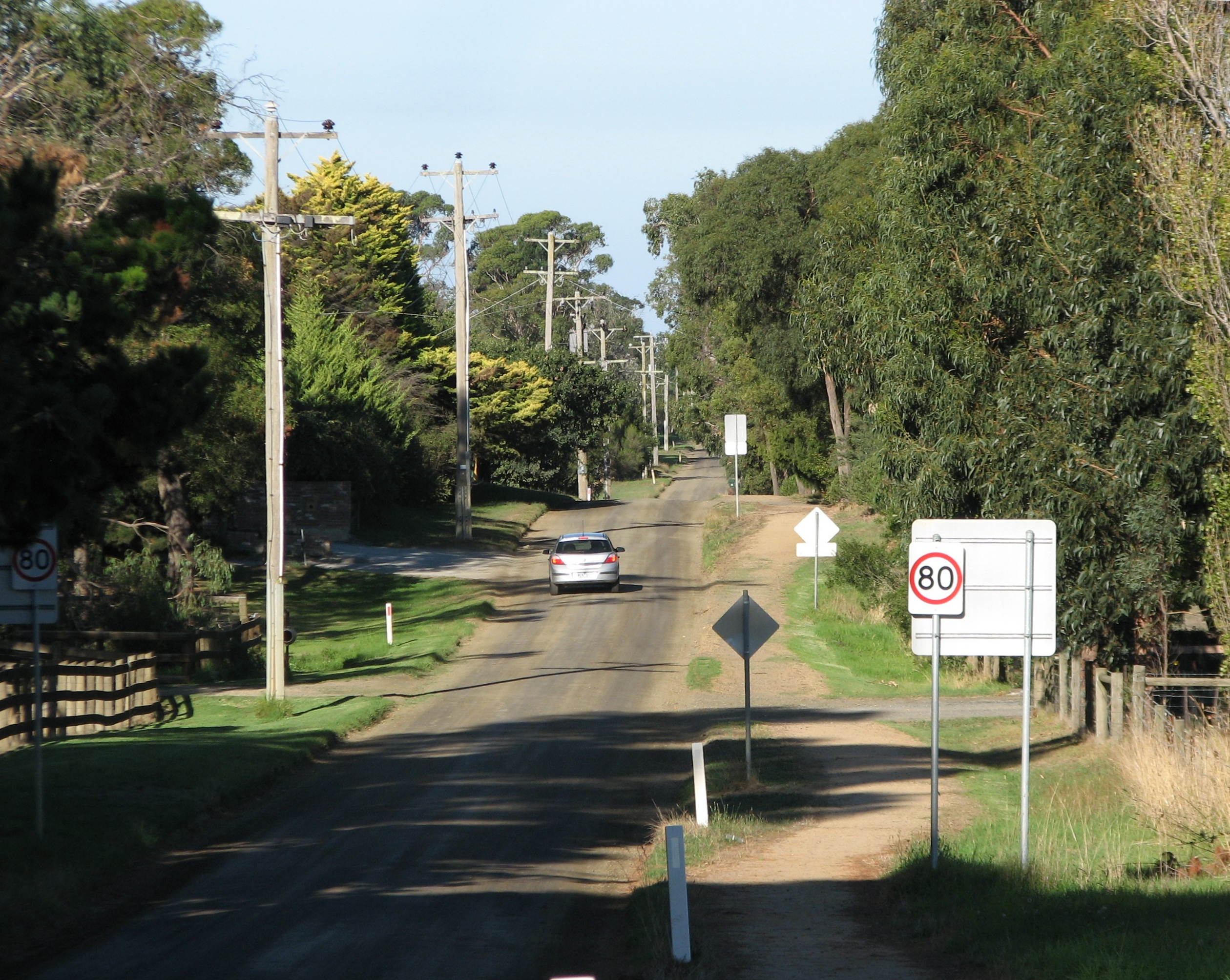
- Worthing Road

- Interactive map of Devon Meadows
- Coordinates: 38.162°S 145.303°E
- Country: Australia
- State: Victoria
- LGA: City of Casey
- Location: 50 km (31 mi) from Melbourne; 8 km (5.0 mi) from Cranbourne

Government
  - State electorate: Bass
  - Federal division: Holt

Population
  - Total: 1,551 (2021 census)
- Postcode: 3977
Localities around Devon Meadows
Junction Village	Cranbourne East	Clyde
Cranbourne South	Devon Meadows	Clyde
Pearcedale	Cannons Creek	Tooradin

Devon Meadows is a town in Victoria, Australia, 50 km south-east of Melbourne's Central Business District, located within the City of Casey local government area. Devon Meadows recorded a population of 1,551 at the 2021 census.

Devon Meadows Post Office was located at 89 Finsbury Road and opened on 21 March 1915, and closed in 1941.The original building was one of the oldest buildings in Devon Meadows. It became a residential home and was known as being haunted, but burnt down around 1984. The oldest home was owned by the Rawlins family in Worthing Road.

Devon Meadows contains a primary school with a current enrolment of about 300, a CFA fire station, community hall, and tennis club.

Just east of the main township is a locality known Five Ways after the split intersection where three roads leave the South Gippsland Highway: Clyde-Five Ways Road, bound for Berwick, Fisheries Road, bound for Cannons Creek, and one of either Finsbury, Manks or Browns Roads, the latter two of which are bound for Koo Wee Rup and Langwarrin respectively. A general store at the intersection provides services to travelers.

The town has an Australian Rules football team (the Devon Meadows Panthers) competing in the Mornington Peninsula Nepean Football League, and a cricket team also known as the Panthers that competes in the District Division of the West Gippsland Cricket Association.

== Transport ==
- 795 Cranbourne – Warneet (Monday to Friday). Operated by Cranbourne Transit.
- 796 Cranbourne – Clyde (Monday to Friday). Operated by Cranbourne Transit.
