= City of Cranbourne =

Coordinates: 38°06′18″S 145°16′44″E

- Local government area
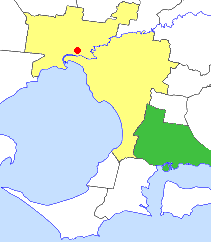
- Location in Melbourne

- The City of Cranbourne as at its dissolution in 1994
- Country: Australia
- State: Victoria
- Region: Outer Southeast Melbourne
- Established: 1860
- Council seat: Cranbourne

Area
  - Total: 755 km^{2} (292 sq mi)

Population
  - Total: 82,700 (1993)
  - Density: 109.54/km^{2} (283.7/sq mi)
- County: Mornington
LGAs around City of Cranbourne
Dandenong	Berwick	Pakenham
Springvale; Frankston	City of Cranbourne	Pakenham
Hastings	Western Port	Korumburra

The City of Cranbourne was a local government area about 45 kilometres (28 mi) southeast of Melbourne, the state capital of Victoria, Australia. The city covered an area of 755 square kilometres (291.5 sq mi), and existed from 1860 until 1994. It was notable for being the last local government area to be declared a city prior to the large-scale amalgamations of 1994 – its former designation was the Shire of Cranbourne.

== History ==
The Cranbourne Road District was first incorporated on 19 June 1860, and became a shire on 6 March 1868. On 27 January 1893, it annexed part of the Shire of Buln Buln, around the areas of Koo Wee Rup and Lang Lang, while on 6 May 1919, it lost some of its territory to the Shires of Frankston and Hastings. From the 1950s onwards, industrial development started to spread southwards from Dandenong, and by the 1980s, Cranbourne was part of Melbourne's southeastern growth corridor and had essentially become a dormitory suburb of Dandenong and Melbourne. However, eastern parts of the shire were still rural in character, with dairying, market gardening, potato growing and animal breeding being primary pursuits.

On 22 April 1994, Cranbourne was proclaimed a city by the Governor of Victoria, Richard McGarvie. However, less than eight months later, on 15 December 1994, the City of Cranbourne was abolished, and split into six portions of varying sizes. The largest sections were given to the City of Casey, which received Cranbourne itself, as well as Hampton Park and the rural/semi-rural areas of Devon Meadows, Clyde and a number of coastal villages, including Tooradin. The City of Frankston received Langwarrin, Carrum Downs and Skye, with other smaller transfers included:

- Dandenong South and parts of Lyndhurst to the City of Greater Dandenong;
- Koo Wee Rup and Lang Lang to the Shire of Cardinia and Bass Coast Shire;
- Part of Pearcedale to the Shire of Mornington Peninsula.

An article in The Age in July 1994 reported that Cranbourne was "losing the fight to remain separate". During the submission process, the council had wanted to remain as is with no merger or loss of territory, as it was fast-growing and needed its entire rate base. In its final year of existence, Cranbourne was one of the five fastest growing municipalities in Australia, in marked contrast to most of the rest of the state.

Council met at Shire Offices in Sladen Street, Cranbourne, which were a purpose-built facility opening in 1978. The building was sold by Casey City Council in 1995, and is now used as a health care facility, known as the 'Cranbourne Integrated Care Centre'. Prior to 1978, the Shire of Cranbourne met at the 'Old Shire Offices', which is next to the buildings built in 1978. This building is now used as a venue for council meetings by the City of Casey, as well as hosting many historical artefacts of the former shire.

== Wards ==
The Shire of Cranbourne was divided into four ridings, each of which elected three councillors. On becoming a city, the ridings became wards.

- North Riding
- East Riding
- Centre Riding
- West Riding

== Suburbs and localities ==
Outer Metropolitan:

- Botanic Ridge*
- Carrum Downs (shared with the City of Springvale and City of Frankston)
- Clyde
- Clyde North
- Cranbourne+
- Cranbourne East*
- Cranbourne North
- Cranbourne South
- Cranbourne West*
- Dandenong South (shared with the City of Dandenong)
- Devon Meadows
- Hampton Park
- Junction Village
- Langwarrin
- Lynbrook*
- Lyndhurst
- Sandhurst*
- Skye

* Suburbs gazetted since the amalgamation.
+ Council seat.

Rural:

- Baxter (shared with the City of Frankston and Shire of Hastings)
- Bayles
- Blind Bight
- Caldermeade
- Cannons Creek
- Cardinia
- Catani
- Dalmore
- Heath Hill
- Koo Wee Rup
- Lang Lang
- Monomeith
- Pearcedale (shared with the City of Frankston and Shire of Hastings)
- Tooradin
- Warneet
- Yannathan

== Population ==
Year	Population
1954	8,201
1958	9,160*
1961	10,908
1966	13,089
1971	16,266
1976	24,968
1981	34,821
1986	47,619
1991	70,821
1992	78,100

* Estimate in the 1958 Victorian Year Book.
