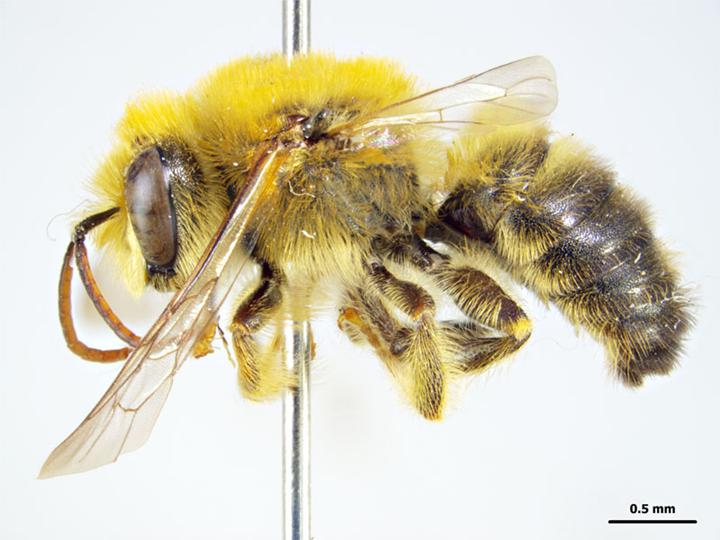
- Female

Scientific classification
- Kingdom: Animalia
- Phylum: Arthropoda
- Clade: Pancrustacea
- Class: Insecta
- Order: Hymenoptera
- Family: Colletidae
- Genus: Leioproctus
- Species: L. subdolus

Binomial name
- Leioproctus subdolus (Cockerell, 1913)

Synonyms
- Paracolletes fervidus subdolus Cockerell, 1913; Leioproctus (Goniocolletes) dolosus Michener, 1965

= Leioproctus subdolus =

Species of bee

Leioproctus subdolus, or Leioproctus (Goniocolletes) subdolus, is a species of bee in the family Colletidae and subfamily Colletinae. It is endemic to Australia. It was described by British-American entomologist Theodore Dru Alison Cockerell in 1913.

== Description ==
Female body length is about 12 mm. Colouration is mainly black and dark red, with white to golden hair.

== Distribution and habitat ==
The species occurs in south-eastern Australia. Type localities include Tooradin and Cheltenham, Victoria.

== Behaviour ==
The adults are flying mellivores.
