= Alkira Secondary College =

Coordinates: 38°03′52″S 145°18′31″E

- Cranbourne, Victoria; Australia

Information
- Type: Public
- Established: 2009
- Principal: John Shaw
- Years: 7–12
- Enrolment: 1854
- Colours: Green, white, pink, blue and red
- Website: alkirasecondarycollege.com.au

Alkira Secondary College, formerly Casey Central Secondary College, is a public government secondary school in Cranbourne North, Victoria, Australia. It opened with Year 7 classes in 2009 and currently has a student population of 1,621 students.

== Design and planning ==
The school follows a "private-public partnership", one of only a few in the state. The secondary college has modern design and architecture in mind, including smaller learning centres within the school. The school's design model is very similar to that of the regeneration of Dandenong High School model.
