= City of Casey =

Coordinates: 38°05′24″S 145°19′23″E

- Local government area
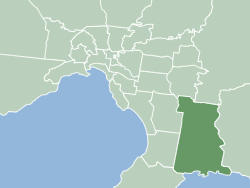
- Map of Melbourne showing City of Casey

- Interactive map of City of Casey
- Country: Australia
- State: Victoria
- Region: Greater Melbourne
- Established: 1994
- Council seat: Narre Warren

Government
  - State electorate: * Bass; Berwick; Carrum; Cranbourne; Dandenong; Narre Warren North; Narre Warren South
  - Federal division: * Bruce; Holt; La Trobe

Area
  - Total: 409 km^{2} (158 sq mi)

Population
  - Total: 365,239 (2021) (8th)
  - Density: 893.0/km^{2} (2,312.9/sq mi)
- Website: City of Casey
LGAs around City of Casey
Knox	Yarra Ranges	Cardinia
Greater Dandenong; Frankston	City of Casey	Cardinia
Mornington Peninsula	Western Port	Western Port

The City of Casey is a local government area in Victoria, Australia in the outer south-eastern suburbs of Melbourne. Casey is Victoria's most populous municipality, with a 2021 population of 365,239. It has an area of 409 square kilometres (157.9 sq mi).

The city is named after Lord Casey, the 16th Governor-General of Australia, and was formed in 1994 by the merger of most of the City of Berwick with parts of the Shire of Cranbourne (including Cranbourne itself), and the Churchill Park Drive estate within the City of Knox.

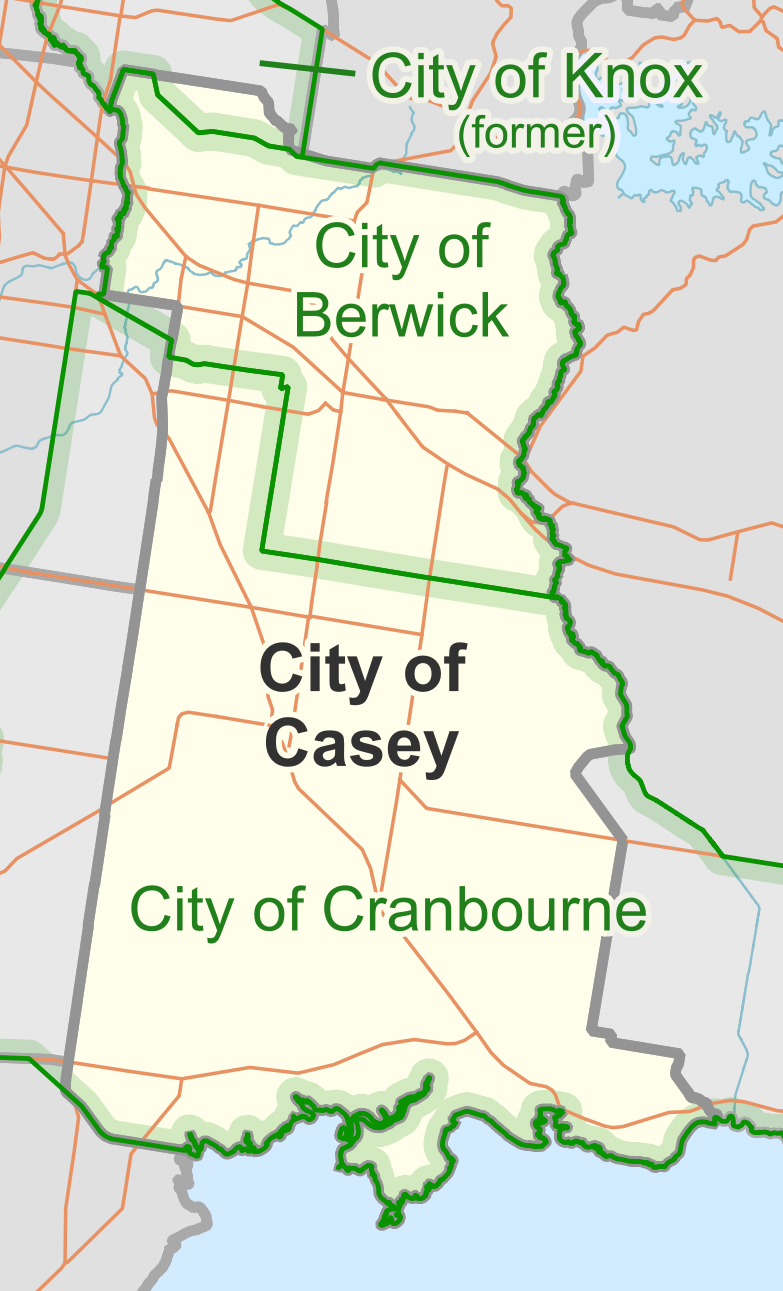
The city's predecessor LGAs (green) as they were in 1994

== Geography ==
Casey spreads from the base of the Dandenong Ranges in the north to the shoreline of Western Port in the south. It features a wide variety of geographical features, due to its outer metropolitan location.

The north, in the foothills of the Dandenongs, is primarily made up of large blocks of land used for grazing, with some small vineyards in operation. An Urban Growth Boundary has been in place since 2005 to protect this area from future residential subdivision.

South of Cranbourne is mainly farmland, used for market gardening and grazing. A small number of flower farms exist around Junction Village, along with a large chicken processing plant in Clyde. This green area has now been opened up for housing development, in the areas of Cranbourne East, Clyde and Clyde North.

The southern boundary of the municipality is the Western Port shoreline including the fishing villages of Tooradin, Blind Bight, Warneet and Cannons Creek. Protected marine reserves exist along this coastline and extend into the Mornington Peninsula at Pearcedale.

The Cardinia border of the city is formed for some of the boundary by the Cardinia Creek, which is drained through channels into Western Port at its southern end. The popular Riding of the Bounds event takes place along this border, in recognition of Berwick's sister city status with Berwick-upon-Tweed in Northumberland, England.

== Council ==
Until 2024, the City of Casey was divided into six wards – Balla Balla, Edrington, Four Oaks, Mayfield, River Gum and Springfield. Voters in Balla Balla Ward elected one councillor and all other wards electing two councillors per ward. The eleven councillors voted each year to elect a mayor.

In February 2020, the Victorian Minister for Local Government, Adem Somyurek, dismissed all Casey councillors following a report from municipal monitor Laurinda Gardner that found significant governance failures at the council. Somyurek then appointed Noelene Duff as interim administrator.

In May 2020 Somyurek appointed Noelene Duff PSM, Cameron Boardman and Miguel Belmar as Council administrator panel, to remain until October 2024.

=== Current composition ===
2024 ward boundaries. Expand the map and click on a ward to see the ward name.

The most recent elections were held on 26 October 2024 and elected the following councillors:

Ward	Named after	Councillor	Party
Akoonah	Akoonah Park, Berwick	Scott Dowling	Ind. Citizens
Casuarina	Casuarina (she-oak) trees	Kim Ross	Independent
Correa	Correa plants	Gary Rowe	Independent
Cranbourne Gardens	Royal Botanic Gardens, Cranbourne	Michelle Crowther	Independent
Dillwynia	Dillwynia plants	Anthony Walter	Independent
Grevillea	Grevillea plants	Dave Perry	Greens
Kalora	Kalora Park, Narre Warren North	Melinda Ambros	Independent
Kowan	Kowan Recreation Reserve, Cranbourne North (in turn named for the Bunurong word for "echidna")	Shane Taylor	Independent
Quarters	Quarters Primary School, Cranbourne West	Carolyn Eaves	Independent
River Gum	River Gum Creek Reserve, Hampton Park	Lynette Pereira	Independent
Tooradin	The locality of Tooradin	Jennifer Dizon	Independent
Waratah	Waratah Reserve, Eumemmerring	Stefan Koomen	Ind. Labor

== Election results ==
=== 2024 ===
2024 Victorian local elections: Casey
Party	Votes	%	Seats	Change
Independent	134,110	69.62	10	▲10
Independent Labor	31,798	16.51	1	▲1
Independent Liberal	12,082	6.27	0	Steady
Independent Freedom	4,623	2.40	0	Steady
Libertarian	3,109	1.61	0	Steady
Independent Libertarian	2,575	1.34	0	Steady
Greens	2,451	1.27	1	▲1
Independent Family First	1,893	0.98	0	Steady
Formal votes	192,641	95.93		
Informal votes	8,169	4.07		
Total	200,810	100.00	12	▲1
Registered voters / turnout	246,948	81.32		

== Places of interest ==
- Akoonah Park
- Casey Insight Education Centre for the Blind and Vision Impaired
- Casey RACE – Recreation & Aquatic Centre
- Casey Aquatic and Recreation Centre (ARC)
- Casey Cardinia Libraries
- Cranbourne Community Theatre
- Casey Fields
- Westfield Fountain Gate
- Lysterfield Lake Park
- Federation University, Berwick Campus
- Moonlit Sanctuary Wildlife Conservation Park
- Myuna Farm
- Royal Botanic Gardens, Cranbourne
- The Factory – Rehearsal Centre for the Arts (Cranbourne)
- The Shed (indoor skate park)
- Wilson Botanic Park

== Townships and localities ==
The 2021 census, the city had a population of 365,239 up from 299,301 in the 2016 census

Population
Locality	2016	2021
Beaconsfield^	6,714	7,267
Berwick	47,674	50,298
Blind Bight	1,251	1,290
Botanic Ridge	3,919	6,739
Cannons Creek	647	650
Clyde	2,117	11,177
Clyde North	8,156	31,681
Cranbourne	20,094	21,281
Cranbourne East	16,195	24,679
Cranbourne North	20,110	24,683
Cranbourne South	1,674	3,241
Cranbourne West	15,035	19,969
Devon Meadows	1,548	1,551
Doveton	9,358	9,603
Endeavour Hills	24,294	24,455
Eumemmerring	1,948	2,285
Hallam	10,852	11,355
Hampton Park	25,530	26,082
Harkaway	849	1,011
Junction Village	1,017	1,051
Lynbrook	8,519	9,121
Lyndhurst^	6,725	8,926
Lysterfield South	957	994
Narre Warren	26,621	27,689
Narre Warren North	7,674	8,033
Narre Warren South	30,319	30,909
Pearcedale^	3,821	3,867
Tooradin^	1,568	1,722
Warneet	536	565

^ - Territory divided with another LGA

== Sport ==
The Melbourne City Football Club is based in the City of Casey.

The Casey Demons (formerly Scorpions), an Australian rules football club represents Casey in the Victorian Football League. Their home ground is at the Casey Fields Complex in Cranbourne. The team was founded in around 1903 in Springvale. The club relocated to Casey Fields and later developed a relationship with the Melbourne Football Club has developed a partnership with the City of Casey, with training sessions and other events held at Casey Fields.

The Casey-South Melbourne Cricket Club also have their home ground at Casey Fields.

The Casey Warriors play rugby league in NRL Victoria.

The Casey Cavaliers are the representative basketball club of the City of Casey. They compete in the NBL1, Big V and VJBL competitions. The Casey Basketball Association oversees all affiliated basketball within the City of Casey and has over 8,000 weekly participants.

== Media ==
Community Radio – 97.7 FM 3SER

== Friendship and sister city relationships ==
The City of Casey is twinned with

- Berwick-upon-Tweed, England, (sister city since 1982)
- Springfield, Ohio, United States (sister city since 1985)
- (Timor-Leste) Ermera, East Timor (friendship link since 2004)

In 1998 the City of Casey established a friendship link (also known as a twin town) with Ioannina, Greece, which lapsed in 2008.

== See also ==
- List of places on the Victorian Heritage Register in the City of Casey
- Mornington Peninsula and Western Port Biosphere Reserve
