= Narre Warren =

- Suburb
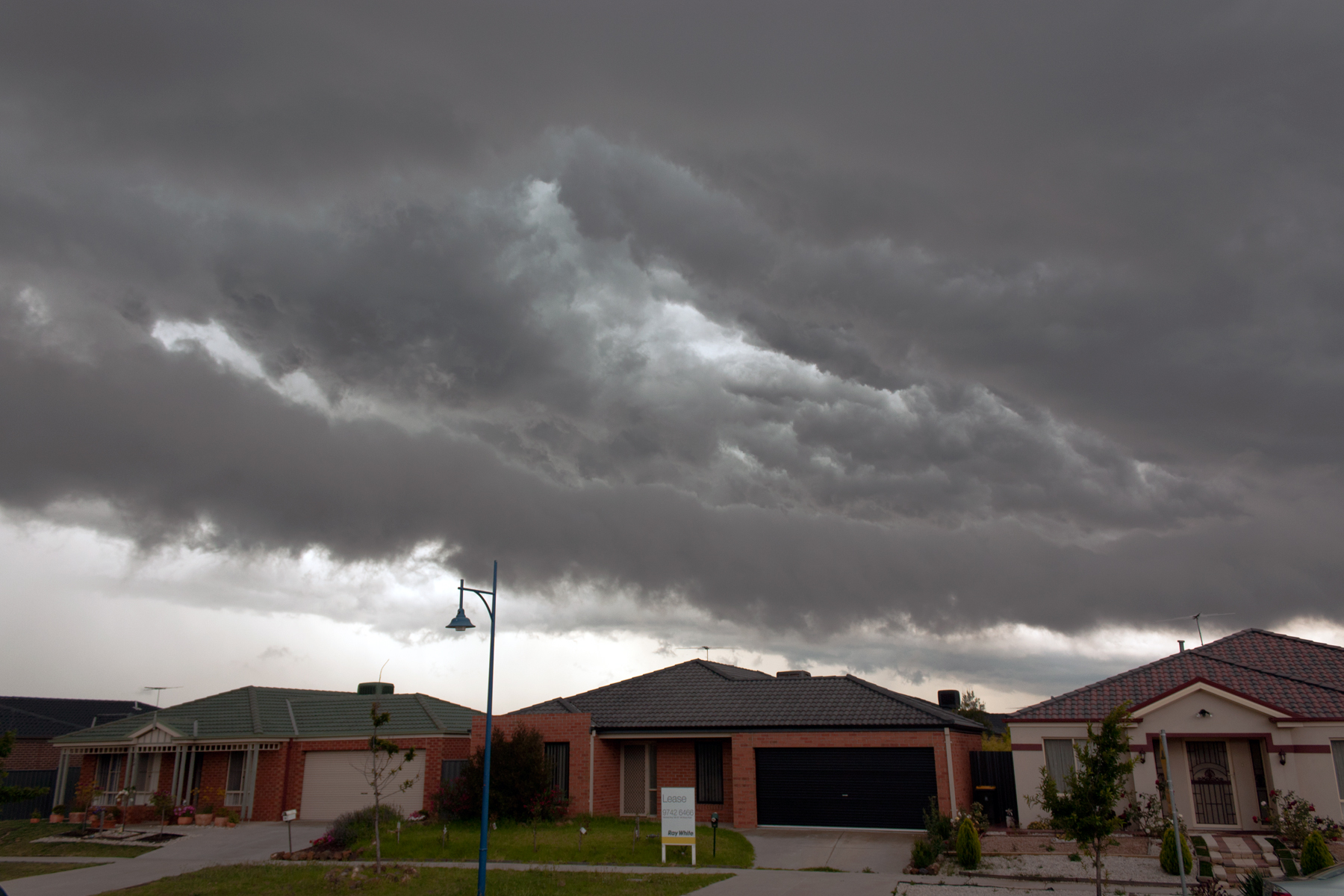
- Summer storms over Narre Warren residences

- Interactive map of Narre Warren
- Coordinates: 38.018°S 145.3°E
- Country: Australia
- State: Victoria
- City: Melbourne
- LGA: City of Casey
- Location: 38 km (24 mi) from Melbourne; 11 km (6.8 mi) from Dandenong

Government
  - State electorate: Narre Warren North
  - Federal division: Bruce
- Elevation: 24 m (79 ft)

Population
  - Total: 27,689 (2021 census)
- Postcode: 3805
Suburbs around Narre Warren
Endeavour Hills	Narre Warren North	Harkaway
Hallam	Narre Warren	Berwick
Hampton Park	Narre Warren South	Clyde

Narre Warren (/ˌnæri ˈwɒrən/ NARR-ee WORR-ən) is a suburb in Melbourne, Victoria, Australia, 38 kilometres (24 mi) southeast of Melbourne's Central Business District. It is the council seat of the City of Casey local government area. Narre Warren recorded a population of 27,689 at the 2021 census.

Narre Warren has a population density of over 2000 people per square kilometre. Narre Warren has its own railway station, located on Webb Street, and has its own shopping centre, Westfield Fountain Gate, Australia's and Oceania's second largest shopping centre by area after Malvern East's Chadstone Shopping Centre. The biggest secondary school in Narre Warren is Fountain Gate Secondary College.

== History ==
The original Main Street is some distance from present-day central Narre Warren, beside the railway line, causing development to occur away from the original settlement, and the building in which the general store also served as the post office, still exists as a local landmark, established 1857. Narre Warren Post Office, located on what is now Heatherton Road, opened on 21 January 1869. In 1900, it was renamed Narre Warren North, and Narre Warren Railway Station Post Office (open since 1886) was renamed Narre Warren. The locale of Webb Street is named after Sydney James Webb, founder of a newsagency there.

== Demographics ==
The most common ancestries in Narre Warren were Australian 21.9%, English 20.6%, Irish 5.1%, Scottish 5.1% and Indian 3.6%. 62.7% of people were born in Australia. The most common foreign countries of birth were India 3.6%, England 3.2%, Sri Lanka 2.7%, Afghanistan 1.9% and New Zealand 1.9%. The most common responses for religion were Catholic 28.8%, No Religion 19.6%, Anglican 10.9%, Islam 5.6% and Buddhism 3.9%. 66.7% of people spoke only English at home. Other languages spoken at home included Dari 10%, Sinhalese 1.9%, Arabic 1.5%, Spanish 1.4% and Hindi 1.3%.

== Political Affairs ==
Since 1955, the suburb is completely within the Division of Bruce electorate. The Bruce electorate seat has been held by Australian Labor Party (ALP) since 1996. The current MP is Julian Hill, and has been since 2016.

The local government for the area from 1862 to 1973, was the Shire of Pakenham. Coinciding the inception of Shire of Berwick, the area switched local governments to under its control, up until the creation of the City of Casey in 1994. Narre Warren holds the council seat, at its Bunjil Place precinct.

== Residential development ==
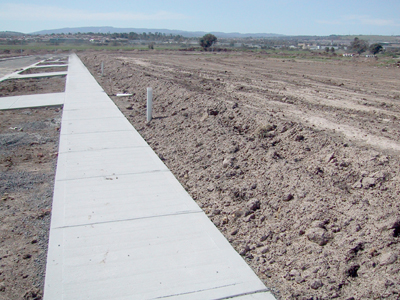
A Narre Warren street before the construction of houses – 2001

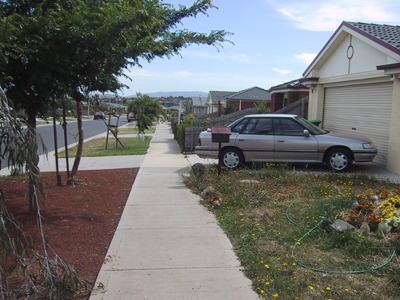
The same Narre Warren street after the construction of houses – 2006

Over the years, Narre Warren has grown from a semi-rural residential town to become a part of a major growth corridor in the southeast of Melbourne.

In recent years, a multitude of new housing developments have seen Narre Warren expand to such an extent that it now adjoins neighbouring suburbs such as Berwick.

== Education ==
Schools in Narre Warren include Harkaway Hills College, Lysterfield Lake College, Narre Warren North Primary School, Oatlands Primary School, Maramba Primary School, Don Bosco Primary School, Mary Mackillop Primary School, Fountain Gate Secondary College, Alkira Secondary College, Fountain Gate Primary School, Dandenong Valley Special School and Fleetwood Primary School (formerly known as Hallam Valley Primary School), Narre Warren South P-12 College and Waverley Christian College – Narre Warren South Campus. Narre Warren Station Primary School was closed at the end of 2001 and moved to Narre Warren South (to suit the change in growth areas) where it became Hillsmeade Primary School. There is also a large community education centre, Narre Community Learning Centre Inc., located on Malcolm Court.

== Community & recreational facilities ==
Narre Warren features some recreational facilities such as lawn bowl, bowling, cinemas, and clubs.

Kim Cang Temple, a Vietnamese Buddhist temple, is located in the suburb.

== Sport ==
The Narre Warren Football Club plays in the Southern Football Netball League. It was formed in 1953 as Narre Hallam Football Club to serve Narre Warren and Hallam, and was a founding member of the South West Gippsland Football League in 1954. The club won premierships in 1957 and 1973. It was also runners-up in 1956, 1970, 1971, 1972 and 1981. In 1989, the club renamed itself the Narre Warren Football Club.

In 2004, Casey Panthers Soccer Club was founded with the home ground being located at Prospect Hill Reserve. The senior team compete in the State League 5 competition. In 2022, the Under 17 (17A) team nicknamed 'The Invincibles' won their respective South East A grade and State A grade competitions as well as the prestigious Polonia and Altona Cups, remaining undefeated throughout the season. This was the only occurrence of a quadruple in Victorian soccer history.

== Retail and civic development ==
Westfield Fountain Gate (named after one of the earlier subdivisions) is at the heart of the main commercial precinct in Narre Warren. It is one of the largest shopping centres in Australia, housing many of Australia's major retailers. The centre has been made famous by the popular Australian television show Kath & Kim, parts of which were also filmed at Westfield Southland. The largest cinema is Village Cinemas Fountain Gate, which is located on the top floor of Fountain Gate.

There is also a local shopping strip around the railway station in Webb Street. The shopping strip includes stores such as bakeries, beauticians and a small supermarket.

The civic precinct is located outside the boundary of Westfield and includes the City of Casey municipal offices, Narre Warren Library and the Casey ARC (Aquatic and Recreation Centre). The Bunjil Place civil centre was constructed in 2017, a redevelopment of $300 million by the City of Casey Council. Replacing the original wetlands precinct that once sat there.

== Transport ==
=== Road ===
Narre Warren is connected by many major roads, mainly the Monash Freeway (M1), Princes Freeway (M1), Princes Highway (Alt 1), Narre Warren-Cranbourne Road, Narre Warren North Road, and Shrives Road. The Monash Freeway's south-east end concludes in Narre Warren, where it reaches an overpass exit (exit 23) connecting it to Princes Highway and continuing on as Princes Freeway. Princes Freeway connects the suburb to the greater Highway 1.

=== Buses ===
The biggest bus interchange in Narre Warren is at the forefront of Fountain Gate Shopping Centre. Three bus operators run route services to, from or via Fountain Gate. The primary operator, Ventura, operates routes 695F (Limited Services), 697 (one Thursday afternoon service), 828, 834, 835, 838, 841, 841, 926 and 981 (Night Bus). Cranbourne Transit operates routes 891 to Lynbrook and 895 to Amberly Park, and South Coast Bus operates a once weekly service to Cowes. The 836, 841, and 891 all directly connect the shopping centre to the suburb's railway station.

=== Rail ===
Narre Warren railway station is a Zone 2 station. It receives regular electrified metro services from Metro Trains Melbourne. It is situated on the Pakenham line (the electrified portion of the now truncated Orbost line). The line connects Narre Warren to the line's terminus, East Pakenham, and also the greater metro and V/Line network via Caulfield, South Yarra, Richmond, and the City Loop. However the city-bound terminus is expected to change with the introduction of the Metro Tunnel project, instead connecting it directly to Sunbury, and the proposed Airport Rail Link.

V/Line trains pass the station but do not stop at the station. Patrons wishing to travel on the Orbost line towards Traralgon via Morwell & Moe, or the current terminus of the line, Bairnsdale via Sale, Traralgon & Warragul from Narre Warren station must ride a Metro service to either the Dandenong or Pakenham stations, where they can switch over to the V/Line service.

=== Air ===
The suburb is connected via air travel through:

- Tooradin Airport, Tooradin,
- Moorabbin Airport, Moorabbin
- Essendon Airport, Essendon Fields
- Melbourne Tullamarine Airport, Melbourne Airport (Serves international flights)

The suburb was once connected by a much closer airfield, Casey/Berwick Airfields (ICAO: YBER), which served Berwick, Narre Warren and other surrounding suburbs from 1935, until 1996, where the land was used to build Monash University's Berwick campus.

== Notable people ==
- Destanee Aiava - tennis player
- Stacey Alleaume - soprano
- Kenny Athiu - footballer
- Matthew Boyd - Australian Rules footballer
- Trent Croad - Australian Rules footballer
- Bandali Debs - serial killer
- Jason Ellery - wheelchair rugby player
- Trevor Hosea - rugby union player
- Chris Newman - Australian Rules footballer
- Winifred Piesse - politician
- Howard Richardson, Australian Rules footballer and cricketer
- Peter Scully - murderer and rapist

== See also ==
- City of Berwick – Narre Warren was previously within this former local government area.
