= Warneet =

Coordinates: 38°13′26″S 145°18′32″E

- Town
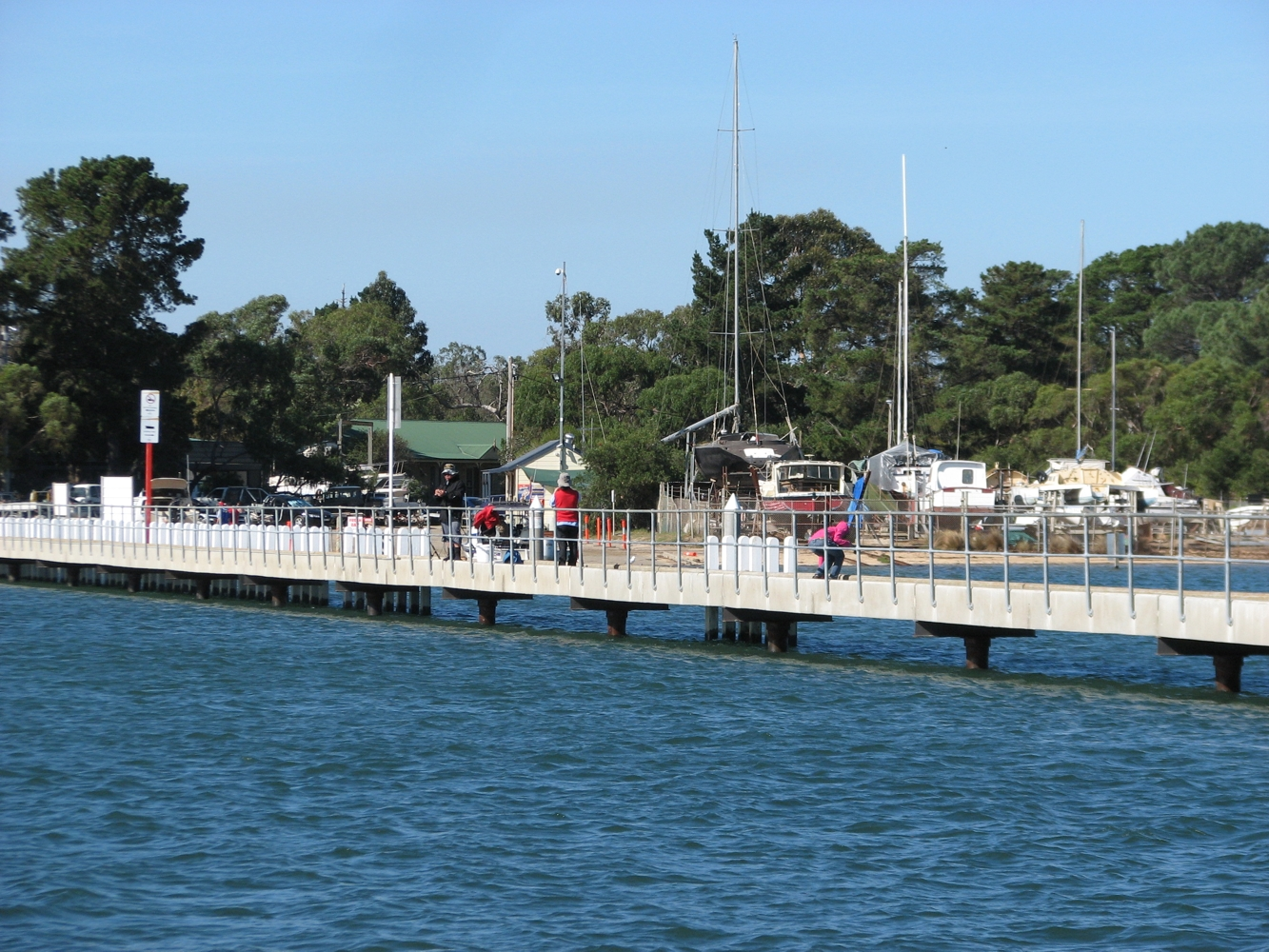
- Warneet Jetty
- Interactive map of Warneet
- Country: Australia
- State: Victoria
- LGA: City of Casey
- Location: 68 km (42 mi) from Melbourne; 19 km (12 mi) from Cranbourne
- Established: 1 July 1959

Government
  - State electorate: Bass
  - Federal division: Holt

Population
  - Total: 565 (2021 census)
- Postcode: 3980

Warneet is a town in Victoria, Australia, 68 km (42 mi) south-east of Melbourne's Central Business District, located within the City of Casey local government area. Warneet recorded a population of 565 at the 2021 census.

Warneet is located on Rutherford inlet, an arm off the North end of Western Port.

For education, most children go to Tooradin Primary School or Koo Wee Rup Secondary College.

== History ==
Warneet Post Office opened on 1 July 1959

== Transport ==
Cranbourne Transit operates route 795, which operates 5 weekday return journeys between Cranbourne and Warneet, via the nearby towns of Blind Bight, Tooradin, and Cannons Creek.

The town is also easily accessible by car via the South Gippsland Highway (M420), and Baxter-Tooradin Road (C781).

== See also ==
- City of Cranbourne – Warneet was previously within this former local government area.
