= Botanic Ridge =

- Suburb
- Interactive map of Botanic Ridge
- Coordinates: 38.144°S 145.267°E
- Country: Australia
- State: Victoria
- City: Melbourne
- LGA: City of Casey
- Location: 45 km (28 mi) from Melbourne
- Established: 2009

Government
  - State electorate: Cranbourne
  - Federal division: Holt

Population
  - Total: 6,739 (2021 census)
- Postcode: 3977
Suburbs around Botanic Ridge
Cranbourne West	Cranbourne	Junction Village
Cranbourne South	Botanic Ridge	Devon Meadows
Cranbourne South	Cranbourne South	Devon Meadows

Botanic Ridge is a suburb in Melbourne, Victoria, Australia, 45 km south-east of Melbourne's Central Business District, located within the City of Casey local government area. Botanic Ridge recorded a population of 6,739 at the 2021 census.

The suburb was created in 2009, using land that had been part of Cranbourne South until then. It is bounded in the north by Ballarto Road and the Royal Botanic Gardens, in the east by Craig Road, in the south by Browns Road and in the west by Pearcedale Road.

By 2009 the urban growth boundary had moved along Pearcedale and Browns Road, placing the western part of the suburb inside the main growth area. Two large scale housing developments, Botanic Ridge and Settlers Run Estate, have since developed in the area.

Golfers play at the course of Settlers Run Golf and Country Club at Settlers Run Estate.

== See also ==
- City of Cranbourne – Botanic Ridge was previously within this former local government area.
