= Cannons Creek, Victoria =

Cannons Creek
- Town
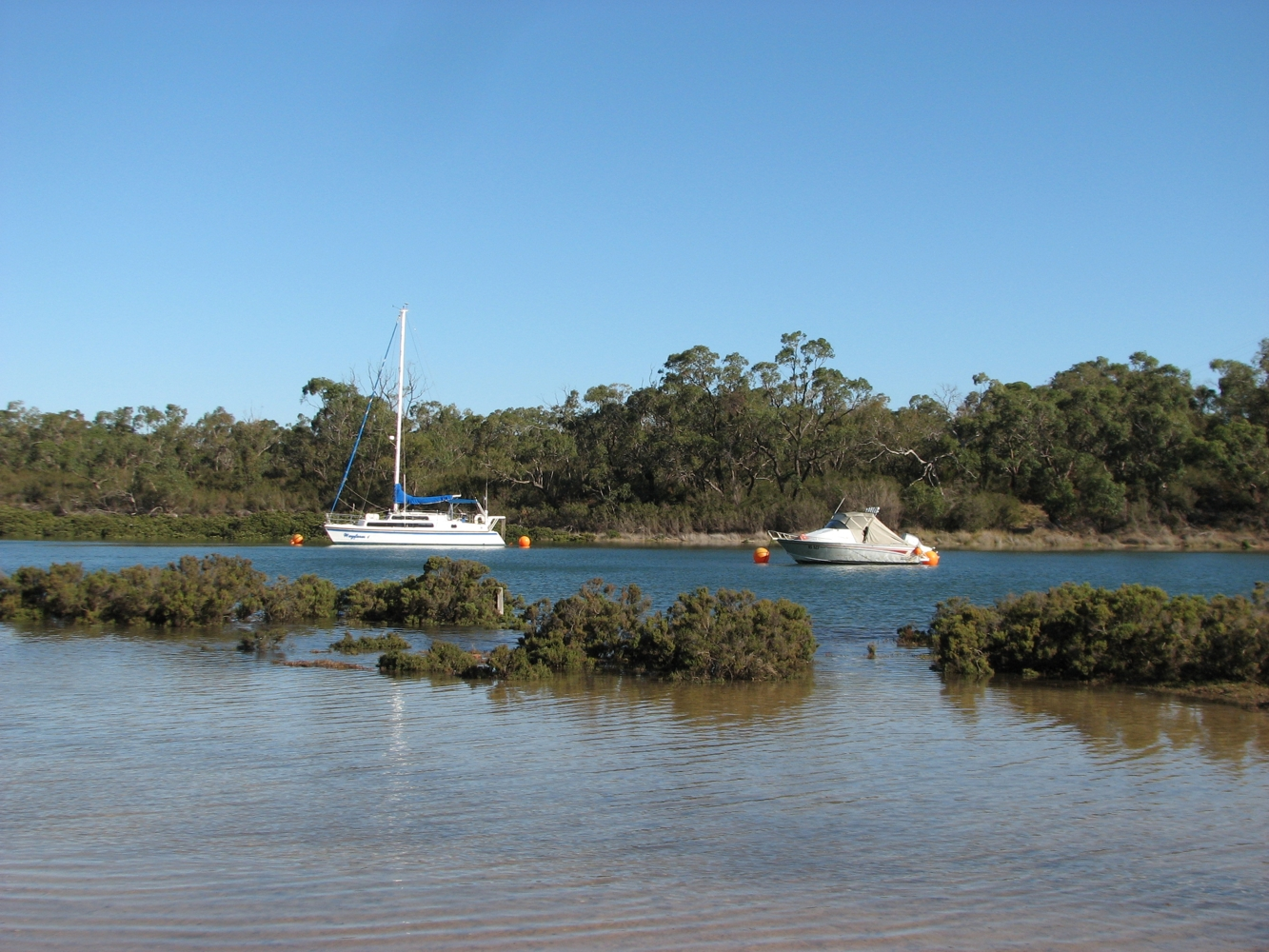

- Interactive map of Cannons Creek
- Coordinates: 38.213°S 145.315°E
- Country: Australia
- State: Victoria
- LGA: City of Casey
- Location: 54 km (34 mi) from Melbourne; 15 km (9.3 mi) from Cranbourne

Government
  - State electorate: Bass
  - Federal division: Holt

Area
  - Total: 8.2 km^{2} (3.2 sq mi)

Population
  - Total: 650 (2021 census)
  - Density: 79.3/km^{2} (205.3/sq mi)
- Postcode: 3977

Cannons Creek is a town near the top of Western Port Bay in Victoria, Australia, 54 km south-east of Melbourne's Central Business District, located within the City of Casey local government area. Cannons Creek recorded a population of 650 at the 2021 census.

The townships of both Warneet and Blind Bight are south of Cannons Creek. The community centre is located on Cannons Creek Road.

== See also ==
- City of Cranbourne – Cannons Creek was previously within this former local government area.
