= Tooradin =

- Town
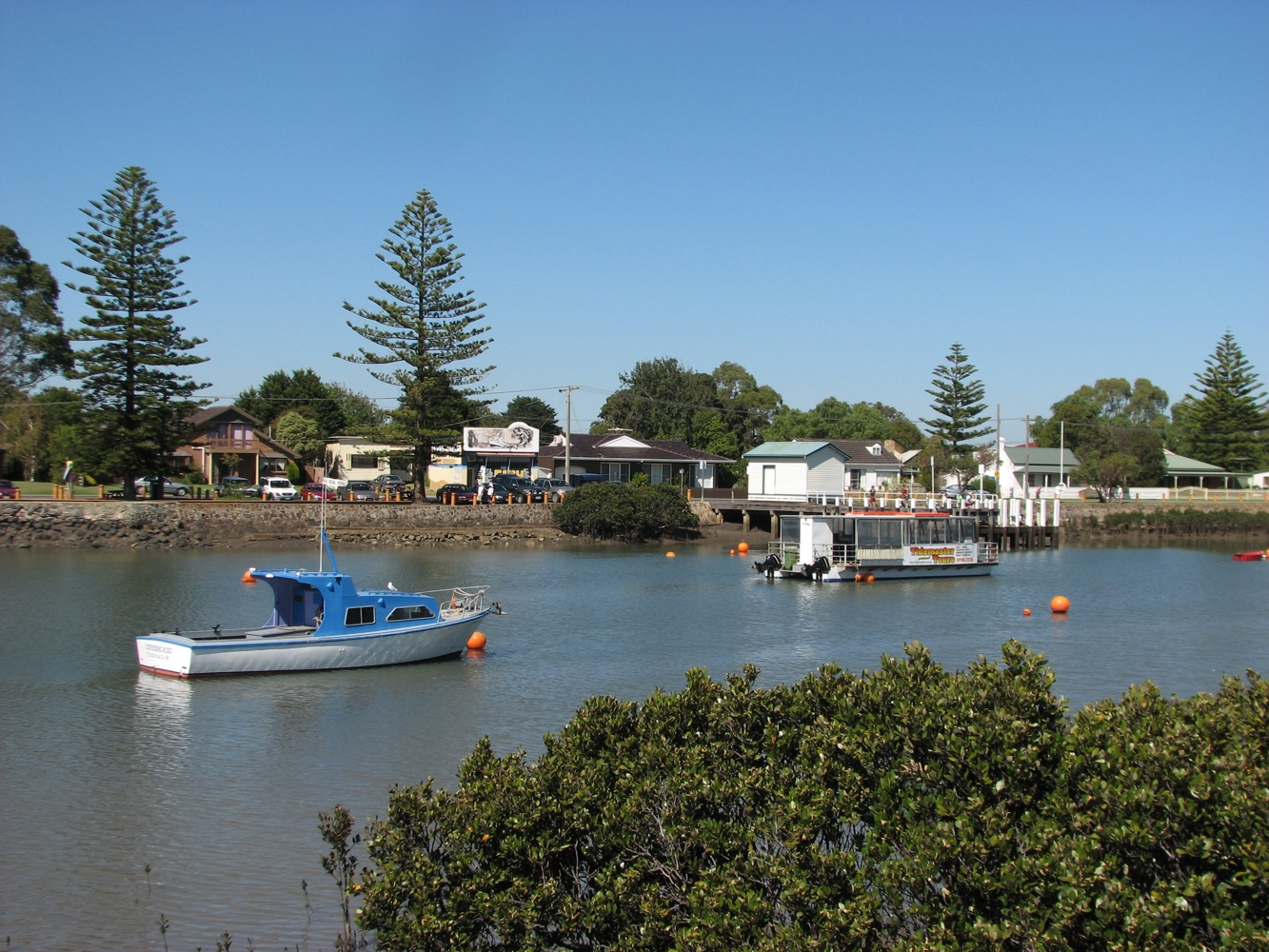
- Sawtells Inlet

- Interactive map of Tooradin
- Coordinates: 38°12′40″S 145°22′48″E
- Country: Australia
- State: Victoria
- LGAs: City of Casey; Shire of Cardinia
- Location: 57 km (35 mi) from Melbourne; 17 km (11 mi) from Cranbourne

Government
  - State electorate: Bass
  - Federal divisions: Holt; Monash

Area
  - Total: 27.3 km^{2} (10.5 sq mi)
- Elevation: 3.01 m (9.9 ft)

Population
  - Total: 1,722 (2021 census)
  - Density: 63.08/km^{2} (163.4/sq mi)
- Postcode: 3980
- Mean max temp: 19.1 °C (66.4 °F)
- Mean min temp: 7.6 °C (45.7 °F)
- Annual rainfall: 853.2 mm (33.59 in)
Localities around Tooradin
Devon Meadows	Clyde	Dalmore
Blind Bight	Tooradin	Koo Wee Rup
Warneet	Western Port	Western Port

Tooradin is a town in Victoria, Australia, 57 km south east of Melbourne's Central Business District, located within the City of Casey and the Shire of Cardinia local government areas. Tooradin recorded a population of 1,800 at the 2021 census.

== Naming ==
The name of Tooradin comes from the Boon wurrung word too-roo-dun, which refers to the Bunyip that lived in the Koo-Wee-Rup Swamp. The Dreamtime creature had a 'reputation for devouring human beings' and 'lived in the thick mud beneath the water of a waterhole that never dried up.'

== History ==
The explorer William Hovell visited the area in 1827, he saw evidence of Van Diemens Land sealers had left at their temporary camps on the foreshore of Western Port Bay. The sealers had been operating since the early 1800s.

In 1839 saw settlers with their cattle establish runs and settle in the area. Work commenced at draining swamps and improving drainage for pasture. The township was first surveyed in 1854.

Tooradin has always been a fishing village that nestled on the foreshore. The Post Office opened on 21 May 1877.

The railway passed by north of the town by 2 1/2 miles in 1885. A station was created and the fishing industry relied heavily on the railway to transport freshly caught fish to Melbourne. The railways also transported local produce, cattle, sheep and crops were raised on the land and sent to market.

=== Heritage listing ===
The following place in Tooradin is listed on the Victorian Heritage Register:

- Harewood, a homestead, 3300 South Gippsland Highway, midway between Tooradin and Koo Wee Rup

== Today ==
The town has some attractions such as Sawtell's Inlet, and an old historic weatherboard Fishermans Cottage. It is a popular stopping place for people travelling to Phillip Island.

The town in conjunction with neighbouring township Dalmore has an Australian Rules football team (Tooradin-Dalmore) competing in the West Gippsland Football Netball Competition.

== Transport ==
Tooradin railway station was formerly situated on the South Gippsland railway corridor that operated to its terminus at Yarram in the early 1980s and Leongatha in the mid-1990s. A V/Line road coach service replaced the rail service to Leongatha on 24 July 1993, running between Melbourne and Yarram. However, since the closure of the South Gippsland rail line—with the exception of the locally run tourist railway between Nyora and Leongatha (this section of line closed in 2015) by the Kennett Victorian government in 1993, the South and West Gippsland Transport Group represented by the local council had campaigned over the following two decades for the rail services to be reinstated beyond the current terminus at Cranbourne, which was promised by the Bracks government in 1999.

Cranbourne Transit operates Route 795 services on weekdays to Cranbourne via Warneet five times a day, with morning services running through Warneet prior to arriving at Tooradin. There are currently no weekend services.

=== Tooradin Airfield ===
Tooradin Airfield is a privately owned field located 4 km (2.5 miles) East of Tooradin town centre, on the South Gippsland Highway. The airfield was established in 1968.

The airfield is situated on 27 hectares (67 acres) of land and has one bitumen runway (04/22) of 950 m (3,117 ft) with lighting, one grass strip of 360 m (1,181 ft) and a 310 m (1,017 ft) gravel strip. There's a derelict freighter ship behind the runway, can be seen on the Gippsland highway, the ship is the Edwina May.

== See also ==
- City of Cranbourne – Tooradin was previously within this former local government area.
- Tooradin railway station
