= Cranbourne East =

- Suburb
- Interactive map of Cranbourne East
- Coordinates: 38.105°S 145.307°E
- Country: Australia
- State: Victoria
- City: Melbourne
- LGA: City of Casey
- Location: 46 km (29 mi) from Melbourne; 3 km (1.9 mi) from Cranbourne

Government
  - State electorate: Cranbourne
  - Federal division: Holt

Area
  - Total: 13.4 km^{2} (5.2 sq mi)

Population
  - Total: 24,679 (2021 census)
  - Density: 1,842/km^{2} (4,770/sq mi)
- Postcode: 3977
Suburbs around Cranbourne East
Cranbourne North	Cranbourne North	Clyde North
Cranbourne	Cranbourne East	Clyde North
Junction Village	Devon Meadows	Clyde

Cranbourne East is a suburb in Melbourne, Victoria, Australia, 45 km south-east of Melbourne's Central Business District, located within the City of Casey local government area. Cranbourne East recorded a population of 24,679 at the 2021 census.

== Facilities ==
The suburb has a private school, Casey Grammar School, and the Cranbourne area Chisholm TAFE. Cranbourne East P-12 School, is being built and is set to open from Preparation grade in February 2011.

It is home to the Casey Complex, originally called Cranbourne Complex, officially opened in December 1994 by the City of Cranbourne. The complex is home to the head office of the Casey-Cardinia Library Cooperation, and is home also to the Cranbourne Bowlland, a ten-pin bowling complex. In June 2009, the City of Casey opened Casey RACE, its Recreation and Aquatic Centre (capitalising "centre" as "CEntre"), directly next to the sporting facility of Casey Complex, and features a 50m olympic swimming pool, water slides, gymnasium and general aquatic facilities.

Part of the Melbourne urban growth boundary runs to the south of the suburb.

== Transport ==
- 896 Cranbourne – Cranbourne East (every day). Operated by Cranbourne Transit.
- 898 Cranbourne – Archers Field Dve. Operated by Cranbourne Transit.

There are proposals for a Cranbourne East railway station near Reynard Street. However, a passenger service has not run on this section of track since July 1993 and the line is no longer used, and is not electrified. The State Government's 2008 Victorian Transport Plan transport policy includes the new station at Cranbourne East, and have given it a medium timeframe for construction. It was scheduled to be built by 2015, at a cost of $200 million. Such an extension would extend suburban services by around 2 km.

== Future residential developments ==
The Growth Areas Authority released a draft report known as the 'Cranbourne East Development Plan' in 2008, aiming to develop available land within the following few years within the suburb and neighbouring Clyde North. The land is roughly bounded by the South Gippsland Highway, Casey Fields, Berwick – Cranbourne Road, and Thompson Road. The development plan includes a mixture of parkland, high and low density housing, and a small industrial precinct. The division began in 2008 and continues As of 2009, and includes the housing development estate Cascades on Clyde.

== See also ==
- City of Cranbourne – Cranbourne East was previously within this former local government area.
