= Moonlit Sanctuary Wildlife Conservation Park =

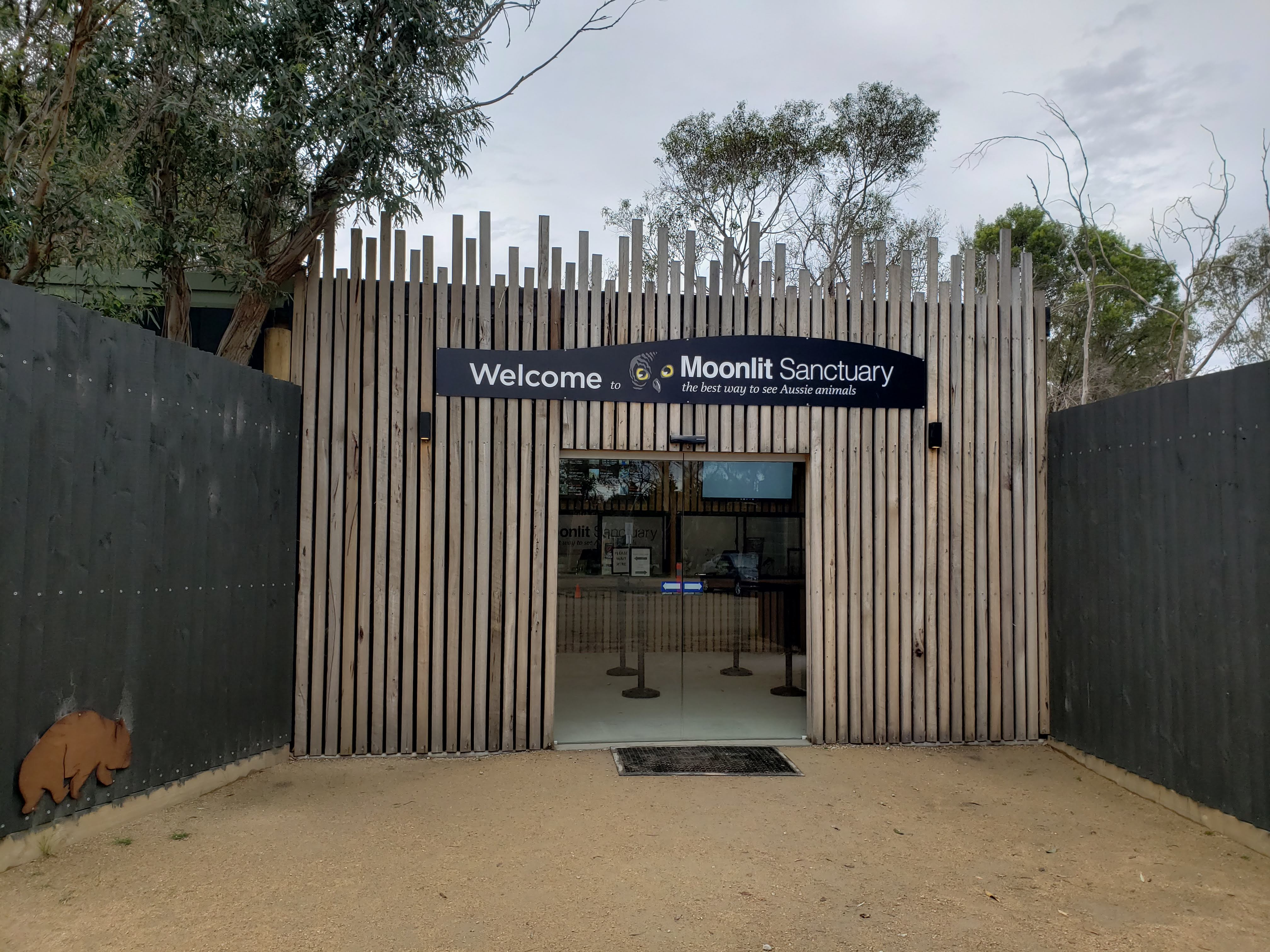
- Entrance
- Interactive map of Moonlit Sanctuary Wildlife Conservation Park
- 38.2128697°S 145.2497506°E
- Date opened: 2001
- Location: Pearcedale, Victoria, Australia
- Land area: 25 acres (10 ha)
- No. of animals: 400
- No. of species: 60
- Memberships: ZAA, Ecotourism Australia
- Website: moonlitsanctuary.com.au

Moonlit Sanctuary Wildlife Conservation Park is a 25-acre (10 ha) wikt:biopark within the Pearcedale Conservation Park located at Pearcedale on the Mornington Peninsula near Melbourne, Australia. It aims to display the fauna that was found in the Mornington Peninsula and Western Port Biosphere Reserve prior to European settlement as well as working towards the recovery of threatened Australian fauna. The park is open all year except on Christmas Day. The sanctuary, as part of Pearcedale Conservation Park, is an institutional member of the Zoo and Aquarium Association (ZAA). It is ECO Certified at the Ecotourism level by Ecotourism Australia.

== History ==
Development of the zoo started in December 1998, with construction of a visitor center, a 2-acre (0.81 ha) wetland habitat with a lake, and more than 30 animal enclosures, as well as many Australian trees and other plants. The zoo was opened in September 2001.

== Evening walks ==
Moonlit Sanctuary operates evening walks, which are an environmental immersion experience. A guide takes visitors on a walk through natural bushland where the guide spotlights a variety of nocturnal animals, many of them endangered. The guide gives talks about the animals, and answers visitors' questions. Visitors come into close contact with the animals in their natural habitats and can observe their natural behaviours.

== Daytime visits ==
Moonlit Sanctuary is also open during the day, where visitors get an experience closer to a normal zoo. It operates education services for school children, and provides research facilities for graduate students. It also engages in conservation breeding of endangered species.

== Animals ==
In total over 400 animals representing over 60 different species call the sanctuary home. Some examples of the native animal species kept at the sanctuary are listed below:

- Banded lapwing
- Banded stilt
- Bare-nosed wombat
- Barking owl
- Bush stone-curlew
- Central bearded dragon
- Chestnut-eared finch
- Cunningham's spiny-tailed skink
- Dingo
- Eastern barn owl
- Eastern blue-tongued lizard
- Eastern grey kangaroo
- Eastern long-necked turtle
- Eastern whipbird
- Eclectus parrot
- Emu
- Gang-gang cockatoo
- Gippsland water dragon
- Helmeted honeyeater
- Kangaroo Island grey kangaroo
- Koala
- Lace monitor
- Laughing kookaburra
- Long-nosed potoroo
- Major Mitchell's cockatoo
- Orange-bellied parrot
- Rainbow lorikeet
- Red-bellied pademelon
- Red-necked wallaby
- Red-tailed black cockatoo
- Regent honeyeater
- Rufous bettong
- Sacred kingfisher
- Satin bowerbird
- Shingleback lizard
- Southern bettong
- Southern hairy-nosed wombat
- Spinifex hopping mouse
- Spotted tree monitor
- Spotted-tailed quoll
- Squirrel glider
- Sulphur-crested cockatoo
- Superb parrot
- Swamp wallaby
- Swift parrot
- Tammar wallaby
- Tasmanian devil
- Tawny frogmouth
- Wedge-tailed eagle
- White-browed woodswallow
- Woylie
- Yellow-bellied glider
- Yellow-tailed black cockatoo

== Conservation ==
Moonlit has successfully bred a number of rare and endangered species including southern bettong (a.k.a. eastern bettong), eastern quoll, Julia Creek dunnart, fluffy glider (yellow-bellied glider) and squirrel glider. The eastern quoll and southern bettong are now extinct on the mainland and only found in the wild in Tasmania. In 2016 it opened a new breeding facility for the critically endangered orange-bellied parrots, designed to house up to 20 pairs.

== Awards ==
In 2009, Moonlit Sanctuary won the Victorian Keep Australia Beautiful award for Preservation of the Environment with an emphasis on local fauna and flora.

In 2010, Moonlit Sanctuary won the Victorian Tourism Award for Ecotourism, subsequently winning this award for a second time in 2014. After winning for a fifth time in 2021, Moonlit Sanctuary was inducted into the Victorian Tourism Awards Hall of Fame.

In 2018, Moonlit Sanctuary won the Victorian Tourism Award for Tourism Attraction as well as Ecotourism. Subsequently, they won Silver for Ecotourism at the 2018 Australian Tourism Awards.
