= Howard Richardson (footballer) =

Australian rules footballer

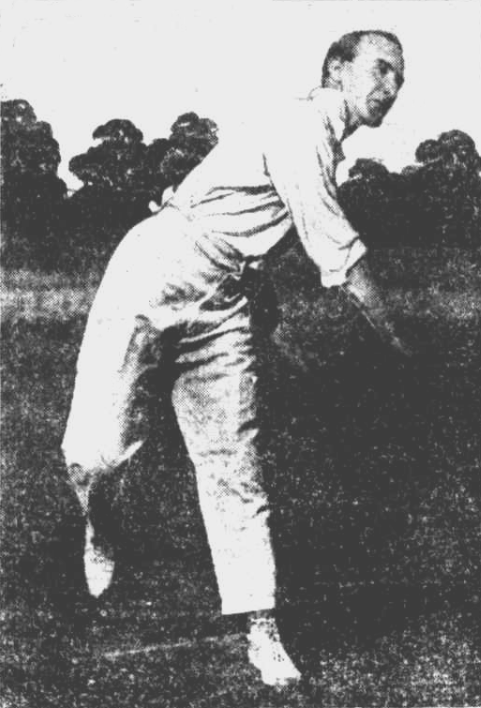

Personal information
- Full name: Howard James Richardson
- Born: 29 October 1894; Narre Warren, Victoria
- Died: 21 December 1959 (aged 65); Richmond, Victoria
- Original team: Berwick
- Height: 175 cm (5 ft 9 in)

Playing career^{1}
| Years | Club | Games (Goals) |
| 1915–1917 | Richmond | 19 (14) |
| 1919 | Melbourne | 1 (0) |
| Total | | 20 (14) |
- ^{1} Playing statistics correct to the end of 1919.

Howard James Richardson (29 October 1894 – 21 December 1959) was an Australian sportsman who played first-class cricket for Victoria and Australian rules football in the Victorian Football League (VFL) with Richmond and Melbourne.

Richardson, who was born in Narre Warren, played his early football at Berwick before making his debut for Richmond in the 1915 VFL season. He made sporadic appearances over the next couple of seasons and, after not playing at all in 1918, he crossed to Melbourne. Richardson took the field only once at Melbourne and finished his league career with 20 games and 14 goals.

At Hobart in 1924, Richardson played his only first-class cricket match with Victoria taking on Tasmania. He was his state's best bowler in the first innings when he took 4/34 and also contributed an unbeaten 29 with the bat.

== See also ==
- List of Victoria first-class cricketers
