= Cranbourne West =

- Suburb
- Interactive map of Cranbourne West
- Coordinates: 38.103°S 145.267°E
- Country: Australia
- State: Victoria
- City: Melbourne
- LGA: City of Casey
- Location: 40 km (25 mi) from Melbourne; 3 km (1.9 mi) from Cranbourne

Government
  - State electorate: Cranbourne
  - Federal division: Holt

Area
  - Total: 3.5 km^{2} (1.4 sq mi)

Population
  - Total: 19,969 (2021 census)
  - Density: 5,710/km^{2} (14,780/sq mi)
- Postcode: 3977
Suburbs around Cranbourne West
Lyndhurst	Lyndhurst	Cranbourne North
Skye	Cranbourne West	Cranbourne
Langwarrin	Cranbourne South	Botanic Ridge

Cranbourne West is a suburb in Melbourne, Victoria, Australia, 40 km south-east of Melbourne's Central Business District, located within the City of Casey local government area. Cranbourne West recorded a population of 19,969 at the 2021 census.

Cranbourne West has developed since the 1990s, and in 2006 had a new shopping centre opened called "The Sandhurst Centre", on the corner of Duff Street and Monahans Road.

The Cranbourne West Development Plan was released in 2008 by the City of Casey and includes a large parcel of land bounded by Thompsons Road to the north, Evans Road to the east, Western Port Highway to the west, and Ballarto Road and the urban growth boundary (as of 2012) to the south. Cranbourne West includes part of the large industrial area, a shopping centre with a Woolworths supermarket, housing, a network of parks and pathways, a primary school, and a secondary college. Low-density housing is provided for at the south of the parcel north of the urban growth boundary. The suburb's population grew rapidly during the 2010s, more than doubling from 8,743 in 2011 to 19,969 in 2021.

== Education ==
There are two primary schools; Quarters Primary School in the north and Barton Primary School in the south. Cranbourne West Secondary College is on Strathlea Drive. A Year 7-12 private Roman Catholic School, St Peters College, is situated on Sladen Street in the far south of the suburb.

== See also ==
- City of Cranbourne – Cranbourne West was previously within this former local government area.
