= City of Berwick =

Coordinates: 38°02′28″S 145°20′56″E

- Local government area
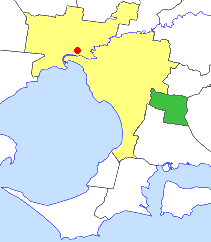
- Location in Melbourne

- The extent of the City of Berwick at its dissolution in 1994
- Country: Australia
- State: Victoria
- Region: Outer Southeast Melbourne
- Established: 1973
- Council seat: Narre Warren

Area
  - Total: 120.43 km^{2} (46.50 sq mi)

Population
  - Total: 75,400 (1992)
  - Density: 626.1/km^{2} (1,621.6/sq mi)
- County: Mornington
LGAs around City of Berwick
Knox	Sherbrooke	Sherbrooke
Dandenong	City of Berwick	Pakenham
Dandenong	Cranbourne	Pakenham

The City of Berwick was a local government area about 40 kilometres (25 mi) southeast of Melbourne, the state capital of Victoria, Australia. The city covered an area of 120.43 square kilometres (46.50 sq mi), and existed from 1973 until 1994.

== History ==
The area which came under the City of Berwick had previously been the Berwick and Doveton ridings of the Shire of Berwick. It had been incorporated as the Berwick Road District on 24 October 1862 and became a shire on 12 May 1868. On 1 October 1973, the area surrounding Berwick and Narre Warren, which was undergoing rapid population growth and urbanisation, split from the shire and was proclaimed a city. The remaining rural area was renamed the Shire of Pakenham on 1 September 1974.

On 15 December 1994, the City of Berwick was abolished, and along with parts of the City of Cranbourne, was merged into the newly created City of Casey. The Doveton industrial district was transferred to the newly created City of Greater Dandenong.

Council met at the Narre Warren Civic Centre, adjacent to Westfield Fountain Gate, in Narre Warren. The facility continued to remain in use by the City of Casey until its replacement by Bunjil Place in the late 2010s. It was subsequently demolished.

== Wards ==
The City of Berwick was divided into four wards, each of which elected three councillors:

- Centre Ward
- East Ward
- North Ward
- South Ward

== Suburbs ==
- Beaconsfield (shared with the Shire of Pakenham)
- Berwick
- Doveton
- Endeavour Hills
- Eumemmering
- Hallam
- Harkaway
- Narre Warren*
- Narre Warren North
- Narre Warren South

* Council seat.

== Population ==
Year	Population
1971	20,474
1976	25,616
1981	36,181
1986	48,677
1991	69,144
2016	47,614
