= Cranbourne South =

- Town
- Interactive map of Cranbourne South
- Coordinates: 38.147°S 145.235°E
- Country: Australia
- State: Victoria
- LGA: City of Casey
- Location: 49 km (30 mi) from Melbourne; 6 km (3.7 mi) from Cranbourne

Government
  - State electorates: Cranbourne; Bass
  - Federal division: Holt

Area
  - Total: 1.2 km^{2} (0.46 sq mi)

Population
  - Total: 3,241 (2021 census)
  - Density: 2,700/km^{2} (7,000/sq mi)
- Postcode: 3977
Localities around Cranbourne South
Skye	Cranbourne West	Botanic Ridge
Langwarrin	Cranbourne South	Devon Meadows
Langwarrin South	Pearcedale	Devon Meadows

Cranbourne South is a locality in Melbourne, Victoria, Australia, 49 km south-east of Melbourne's Central Business District, located within the City of Casey local government area. Cranbourne South recorded a population of 3,241 at the 2021 census.

By 2009 the urban growth boundary had moved along Pearcedale and Browns Road, placing a large area of the locality inside the main growth area. Two large scale housing developments, Botanic Ridge and Settlers Run Estate, were established in the area which was excised as the suburb of Botanic Ridge.

In 2019, development in Cranbourne South's area began with a new estate called Brompton. The part located within Cranbourne South is bounded by a new part of Ballarto Road to the north, Dandenong-Hastings Road to the west and Cranbourne Road to the south and east.

The suburb has a small primary school, a petrol station and a general store.

== See also ==
- City of Cranbourne – Cranbourne South was previously within this former local government area.
