= Mornington Peninsula and Western Port Biosphere Reserve =

Biosphere reserve in Australia

- Location within Victoria
- Location: Victoria
- Coordinates: 38°20′S 145°20′E
- Area: 2,142.00 km^{2} (827.03 sq mi)
- Established: November 2002
- Visitors: 400,000 (annual estimate) (in 2016)
- Governing body: Western Port Biosphere Reserve
- Website: Official website

Mornington Peninsula and Western Port Biosphere Reserve is a biosphere reserve in the Australian state of Victoria located on land and coastal waters associated both with the Mornington Peninsula and the bay known as Western Port.

The biosphere reserve was described by UNESCO in 2016 as:

The Mornington Peninsula and Western Port Biosphere Reserve includes the whole of Mornington Peninsula Shire and parts of the City of Frankston, as well as coastal areas of the municipalities of Casey, Cardinia and Bass Coast including Phillip and French Islands. Western Port, which is also a Ramsar Site, consists of a coastal embayment incorporating vast and relatively undisturbed mudflats with salt marsh vegetation. It is considered an internationally important feeding and roosting area for numerous species of summering waders, many of which are listed under the bilateral Migratory Birds Agreements (with China and Japan). The site periodically supports over 10,000 waders and 10,000 ducks and swans, and a rich invertebrate fauna of some 1,380 species.

The biosphere reserve was established in November 2002.

The managing authority is the Mornington Peninsula and Western Port Biosphere Reserve Foundation Ltd which trades under the name of the Western Port Biosphere Reserve.

== See also ==
- List of biosphere reserves in Australia
