= Clyde, Victoria =

Clyde
- Suburb
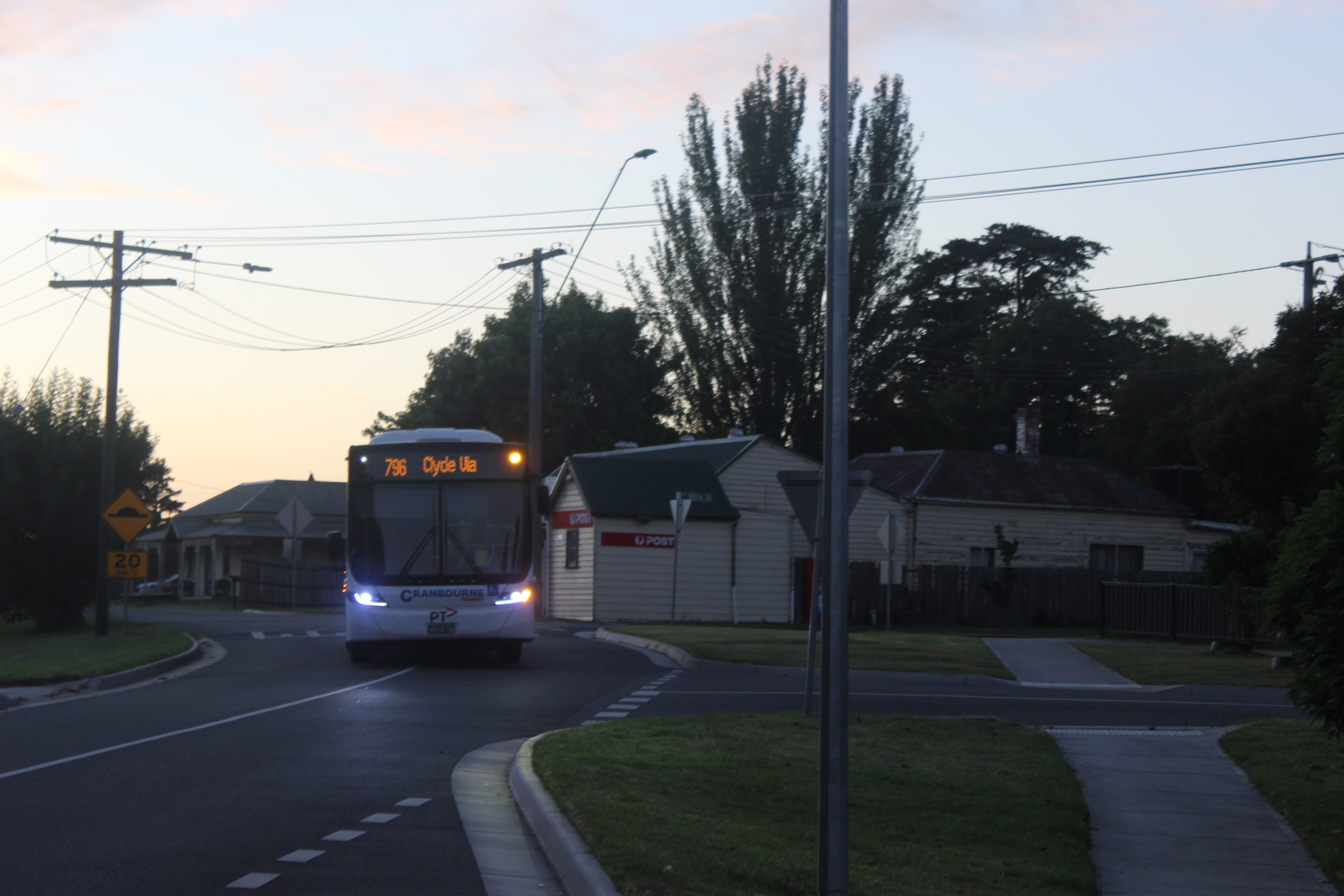
- Railway Road

- Interactive map of Clyde
- Coordinates: 38.132°S 145.327°E
- Country: Australia
- State: Victoria
- City: Melbourne
- LGA: City of Casey
- Location: 48 km (30 mi) from Melbourne; 9 km (5.6 mi) from Cranbourne

Government
  - State electorates: Bass; Cranbourne; Hastings
  - Federal division: Holt

Area
  - Total: 40.2 km^{2} (15.5 sq mi)
- Elevation: 8 m (26 ft)

Population
  - Total: 11,177 (2021 census)
  - Density: 278.0/km^{2} (720.1/sq mi)
- Postcode: 3978
Suburbs around Clyde
Cranbourne	Clyde North	Officer South
Cranbourne East	Clyde	Cardinia
Devon Meadows	Tooradin	Dalmore

Clyde is a suburb of Melbourne, Victoria, Australia, 48 km south-east of Melbourne's Central Business District, located within the City of Casey local government area. Clyde recorded a population of 11,177 at the 2021 census.

== History ==
Clyde Post Office on the Berwick-Cranbourne Road opened on 25 January 1864. In 1915 it was renamed Clyde North, and Clyde Railway Station office (open since 1888) was renamed Clyde.

== Description ==
The original township of Clyde is located in a small triangle between Twyford Road, Clyde-Five Ways Road and Ballarto Road and contains a primary school, CFA fire station, general store and community hall. Nearby are the Inghams poultry feed mill, built in 1979, and Lineham Oval, a sports oval which is home to the Clyde club in the West Gippsland Cricket Association.

Shopping on Clyde is the suburb's main shopping area, located at the corner of Berwick-Cranbourne Road and Morison Road. It contains a Coles supermarket and a number of specialty stores.

Immediately to the west of the suburb's boundaries is the Casey Fields sporting complex.

== Transport ==
Clyde railway station was formerly situated on the South Gippsland railway corridor that operated to its terminus at Yarram in the early 1980s and Leongatha in the mid-1990s. A V/Line road coach service replaced the rail service to Leongatha on 24 July 1993, running between Melbourne and Yarram. However, since the closure of the South Gippsland rail line—with the exception of the locally run tourist railway between Nyora and Leongatha—by the Kennett Victorian government on 14 December 1994. Proposals have been made to extend the existing Cranbourne line to Clyde, however, works are unlikely to commence before 2030.

Along Pattersons Road is the Route 897 bus, which runs to Lynbrook Station via Cranbourne. The old Clyde township is served by the route 796 loop service which runs from Cranbourne via Devon Meadows.

== See also ==
- City of Cranbourne – Clyde was previously within this former local government area.
