= Blind Bight, Victoria =

Blind Bight
- Town
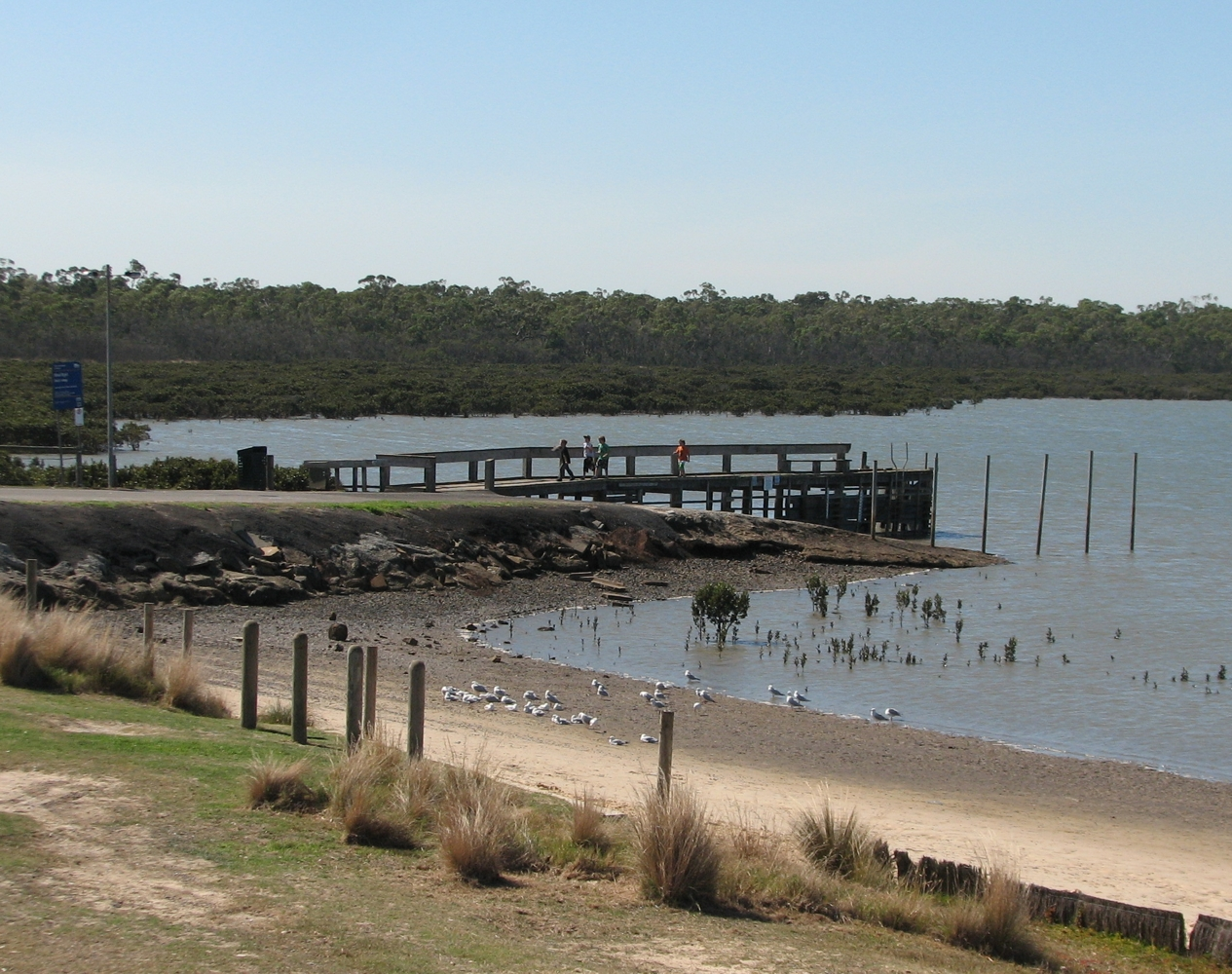

- Interactive map of Blind Bight
- Coordinates: 38.214°S 145.340°E
- Country: Australia
- State: Victoria
- LGA: City of Casey
- Location: 55 km (34 mi) from Melbourne; 16 km (9.9 mi) from Cranbourne

Government
  - State electorate: Bass
  - Federal division: Holt

Population
  - Total: 1,290 (2021 census)
- Postcode: 3980

Blind Bight is a town in Victoria, Australia, 55 km south-east of Melbourne's Central Business District, located within the City of Casey local government area. Blind Bight recorded a population of 1,290 at the 2021 census.

Located on the large bay of Western Port, Blind Bight is a mangrove area, offering birdwatching opportunities and walking tracks along the foreshore and in surrounding bushland. The town contains a community centre, Sanjos general store and post office, a playground, a basketball court, picnic facilities, a boat ramp and a lookout over the bay. Of the coastal villages in the area it is the most populated and developed. Blind Bight Post Office opened on 25 July 1994. Blind Bight is a very low-wave-energy environment and is also quite sheltered and calm. Nearby shopping precincts include Cranbourne Park Shopping Centre (14 km), Shopping on Clyde (13 km), Botanic Ridge Village (11 km), and the shops in Tooradin (6 km).

It is serviced periodically by bus route 795 operated by Cranbourne Transit.

== Education ==
Most of the children in the area go to Tooradin Primary School, Koo Wee Rup Secondary College or Cranbourne Secondary College. School buses are operated by Westernport Road Lines, Cranbourne Transit and Berwick Bus Lines.

== See also ==
- City of Cranbourne – Blind Bight was previously within this former local government area.
