= Dalmore, Victoria =

Coordinates: 38°11′24″S 145°25′30″E

Dalmore
- Town
- Country: Australia
- State: Victoria
- LGA: Shire of Cardinia
- Location: 58 km (36 mi) from Melbourne

Government
  - State electorate: Bass
  - Federal division: Monash

Population
  - Total: 142 (2021 census)
- Postcode: 3981

Dalmore is a locality in Victoria, Australia, 58 km south-east of Melbourne's Central Business District, located within the Shire of Cardinia local government area. Dalmore recorded a population of 142 at the 2021 census.

== History ==
The Post Office opened on 17 March 1913 and closed in 1977. A Dalmore East office was open from 1920 until 1946.

== Today ==
In conjunction with neighbouring township Tooradin, an Australian Rules football team (Tooradin-Dalmore) competes in the South East Football Netball League.

== See also ==
- City of Cranbourne – Dalmore was previously within this former local government area.
