= Cranbourne, Victoria =

Cranbourne
- Suburb
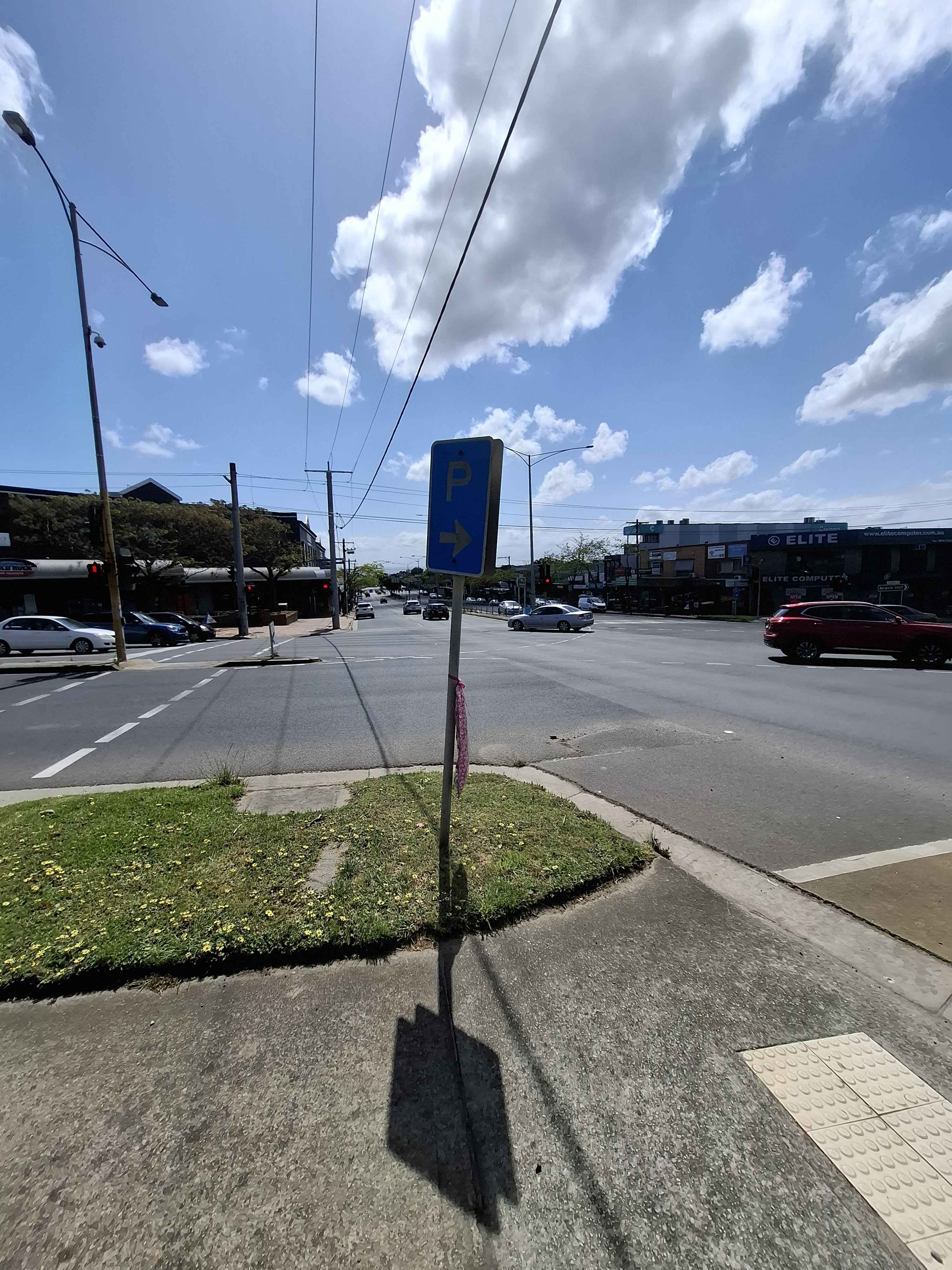
- High Street

- Interactive map of Cranbourne
- Coordinates: 38.105°S 145.279°E
- Country: Australia
- State: Victoria
- City: Melbourne
- LGA: City of Casey
- Location: 43 km (27 mi) from Melbourne; 13 km (8.1 mi) from Dandenong; 43 km (27 mi) from Phillip Island; 15 km (9.3 mi) from Frankston

Government
  - State electorate: Cranbourne
  - Federal division: Holt

Area
  - Total: 9.6 km^{2} (3.7 sq mi)
- Elevation: 62 m (203 ft)

Population
  - Total: 21,281 (2021 census)
  - Density: 2,217/km^{2} (5,741/sq mi)
- Postcode: 3977
- Mean max temp: 19.4 °C (66.9 °F)
- Mean min temp: 9.8 °C (49.6 °F)
- Annual rainfall: 809.8 mm (31.88 in)
Suburbs around Cranbourne
| Lynbrook | Cranbourne North | Cranbourne North |
| Cranbourne West | Cranbourne | Cranbourne East |
| Botanic Ridge | Junction Village | Clyde |

Cranbourne (/ˈkrænbɜːrn/) is a suburb in Melbourne, Victoria, Australia, 43 km south-east of Melbourne's Central Business District, located within the City of Casey local government area. Cranbourne recorded a population of 21,281 at the 2021 census.

The ever expanding greater Cranbourne area consists of Cranbourne, Cranbourne North, Cranbourne East, Cranbourne South and Cranbourne West.

== History ==
Prior to European settlement, the Boonwurrung people were the traditional owners of the area now known as Cranbourne. The first white settlers, the Ruffy brothers, arrived in 1836. They later opened the Cranbourne Inn.

The area was greatly opened up by settlers from the 1860s, with Cranbourne Post Office having been opened on 1 August 1857.

Progress in developing the land around Cranbourne was hampered by the Koo-Wee-Rup Swamp. However William Lyall (who bought land in the swamp area) assisted in coordinating the draining of the swamp to make it usable as farmland.

Cranbourne was, from 1860 until 1994, the administrative centre of the Shire of Cranbourne, (known for most of 1994 as the City of Cranbourne). The council building is still in existence, and is now used as a health care centre known as 'The Cranbourne Integrated Care Centre'. Prior to 1978, Council met at the Old Shire Offices, on the corner of Sladen Street and South Gippsland Highway.

=== Heritage listing ===
The following place in Cranbourne is listed on the Victorian Heritage Register:

- Avenue of Honour, a memorial avenue of oak trees located on the South Gippsland Highway

== Demographics ==
At the 2006 census, Cranbourne had a population of 14,750. At the 2016 census, Cranbourne had a population of 20,094. At the 2021 census, Cranbourne recorded a population of 21,281

62.3% of people were born in Australia. The next most common countries of birth were India 5.4%, England 3.3%, New Zealand 3.1%, Afghanistan 1.9% and Philippines 1.4%. 68.5% of people spoke only English at home. Other languages spoken at home included Punjabi 2.6%, Hazaraghi 1.2%, Samoan 1.2%, Hindi 1.2% and Dari 1.1%. The most common responses for religion were No Religion 28.8%, Catholic 21.3% and Anglican 10.2%.

== Climate ==
Cranbourne possesses an oceanic climate (Köppen: Cfb), with tepid, relatively dry summers and cool, wetter winters. Average maxima vary from 25.8 °C (78.4 °F) in February to 13.4 °C (56.1 °F) in July while average minima fluctuate between 14.0 °C (57.2 °F) in February and 6.2 °C (43.2 °F) in July. Mean precipitation is moderate (averaging 809.8 mm (31.88 in) per annum). But due to the "bay-effect", rainfall is frequent, as Cranbourne receives 182.4 precipitation days annually (with a maximum frequency of rain in winter). Extreme temperatures have ranged from 46.0 °C (114.8 °F) on 7 February 2009 to −2.5 °C (27.5 °F) on 13 September 1996.

Climate data for Cranbourne (38.13°S 145.26°E, 85 m AMSL) (1990-2020 normals & extremes)
| Month | Jan | Feb | Mar | Apr | May | Jun | Jul | Aug | Sep | Oct | Nov | Dec | Year |
|---|---|---|---|---|---|---|---|---|---|---|---|---|---|
| Record high °C (°F) | 44.0 (111.2) | 46.0 (114.8) | 39.7 (103.5) | 34.5 (94.1) | 26.5 (79.7) | 22.5 (72.5) | 22.5 (72.5) | 25.5 (77.9) | 30.0 (86.0) | 35.0 (95.0) | 38.0 (100.4) | 41.8 (107.2) | 46.0 (114.8) |
| Mean daily maximum °C (°F) | 25.5 (77.9) | 25.8 (78.4) | 23.6 (74.5) | 20.0 (68.0) | 16.4 (61.5) | 14.0 (57.2) | 13.4 (56.1) | 14.5 (58.1) | 16.6 (61.9) | 19.1 (66.4) | 21.0 (69.8) | 23.5 (74.3) | 19.5 (67.0) |
| Mean daily minimum °C (°F) | 13.7 (56.7) | 14.0 (57.2) | 12.5 (54.5) | 10.3 (50.5) | 8.5 (47.3) | 6.7 (44.1) | 6.2 (43.2) | 6.5 (43.7) | 7.8 (46.0) | 8.9 (48.0) | 10.3 (50.5) | 11.9 (53.4) | 9.8 (49.6) |
| Record low °C (°F) | 5.5 (41.9) | 6.4 (43.5) | 4.5 (40.1) | 2.1 (35.8) | 0.5 (32.9) | −0.8 (30.6) | −0.7 (30.7) | −1.6 (29.1) | −2.5 (27.5) | 0.6 (33.1) | 3.7 (38.7) | 4.1 (39.4) | −2.5 (27.5) |
| Average precipitation mm (inches) | 52.5 (2.07) | 49.8 (1.96) | 44.2 (1.74) | 68.0 (2.68) | 67.2 (2.65) | 78.3 (3.08) | 71.3 (2.81) | 81.7 (3.22) | 83.2 (3.28) | 73.4 (2.89) | 73.8 (2.91) | 67.3 (2.65) | 809.8 (31.88) |
| Average precipitation days (≥ 0.2 mm) | 10.2 | 8.5 | 11.4 | 14.8 | 19.1 | 19.4 | 20.0 | 20.1 | 18.1 | 15.6 | 13.5 | 11.7 | 182.4 |
Source: Bureau of Meteorology (1990-2020 normals & extremes)

== Schools ==
Some of the schools located in the Cranbourne area are:

- Alkira Secondary College (formerly known as Casey Central Secondary College)
- Barton Primary School
- Casey Fields Primary School in Cranbourne East
- Casey Grammar School (formerly known as Cranbourne Christian College)
- Chisholm Institute of TAFE (Cranbourne Campus)
- Courtenay Gardens Primary School
- Cranbourne Carlisle Primary School*
- Cranbourne East Primary School
- Cranbourne East Secondary College,
- Cranbourne Park Primary School*
- Cranbourne Primary School*
- Cranbourne Secondary College*
- Cranbourne Specialist School
- Cranbourne West Primary School*
- Cranbourne West Secondary College
- Lyndhurst Primary School
- Lyndhurst Secondary College (formerly known as Cranbourne Meadows Technical School)
- Marnebek School
- Rangebank Primary School*
- St. Agatha's Catholic School*
- St. Peter's College (West and East campus)
- St. Therese's Catholic Primary School
- Tulliallan Primary School

*Located in the suburb of Cranbourne

To cater for the growth in population within Cranbourne, several primary schools have been proposed.

== Shopping ==
Cranbourne has two major shopping precincts. In the north of Cranbourne, on the corner of Thompsons Road and the South Gippsland Highway is the Thompson Parkway Shopping Centre (anchored by Woolworths) and HomeCo Cranbourne (also known by its original name of Cranbourne Homemaker Centre).

In the centre of town is High Street and Cranbourne Park Shopping Centre (formerly known as Centro Cranbourne), anchored by a 17 aisle Coles Supermarket, a TK Maxx, Kmart, and Target. A standalone Aldi supermarket is located on Bakewell Street, ~400 metres from Cranbourne Park.

Smaller shopping centres include the Sandhurst Centre, anchored by an 11 aisle Coles Supermarket in Cranbourne West, Springhill shopping centre, including a Coles supermarket, and Hunt Club Village Shopping Centre in Cranbourne East with Woolworths, Aldi and 17 speciality stores.

Cranbourne also has four small shopping strips, on Camms Road, Hotham Street, Lurline Street and Cranbourne Place, all of which are made up entirely of small businesses.

== Sports facilities and clubs ==
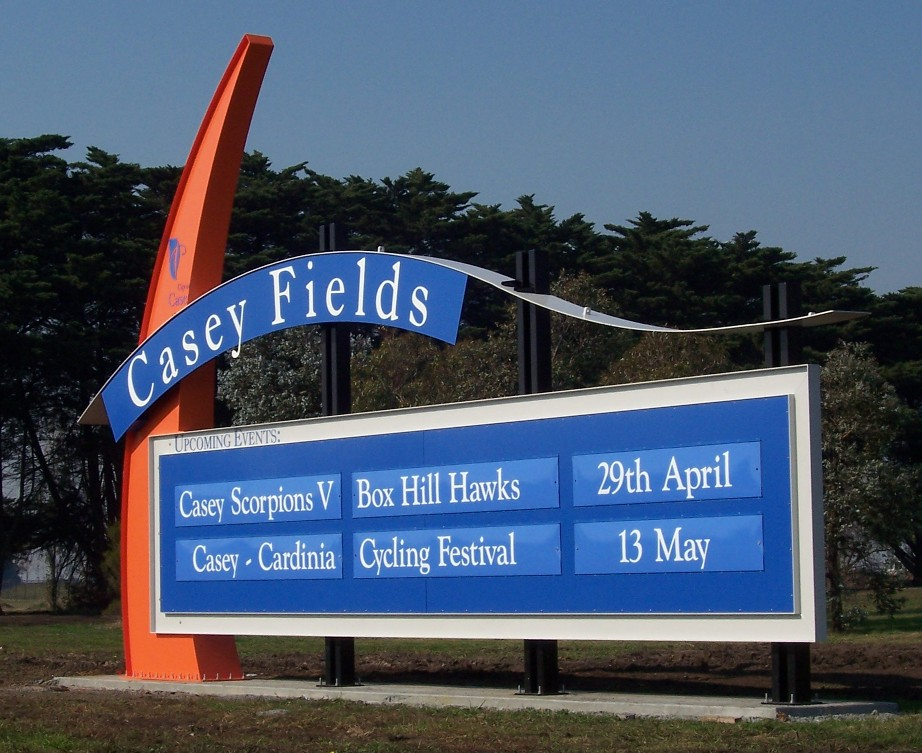
Casey Fields

Australian Football/Cricket Casey Demons, a team in the Victorian Football League, plays its home games at Casey Fields. The Casey Demons, formerly the Casey Scorpions, were formerly the Springvale Football Club. There are 9 Australian football/cricket ovals available at J&P Camm Reserve (2 ovals), the Donnelly Recreation Reserve (2 ovals), the Clyde Recreation Reserve (1 oval), the Lawson Poole Reserve (2 ovals), the Junction Village Reserve (1 oval) and the Glover Recreation Reserve (1 oval). Eight of the nine ovals each have a synthetic centre cricket wicket. The Cranbourne Cricket Club was established in 1881 with the Cranbourne Football Club established in 1889. There are 2 rugby fields at the Lawson Poole Reserve (1 field) and the Clyde Recreation Reserve (1 field). Sports reserves The town has an Australian Rules football team competing in the Outer East Football Netball League.

Football (Soccer) Casey Comets Football Club were founded in 1975 as Cranbourne Comets Football Club and changed to Casey Comets Football Club in 2007. Casey play at Comets Stadium on O'Tooles Road in Cranbourne. As of 2020, the Men's senior teams compete in the Football Federation Victoria State League 1 South-East league, and the Women's senior team compete in the Football Federation Victoria State League 1.

A-League team Melbourne City FC have their training ground and youth home ground at Casey Fields.

Basketball and Netball There are 6 basketball courts available at the Terry Vickerman Centre at the Casey Indoor Leisure Complex (shared netball). There is a netball court the Glover Recreation Reserve (1 outdoor court).

Tennis There are 32 tennis courts available at Cranbourne Tennis Club, Cranbourne Racecourse & Recreation Reserve (6 porous) and Casey Fields (10 poly clay and 2 plexipave); the Clyde Tennis Club, Clyde Recreation Reserve (6 plexipave); the Devon Meadows Tennis Club, Glover Recreation Reserve (6 poly clay); and the Cranbourne South Tennis Club, Morning Mist Recreation Reserve (2 artificial grass; 2 plexipave). There are an additional 8 courts (sand-filled artificial grass) available inside the Terry Vickerman Centre at the Casey Indoor Leisure Complex.

Golf

There are two golf courses privately owned and managed; Ranfurlie Golf Club (members course). and Cranbourne Golf Club (public course).

Horse Riding

Club-based horse riding is available at the Morning Mist Recreation Reserve in Cranbourne South around 15 minutes from the city centre.

Horse and Greyhound Racing

Cranbourne has a three code sport facility known as the Cranbourne Racing Centre and Racecourse. This hosts the horse racing club called the Southside Racing Club, which schedules around thirty race meetings a year including the Cranbourne Cup meeting in November. The second code is the Harness Racing Club which conducts regular meetings at its racetrack and the third code is the Cranbourne Greyhound Racing Club, which holds regular meetings.

Lawn Bowls

Two lawn bowls club facilities are available at the Cranbourne Bowls Club (Cranbourne Racecourse & Recreation Reserve) and the Cranbourne RSL Bowls Club.

Shooting

Shooting facilities are available at the Cranbourne Dandenong Pistol Club (Cranbourne Racecourse & Recreation Reserve). The Cranbourne RSL Gun Club (Thompsons Road, Cranbourne North) was demolished in late 2006, the Victorian Deer Association now meet at Akoonah Park in Berwick.

Skating/BMX

There are skating and BMX facilities available at the Merinda Park (outdoor skate park).

== Events ==
The MRA Cranbourne GP Run is held each year on the Saturday of the Australian Motorcycle Grand Prix.

- Casey Radio 97.7FM

== Public transport ==
The current terminus of the Cranbourne railway line is at Cranbourne railway station. The Cranbourne line is part of the South Gippsland Railway, which is currently disused between Cranbourne and the start of the private South Gippsland Tourist Railway in Nyora (now closed). The Cranbourne Line was to be extended by 2 km to Cranbourne East by 2015, as stated in the Victorian Transport Plan, but nothing has been done so far to show progress of the line extension. As of February 2022, the railway is duplicated. An extension of the line to Clyde was announced in 2021, as part of the Cranbourne Line Upgrade, with construction expected to begin around 2025.

The restoration and reopening of the disused line was proposed by the Victorian Government in 2001, at which time the government described the line as being in a state of significant disrepair. By 2008, a report had concluded that the rail service to Leongatha would not be restored due to the high cost in returning services. Instead, extra money will be spent on improving road coach services.

Cranbourne also has many bus services that help commuters travel to its surrounding suburbs.

== Environmental issues ==
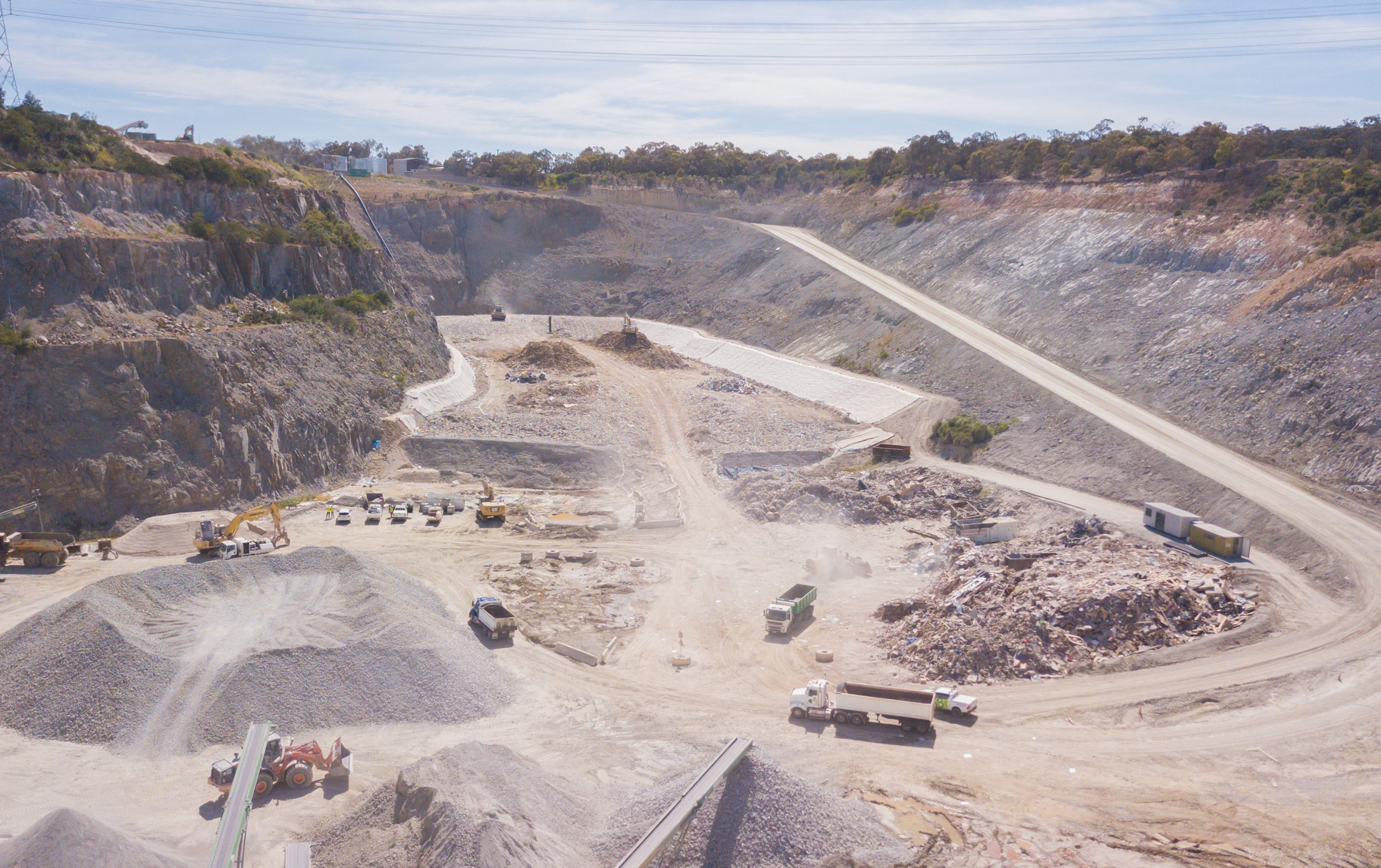
View of SBI landfill in Cranbourne

Stevensons Brothers Industries (SBI) Landfill in Cranbourne emitted odour pollution which impacted nearby residents. After receiving more than 5,000 complaints between mid 2021 to mid 2023, EPA Victoria took Stevensons Brothers Industries (SBI) Landfill to court claiming that the company failed to fulfil their general environmental duty due to the landfill's continued odour impact on nearby communities.

== See also ==
- City of Cranbourne – Cranbourne was previously within this former local government area.
