= Cranbourne Transit =

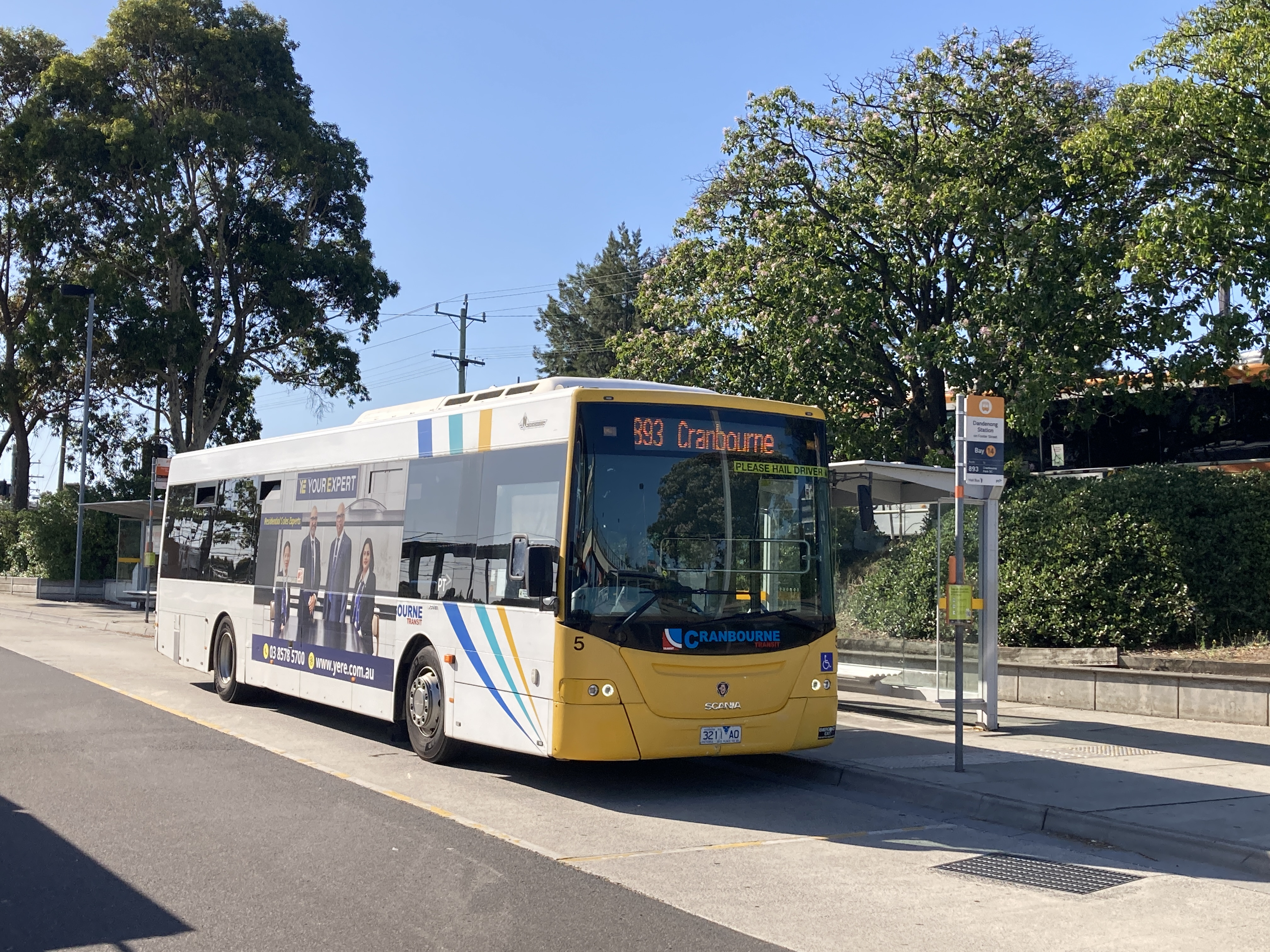
- Northcoast / Gemilang bodied Scania K230UB, January 2025
- Parent: Pulitano Group
- Headquarters: Cranbourne
- Service area: South-Eastern Melbourne
- Service type: Bus & coach operator
- Routes: 16
- Fleet: 75 (November 2026)
- Chief executive: Joe Pulitano
- Website: www.cranbournetransit.com.au

Cranbourne Transit is a bus operator in Melbourne, Australia. It operates 16 routes under contract to Public Transport Victoria. It is a subsidiary of the Pulitano Group.

== History ==
In August 1953, Phillips Bus Service purchased Woods Bus Services. On 1 February 2003, Phillips Bus Service was purchased by the Pulitano Group and renamed Cranbourne Transit.

== Fleet ==
As of November 2026, the fleet consists of 75 buses and coaches. Cranbourne Transit's fleet livery was white with a black stripe until it was replaced with a yellow front livery in 2010. The orange and white Public Transport Victoria livery was adopted in 2016.

== Routes Serviced ==
789 Frankston Station - Langwarrin via Langwarrin North

790 Frankston Station - Langwarrin via Langwarrin South

791 Frankston Station - Cranbourne Station

792 Cranbourne Station - Pearcedale

795 Warneet - Cranbourne Station

798 Cranbourne Park SC - Clyde North via Hardys Road

799 Merinda Park Station - The Avenue Village SC

881 Merinda Park Station - Clyde North

890 Dandenong Station - Lynbrook Station

891 Fountain Gate SC - Lynbrook Station via Hallam Station

892 Casey Central SC - Dandenong Station via Hampton Park SC

893 Cranbourne Park SC - Dandenong Station

894 Amberly Park - Hallam Station via Hampton Park

895 Narre Warren South - Fountain Gate SC via Narre Warren Station

897 Clyde North - Lynbrook Station via Cranbourne Park SC

898 Clyde North - Cranbourne Station via Cranbourne Park SC
