= Willow Grove, Victoria =

Willow Grove
- Town
- Coordinates: 38°05′0″S 146°12′0″E
- Country: Australia
- State: Victoria
- LGA: Shire of Baw Baw
- Location: 142 km (88 mi) E of Melbourne; 19 km (12 mi) NE of Moe; 12 km (7.5 mi) NE of Tanjil South

Government
  - State electorate: Narracan
  - Federal division: Monash
- Elevation: 161 m (528 ft)

Population
  - Total: 221 (2006 census)
- Postcode: 3825
Localities around Willow Grove
Hill End	Hill End	Tanjil Bren
Hill End	Willow Grove	Tanjil South
Hill End	Tanjil South	Tanjil South

Willow Grove is a town and rural farming community located in the Baw Baw foothills. It is northwest of Moe in Victoria, Australia and North of Trafalgar. It has a primary school, football club (although named for the neighbouring town of Hill End), tennis courts, community hall, general store, CFA shed, and kindergarten. It is a popular tourist destination where people can enjoy trail bike riding, camping, four wheel driving & hunting. The next town to the west is Hill End and to the east Tanjil South. Willow Grove is situated within the Shire of Baw Baw and shares the postcode 3825. At the 2006 census, Willow Grove and the surrounding area had a population of 221.

== History ==
Willow Grove Post Office opened on 9 November 1889.

== Blue Rock ==
The artificial lake, known as Blue Rock Dam or Blue Rock Lake, is named for an early goldmine in the area. Construction of the dam began in 1979 and was completed in 1984. The dam has a potential capacity of 208,000 megalitres. In conjunction with other supplies such as the Moondarra Reservoir, it provides water for household use, agriculture, industry, and power generation in surrounding areas, particularly in the Latrobe Valley. The lake is also used for recreational activities including fishing, sailing, swimming and picnicking. The lake is surrounded by farmland, bushland and, to the base of Blue Rock Road, the township of Willow Grove.

== Education ==
The community is serviced by a kindergarten and a public primary school, Willow Grove Primary School. At secondary level, students usually travel by school bus to the nearby towns of Moe, Trafalgar or Warragul/Drouin to attend Lowanna Secondary College, Lavalla Catholic College, Trafalgar High School, Chairo Christian School or Marist-Sion College.

== Industry ==
The main industry in the Willow Grove area is dairy farming.
