= Ken Dazzler Dunlop =

Australian wrestler (born 1960)

Ken "Dazzler" Dunlop
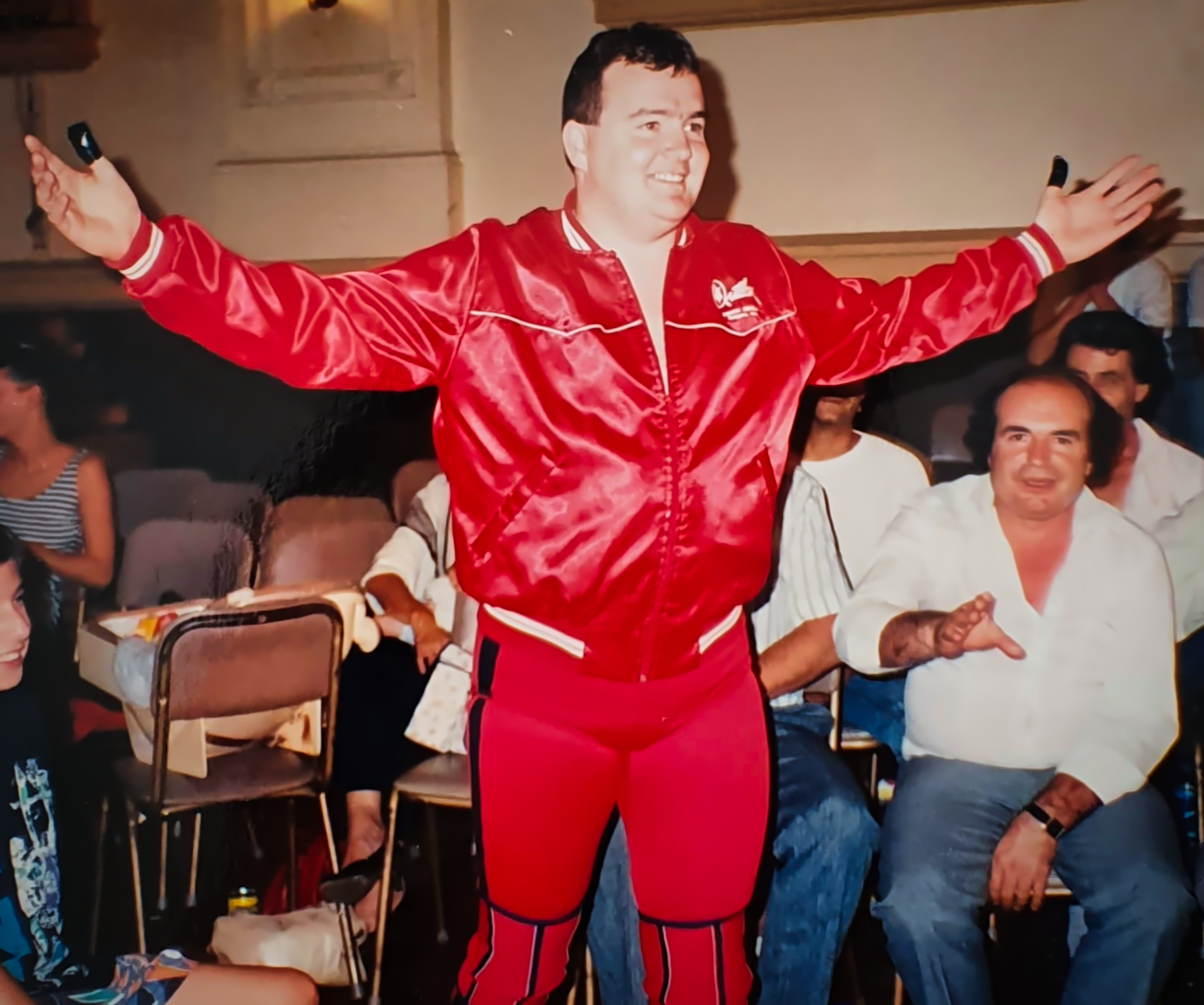
- Born: Ken Dunlop; November 1960 (age 65); Moe, Victoria, Australia
- Years active: 1978–2000
- Honours: Order of Australia

Ken "Dazzler" Dunlop (born November 1960) is a former Australian professional wrestler, wrestling promoter, and trainer. He is one of the first openly gay professional wrestlers in Australia. and the first to be awarded an Order of Australia Medal by the Australian Government for his service to professional wrestling.

== Early life ==
Dunlop was born in Moe, Victoria, Australia, where he spent the first thirteen years of his life.. He developed a passion for professional wrestling at a young age, watching World Championship Wrestling shows at Yallourn's Kernot Hall with his family, but it was his family's move to Melbourne where his passion really took off, going to Festival Hall with his mum every Saturday night to watch shows.

== Career ==
=== Professional wrestling ===
Dunlop began training as a professional wrestler in 1977 under the guidance of John Schneider, Sam Rossi, Jim Dimeros, Fred Burger, and Casey Miller at MB's Gym in North Melbourne, and also Mario Milano, Sherrie Sinatra, and Johnny Doyle at various gyms in Melbourne. He made his debut on August 11, 1978, at Watsonia RSL against fellow rookie Rob Magri.

After World Championship Wrestling ended in 1978, he moved to Sydney after impressing the city's main promoter at the time (Steve Rackman), who offered him more wrestling work.

From 1980 to 1991, he worked for numerous promotions including Main Event Promotions, Roy Heffernan's International Promotions, World Championship Wrestling, International Wrestling Promotions, All Star Wrestling Promotions, and World Wide Wrestling, and wrestled at various venues on the east coast of Australia including Festival Hall, Bass Hill Plaza, Ingleburn RSL, Liverpool RSL, Moe Town Hall, Apollo Stadium, and Marrickville RSL. It was Heffernan who gave him the wrestling name "Dazzler" in the mid-1980s.

He wrestled on Australian tours alongside international professional wrestlers the likes of Andre The Giant, Don Muraco, Killer Khan, Cyclone Negro, Spiros Arion, Mark Youngblood, and Jay Youngblood, as well as wrestling for Dale Martin Promotions (Joint Promotions) and Orig Williams (British Wrestling Federation) on a tour of the United Kingdom in 1992.

In 1991, he began promoting alongside Bob Blassie and Wayne "Lofty" Pickford as one of the co-owners of Down Under Wrestling Promotions (which later became The Australian Wrestling Alliance).

Dunlop won the Australian Heavyweight title four times and the Australian Light Heavyweight title twice in his career,and the Australian tag team title fifteen times (twelve times with Wayne "Lofty" Pickford as The Fabulous Kangaroos, twice with Ace Fenton as The Oz Rockers, and once with "Red Hot" Ricky Diamond).

Dunlop also wrestled under the alter ego Red Baron.

According to his autobiography, Dunlop trained the likes of Skyhawk, Ace Fenton, Kiss The Ultimate Male, Red Flair, Thunderbolt, and Mike Starr, who all worked in Sydney.

Over the years, Dunlop made several media appearances on Australian television programmes to promote professional wrestling, including Tonight Live with Steve Vizard and Sportsworld on the Seven Network, The NRL Footy Show and A Current Affair on the Nine Network, and Vox Populi on SBS

=== Retirement ===
In 1998, he retired from professional wrestling after suffering a mild heart attack, but returned for a handful of matches in 2000 with his younger brother Allan, who wrestled under the name "Red Hot" Ricky Diamond.

== Awards and recognition ==
Dunlop was inducted into the Australian New Age Wrestling Hall of Fame in 2015 for his achievements and services to the sport.

In 2026 he was awarded an Order of Australia Medal for his services and contributions to professional wrestling in Australia, the only professional wrestler to hold this honour.

On February 9, 2026, Australian House of Representatives member for Barton Ash Ambihaipahar gave a parliamentary speech about Dunlop's Order of Australia award, calling him "the embodiment of the Australian spirit" and praising his contribution to professional wrestling in Australia: "Over two decades, Ken travelled long distances to perform night after night to audiences in their hundreds, crammed into regional venues, leagues clubs and town halls across the country. This chapter in Australian pro wrestling history has been recorded only because of people like Ken and his autobiography, Inside My Squared Circle. It is no exaggeration to say that Ken was instrumental in keeping Australian pro wrestling alive and can be credited for its continued success and popularity today."

On June 20, 2026, Dunlop was honoured for his trailblazing contributions to Australian professional wrestling during Australian Championship Wrestling's inaugural show 'All Stars - A Night To Remember' held at Padstow RSL.

== Personal life ==
Dunlop is openly gay and has spoken publicly about his mental and emotional struggles with his sexuality, including attempting suicide.

He published his autobiography, Dazzler Dunlop: Inside My Squared Circle in 2021.The book took over two years to complete.

== See also ==
- Professional wrestling
- Amateur wrestling
