= Hill End, Victoria =

Hill End Victoria
- Coordinates: 38°00′0″S 146°09′0″E
- Population: 171 (2021 census)
- Postcode(s): 3825
- Elevation: 335 m (1,099 ft)
- Location: 95 km (59 mi) SE of Melbourne; 60 km (37 mi) SE of Belgrave; 26 km (16 mi) NW of Moe; 25 km (16 mi) N of Trafalgar
- LGA(s): Shire of Baw Baw
- State electorate(s): Narracan
- Federal division(s): Monash

Hill End is a locality in the West Gippsland region of Victoria, Australia. The locality is in the Shire of Baw Baw local government area, 104 kilometres (65 mi) east of the state capital, Melbourne. At the 2021 census, Hill End and the surrounding area had a population of 171. The main industry in Hill End area is dairy farming.

== History ==
Hillend Post Office opened on 8 January 1900 and closed in 1981.

== Demographics ==
Around 46 families live in the area and of those 47.0% have one or more children under the age of 15. 7.8% of families have only a single parent while 43.1% of couples have no children. Hill End covers an area of approximately 18002 hectares or around 180 square kilometres (km2) (44484 acres).

There are 82 private dwellings in Hill End. The composition of occupied private dwellings in Hill End is as follows: 97.8% separate houses, 0.0% semi-detached houses (e.g. townhouses, row or terrace houses), 0.0% flats (including units and apartments).

In terms of people aged 15 years or more living in Hill End 56.8% are married, 5.5% are divorced, 2.1% are separated, 2.1% are widowed and 30.1% have never married.

Compared to the rest of Australia, Hill End has a below average migrant population, with around 9.9% of residents being born overseas. The top 3 countries of birth for migrants in the area are: United Kingdom (5.3%), Netherlands (3.5%), New Zealand (2.3%).

== Education ==
Hill End Primary School closed in 2006, due to very low numbers of enrolments. At secondary level students usually travel by school bus to the nearby towns of Newborough to attend Lowanna Secondary College or Lavalla Catholic College, or to Trafalgar to attend Trafalgar High School.
