= John Robb (civil engineer) =

(1834–1896) contractor

John Robb (4 September 1834 – 18 May 1896) was an Irish immigrant to Australia who was responsible for several important civil engineering works.

== History ==
Robb was born in Lislaird near Castlederg, County Tyrone, Ireland, to Arthur Robb and his wife Sarah Robb, née Bird. In 1854 Robb and two brothers Robert (aged 18) and Samuel (aged 15) left for Australia aboard Fitzjames, arriving at Melbourne in October 1854.

He joined the rush to the goldfields, teamed up with fellow Fitzjames passenger Thomas Stranger carting stone, then formed a partnership Overend & Robb with Best Overend (c. 1833 – 30 November 1877) as contractors. Thomas Stranger, whose sister Elizabeth he later married, was with them from the outset and served as their supervising engineer to at least 1888. Around 1860 Overend & Robb won a contract to demolish Batman's Hill to make way for the projected Spencer Street railway station. Later projects of Overend & Robb were the Sunbury Industrial Schools and sewerage and water supply works at Coleraine and Yan Yean in Victoria.

He won contracts to build railway lines in Victoria:

- 1874 - Overend & Robb - Port Fairy railway line between Geelong and Pettavel (Freshwater Creek), including the tunnel
- 1875 - Overend & Robb - Portland railway line between Ararat and Hamilton, then between Hamilton and Portland, including the pier
- 1880 - John Robb - Lancefield railway line between Clarkefield and Lancefield
- 1883 - John Robb - Serviceton railway line between Sunshine and Parwan
- 1884 - John Robb - Mirboo North railway line (full line, Morwell to Mirboo North)
- 1885 - John Robb - Hopetoun railway line between Murtoa and Warracknabeal
- 1886 - John Robb - Thorpdale railway line between (full line, Moe and Thorpdale)

He built railways in other States: South Australia, Western Australia, Queensland and Tasmania.

- 1868 Western Line, Tasmania (Launceston and Deloraine railway) between Launceston and Deloraine.
- 1877 line from Kapunda, South Australia to the North West Bend, Murray River. It was while engaged on this project that Overend died, perhaps of heatstroke.
- Narracan Valley line
- Cairns railway in Queensland, whose costs exceeded £50,000, and the subject of considerable litigation.

Robb was also involved in water reticulation and sewerage projects in Victoria and South Australia, and the screwpile jetty and breakwater at Victor Harbor, South Australia, at the time heralded as an engineering marvel.

His last project was a section of the Cairns-to-Kuranda railway line in far North Queensland between Kamerunga & Myola, which involved a steep climb up the Barron Gorge. Robb’s 1887 tender of £290,094 was accepted, but proved inadequate for the work and expense involved, and though he was awarded another £20,000 after a lengthy legal battle, he lost substantially on the project. He was in 1894 found to be insolvent. The completion of the project is commemorated by a cairn at Kuranda.

Robb was a strong man who barely had a day's illness in his life, and died suddenly of apoplexy. His remains were buried in the Melbourne Cemetery.

== Other interests ==
- He was partner with Arthur Blackwood in Talawanta Station, near the Queensland border
- He had large sugar plantations on the Tweed River, New South Wales
- He had interests in mines of Ballarat, Rutherglen, and the tin-fields of Tasmania
- He was a major shareholder and founding director of the South Australian Brewing Company
- He was largely responsible for the building of the Wesleyan Church, Toorak
- He was associated with the Presbyterian Church
- He was a founding director of the Federal Bank in 1881
- He built the Royal Exchange on King William Street, Adelaide in 1888, as a private speculation.

== Recognition ==
- Robb's Monument, a natural stone pillar near Barron Gorge, was named for him.
- Robb's Building, long since demolished, and nearby Robb's Lane were named for him
- The Robb Scholarship at Prince Alfred College was instituted in his memory.

== Family ==
John Robb married Elizabeth Stranger (c. 1840 – ) on 6 October 1858. They had thirteen children, of whom seven survived him:

- Arthur T. Robb, civil engineer with extensive contracts in Victoria
- William J. Robb, solicitor of Victoria
- John Robb, sugar plantation manager in Queensland
- Mortimer Robb
- Maggie Robb married Charles Mortimer Muirhead, of Adelaide, on 11 October 1882
- Lizzie Victoria Robb married Alfred Dunn, architect of Melbourne, on 16 April 1890
- Miss Robb

Their home for many years was "Coonac", Clendon Road, Toorak.
