= Lowanna =

Lowanna may refer to:

- Lowanna, New South Wales, a village
- Lowanna College, in Newborough, Victoria, Australia

== See also ==
- Lowana
