= Thorpdale railway station =

Former railway station in Victoria, Australia

Thorpdale

General information
- Coordinates: 38°17′9.6″S 146°10′27.8″E
- Elevation: 243 m (797 ft)
- Line: Thorpdale
- Distance: 147.351 km from Flinders Street; 18.357 km from Moe
- Platforms: 1
- Tracks: 3

Other information
- Status: Closed

History
- Opened: 8 May 1888
- Closed: 3 December 1958
- Former names: Warrington (until 1 July 1888)

Services
Preceding station	Disused railways	Following station
Narracan	Thorpdale line	Terminus
List of closed railway stations in Victoria
Location
- Location within Baw Baw Shire

Thorpdale Railway Station was located in Thorpdale, Victoria and was the terminus of the Thorpdale railway line.

== History ==
Thorpdale Railway Station was opened on Tuesday 8 May 1888 as Warrington and renamed Thorpdale on 1 July 1888. It closed on 3 December 1958. Little evidence remains of the station itself.

== Facilities ==
Apart from a passenger platform, the station yard included; a 50 ft (15 m) turntable, sheep and cattle yards, a 6 long tons (6.1 t) crane, and a goods platform.
