= Desi-Rae Young =

American basketball player

Personal information
- Born: January 8, 2002 (age 24) Inglewood, California, U.S.
- Listed height: 6 ft 1 in (1.85 m)

Career information
- High school: Desert Oasis (Las Vegas, Nevada)
- College: UNLV Lady Rebels (2020–2024)
- Position: Center
- Number: 23

Career highlights
- 2× Mountain West Player of the Year (2022, 2024); MWC Tournament MVP (2023); 3× First-team All-Mountain West (2022–2024); 3× Mountain West All-Defensive Team (2022–2024); Mountain West Freshman of the Year (2021); Mountain West All-Freshman Team (2021); Academic All-Mountain West Team (Spring 2021)
- Stats at Basketball Reference

Desi-Rae Yvonne Young (born January 8, 2002) is an American professional basketball player who is a free agent. Young attended the University of Nevada, Las Vegas (UNLV), where she played center on the UNLV Lady Rebels basketball team and studies Social Work.

== Personal and early life ==
Young, born in Inglewood, California is the daughter of Beverly Williams and has two siblings – older brother, Omar Paul, and younger sister, Rashida Young. At age 3, Young and her family moved from Inglewood to Las Vegas, Nevada. At age 12, at the encouragement of her uncle, Young began playing basketball. As a child, Young and her AAU basketball team attended camps hosted by the UNLV Lady Rebels basketball program.

== High school career ==
Young attended Desert Oasis High School (Diamondbacks), where she played on the girls basketball team, in Las Vegas. In 24 games as a sophomore on the 2017-2018 Diamondbacks girls basketball team, Young, a 6’0”, 131-lb power forward and center, led the team in points (263), points per game (11), points per shot (1.6), rebounds per game (6.6 rebounds), field goals made (97), field goal percentage (60%), free throws attempted (132), and double doubles (6). Young led the 2017-2018 Diamondbacks to a 21-5 record, the #4 team ranking in Nevada, the championship game of the Nike Interstate Shootout in Oregon, and to the semifinals of the Sunset Region tournament. Young’s sophomore performance earned her Nevada All-State Team Honorable Mention, All-Southwest League Second Team, and Athlete of the Week honors (January 8-13, 2018), per the Las Vegas Review-Journal.

Entering Young’s junior season, the Las Vegas Sun selected Young to its preseason “Super Seven” Team, as one of the best girls basketball players in the Las Vegas area. Prior to the start of her junior season, Young had already received a scholarship offer from UNLV to play basketball. As a junior, Young led the 2018-2019 Diamondbacks in rebounds (89), rebounds per game (6.8), field goals made (58), field goal percentage (59%), free throws attempted (71), steals-to-turnover ratio (1.6), charges taken (4), and double doubles (3). Young led the Diamondbacks to a 20-6 record, Southwest League championship, the Diamondbacks program’s first-ever qualification for the 4A state tournament, a trip to the 4A semifinals (loss to Centennial High School), and another #4 Nevada state ranking. Young’s junior performance earned her All-Southwest League MVP honors.

Entering Young’s senior season, the Las Vegas Sun again selected Young to its preseason “Super Seven” Team, describing Young as both a “once-in-a-generation player” and a “once-in-a-generation teammate”. As a senior, now 6’1” and 165lbs, Young led the 2019-2020 Diamondbacks in points (356), points per game (13.7), points per shot (tied, 1.5), field goals made (356), field goal percentage (64%), free throws made (56), free throws attempted (98), rebounds (186), rebounds per game (7.2), blocks (18), blocks per game (0.7), charges taken (7), and double doubles (tied, 4).

As a senior, Young led the Diamondbacks to a 24-3 record, a Desert Region Championship, a runner up finish in Desert Oasis’ first-ever program trip to the 4A state finals (79-51 championship game loss to Centennial High School), #2 Nevada state ranking, and #219 national ranking. Following the state finals loss, in which Young spent significant time on the bench in foul trouble before ultimately fouling out with 7:31 left in the game, her Desert Oasis coach, Laurie Evans, said, “Desi-Rae is a powerhouse. There aren’t a lot of people who can guard her in the state. With her in foul trouble, it was just tough.” Young’s senior performance earned her First Team Nevada All-State Team and Southwest League Co-MVP honors.

Young finished her Desert Oasis High School career with per game averages of 11.4 points, 6.8 rebounds and 2.5 steals.

== College career ==
As a high school prospect, Young was lightly recruited, only receiving two Division I college scholarship offers, from which she committed to UNLV over Pepperdine.

=== 2020–2021 ===
Entering Young's 2020-2021 freshman season at UNLV, the Lady Rebels were picked to finish 9th in the Mountain West Conference as they returned only one starter from the prior season’s 9-9 conference record campaign as well as a new coach, Lindy La Rocque. Despite these lowly expectations, the Lady Rebels, powered in part by Young’s freshman performance, finished the regular season 15-8 (13-5 in Conference), earning the 2nd seed in the Mountain West Conference tournament, one of only three top-2 Conference finishes in Lady Rebel program history. Young scored the game-winning basket against Fresno State on 2/27/21 to clinch second place in the Conference for the Lady Rebels. However, Young and the Lady Rebels’ season ended with a 72-56 upset loss to 7-seed Wyoming in the quarterfinals of the Mountain West tournament, despite Young’s team-leading 21 points and 70% field goal percentage, which earned her “Lady Rebel of the Game” honors.

In 24 games (21 starts) as a freshman center for the Lady Rebels, Young, a previously unranked recruit coming out of high school, led all Mountain West Conference freshmen in scoring (12.7 points per game) (11th overall in Conference, first on team) and rebounding (6.9 per game) (8th overall in Conference, 2nd on team). In the Conference, Young tied for the most double doubles (5), finished 6th in scoring (304 points) (1st on team) and 7th in rebounding (158) (2nd on team). Young also led her team in field goal percentage (51.1%), field goals made (112), free throws made (80), free throws attempted (134), and offensive rebounds (61).

Young’s freshman performance earned her Mountain West Conference Freshman of the Year, Mountain West Conference All-Freshman Team, Mountain West All-Conference Team Honorable Mention, Week 14 NCAA.com “Starting Five” (top 5 players of the week in NCAA women’s basketball), and Mountain West Conference Women’s Basketball Player of the Week (February 15-21, 2021) honors. In the classroom, Young earned Spring 2021 Academic All-Mountain West Team honors with a 3.12 GPA in her Social Work studies (after changing her major from Journalism and Media).

=== 2021–2022 ===
Entering her sophomore season, Young was recognized as a preseason All-Mountain West Conference First Team selection.

During the 2021-22 season, she was named the Mountain West Player of the Week three times - November 15; December 27; and January 24. She led UNLV to the program's first ever outright regular season Mountain West title, followed shortly thereafter by the Lady Rebels' first Mountain West Conference women's basketball tournament championship in program history with the help of Young's 14 points and seven rebounds in the Mountain West Championship against Colorado State. By winning the conference tournament, the Lady Rebels earned an automatic bid to the 2022 Women's NCAA tournament. In 13-seed UNLV's first round NCAA Tournament game against 4-seed Arizona, Young led the team in scoring and posted a double-double with 16 points and 11 rebounds as the underdog Lady Rebels' led after three quarters before ultimately losing 72-67 to the Wildcats.

In 33 games as a sophomore, Young posted per game averages of 15.2 points (6th in Mountain West), 55.3% field goal percentage, 8.5 rebounds (5th in Mountain West), 1.8 assists, 0.5 blocks, and 0.9 steals, as well as twelve double-doubles and scored double-digits in all but one of the Lady Rebels' games. Her season performance earned her Mountain West Conference Player of the Year and All-Mountain West First Team honors, and her Mountain West tournament performance earned her All-Tournament Team recognition, along with teammates Essence Booker (Tournament MVP) and Nneka Obiazor. She became the first Lady Rebel to win Mountain West Player of the Year in 20 years (Linda Fröhlich, 2002).

== Career statistics ==
Legend
GP	Games played	GS	Games started	MPG	Minutes per game	RPG	Rebounds per game
APG	Assists per game	SPG	Steals per game	BPG	Blocks per game	PPG	Points per game
TO	Turnovers per game	FG%	Field-goal percentage	3P%	3-point field-goal percentage	FT%	Free-throw percentage
**Bold**	Career best	°	League leader

=== College ===
Year	Team	GP	GS	MPG	FG%	3P%	FT%	RPG	APG	SPG	BPG	TO	PPG
2020–21	UNLV	24	21	22.4	51.1	0.0	59.7	6.6	0.7	0.8	0.3	2.3	12.7
2021–22	UNLV	33	32	25.5	55.3	0.0	66.7	8.5	1.8	0.9	0.5	3.2	15.2
2022–23	UNLV	**34**	**34**	**30.7**	**59.2**	**33.3**	**73.1**	**10.1**	**2.1**	**1.5**	0.5	2.5	17.9
2023–24	UNLV	33	33	28.8	56.8	29.4	68.4	9.1	2.2	1.3	0.4	2.3	**18.3**
**Career**		124	120	27.2	56.2	28.9	67.3	8.7	1.8	1.2	0.4	2.6	16.3
Statistics retrieved from Sports-Reference.
