= Tony Kontellis =

Greek-Australian professional wrestler

Personal information
- Born: Antonios Kontellis; June 24, 1936 Lesbos, North Aegean, Greece

Professional wrestling career
- Ring name: Tony Kontellis
- Billed height: 5 ft 9 in (1.75 m)
- Debut: c. 1960
- Retired: c. 1975

Antonios "Tony" Kontellis (Greek: Αντώνιος Κοντέλλης; born June 24, 1936), is a Greek-Australian former professional wrestler. Kontellis has worked for many wrestling promotions throughout his career, including WCW Australia and WWWF for Vince McMahon Sr.

== Career ==
Kontellis participated in the Greek team for the 1956 Summer Olympics in Melbourne, Australia but a training injury forced him to withdraw. Travelling to South Australia to visit relatives, he was convinced to enter professional wrestling by a local wrestler. He was training in a gym when he was noticed by a visiting American wrestler, Lou Newman, who served as a mentor during Kontellis's early career. In 1957, Kontellis teamed with Norm Ryan to compete for the vacant Australian Tag Team Championship. They faced Jon and Frank Morro to determine the new champions but were unable to win the title belts.

In 1960, he travelled to Pakistan and feuded with King Kong Czaja before moving on to Canada. Whilst in Toronto, Ontario, Canada Kontellis wrestled for Frank Tunney's Maple Leaf Wrestling promotion. In 1966, Tony Kontellis returned to Australia and New Zealand, facing such wrestlers as Czaja, The Great Zorro, Wadi Ayoub and Steve Rickard.

In 1972, while in the WWWF, Kontellis wrestled opponents such as Joe Nova, Fred Curry and Jimmy Valiant. In 1974, Kontellis defeated Don Carson, Bill Dundee, Mr. Moto and Les Thornton while competing in Australia. He also won the Australasian Tag Team titles on 5 April with Pat Barrett by defeating George Barnes and Bobby Shane in a tournament final. Two weeks later, they dropped the title to Shane and Mr. Wrestling.

In 2003, Kontellis became a trainer for the World Wrestling Alliance wrestling school in Cabramatta, Sydney along with his son Paul and Libnan Ayoub. In 2007, Kontellis discontinued the school, and now resides in Sydney.

== Championships and accomplishments ==
- World Championship Wrestling (Australia)
  - NWA Austra-Asian Tag Team Championship - with Pat Barrett
  - Oriental Heavyweight Championship
