= Pat Barrett (wrestler) =

Irish professional wrestler (1936–2021)

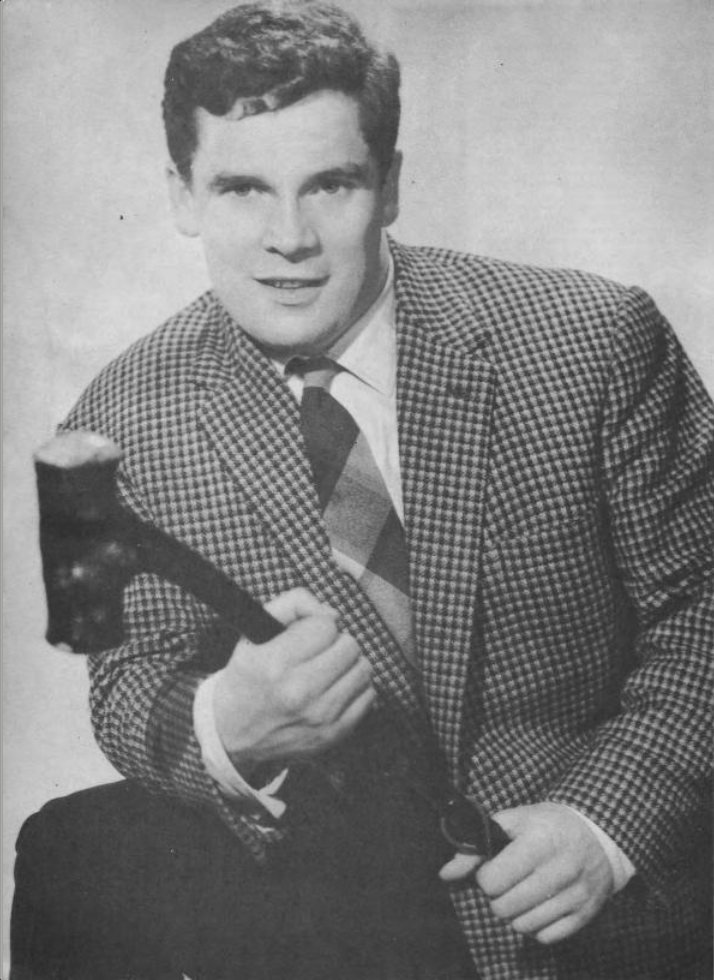
- Barrett, c. 1963

Personal information
- Born: Ivor Anthony Patrick Barrett; 11 March 1936 Dublin, Ireland
- Died: 28 November 2021 (aged 85) Dublin, Ireland

Professional wrestling career
- Ring name(s): Pat Barrett; Paddy Barrett; Ivor Barrett; Bonecrusher Barrett; Mr. Wrestling
- Debut: 1960
- Retired: 1987

Ivor Anthony Patrick Barrett (11 March 1936 – 28 November 2021), known as Pat Barrett, was an Irish professional wrestler. During his career, which spanned from 1960 to the later-1980s, he wrestled in countries including Ireland, Australia, Canada, New Zealand, and the United States, appearing with promotions including the National Wrestling Alliance and the World Wide Wrestling Federation.

== Professional wrestling career ==
Barrett started wrestling in 1960 as Paddy Barrett in Ireland and in 1963, he joined the National Wrestling Alliance in the United States where he joined the sanctioned body of promotions in the U.S., National Wrestling Alliance. He also toured Canada where he created a successful tag team with Tim Geoghegan. Barrett and Geoghegan defeated Art Nelson and Ivan Kameroff on 8 November 1965 to win the NWA Canadian Tag Team Championship. They lost their title to John Tolos and Black Terror on 4 January 1966 but defeated them back for the title on 28 February 1966. After Barrett and Geoghegan disbanded their team, Barrett created a tag team with Don Leo Jonathan. On 22 July 1968, they defeated Abdullah the Butcher and Armand Hussain to win the NWA Canadian Tag Team Championship. After the pair separated, Barrett forged a singles career, and feuded with both Jonathan and Geoghegan.

In 1974, he toured Australia where he created a gimmick of "Mr. Wrestling" and was sometimes known as "Mr. Wrestling of Australia". On 5 April 1974, he won a tag team tournament with Tony Kontellis and won the NWA Austra-Asian Tag Team Championship.

In 1975, he joined World Wide Wrestling Federation under his real name. He battled Bruno Sammartino on 15 May 1975 for the WWWF World Heavyweight Championship, but lost by count-out. In June 1975, Victor Rivera left WWWF while being the WWWF Tag Team Champion with Dominic DeNucci. De Nucci chose Barrett as his replacement partner. De Nucci and Barrett lost the title to The Blackjacks on 26 August 1975.

He returned to NWA in 1975 and started his second stint with NWA. On 15 August 1977, Pat Barrett and Norvell Austin defeated Jerry Brown and Buddy Roberts to win the NWA Mid-America Tag Team Championship. They re-lost the title to Jerry Brown and Buddy Roberts on 22 August. On 25 September, they defeated once again Jerry Brown and Buddy Roberts to win the NWA-Mid American Tag Team Championship for a second time. In 1979, he joined the Los Angeles-based NWA Hollywood Wrestling, and on 8 August, Barrett defeated Bull Ramos to win the NWA Americas Heavyweight Championship. As the NWA Americas Heavyweight Champion, he feuded with Bull Ramos, Walter Johnson, Chavo Guerrero, Johnny Mantell, Roddy Piper, Ron Starr, and Pat Patterson. In November, he lost the title to Patterson.

In late 1979, he left NWA Hollywood Wrestling to tour the Pacific Islands. On 2 January 1980, Barrett unsuccessfully challenged Lee Osbourne for the World Junior Heavyweight Championship but won a rematch for the title a week later. On 15 April 1980, he defeated Kerry Garvin to win the Pacific Area Heavyweight Championship. He feuded with Kerry Garvin and Lee Osbourne and defended his title against several wrestlers on the Pacific Islands. In 1981, Barrett toured New Zealand. He created a tag team with the popular New Zealand wrestling star Pat O'Connor. He then formed a team with John Istaz and won the New Zealand Tag Team Championship.

In 1984, he made his way to Northern Ireland. He went on to win the Irish Heavyweight Championship and defended it against Irish wrestlers. He also appeared in the United Kingdom in for All Star Wrestling's 1985-1986 TV show on satellite channel Screensport.

In 1985, Barrett retired and became a trainer. On 27 August 2006, Pat Barrett made an appearance for the promotion Irish Whip Wrestling's show which was being held in Dublin, Ireland.

In the 1990s he penned an autobiographical book called "Everybody Down Here Hates Me", which recounts real life stories from his wrestling career.

In 2021, Pat Barrett died in Dublin where he was living at the time.

== Championships and accomplishments ==
- Continental Wrestling Association
  - AWA Southern Tag Team Championship (2 times) – with Norvell Ausin
- National Wrestling Alliance
  - NWA World Junior Heavyweight Championship (1 time)
- NWA All-Star Wrestling
  - NWA Canadian Tag Team Championship (Vancouver version) (3 times) – with Tom Geohagen (2) and Don Leo Jonathan (1)
- NWA Hollywood Wrestling
  - NWA Americas Heavyweight Championship (1 time)
- World Championship Wrestling (Australia)^{1}
  - NWA Austra-Asian Tag Team Championship (1 time) – with Tony Kontellis
- World Wide Wrestling Federation
  - WWWF World Tag Team Championship (1 time) – with Dominic DeNucci
- Other Titles
  - Irish Heavyweight Championship (1 time)
  - New Zealand Tag Team Championship (1 time) – with John Istaz
  - Pacific Area Heavyweight Championship (1 time)
  - Pacific World Junior Heavyweight Championship (1 time)

^{1}This promotion shouldn't be confused with World Championship Wrestling, a promotion once owned by Ted Turner and later sold to World Wrestling Entertainment in 2001.
