= Alex Sheedy =

Australian basketball player

No. 10 – Fresno State Bulldogs
- Position: Forward
- League: Mountain West Conference

Personal information
- Born: 17 November 1992 (age 33) Moe, Victoria, Australia
- Listed height: 6 ft 1 in (1.85 m)

Career information
- College: Fresno State (2011–2015)

Career history
- 2010–2011: AIS

Career highlights
- MWC Player of the Year (2015)

Alex Kaitlin Sheedy (born 17 November 1992) is an Australian basketball player who played for Fresno State in the United States' NCAA. She competed for Australian Institute of Sport in the Women's National Basketball League (WNBL).

== Basketball ==
Sheedy played junior basketball in Moe, Victoria. She played for the Australian Institute of Sport in the Women's National Basketball League during the 2010/2011 season. She played in a 24 November 2010 loss to the Canberra Capitals. She was a member of Victoria Country's u-18 women's basketball team. As a member of the squad she competed at the 2008 national championships held in Ballarat, Victoria from 5 to 12 July.

=== Fresno State statistics ===
Legend
| GP | Games played | GS | Games started | MPG | Minutes per game |
| FG% | Field goal percentage | 3P% | 3-point field goal percentage | FT% | Free throw percentage |
| RPG | Rebounds per game | APG | Assists per game | SPG | Steals per game |
| BPG | Blocks per game | PPG | Points per game | **Bold** | Career high |

| Year | Team | GP | Points | FG% | 3P% | FT% | RPG | APG | SPG | BPG | PPG |
|---|---|---|---|---|---|---|---|---|---|---|---|
| 2011-12 | Fresno State | **34** | 226 | **44.7%** | 33.3% | 63.0% | 4.0 | 0.7 | 0.6 | 0.2 | 6.6 |
| 2012-13 | Fresno State | 33 | 343 | 39.5% | **35.8%** | 78.7% | 5.6 | 1.2 | 1.6 | 0.2 | 10.4 |
| 2013-14 | Fresno State | 23 | 293 | 37.9% | 26.9% | 75.0% | 6.1 | **1.5** | 1.2 | 0.3 | 12.7 |
| 2014-15 | Fresno State | 33 | **525** | 39.6% | 27.3% | **82.9%** | **7.1** | 1.5 | **1.6** | **0.4** | **15.9** |
| Career | | 123 | 1387 | 40.0% | 30.2% | 77.4% | 5.7 | 1.2 | 1.3 | 0.3 | 11.3 |
