= Doherty High School =

Thomas B. Doherty High School

Location
- 4418 Moonlight Dr; Colorado Springs, Colorado 80917; United States
- Coordinates: 38°53′45″N 104°44′38″W

Information
- Other names: Doherty High School, Doherty, DHS, The Bedia Home
- Type: Public high school
- Established: 1975 (51 years ago)
- School district: Colorado Springs 11
- CEEB code: 060296
- NCES School ID: 080306000268
- Principal: Hillary Hienton
- Teaching staff: 83.08 (on an FTE basis)
- Grades: 9–12
- Enrollment: 1,861 (2023-2024)
- Student to teacher ratio: 22.40
- Colors: Blue and green
- Athletics: CHSAA
- Mascot: Spartan
- Feeder schools: Jenkins Middle School; Russell Middle School; Sabin Middle School
- Website: www.d11.org/doherty

Thomas B. Doherty High School, commonly referred to as Doherty High School (DHS), is a public high school in Colorado Springs, Colorado, United States. Established in 1975, it is the newest school in the Colorado Springs School District 11, serving northeast Colorado Springs. The school was named for the District 11 superintendent at the time, Thomas Bernard Doherty. The schools that feed into Doherty include Jenkins, Russell and Sabin Middle Schools.

The school's colors are blue and green, and the mascot is the Spartan.

== Extracurriculars ==
=== Athletics ===
Doherty High School operates a variety of athletic programs. The facility is home to two gyms, two practice football fields, a soccer field, a baseball field, a softball field, a swimming pool, and a wrestling room. Doherty plays its Varsity and JV homes games for football, Varsity men's and women's soccer at Gary Berry Stadium located near Wasson High School.

== Notable alumni ==
- Tony Alford, football coach
- Ambrosia Anderson, WNBA player
- Adam Goucher, cross-country runner
- Mary Beth Heffernan, Los Angeles-based artist
- Lamarr Houston, NFL Chicago Bears player
- Mark Huismann, Major League Baseball pitcher
- Haleigh Washington, United States women's national volleyball team member and professional volleyball player
