= Mountain West Conference Women's Basketball Player of the Year =

- Awarded for: Most outstanding basketball player in the Mountain West Conference
- Country: United States

History
- First award: 2000
- Most recent: Nala Williams, San Diego State

The Mountain West Conference Women's Basketball Player of the Year is a basketball award given to the Mountain West Conference's (MW) most outstanding player. The award was first given following the 1999–2000 season, the first of the conference's existence. As of 2024–25, no MW player has received any national player of the year award.

Utah has the most awards with eight and individual recipients with five, but the Utes left the MW in 2011 to join what is now the Pac-12 Conference. Among current members, UNLV has the most awards with five, and shares honors with Colorado State for the most individual recipients with three. Two players have shared the award on five occasions—in 2001, consecutively from 2005 to 2007, and also in 2015. Four players have won the award more than once. Desi-Rae Young of UNLV won in 2022 and 2024; Ellen Nystrom of Colorado State won in 2016 and 2017; Linda Fröhlich of UNLV won the award outright in 2000 and 2002 and shared it in 2001; and Kim Gaucher (née Smith) of Utah won four times—outright in 2003 and 2004, and shared in 2005 and 2006.

== Key ==
†	Co-Players of the Year
*	Awarded a national player of the year award that same season: the Naismith College Player of the Year, Wade Trophy or the John R. Wooden Award
Player (X)	Denotes the number of times the player has been awarded the Mountain West Player of the Year award at that point

== Winners ==
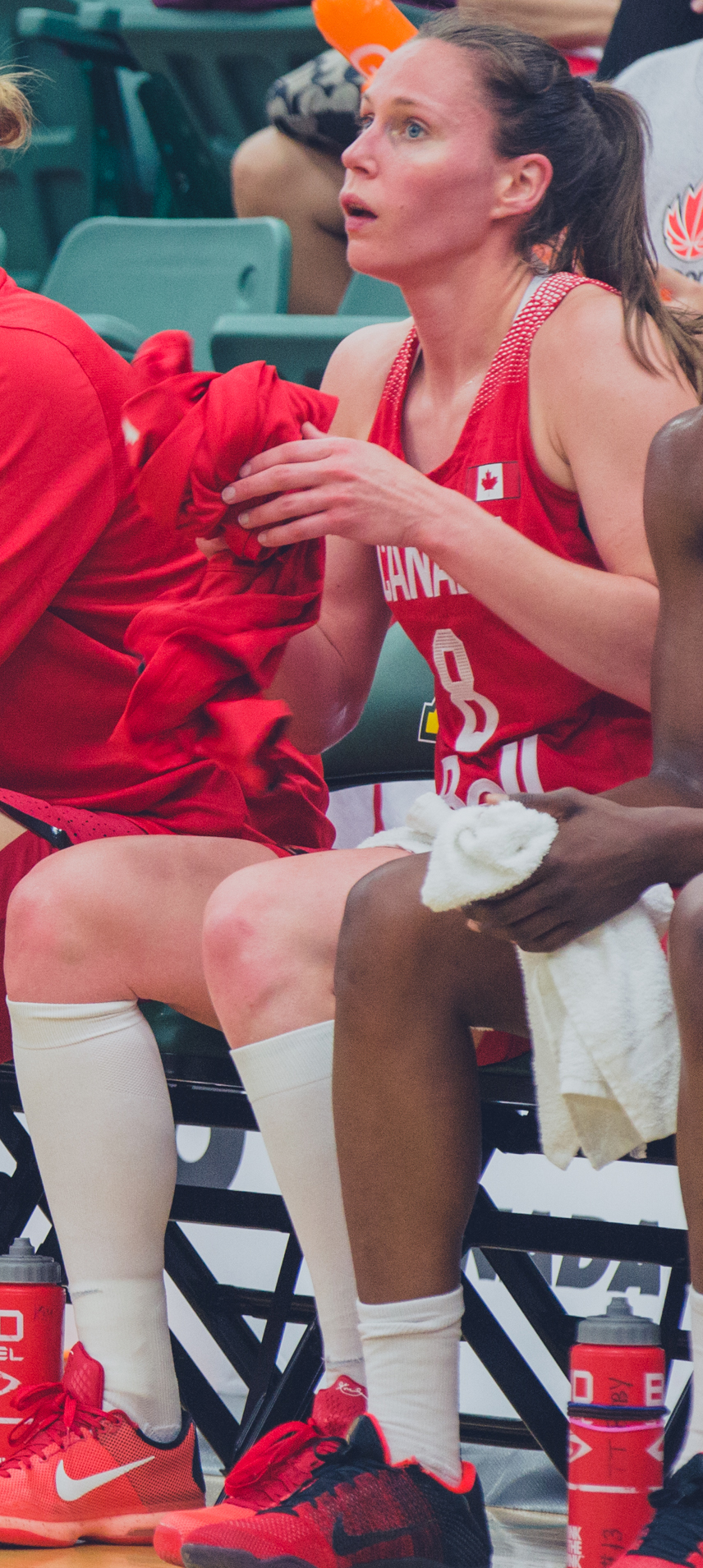
Kim Gaucher, née Smith, is the only four-time recipient.

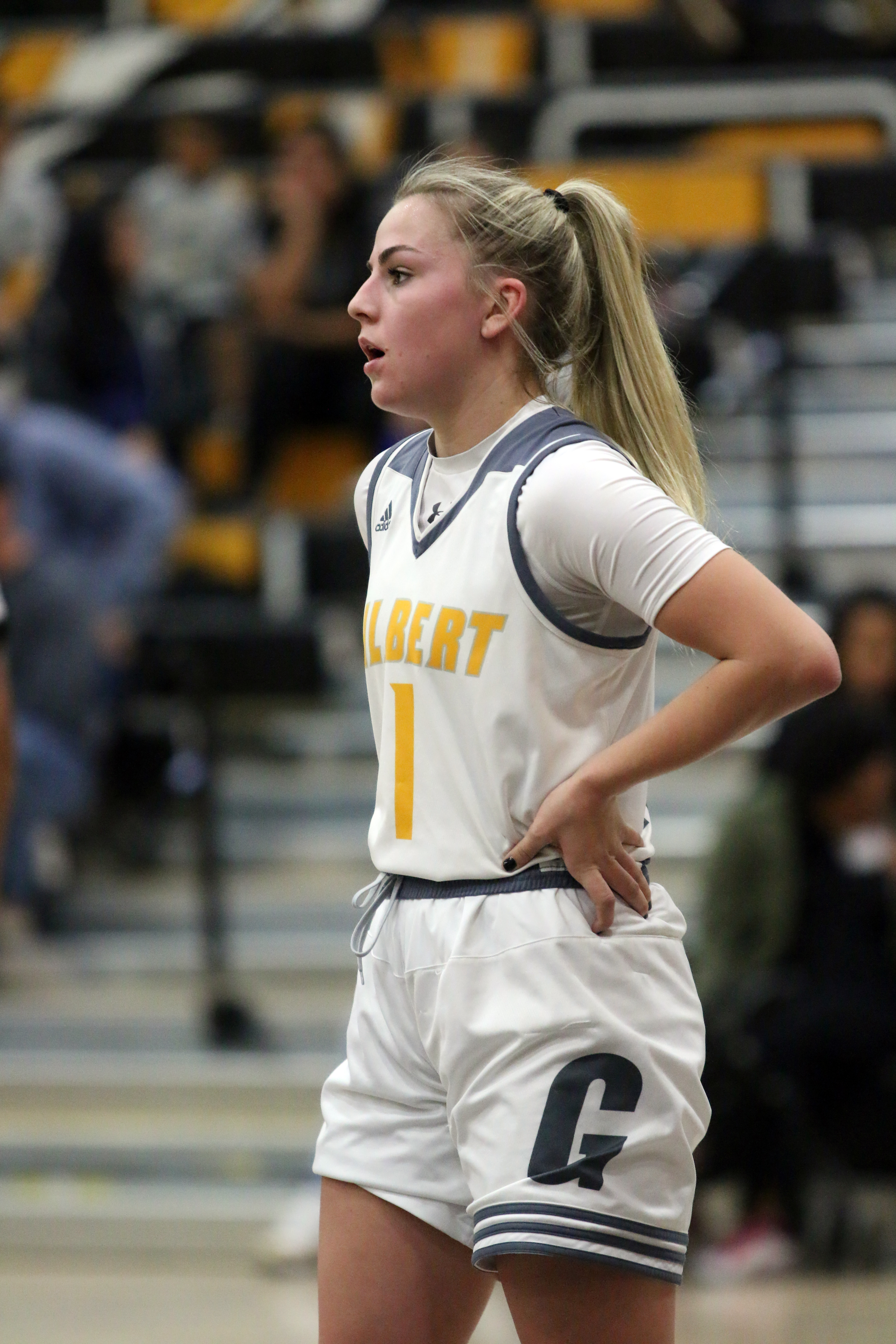
2021 recipient Haley Cavinder, pictured in high school.

Season	Player	School	Position	Class	Reference (Note: Except as indicated otherwise, all references are from the 2020–21 MW women's basketball record book, cited in the "References" section.)
1999–00	Linda Fröhlich	UNLV	F	Sophomore	
2000–01^{†}	Amy Ewert	Utah	G/F	Senior	
2000–01^{†}	Linda Fröhlich (2)	UNLV	F	Junior	
2001–02	Linda Fröhlich (3)	UNLV	F	Senior	
2002–03	Kim Smith	Utah	F	Freshman	
2003–04	Kim Smith (2)	Utah	F	Sophomore	
2004–05^{†}	Kim Smith (3)	Utah	F	Junior	
2004–05^{†}	Shona Thorburn	Utah	G	Junior	
2005–06^{†}	Ambrosia Anderson	BYU	F	Senior	
2005–06^{†}	Kim Smith (4)	Utah	F	Senior	
2006–07^{†}	Dani Kubik-Wright	BYU	C	Senior	
2006–07^{†}	Adrianne Ross	TCU	G	Junior	
2007–08	Leilani Mitchell	Utah	G	Senior	
2008–09	Morgan Warburton	Utah	G	Senior	
2009–10	Helena Sverrisdóttir	TCU	G/F	Junior	
2010–11	Aubrey Vandiver	Wyoming	G	Senior	
2011–12	Courtney Clements	San Diego State	G	Junior	
2012–13	Chelsea Hopkins	San Diego State	G	Senior	
2013–14	Jennifer Schlott	Utah State	G	Senior	
2014–15^{†}	Gritt Ryder	Colorado State	G	Senior	
2014–15^{†}	Alex Sheedy	Fresno State	F	Senior	
2015–16	Ellen Nystrom	Colorado State	G	Junior	
2016–17	Ellen Nystrom (2)	Colorado State	G	Senior	
2017–18	Liv Roberts	Wyoming	G	Senior	
2018–19	Jaisa Nunn	New Mexico	C	Senior	
2019–20	Maddi Utti	Fresno State	F	Junior	
2020–21	Haley Cavinder	Fresno State	G	Sophomore	
2021–22	Desi-Rae Young	UNLV	C	Sophomore	
2022–23	McKenna Hofschild	Colorado State	G	Senior	
2023–24	Desi-Rae Young (2)	UNLV	C	Senior	
2024–25	Allyson Fertig	Wyoming	C	Senior	
2025–26	Nala Williams	San Diego State	G	Senior	

== Winners by school ==
School (year joined)	Winners	Years
Utah (1999) (Note: Utah left in 2011 to join what is now the Pac-12 Conference, and moved from there to the Big 12 Conference in 2024.)	8	2001^{†}, 2003, 2004, 2005 (×2)^{†}, 2006^{†}, 2008, 2009
UNLV (1999)	5	2000, 2001^{†}, 2002, 2022, 2024
Colorado State (1999) (Note: Boise State, Colorado State, Fresno State, San Diego State, and Utah State will leave in 2026 for the Pac-12 Conference.)	4	2015^{†}, 2016, 2017, 2023
BYU (1999) (Note: BYU left in 2011 to join the West Coast Conference, and moved from there to the Big 12 in 2023.)	3	2003, 2006^{†}, 2007^{†}
Fresno State (2012)	3	2015^{†}, 2020, 2021
San Diego State (1999)	3	2012, 2013, 2026
Wyoming (1999)	3	2011, 2018, 2025
TCU (2005) (Note: TCU left in 2012 to join the Big 12.)	2	2007^{†}, 2010
Utah State (2013)	1	2014
New Mexico (1999)	1	2019
Air Force (1999)	0	—
Boise State (2011)	0	—
Grand Canyon (2025)	0	—
Nevada (2012)	0	—
San Jose State (2013)	0	—
