= Tony Alford =

American football player and coach (born 1968)

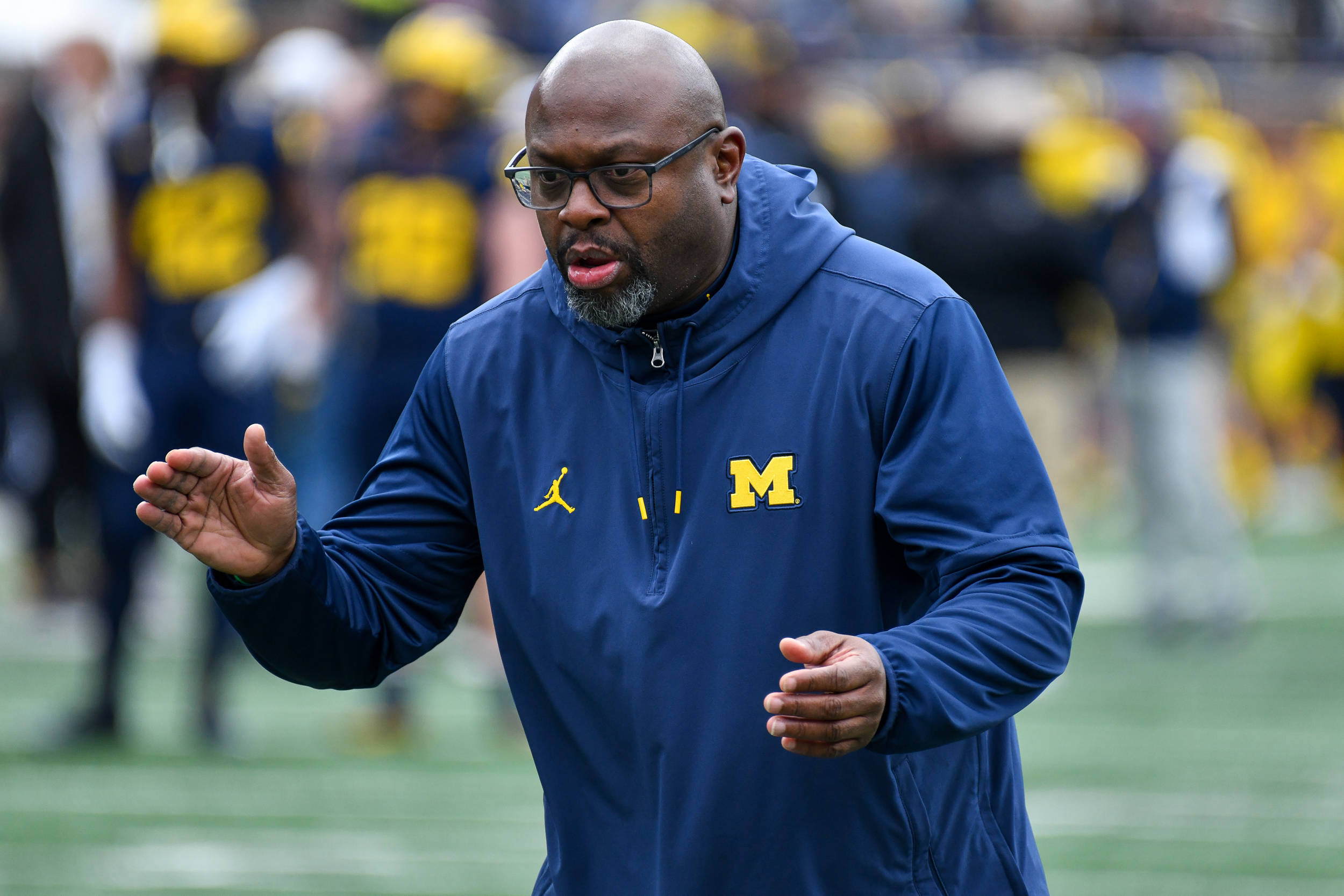
- Alford with the Michigan Wolverines in 2024

Current position
- Title: Running backs coach & run game coordinator
- Team: Michigan
- Conference: Big Ten

Biographical details
- Born: November 27, 1968 (age 57); Akron, Ohio, U.S.

Playing career
- 1987–1990: Colorado State
- Position: Running back

Coaching career (HC unless noted)
- 1993: Fort Collins HS (CO) (assistant)
- 1994: Lake Wales HS (FL) (assistant)
- 1995: Mount Union (RB)
- 1996: Kent State (RB)
- 1997–2000: Iowa State (RB)
- 2001: Washington (RB)
- 2002–2006: Iowa State (AHC/RB)
- 2007–2008: Louisville (RB)
- 2009: Notre Dame (RB)
- 2010–2011: Notre Dame (WR)
- 2012–2013: Notre Dame (RB/slot/recruiting)
- 2014: Notre Dame (RB/recruiting)
- 2015–2021: Ohio State (AHC/RB)
- 2022–2023: Ohio State (AHC/RGC/RB)
- 2024–present: Michigan (RB/RGC)

Accomplishments and honors

Awards
- First-team All-WAC (1989); Honorable mention All-American - USA Today (1989); Doak Walker Award nominee (1990)

Tony Alford (born November 27, 1968) is an American college football coach. He is the running backs coach and run game coordinator for the University of Michigan, positions he has held since 2024. Alford has served as an assistant college football coach throughout the Midwest for over 30 years, including at Notre Dame and Ohio State, before coaching the Michigan Wolverines.

== Playing career ==
Alford graduated from Doherty High School in Colorado Springs, Colorado after moving to the area his Senior year from Kent, Ohio. He went on to play for Colorado State from 1987 to 1990. He was a 1,000-yard rusher and a Doak Walker Award nominee at Colorado State. He gained 1,035 yards in 1989 as a junior under first-year Rams coach Earle Bruce. Alford was named first-team all-Western Athletic Conference that season and honorable mention All-America by USA Today.

Following his graduation, Alford was on the preseason squad for the Denver Broncos of the National Football League (NFL) and for the Birmingham Fire of the World League of American Football (WLAF).

== Coaching career ==
Alford has a long history of coaching success under several top coaches. He has worked under Dan McCarney, Steve Kragthorpe, Rick Neuheisel, Charlie Weis, Brian Kelly, Urban Meyer, Ryan Day, Sherrone Moore, and Kyle Whittingham.

He has coached several successful players including J. K. Dobbins, Ezekiel Elliott, Mike Weber, Michael Floyd and Victor Anderson.

Alford was a 247Sports.com finalist for national recruiter of the year in 2011.

== Personal life ==
Alford is married to his wife Trina and has three sons, Rylan, Kyler and Braydon.
