= Lamarr Houston =

American football player (born 1987)

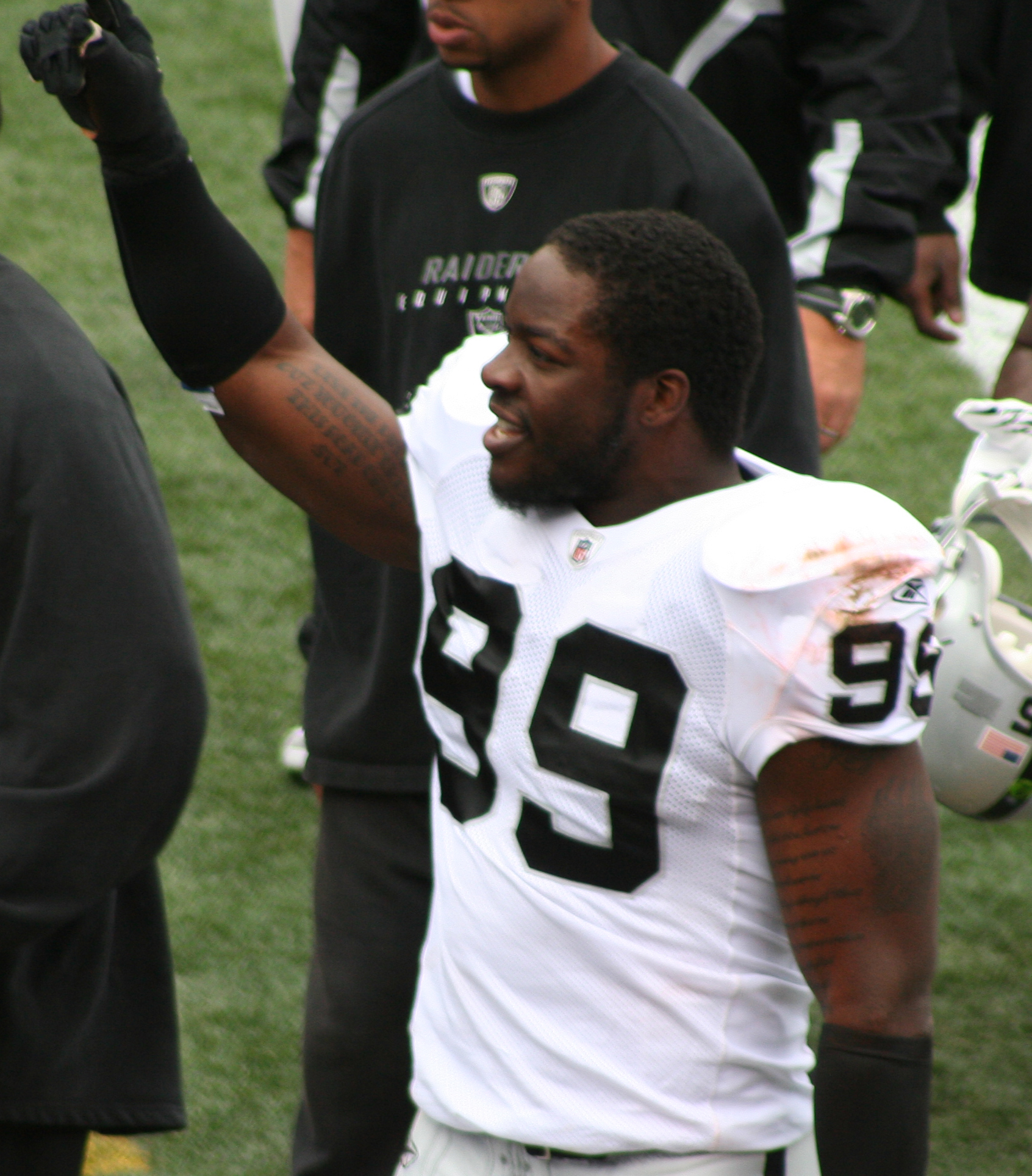
- Houston with the Oakland Raiders in 2010

No. 99, 58
- Position: Linebacker

Personal information
- Born: June 24, 1987 (age 39); San Francisco, California, U.S.
- Listed height: 6 ft 3 in (1.91 m)
- Listed weight: 274 lb (124 kg)

Career information
- High school: Doherty (Colorado Springs, Colorado)
- College: Texas
- NFL draft: 2010: 2nd round, 44th overall pick

Career history
- Oakland Raiders (2010–2013); Chicago Bears (2014–2016); Houston Texans (2017); Chicago Bears (2017)

Awards and highlights
- Second-team All-Big 12 (2009)

Career NFL statistics
- Total tackles: 302
- Sacks: 30.0
- Forced fumbles: 5
- Fumble recoveries: 9
- Interceptions: 1
- Defensive touchdowns: 1
- Stats at Pro Football Reference

Frederick Lamarr Houston (born June 24, 1987) is an American former professional football player who was a linebacker in the National Football League (NFL). He played college football for the Texas Longhorns and was selected by the Oakland Raiders in the second round of the 2010 NFL draft. Despite a promising start, Houston's NFL career was derailed by a series of knee injuries, including two anterior cruciate ligament (ACL) tears in 2014 and 2016, respectively.

== Early life ==
Houston attended Thomas B. Doherty High School in Colorado Springs, Colorado, where he was a letterman in football, basketball, and track. He played linebacker and running back. He finished his high school career with 3,325 rushing yards and 49 touchdowns as a running back and 239 tackles and 13 sacks as a linebacker.

In track and field, Houston competed in the throwing events. He got top-throws of 14.81 meters in the shot put and 48.31 meters in the discus throw.

Considered a four-star recruit by Rivals.com, Houston was rated as the sixth best strongside defensive end prospect of his class.

== College career ==
Houston started his college career at the University of Texas at Austin as a defensive end but switched to defensive tackle as a junior. During his career, he started 33 of 50 games, recording 133 tackles and 14 sacks. He recorded 10 tackles and a sack in the Longhorns loss to the Alabama Crimson Tide in the 2010 BCS National Championship Game.

== Professional career ==
Pre-draft measurables
Height	Weight	Arm length	Hand span	40-yard dash	10-yard split	20-yard split	20-yard shuttle	Three-cone drill	Vertical jump	Broad jump	Bench press
6 ft 2 3/4 in (1.90 m)	305 lb (138 kg)	33 in (0.84 m)	10 in (0.25 m)	4.89 s	1.73 s	2.85 s	4.71 s	7.61 s	33.5 in (0.85 m)	9 ft 6 in (2.90 m)	30 reps
All values from NFL Combine

=== Oakland Raiders ===
Houston was selected by the Oakland Raiders in the second round (44th overall) of the 2010 NFL draft, and started his rookie year at the left defensive end position.

On October 9, 2011, a day after the death of Raiders owner Al Davis, Houston recorded 3 tackles, 2 quarterback pressures, and intercepted a pass by Matt Schaub in a 25-20 victory over the Houston Texans.

On October 21, 2012, Houston recorded eight combined tackles, two tackles for losses, two quarterback hits, a sack, and a forced fumble in a 26-23 overtime victory against the Jacksonville Jaguars.

During the 2013 NFL season, Houston moved to right DE from left DE for the first time in his career.

During his Raiders tenure, Houston never missed a game.

=== Chicago Bears ===
On March 11, 2014, Houston and the Chicago Bears agreed to a five-year contract. The deal was worth $35 million, with $15 million guaranteed. On October 26, Houston tore his ACL while celebrating a sack of New England Patriots backup quarterback Jimmy Garoppolo, while the Bears were losing by 25 points. The incident was similar to linebacker Stephen Tulloch's, who also tore his ACL, while celebrating a sack earlier in the season.

In 2015, Houston moved to the linebacker position under new defensive coordinator Vic Fangio's 3–4 defense. As a linebacker, he recorded a career and team high eight sacks. He did not play much during the early portion of the season until Jared Allen was traded; he played only four snaps against the Minnesota Vikings, but recorded 28 tackles, five sacks and six TFLs in from week nine to fourteen. In the final nine games, he had seven sacks, the sixth-most in that stretch.

In 2016, in the second game of the season, Houston tore the ACL in his left knee during Monday Night Football against the Philadelphia Eagles. He was placed on injured reserve on September 22, 2016.

On September 2, 2017, Houston was placed on injured reserve with a knee injury. He was then released on September 6. Houston concluded his three-year tenure with the Bears with 70 tackles and nine sacks over 26 games.

=== Houston Texans ===
On October 11, 2017, Houston signed with the Houston Texans. During Week 9 against the Indianapolis Colts, Houston recovered a fumble, and ran in into the end zone for his first career touchdown in the 20-14 loss. On November 28, 2017, Houston was waived by the Texans.

=== Chicago Bears (second stint) ===
On November 29, 2017, Houston was claimed off waivers by the Bears. He appeared in five games and recorded four sacks during his second stint with the Bears.

In April 2018, Houston worked out with Raiders. He was not ultimately signed.

Houston signed a one-day contract to retire with the Raiders on February 12, 2020. On his retirement with the Raiders, he said "I really take pride in being one of the last hand-picked players by Al Davis. For that reason, I wanted to retire a Raider. Once a Raider always a Raider."

== NFL career statistics ==
Year	Team	Games		Tackles				Fumbles				Interceptions					
Year	Team	GP	GS	Cmb	Solo	Asr	Sck	FF	FR	Yds	TD	Int	Yds	Avg	Lng	TD	PD
2010	OAK	16	15	39	30	9	5.0	1	2	0	0	0	0	0.0	0	0	0
2011	OAK	16	13	51	36	15	1.0	0	2	0	0	1	15	15.0	15	0	3
2012	OAK	16	16	69	49	20	4.0	1	1	0	0	0	0	0.0	0	0	2
2013	OAK	16	16	69	56	13	6.0	2	1	0	0	0	0	0.0	0	0	0
2014	CHI	8	8	11	8	3	1.0	0	1	0	0	0	0	0.0	0	0	1
2015	CHI	16	2	42	36	6	8.0	0	1	0	0	0	0	0.0	0	0	0
2016	CHI	2	0	4	2	2	0.0	0	0	0	0	0	0	0.0	0	0	0
2017	HOU	5	0	7	6	1	1.0	1	1	34	1	0	0	0.0	0	0	0
2017	CHI	5	1	10	8	2	4.0	0	0	0	0	0	0	0.0	0	0	1
Total		100	71	302	231	71	30.0	5	9	34	1	1	15	15.0	15	0	7
