= Thorpdale =

- Town
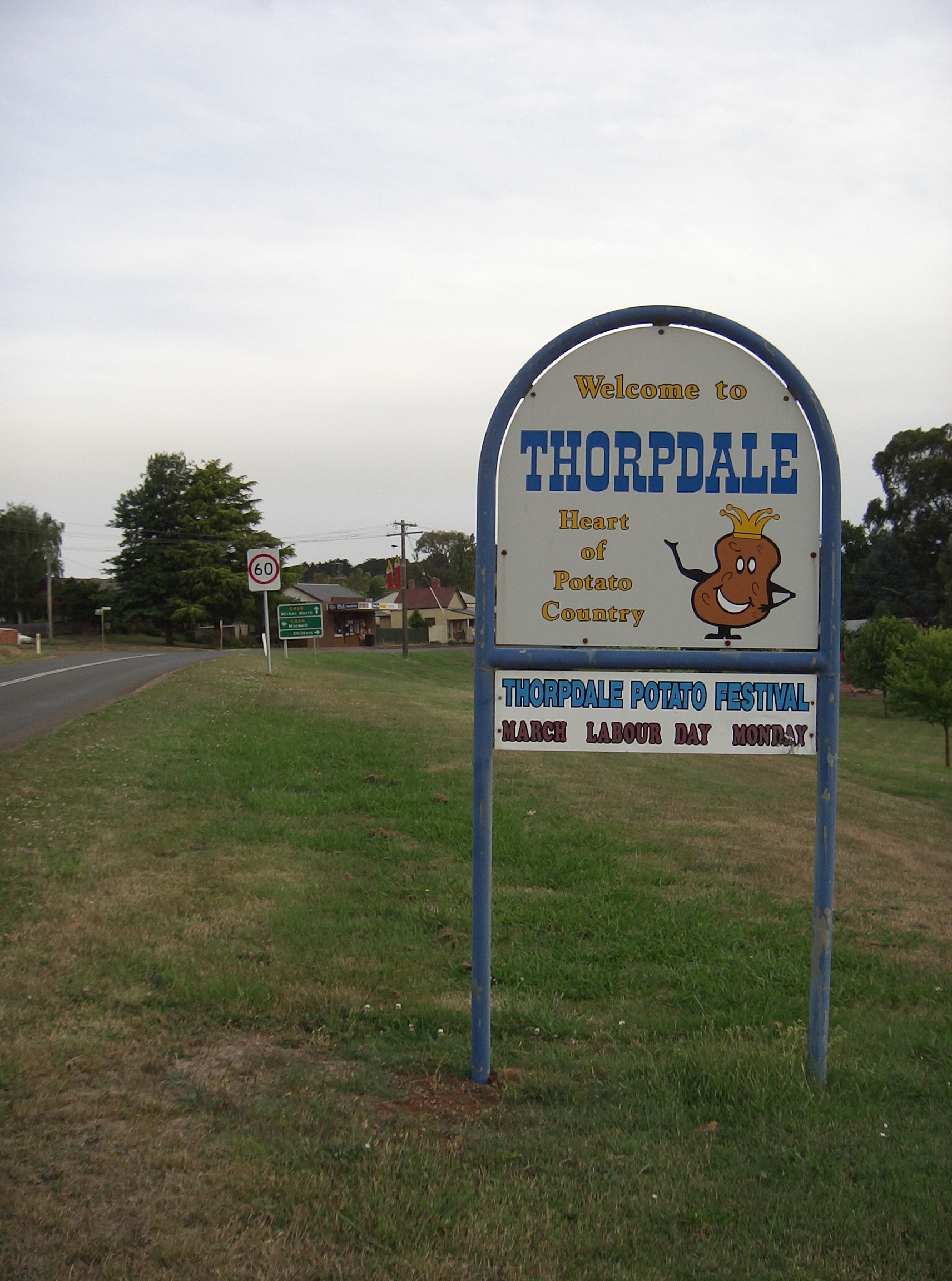
- "Welcome to Thorpdale - Heart of Potato Country"

- Coordinates: 38°17′0″S 146°10′0″E
- Country: Australia
- State: Victoria
- LGA: Shire of Baw Baw
- Location: 137 km (85 mi) SE of Melbourne; 23 km (14 mi) SW of Moe; 14 km (8.7 mi) SE of Trafalgar

Government
  - State electorate: Narracan
  - Federal division: Monash

Population
  - Total: 447 (2006 census)
- Postcode: 3835

Thorpdale is a town in the Gippsland area of eastern Victoria in the Shire of Baw Baw. Famous for its potatoes, it is located amongst the rich farmland of the Latrobe Valley. Thorpdale spuds are eaten around the country and also exported overseas. The name "Thorpdale" means "village in a valley". The soil in the area is particularly rich as the town is located in a former volcanic crater. It is administered by the Shire of Baw Baw. At the 2006 census, Thorpdale and the surrounding area had a population of 447.

== History ==
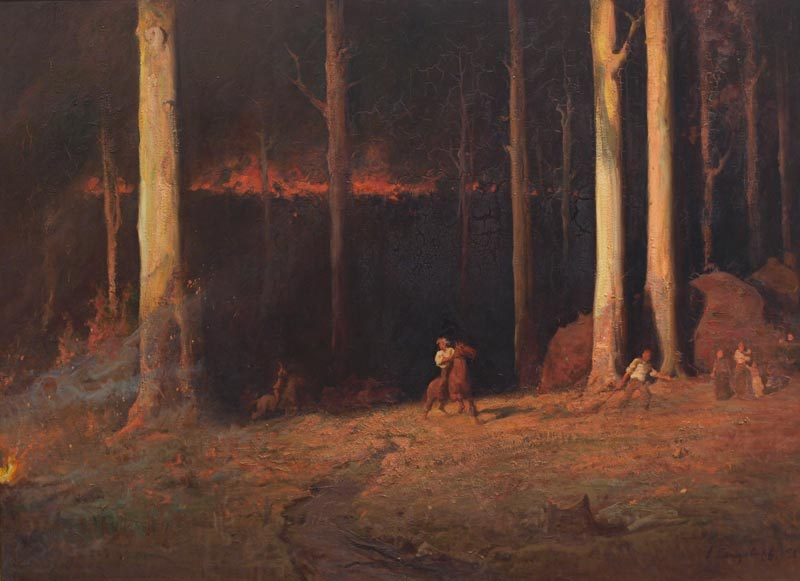
John Longstaff's Gippsland, Sunday night, February 20th, 1898

The Thorpdale district, known at first as the Narracan district, was settled by Europeans in the 1870s. The first European settlers arrived from the old Melbourne – Sale Road via McDonalds Track, a stock route that had been surveyed in 1862 through the hills from Lang Lang to Morwell Bridge, but which later became disused and very much overgrown. Land selection began at Narracan (near the eastern end of the track) in 1873, and progressed steadily along the track, reaching Narracan West in 1876.

A Post Office opened on 1 October 1879 as Narracan West. It was renamed Thorpdale in 1884, Thorpdale South in 1888, and closed in 1968. The present town of Thorpdale (situated about 2 km north of the old town) was founded in 1888, following the opening of a branch railway line from Moe. A new Thorpdale Post Office opened in 1888 near the railway station. The railway line closed in December 1958.

At its height, Thorpdale was a business centre for all the farming activity that surrounded it. Much of the old town was destroyed during the large Red Tuesday (20 January 1898) bushfire that ravaged Gippsland and the Otway Ranges.

== The Town today ==
Today, the Thorpdale township is becoming smaller and smaller as more farming families opt to live in larger townships such as Trafalgar. The national decline in consumption of potatoes is making even farming difficult in the small town.

The town has an Australian rules football team competing in the Mid Gippsland Football League.

== Potato farming ==
In late 2008, the town was hit by the news that a potato disease (potato cyst nematode) had been found among its crops. The disease is not harmful to humans but can significantly reduce crop yields. Thorpdale farms were quarantined and banned from exporting potatoes interstate and overseas. Interstate trade has since resumed.

== Attractions ==
The township holds the Thorpdale Potato Festival every second year on the Sunday before Victorian Labour Day holiday in March, although it was not held from 2002 to 2015, after the insurance cost became too great for the small community to bear. The festival features potato sack races, Historic machinery, eating contests, market stalls, and much more. The lush farming surrounds give the town a peaceful rural atmosphere and there are several scenic sights nearby, including the Narracan Falls, Trafalgar South Lookout and Henderson's Gully.
