= Allan Pinfold =

Australian professional wrestler (1929–2019)

Personal information
- Born: Johnny Gilday; 1929 Sydney, New South Wales, Australia
- Died: 2019 (aged 90)

Professional wrestling career
- Ring names: Allan Pinfold; Alan Pinfold; Allan Roy
- Billed height: 6 ft 2 in (1.88 m)
- Billed weight: 245 lb (111 kg)
- Debut: 1945
- Retired: 1975

Johnny Gilday (1929–2019) was an Australian weightlifter and professional wrestler and later on referee, best known under the ring name Allan Pinfold, sometimes spelled Alan Pinfold. He was an active wrestler from 1945 until 1975 when he retired and became a referee until 1985. During his 30-year career Pinfold won the Australian Light Heavyweight Championship three times in total and also won the Australian Tag Team Championship while teaming with Allan Sherry.

== Background ==
Johnny Gilday was born in 1929 in Sydney, Australia, where he also grew up. Growing up during the Great Depression in Australia the effects of poverty and bullying propelled him to join a gym and get physically fit as a bodybuilder. Later on he turned to wrestling instead to make money. All throughout his career Gilday held down a day job as well, working as an engineer. Being a fitter and turner by trade he supplemented his income over the years with his wrestling earnings. Gilday retired in 1975, suffering long term effects of his thirty-year career as all the injuries he sustained resulted in him developing severe arthritis in his later years. Pinfold died in 2019, at the age of 90.

== Professional wrestling career ==
After being trained by a wrestler he met in the gym Gilday took the ring name Allan Pinfold (also spelled "Alan Pinfold" at times) in 1943 making his debut against a wrestler called Chesty Bond. He became a regular of the recently established Australian Wrestling Federation that held most of their shows in the Leichhardt Stadium and covered large parts of the New South Wales state. In early 1953 Pinfold defeated Alf Greer to win the vacant Australian Light Heavyweight Championship as the AWF bookers decided to give him the championship. The following month he was forced to give up the championship as he decided to take an offer for an extended tour of India and Ceylon to wrestle. When he returned later that same year Pinfold was teamed up with Bud Cody to compete in a tournament to determine the first ever holders of the Australian Tag Team Championship. The duo lost to John Morrow and Sowy Dowton in the finals on 13 February 1954. In subsequent years Pinfold became the regular tag team partner of British wrestler Allan Sherry, starting a long running program against Morrow and Dowton. The tag team title pursuit was put on hold for several months as Sherry injured his knee. On 18 February 1956 Pinfold and Sherry defeated Morrow an Dowton to win the tag team championship. Their reign lasted all of one week before Bob George and Alf Greer won the championship. In 1960 the promoters decided to have Allan Pinfold win the Australian Light Heavyweight Championship for a second time, defeating Col Peters to win the title. The second reign lasted well over a year, until 13 January 1962 where wrestler El Greco defeated him for the championship. Late in his career, only one year before his retirement Allan Pinfold won the Australian Light Heavyweight Championship for a third time on 4 October 1974 as he defeated Ken Medlin for the championship more than 20 years after he won it for the first time. Medlin would defeat Pinfold a month later to end the third and final reign of Pinfold's career. In 1975 Pinfold retired from in ring competition and became a referee instead, working for various Sydney based wrestling promotions for approximately 10 years.

== Championships and accomplishments ==
- Australian Light Heavyweight Championship (3 time)
- Australian Tag Team Championship (1 time) - with Allan Sherry

== See also ==
- Professional wrestling in Australia
- List of professional wrestling organisations in Australia
- World Championship Wrestling (Australia)
