= Matt O'Hea =

Australian basketball player

Personal information
- Born: 3 September 1982 (age 43) Moe, Victoria, Australia
- Listed height: 196 cm (6 ft 5 in)
- Listed weight: 89 kg (196 lb)
- Position: Guard

Matt O'Hea (born 3 September 1982) is a former professional basketball player from Moe, Victoria. He played for the Melbourne Tigers in the NBL for four seasons, including two championships in 2006 and 2008.
