= Ambrosia Anderson =

American basketball player (born 1984)

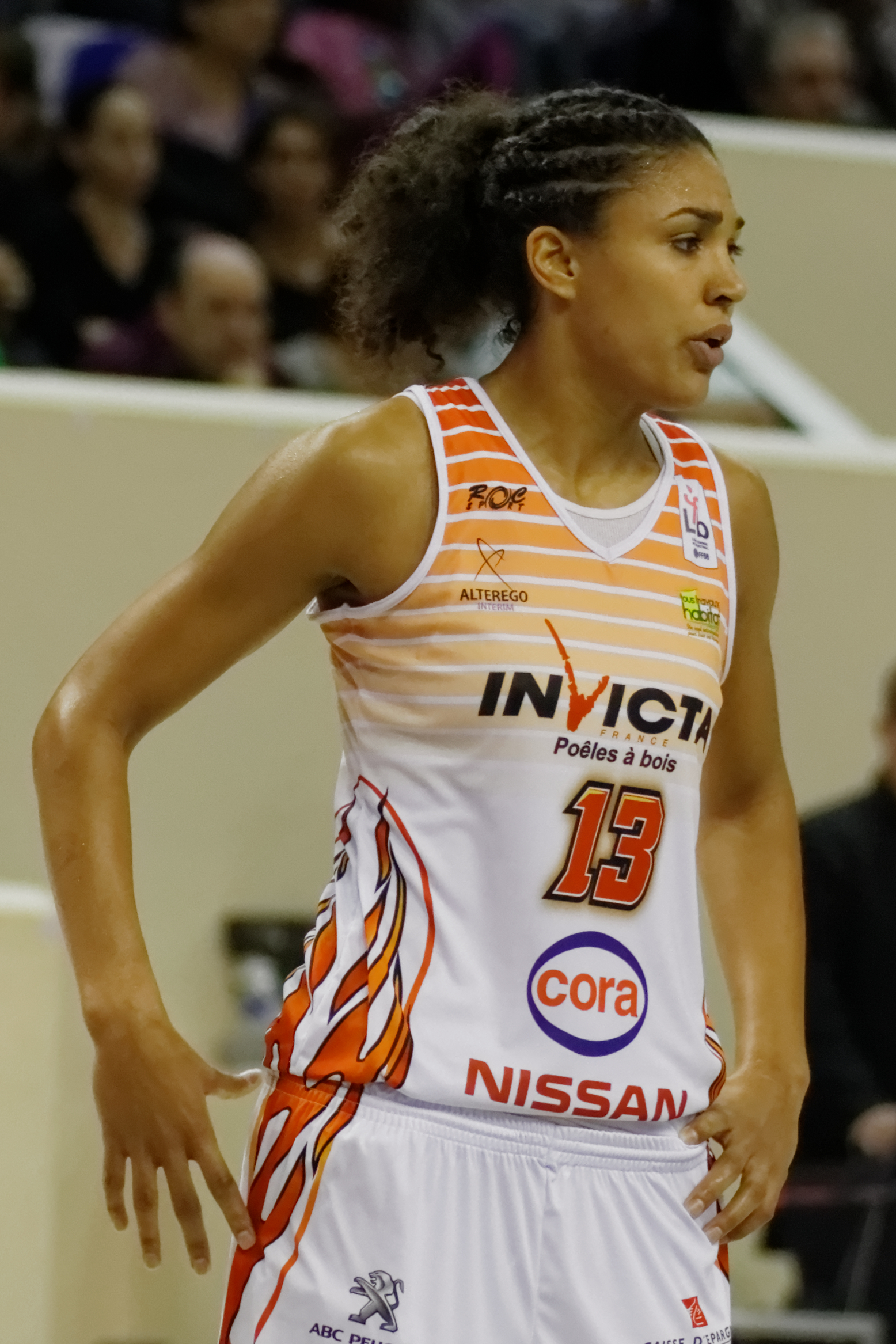

Personal information
- Born: March 14, 1984 (age 42) Colorado Springs, Colorado, U.S.
- Listed height: 6 ft 0 in (1.83 m)

Career information
- High school: Thomas B. Doherty (Colorado Springs, Colorado)
- College: BYU (2002–2006)
- WNBA draft: 2006: 2nd round, 17th overall pick
- Drafted by: Detroit Shock
- Position: Forward

Career history
- 2006: Connecticut Sun
- 2006: New York Liberty

Career highlights
- MWC Player of the Year (2006); First-team All-MWC (2006)
- Stats at Basketball Reference

Ambrosia Anderson (born March 14, 1984) is an American professional women's basketball player.

== High school ==
Anderson was born in Colorado Springs, Colorado and attended Thomas B. Doherty High School in Colorado Springs.

== Collegiate career ==
A 2006 graduate of Brigham Young University (BYU), Anderson appeared in 120 games and averaged 10.7 ppg and 5.3 rpg during her career with the Cougars. As a senior in 2005–06, Ambrosia led BYU in both scoring (18.7 ppg) and rebounding (7.4 rpg). In the Mountain West Conference, Anderson ranked second in scoring average and third in rebounding. She was also seventh in the conference in three-point percentage (.364) and fourth in defensive rebounds per game (5.47). Ambrosia was named the Mountain West Conference (MWC) Co-Player of the Year and All-MWC First Team in 2006. She also became one of only 18 players in BYU women’s basketball history to score more than 1,000 points. In 2006, she was also named a Kodak All-American Honorable Mention.

== Career statistics ==
Legend
GP	Games played	GS	Games started	MPG	Minutes per game	RPG	Rebounds per game
APG	Assists per game	SPG	Steals per game	BPG	Blocks per game	PPG	Points per game
TO	Turnovers per game	FG%	Field-goal percentage	3P%	3-point field-goal percentage	FT%	Free-throw percentage
**Bold**	Career best	°	League leader

=== WNBA ===
==== Regular season ====
Year	Team	GP	GS	MPG	FG%	3P%	FT%	RPG	APG	SPG	BPG	TO	PPG
2006	Connecticut	1	0	1.0	0.0	0.0	0.0	**2.0**	0.0	0.0	0.0	**0.0**	0.0
2006	New York Liberty	**3**	0	**3.0**	0.0	0.0	0.0	0.7	0.0	**0.3**	0.0	0.3	0.0
Career	1 year, 2 teams	4	0	2.5	0.0	0.0	0.0	1.0	0.0	0.3	0.0	0.3	0.0

=== College ===
Legend
GP	Games played	GS	Games started	MPG	Minutes per game
FG%	Field goal percentage	3P%	3-point field goal percentage	FT%	Free throw percentage
RPG	Rebounds per game	APG	Assists per game	SPG	Steals per game
BPG	Blocks per game	PPG	Points per game	**Bold**	Career high

Year	Team	GP	Points	FG%	3P%	FT%	RPG	APG	SPG	BPG	PPG
2002–03	BYU	31	133	35.7%	33.3%	66.7%	3.1	0.6	0.5	0.2	4.3
2003–04	BYU	28	267	41.0%	35.6%	**75.4%**	5.6	1.4	0.8	0.1	9.5
2004–05	BYU	30	312	**42.2%**	30.6%	72.1%	4.7	1.5	1.2	0.3	10.4
2005–06	BYU	**32**	**573**	41.3%	**36.4%**	64.5%	**7.5**	**2.0**	**1.3**	**0.5**	**17.9**
Career		121	1285	40.7%	34.4%	69.3%	5.2	1.4	0.9	0.3	10.6

== Professional career ==
The Detroit Shock drafted Anderson from Brigham Young University with the 17th pick in the second round of the 2006 WNBA draft. She was then traded to the Minnesota Lynx for Jacqueline Batteast. On May 9, she was waived by Minnesota and immediately picked up by the Connecticut Sun. She appeared in one game for the Sun before being waived on June 29. Anderson signed as free agent for the New York Liberty on July 2, 2006.

During the 2007–08 season, Anderson played in Europe for the Siemens team in Greece and was on the All Star team. During the 2008–09 season, Anderson played in Europe for the Portugal championship team, Olivais Coimbra. Ambrosia was Portugal player of the year, Forward of the year, Import Player of the year, and First Team player. During 2009–10, Ambrosia played for the Israel championship team, A. S. Ramat Hasharon Electra. Ramat Hasharon won the State Cup, the regular season championship and the League championship. Anderson was named Forward of the year, First Team Player and Import Team player. During 2010–11, Ambrosia played for Maccabi Ashdod, who lost the finals to Elitzur Ramla. Ambrosia was listed as Honorable Mention for Eurobasket.com All-Israel League Awards 2010–11. Ambrosia played for H.R LeZion, Israel, and Elitzer Netanya, Israel in 2011–12. In 2012–13, Ambrosia moved to Kara Trutnov, Czech Republic where she was named league MVP, First Team and All-Imports Team. She finished the league with an 18.4 scoring average. In 2013–14, Ambrosia played for Flammes Carolo, France, She finished the season ranked on the Second team and the All-imports team. Her points average was 14.4. Ambrosia is returning to the Flammes team for the 2014–15 season.
