= Linda Fröhlich =

German basketball player (born 1979)

Personal information
- Born: June 23, 1979 (age 47) Pforzheim, West Germany
- Listed height: 6 ft 2 in (1.88 m)
- Listed weight: 185 lb (84 kg)

Career information
- High school: Vincent Lübeck Gymnasium Stade
- College: UNLV (1998–2002)
- WNBA draft: 2002: 2nd round, 26th overall pick
- Drafted by: New York Liberty
- Playing career: 2002–2011
- Position: Power forward

Career history
- 2002–2003: New York Liberty
- 2006: Indiana Fever
- 2007: Sacramento Monarchs

Career highlights
- Third-team All-American – AP (2002); 3× MW Player of the Year (2000–2002); First-team All MWC (2000-2002); WAC Freshman of the Year (1999); WAC All-Freshman team (1999); USBWA National Freshman of the Year (1999); First-team All-WAC (1999)
- Stats at Basketball Reference

Linda Fröhlich (born June 23, 1979) is a German former professional basketball player who played in the WNBA and for the German national basketball team. She now owns a sports academy in Rancho Cucamonga, California.

== European career ==
- 2003-2005: (Italy) Trentino Rovereto
- 2005-2006: (Russia) Spartak Moscow
- 2006-2007: (Turkey) Fenerbahçe Istanbul
- 2007-2008: (Italy) Taranto Cras Basket
- 2008-2010: (Czech Republic) Gambrinus Brno
- 2008-2010: (Slovakia) Good Angels Kosice
- 2010: (Romania) Municipal MCM Târgovişte
- 2010-2011: (Spain) Ros Casares.

== Career statistics ==
Legend
GP	Games played	GS	Games started	MPG	Minutes per game	RPG	Rebounds per game
APG	Assists per game	SPG	Steals per game	BPG	Blocks per game	PPG	Points per game
TO	Turnovers per game	FG%	Field-goal percentage	3P%	3-point field-goal percentage	FT%	Free-throw percentage
**Bold**	Career best	°	League leader

=== WNBA ===
==== Regular season ====
WNBA regular season statistics
Year	Team	GP	GS	MPG	FG%	3P%	FT%	RPG	APG	SPG	BPG	TO	PPG
2002	New York	16	0	4.2	10.0	0.0	100.0	0.8	0.1	0.1	0.0	**0.3**	0.4
2003	New York	**26**	0	8.2	**43.1**	53.8	63.6	1.4	**0.6**	0.2	**0.3**	0.5	3.2
2004	Did not play (waived)												
2005	Did not play (waived)												
2006	Indiana	20	0	**8.5**	38.2	36.4	75.0	**1.8**	0.5	**0.3**	0.0	0.7	**3.3**
2007	Sacramento	10	0	5.1	30.8	**66.7**	100.0	0.9	0.2	0.1	0.1	1.2	1.4
**Career**	4 years, 3 teams	72	0	7.0	38.0	40.5	73.7	1.3	0.4	0.2	0.1	0.6	2.3

==== Playoffs ====
WNBA playoff statistics
Year	Team	GP	GS	MPG	FG%	3P%	FT%	RPG	APG	SPG	BPG	TO	PPG
2002	New York	**3**	0	6.7	0.0	0.0	50.0	**1.7**	**0.7**	0.3	0.0	1.0	0.3
2007	Sacramento	1	0	**8.0**	**33.3**	0.0	50.0	1.0	0.0	**1.0**	0.0	1.0	**3.0**
**Career**	2 years, 2 teams	4	0	7.0	16.7	0.0	50.0	1.5	0.5	0.5	0.0	1.0	1.0

=== College ===
Ratios
Year	Team	GP	FG%	3P%	FT%	RBG	APG	BPG	SPG	PPG
1998-99	UNLV	28	**46.2%**	33.3%	76.7%	9.21	2.75	0.93	2.93	**23.46**
1999-00	UNLV	28	45.9%	36.6%	79.0%	**11.39**	**4.00**	1.29	**3.21**	21.57
2000-01	UNLV	26	47.7%	**40.9%**	71.3%	9.50	3.30	**1.60**	2.30	19.20
2001-02	UNLV	**29**	45.8%	33.0%	**84.5%**	10.38	2.90	1.07	2.31	20.48
**Career**		111	46.3%	35.9%	78.5%	10.13	3.23	1.21	2.68	21.22

Totals
Year	Team	GP	FG	FGA	3P	3PA	FT	FTA	REB	A	BK	ST	PTS
1998-99	UNLV	28	**251**	**543**	30	90	125	**163**	258	77	26	82	**657**
1999-00	UNLV	28	229	499	37	101	109	138	**319**	**112**	36	**90**	604
2000-01	UNLV	26	195	409	**38**	93	72	101	246	85	**41**	59	500
2001-02	UNLV	**29**	211	461	36	**109**	**136**	161	301	84	31	67	594
**Career**		111	886	1912	141	393	442	563	1124	358	134	298	2355
