= Australian Light Heavyweight Championship =

Statistics
- First champion: Joe Kaytos
- Final champion: Ken Medlin

The Australian Light Heavyweight Wrestling Championship was one of the first light heavyweight professional wrestling championship in Australia.

== Title history ==
Wrestler:	Times:	Date won:	Location:	Notes:
Joe Kaytos	1	1940	Sydney	
Vacant	1			
Bern Tamplin	1	1943/05/08	Sydney	Defeated Alf Vockler title vacant sometime after 47/05/14.
Vacant	2			
Allan Pinfold	1	1953/01/17	Leichhardt, New South Wales	Defeats Alf Greer
Vacant	3			Pinfold left for India
Alf Greer	1	1953/02/14	Leichhardt, New South Wales	Defeats Snowy Dowton
Allen Sherry	1	1953/05/05	Leichhardt, New South Wales	
Vacant	4			Vacant in 59
Haji Baba	1	1959/10/03	Leichhardt, New South Wales	Defeats Ray Green in tournament final
Con Tolios	1	1960	Sydney	
Haji Baba	2	1960	Sydney	
Con Dandos	1	1960	Sydney	
Allen Sherry	2	1960	Sydney	
Con Tolios	2	1960	Sydney	
Col Peters		1960	Sydney	
Allan Pinfold	2	1960		
El Greco	1	62/01/13	Melbourne	Defeats Bruce Arthur
Bruce Milne	1	62/07/21	Melbourne	
Allan Pinfold	3	74/10/04	Sydney	Defeats Ken Medlin
Ken Medlin	1	74/11/01	Sydney	
Harold Kalevoris	1	76/09/18	Melbourne	
Mike Dallas	1	77/02/05	Melbourne	
Ken Medlin	2	77/03/26	Melbourne	
Vacant/Abandoned	1			Promotion closes in 78/12

== See also ==
- Professional wrestling in Australia
