= Trafalgar, Victoria =

Trafalgar
- Town
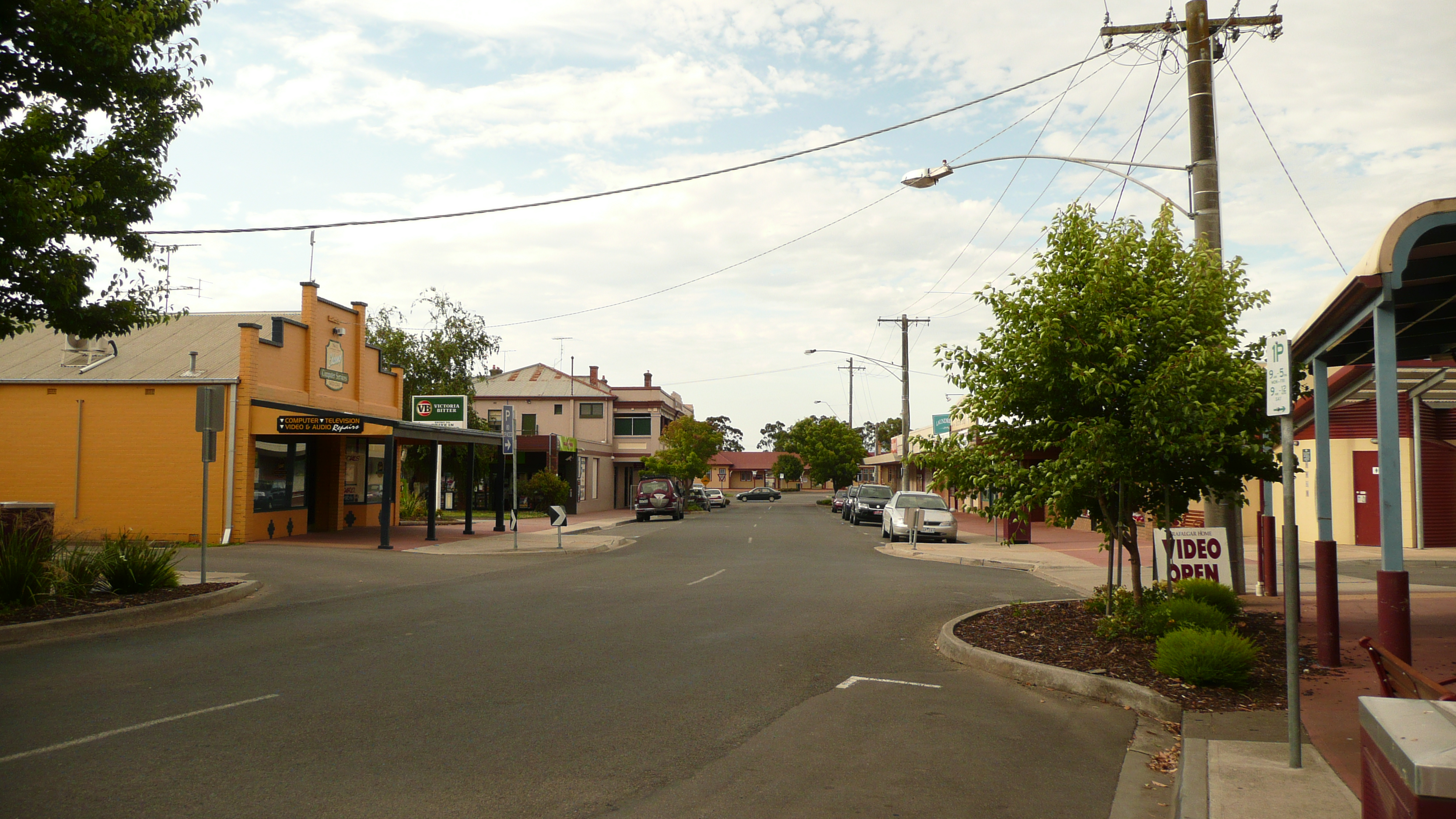
- Contingent Street

- Coordinates: 38°12′0″S 146°09′0″E
- Country: Australia
- State: Victoria
- LGA: Shire of Baw Baw
- Location: 124 km (77 mi) E of Melbourne; 11 km (6.8 mi) W of Moe

Government
  - State electorate: Narracan
  - Federal division: Monash

Population
  - Total: 3,912 (2016 census)
- Postcode: 3824
- Mean max temp: 19.3 °C (66.7 °F)
- Mean min temp: 8.9 °C (48.0 °F)
- Annual rainfall: 749.4 mm (29.50 in)

Trafalgar is a town in the West Gippsland region of Victoria, Australia. The town lies on the Princes Highway and main Gippsland railway line about 10 kilometres (6 mi) west of Moe. The town backs onto the foothills of the Strzelecki Ranges to the south. The township sits at approximately 70 metres above sea level. At the 2016 census, Trafalgar had a population of 3,912. The town is named in honour of the Battle of Trafalgar, 1805, which established the Royal Navy's supremacy at sea; allowing consolidation of Britain's Australian colonies at the time.

Trafalgar Post Office opened on 2 June 1879.

Trafalgar was noted for having a cheese factory producing award-winning cheeses. The factory was owned by Petersville from 1960 until its closure in 1990.

The town has a railway station on the Bairnsdale railway line. It also has a swimming pool, tennis courts, Scouts hall, Uniting church and town hall.

== Education ==
Trafalgar is serviced by a number of schools:

- Trafalgar Primary School
- St Josephs School (Primary)
- Trafalgar High School

== Sport ==
Trafalgar has an Australian Rules football team, The Bloods, which competes in the Mid Gippsland Football League. In their distinctive colours of blood red with white stripes, The Bloods have had great success since joining the league in 1969, winning over 100 premierships, their latest being in 2017 when they defeated Newborough by 69 points.

Golfers play at the course of the Trafalgar Golf Club on Gibsons Road, often listed by golfing magazines as one of the best in Australia.

Trafalgar has a lawn bowling club, the Trafalgar Bowls Club with a synthetic green and a grass green, situated in Seven Mile Road. The Club officially opened in September, 1915.

Warragul Radio stations Triple M Gippsland and 3GG also service this region.

== Notable people ==
- Judy Hall, local musician and piano teacher in Gippsland for over 70 years.
- Tim Forsyth, Olympic highjumper, attended Trafalgar High School
- Harold Mitchell, Melbourne based media tycoon and philanthropist
- Bill Collins, race-caller

== See also ==
- Thorpdale, Victoria
- Moe, Victoria
- Trafalgar railway station
