= British Wrestling Federation =

British Wrestling Federation may refer to:

- a collective of British professional wrestling promotions 1958-1970 headed by Paul Lincoln
- a British professional wrestling promotion active c. 1960s - c.2000 owned by Orig Williams
