= Australian Tag Team Championship =

Professional wrestling tag team championship

Details
- Promotion: Australian wrestling
- Date established: 13 February 1954
- Date retired: 7 December 1957
Statistics
- First champion(s): John Morrow and Snowy Dowton
- Final champion(s): Jon Morro and Frank Morro

The Australian Tag Team Wrestling Championship was one of the first Tag team professional wrestling championship in Australia.

== Title history ==
Wrestler:	Times:	Date won:	Location:	Notes:
John Morrow and Snowy Dowton	1	13 February 1954	Sydney	Defeat Bud Cody and Alan Pinfold in tournament final.
Allan Sherry and Allan Pinfold	1	18 February 1956	Sydney	
Bob George and Alf Greer	1	25 February 1956	Sydney	
Vacant				
Jon Morro and Frank Morro	1	7 December 1957	Sydney	Defeats Tony Kontellis and Norm Ryan
Con Dantos and Con Tolios	1		Melbourne	Defeats Col Peters and Braka Cortez in tournament final

== See also ==
- Professional wrestling in Australia
