= Trafalgar High School =

Coordinates: 38°12′36″S 146°09′16″E

- Trafalgar, West Gippsland, Victoria; Australia

Information
- Type: Government-funded co-educational secondary day school
- Motto: French: Quant je puis (As much as I am able)
- Established: 6 February 1964; 62 years ago
- Oversight: Department of Education
- Principal: Brett Pedlow
- Years: 7–12
- Enrolment: c. 800
- Colours: Green, black and white (academic); Red and white (sport)
- Newspaper: Trafalgar High School Newsletter (weekly newsletter); Trafalgar High School Student Paper (student-run news and variety publication)
- Yearbook: The Helm
- Website: www.trafalgarhs.vic.edu.au

Trafalgar High School is a government-funded co-educational secondary day school, located in Trafalgar, West Gippsland, Victoria, Australia. It officially opened in 1964 after running classes on the original Trafalgar Primary School grounds, now Balfour Park. When it opened the school had 95 pupils. The school now provides an education for students from Year 7 to Year 12.

== History ==
The Light Timber Construction Type 300 High School was officially opened on 12 June 1964, by the Hon. J Bloomfield MLA, Minister for Education; after a successful motion was passed at a public meeting held in 1961 to press for a High School in Trafalgar.

By 1966 the enrolment had reached 300. The first Higher School Certificate (now VCE) class graduated in 1971.

In September 1974, the new Trade Wing was opened and the science room extended to include a laboratory and a second science room.

The Education Community Activity (ECA) Centre was opened in 1982 by the state Member of Parliament Hon. James C.M. Balfour CBE, with an official opening held on 12 February.

The school secured funding from the Victorian government in 2009. With this money the school received a new building and a refurbishment of the original.

== Notable alumni ==
- Tim Forsyth, Olympic High Jumper
- John Lenders, Treasurer of Victoria

== See also ==
- VELS
