= Lowanna College =

Location
- Newborough, Victoria; Gippsland; 38.1762°S 146.2856°E

Information
- Opened: 1994
- School number: 8821
- Principal: Adam Hogan
- Staff: 120
- Years offered: 7–12
- Enrollment: approx. 1000
- Education system: VELS, VCAL, VET and VCE
- Campuses: 1
- Website: www.lowanna.vic.edu.au

Lowanna College is secondary school located in Newborough, Victoria. The college draws its enrolment from Moe/Newborough, and district towns of Yallourn North, Erica, Rawson, Willow Grove and the surrounding rural areas. In 2015 the school has a student population of 1024.

== Curriculum ==
The College offers programs in VELS and VCE, including units in English, Mathematics, Science, SOSE, Technology, Arts, Health and Physical Education. Additionally, programs including VET, VCAL, the Jobs Pathways Program and Students at Risk are conducted to ensure that all students are catered for. Lowanna College is also a participant in Monash University, Gippsland campus's Cooperative Education program, the Monash Gippsland VCE tutoring program, SAM (Schools Access Monash) program and offers the Hands On Learning program.

== Extra-curricular ==
Students are also offered the opportunity to participate in debating competitions, public speaking competitions, art performance and musical productions, international exchanges, community work, debutante balls, instrumental learning programs, sister school visits, Tournament of Minds, lunch time activities program, student leadership programs, school camps and sporting competitions.

== Facilities ==
The modern campus operates as three individual "mini schools": Junior, Middle, and Senior. The campus features a school farm, special programs centre, and arts and technology wing, including a photography lab and auto workshop. The school also utilises a computer network and multimedia skills centre. Additionally, the school uses Interactive Whiteboards.

Despite a commitment in 1998 by the Kennett state government to contribute A$270,000 to build only a 250-seat auditorium, a 580-seat auditorium now supports the college's performing arts program. A double gymnasium with sprung floor is used for the physical education and sports program. Both the auditorium and gym are also used by the wider community.

== College history ==
Lowanna College has a history which can be traced back to the 1920s. In 1928 the Yallourn Technical College was established, and over the following years, grew substantially to serve a wide area, including Moe

By the 1950s the growth of Moe required a new school to be built in the town, and Moe High School was officially opened in 1954. Shortly after, in 1957 Yallourn Technical College moved to its current Newborough site. There was still a need for further educational provision and Newborough High School was opened in 1964.

By the 1990s the number of students attending secondary school had dropped substantially and governments were looking for schools to amalgamate. In 1994 the three secondary colleges amalgamated to form Lowanna College.

With a vision for a new single campus, the College successfully lobbied the government and a total of over $13.5 million was used to build the current campus.

== Sister schools ==
Lowanna College has two overseas sister schools: the first, Taizhou Middle School number 2 is located in Taizhou, China, whilst the second, Istituto Professionale di Stato, Castelfranco Veneto is situated near Venice, in Italy.
