= Thorpdale railway line =

Former railway line in Victoria, Australia

Thorpdale

Overview
- Stations: 4

Service
- Type: Victorian Railways passenger service

History
- Opened: 8 May 1888
- Closed: 4 December 1958

Technical
- Line length: 18 km (11 mi)
- Number of tracks: Single

The Thorpdale railway line, which ran from Moe to Thorpdale, was a railway line in Gippsland, Victoria, Australia.
