= Moe, Victoria =

Moe
- Town
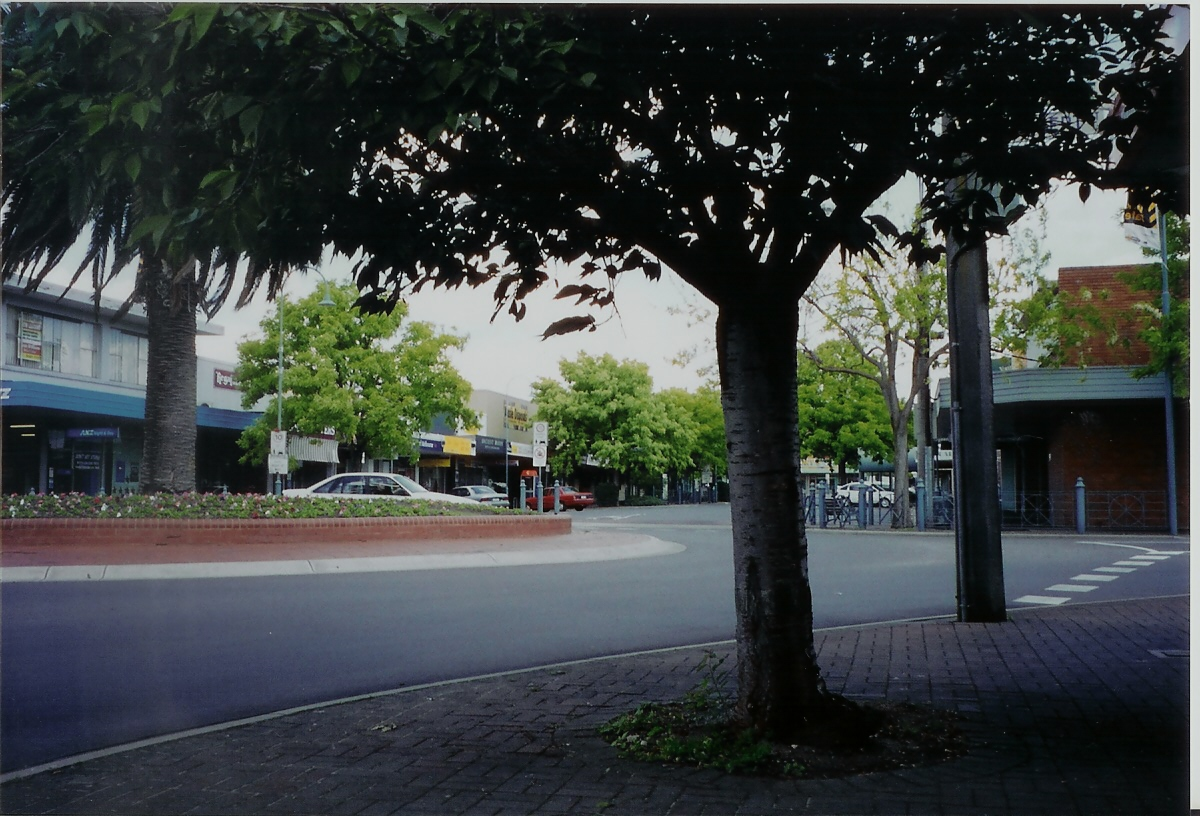
- Streetscape in central Moe

- Coordinates: 38°10′20″S 146°16′04″E
- Country: Australia
- State: Victoria
- LGAs: City of Latrobe; Shire of Baw Baw
- Location: 130 km (81 mi) from Melbourne; 12 km (7.5 mi) from Morwell

Government
  - State electorates: Morwell; Narracan
  - Federal division: Monash

Area (2011 urban)
  - Total: 105.3 km^{2} (40.7 sq mi)

Population
  - Total: 9,375 (2021 census)
  - Density: 89.03/km^{2} (230.59/sq mi)
- Postcode: 3825
- County: Buln Buln

Moe (/ˈmoʊi/ MOH-ee) is a town in the Latrobe Valley in the Gippsland region of Victoria, Australia. It is approximately 130 kilometres (80 miles) east of the central business district of Melbourne, 45 kilometres (30 miles) due south of the peak of Mount Baw Baw in the Great Dividing Range and features views of the Baw Baw Ranges to the north and Strzelecki Ranges to the south.

At June 2018, Moe had an estimated urban population of 16,812 (including Newborough). The population has been slowly shrinking with an average annual rate of –0.1% year-on-year for the five years to 2018. It is administered by the Latrobe City Council. Moe was originally known as The Mowie, then Little Moi. The town's name is believed to derive from a Kurnai (local Indigenous) word "moia" or "mouay" meaning "swamp".

Moe is a navigation point and stopover for tourists en route to Erica, the historic goldfields township of Walhalla, the Walhalla Goldfields Railway and Mount Baw Baw. Lake Narracan is nearby, and Moe is home to the annual Moe Cup horse races, the Moe Jazz Festival and the recreated historic settlement Old Gippstown. The city has locally produced Aboriginal/Koori art and is regularly home to local Australian Football and Netball Finals in the Gippsland Football & Netball Leagues and the Mid Gippsland Football League. The region is represented by Gippsland Power in the TAC Cup competition.

== History ==
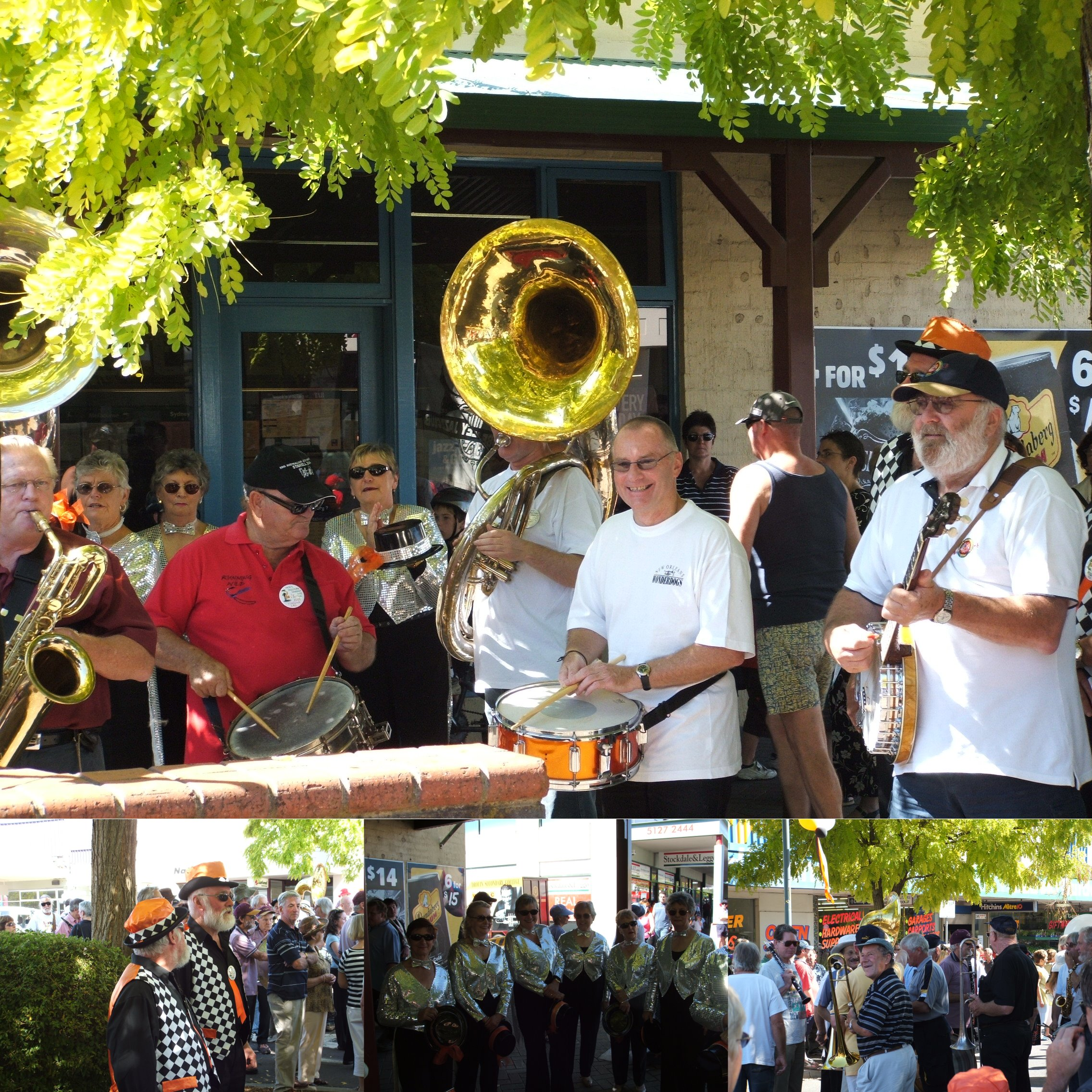
Moe Jazz Festival 2005

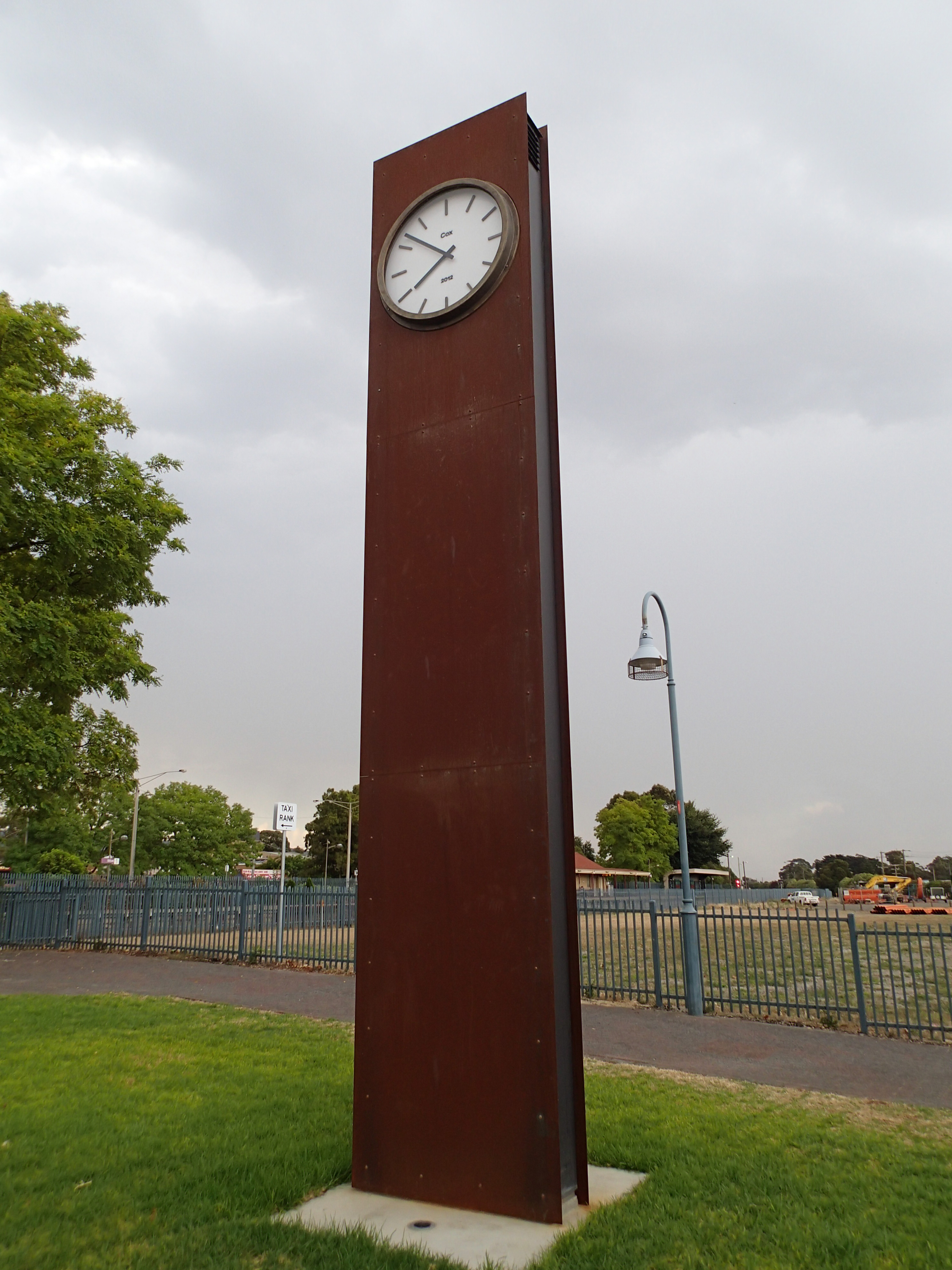
Moe Clock Tower

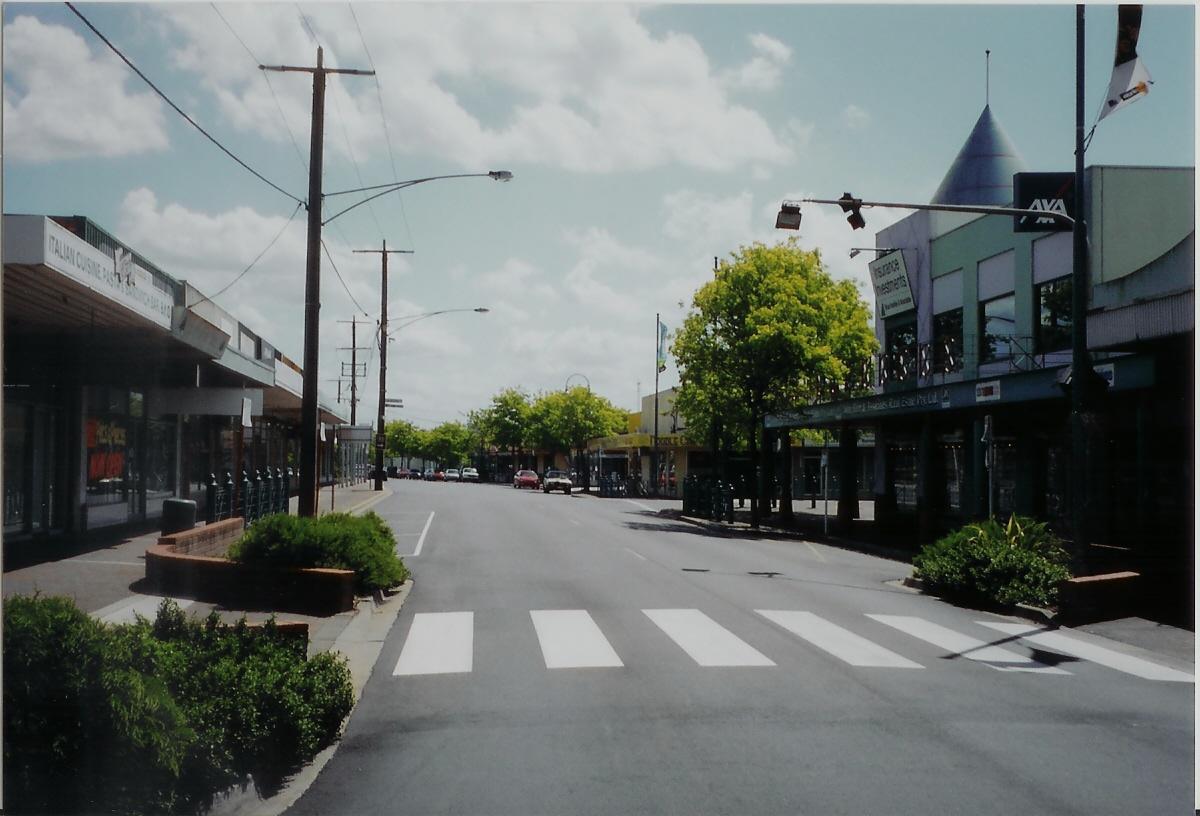
George Street, 2006

A small gold discovery was made in 1852. The small settlement on the Narracan Creek was a stopover en route to the Walhalla goldfields further north. A Post Office opened on 17 March 1862.

In 1878 the Shire of Narracan was proclaimed, and the railway arrived from Morwell. Moe railway station was a key station, with a roundhouse, and connections to the now-closed Walhalla, Thorpdale and Yallourn lines. The town was surveyed in 1879. Moe was declared a city in 1963.

A major local industry is based around the brown coal deposits in the Latrobe Valley east of Moe and electricity generation. The area is also noted for its dairy industry.

Moe High School opened in 1953, with the Official opening in November of the same year. The school was closed and merged into Lowanna Secondary College in 1994, with the previous Moe High School location becoming a housing estate.

== Demographics ==
On the night of the 2011 census there were 15,292 residing in the Moe urban centre: 51.7% female and 48.3% male. At the time Moe had an Indigenous (Aboriginal or Torres Strait Islander) population of 1.4%, whilst 79.8% of the overall population were Australian born caucasians. The other main countries of origin were: England (4%), Netherlands (1.5%), Scotland (1.2%), Germany (1.1%) and Malta (1.1%).

== Development ==
Moe Railway Precinct Revitalisation Project: A clock tower was constructed in 2012 incorporating two bronze clocks that chime on the hour. The clocks were manufactured in Moe by local clockmaker Alan Cox. Electricity supply lines on George Street (one of Moe's main streets that intersects with Moore Street from Saviges Road to Anzac Road) have recently been placed underground at a cost of over $2 million. The undergrounding included the installation of new street lighting and two 66 kV distribution boxes which will be used to place the remaining supply lines in the CBD underground in the future.

Moe has three large urban housing developments.

Mitchell Grove (off Mitchells Road) is a two-kilometre walk west of the CBD of Moe and has two residential housing stages (Mitchell Grove Stage 1 & Mitchell Views) next to a newly completed artificial wetland. The first entrance street to the new development has been named Discovery Boulevarde. Mitchell Grove development is likely to exceed 1,000 residences.

Monash Views is a 221-lot development in final implementation off Monash Road and Coach road in the suburb of Newborough approximately five kilometres from the Moe CBD. The development plan includes a partial redevelopment of the Yallourn Golf Club which borders the estate to the north by Ogilvy-Clayton. The final size of Monash Views development through to Haunted Hills Road may exceed 1,000 residences.

Another large-scale development is in final planning stage near Lake Narracan, a few kilometres from the Moe CBD. The development will be bordered by Thompsons Road, Moe Golf Club, Hayes Road and the south shore of Lake Narracan—then extending to Becks Bridge Road to the west. The first developed section is in an area planned to have around 1,000 homes—of a total of approximately 4,000.

== Education ==
Moe is serviced by a number of primary schools including:

- Moe (Albert Street) Primary School
- Moe (South Street) Primary School
- Moe (Elizabeth Street) Primary School
- St Kieran's Primary School (Catholic)
- Barringa Special School (Day Special School)
- St Mary's Primary School (Catholic)
- Newborough Primary (Murray Road)
- Newborough East Primary

Moe is also serviced by two secondary colleges:

- Lowanna Secondary College, a single campus year 7–12 state secondary college located in nearby Newborough, and
- Lavalla Catholic College, a multi campus Catholic secondary college with its year 7–9 Presentation campus located in Newborough.

Tertiary education is offered through GippsTAFE (Yallourn, Warragul, Leongatha, Morwell). Federation University also has its Gippsland campus at nearby Churchill.

== Economy ==
The economy is mainly driven by the primary sector of the economy, natural resources and the secondary sector including coal mining, processing and fossil-fuel power generation for the National Electricity Market.

The local agriculture industry is involved in the production of wool and dairy products, as well as vegetable growing.

== Sporting facilities ==
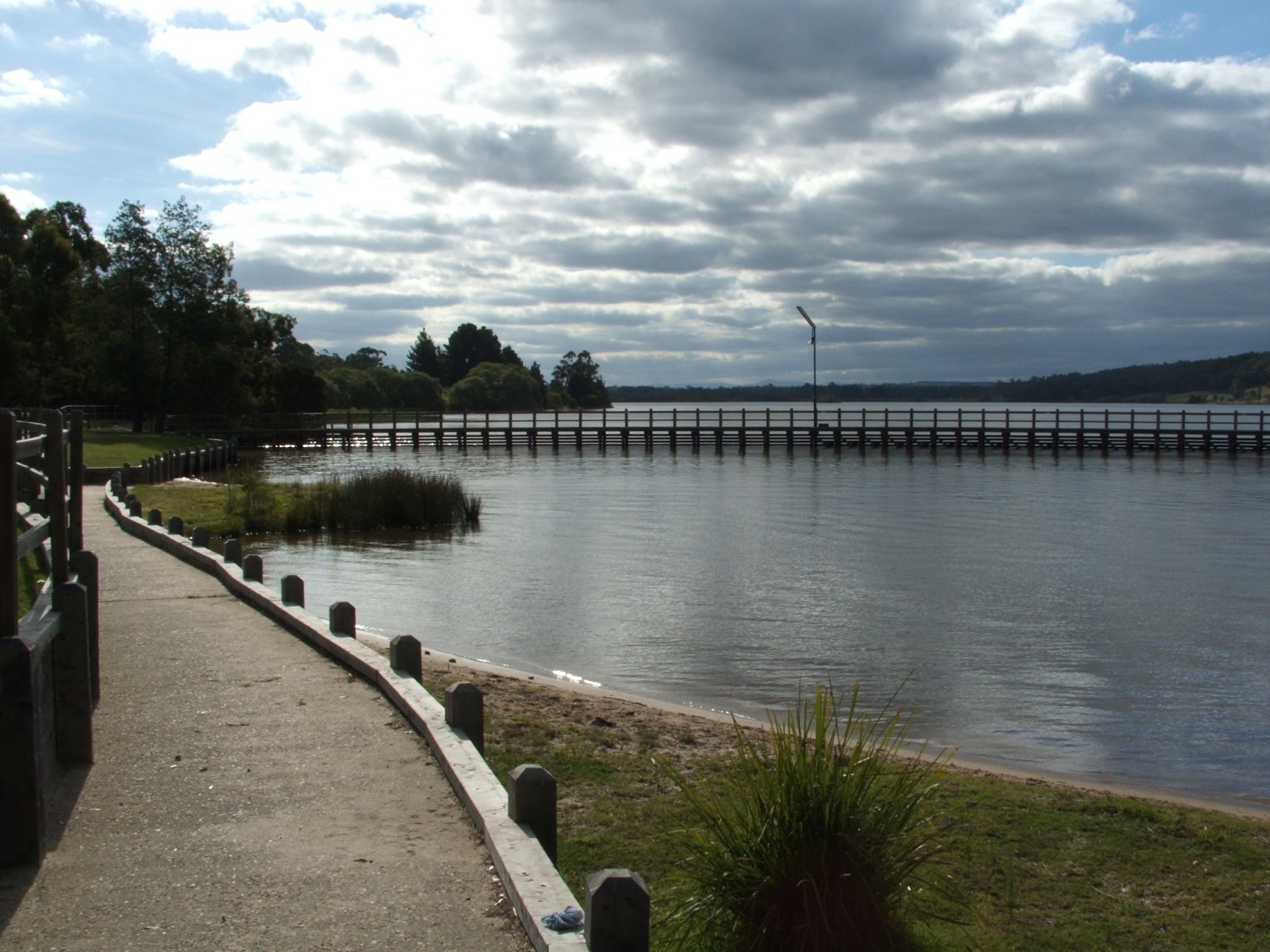
Lake Narracan

Moe has a varied and wide range of sporting facilities available for use.

=== Vale Street sports facilities ===
==== Ted Summerton Reserve ====
Australian Football and Cricket

Ted Summerton Reserve in the west end of Vale Street, Moe is used for Australian Football and Cricket and is a 900-metre walk south along Fowler Street to Vale Street from the Moe V/line train station and CBD. The reserve is undergoing development and has recently had an upgrading of its facilities including an upgrade to the players facilities, preparation of the surrounds of the playing surface for spectator stands to be constructed, spectator terracing, new South Street entrance gate, upgraded scoreboard, and the development of a shared community facility called Moe P.L.A.C.E on the property borderline between the reserve and the adjacent South Street Primary School, far enough back from the eastern wing of the playing surface for a future spectator stand.
The Moe P.L.A.C.E. facility is accessible from both Ted Summerton Reserve and South Street Primary School seeing as it has S.S.P.S on one side and Ted Summerton Reserve on the other, and was completed in 2011. The facility is part of the Moe Southside Community Precinct and includes a sports hall with side music room and stage at its northern end, community facilities and an Early Learning Centre at its southern end. The development is part of the Moe Southside Precinct development. Moe has an Australian rules football team competing in the Gippsland League, the Moe Lions, whose home ground is Ted Summerton Reserve. The reserve is owned by government, administered by Latrobe City Council and has a permanently elliptical surface.

The reserve has been identified as a venue for Women's T20 cricket during the 2026 Commonwealth Games held across Victoria.

The reserve is named after Edward (Ted/Toby) Summerton (1917–1990) who served many years as both a Councillor and Mayor for the former City of Moe.

=== Olympic Park ===
==== Soccer ====
Olympic Park in Moe is located next to the outdoor swimming pool at the east end of Vale Street and is used for soccer. It has two rectangular pitches, one north–south and one east–west. It is the home ground for Moe United SC who play in the Latrobe Valley Soccer League. The Victorian regional leagues are the eighth level of soccer in Victoria, and the ninth nationally.

A new community sports building is on the east side at Olympic Park. The reserve is owned by government, administered by Latrobe City Council.

==== Moe Outdoor Pool ====
The Olympic Pool in Moe is at the east end of Vale Street next to the Olympic Park Reserve. The Moe Outdoor Pool features a 50m Pool, Children's Pool, Diving Pool, Kiosk & Electric BBQs, Beach Volleyball Court, Change Facilities, Ample grass & shade shelters. The pool has recently undergone a multi-million-dollar upgrade. It boasts a separate diving pool, a 50-metre pool and a newly constructed children's pool with an interactive splashpad.

The reconstruction works were carried out by local businesses and administered by Latrobe City Counci.

=== Latrobe Leisure Moe Newborough ===
The local leisure centre consists of a 25-metre, six-lane indoor heated pool, a unisex spa at one end of the complex and sauna at the other, gymnasium with both electronic and state-of-the-art pin-loaded equipment (including rowers, treadmills, exercise bikes and steppers), squash court, 400-metre all-weather athletics track and grass field with asphalt cycling track around the perimeter, night lighting for the athletics track and indoor sports halls featuring four full-sized indoor basketball courts that are utilised by local basketball, netball, volleyball and badminton associations. The complex also has ample parkland around it and the Newborough Football Ground is also adjacent to the complex.

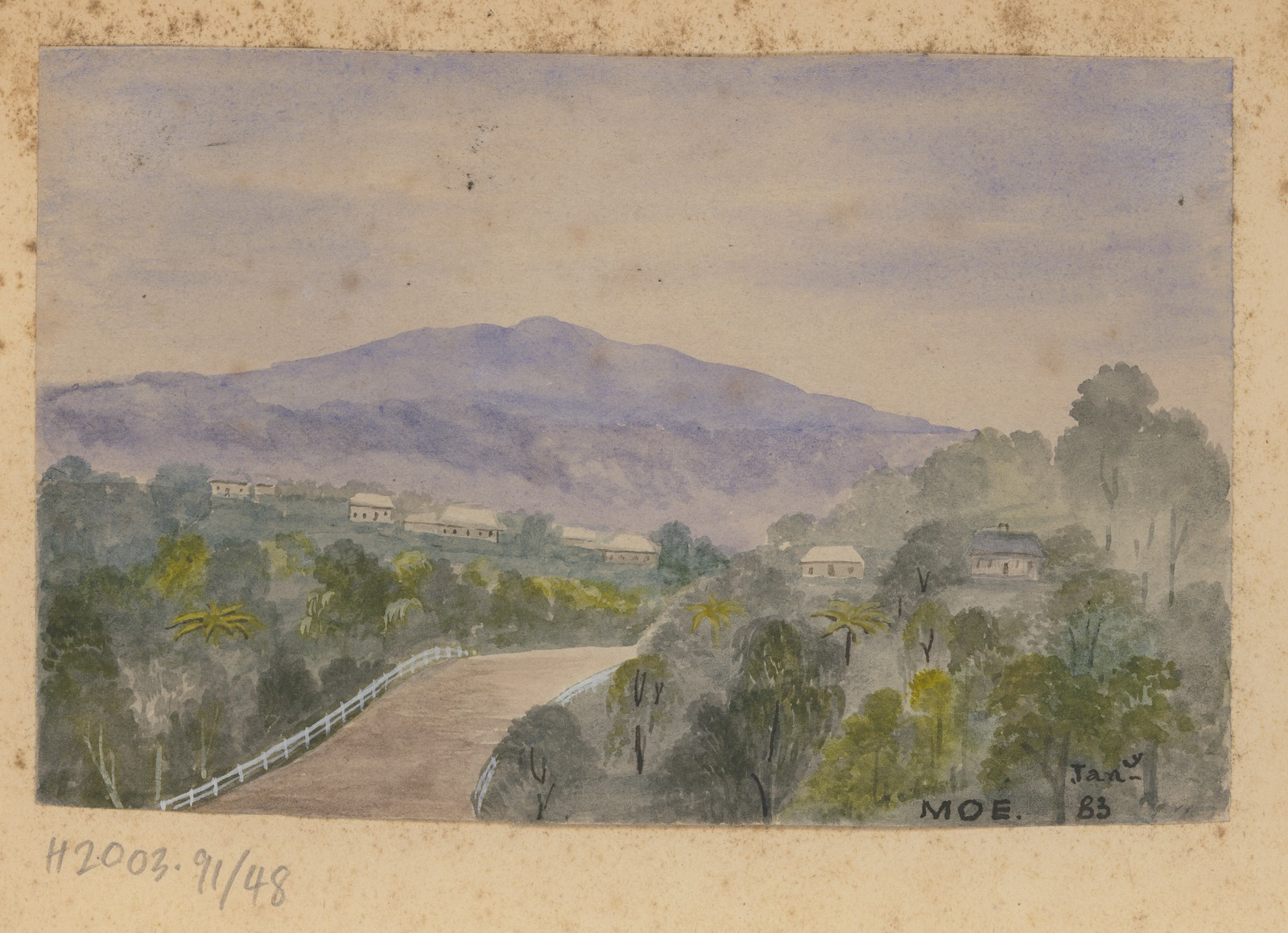
Moe, Victoria, 1883, Daniel Long [State Library Victoria]

=== Lake Narracan ===
Lake Narracan is located immediately to the north of Moe. Lake Narracan is increasingly being used for recreational purposes, including water-skiing, jet skiing and recreational fishing and has a small caravan park and water-ski club.

=== Moe Golf Club & Yallourn Golf Club ===
There are two golf courses, the Moe Golf Club on Thompsons Road, Newborough and the Yallourn Golf Club in Monash Road, Newborough.

=== Horse Racing ===
Moe has a horse racing club, the Moe Racing Club, which schedules around fifteen race meetings a year including the Moe Cup meeting in October. The racecourse is in Waterloo Road within walking distance of the centre of Moe.

=== Lawn Bowls ===
==== Yallourn Bowling Club & Moe Bowling Club ====
Yallourn Bowling Club is on the corner of Monash Road and Coach Road in Newborough and is host of the TRUenergy Classic Singles tournament.

Moe Bowling Club is on the corner of Saviges Road and Waterloo Road in Moe, a very short walk from the Moe Train Station and CBD.

=== Tennis ===
==== Moe Tennis Club & Latrobe Indoor Tennis Club ====
The Moe Tennis Club is on Botanic Drive in the Moe Botanic Gardens a short distance from the Moe CBD. The facility features 15 outdoor synpave courts with seven under lights for night tennis and a club house. The club is affiliated with Latrobe Valley Tennis Association Junior Competition and Loy Yang Yinnar & District Association Senior Competition.

A short distance away (over the Moe-Yallourn Rail Trail to the North of the Botanic Gardens) is the Latrobe Indoor Tennis Centre in Haigh Street, Moe featuring five indoor courts.

=== Mount Baw Baw ===
Nearby Mount Baw Baw and Mount St Gwinear are popular destinations for snow sports, with Mount Baw Baw having a small ski resort and Mount St Gwinear used for cross-country skiing.

== Transport ==
V/Line runs a passenger rail service to Moe station as part of the Traralgon and Gippsland V/Line rail services which runs to Melbourne's major stations Southern Cross and Flinders Street. Currently, services that run to the Latrobe Valley are listed as Traralgon services. Moe is approximately 1 hour and 40 minutes from the CBD of Melbourne by train. The V/Line rail line to the Latrobe Valley has recently been upgraded by the State Government of Victoria for fast-rail; future express services from Melbourne's CBD to the Latrobe Valley could cut the travel time to Moe to 1 hour and 15 minutes. One of V/line's N class locomotives, N475, is named 'City of Moe' in honour of the town.

Latrobe Valley Buslines provides local services around Moe and other cities in the Latrobe Valley.

Moe is an approximate 100-minute drive from the centre of Melbourne via the Princes Freeway.

Latrobe Valley Airport is approximately a twenty-minute drive.

== Media ==
Moe is serviced by the Latrobe Valley Express newspaper, which used to include a weekly insert called the Moe Narracan News. The Latrobe Valley Express is delivered free to residences in the Latrobe Valley region and has a current circulation of approximately 34,128 (CAB). The Warragul & Drouin Gazette is also available for purchase.

Warragul commercial radio stations 531AM 3GG and 94.3/97.9 Triple M Gippsland service this region along with all five Australian Broadcasting Corporation (ABC) radio networks and several community and narrowcast stations.

Commercial Melbourne based television networks such as the Seven, Nine and 10 networks are all re-broadcast in the Latrobe Valley by their regional affiliates, which are Seven, WIN Television and 10 Regional Victoria, respectively. All three channels have local commercials placed on their broadcasts and WIN TV also broadcasts a state-wide regional news bulletin from Monday to Friday at 5:30 p.m.

New channels broadcast by the commercial networks in addition to the ones listed above are available on the digital service called Freeview to viewers in Moe and the Gippsland and Latrobe Valley region. These channels include 10 Drama, 10 Comedy, 7two, 7mate, 9Gem and 9Go!.

Most Melbourne channels (Seven Network, Channel Nine, Channel 10) are digital in Moe with a suitable roof-top antenna. Both national public broadcasters, ABC—including channels ABC, ABC Family, ABC Entertains, ABC News—and Special Broadcasting Service—including SBS and SBS Viceland, are broadcast to the Latrobe Valley from the TV tower at Mount Tassie, as well as from the Dandenong Ranges transmitters located east of Melbourne.

== Notable people ==
- Jason Bright, (V8 Supercar driver)
- Josiah Brooks, a.k.a. Jazza, YouTuber
- Ken Dazzler Dunlop (OAM), professional wrestler
- Jarrod Fletcher, boxer
- Manny Gelagotis, NSL player, horse racing trainer
- Anne Gordon, cricketer
- Ted Hopkins, (VFL player; member of Carlton's 1970 premiership team)
- Brad Knowles, cricketer
- Troy Makepeace (AFL player)
- Teagan Micah, (Australia women's national soccer team goalkeeper)
- Matt O'Hea, basketballer
- Lisa Phillips, lawn bowler
- Tom Reynolds, politician
- Barry Rowlings, (VFL player; premiership winner with Hawthorn in 1976 and Richmond in 1980)
- Jaz Shelley, basketballer
- John Somerville, (VFL Player; member of Essendon's 1962 premiership team)
- Peter Somerville, (AFL player; member of Essendon's 1993 premiership team)
- Alex Sheedy, basketballer
- Karen Synon, politician
- Harry Watson, VFL player
- Ashlee Wells, hockey player
- Shanrah Wakefield, writer and actress

== See also ==
- Moe incest case
- Old Gippstown
