= Casey Airfield =

Former airfield in Victoria, Australia

- IATA: none; ICAO: YBER

Summary
- Airport type: Private (closed)
- Serves: Berwick
- Location: Edrington, Berwick, Melbourne, Victoria, Australia
- Opened: 1938
- Closed: 1994
- Elevation AMSL: 105 ft (32 m)
- Coordinates: 38°2′23″S 145°20′9″E

Map
- Location of the former airport in Greater Metropolitan Melbourne

Runways
Direction	Length		Surface
Direction	ft	m	Surface
09/27	3,000	914	Grass
12/30	3,000	914	Asphalt

Casey Airfield, later known as Berwick Airfield (ICAO: YBER), was a small airfield for light aircraft located in Berwick, in the outer eastern suburbs of Melbourne, Victoria, Australia. It was built by Rupert Ryan on Edrington, a property that he and his sister, Maie, inherited in 1935 from their uncle and aunt. Ryan turned the property into a successful stud farm. In 1921, Maie, an artist, author and pilot, married Richard Casey (later Baron Casey, the 16th Governor-General of Australia), and following Ryan's death, they acquired the homestead and airfield on the estate.

== History ==
=== Private use ===
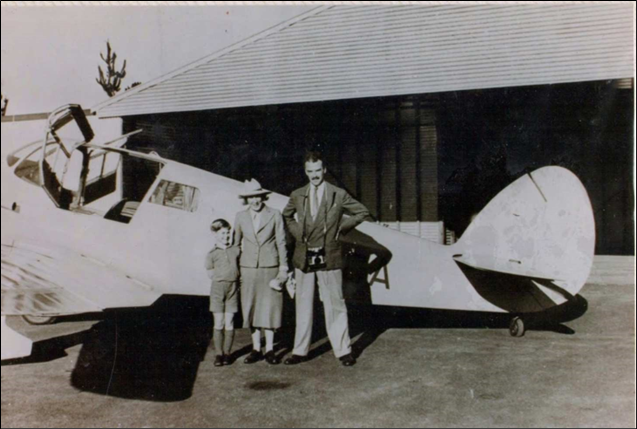
Maie and Richard Casey with their son Don in front of their Percival Vega Gull at Casey Airfield in 1938.

In 1937, Richard and Maie Casey took flying lessons, obtained their licences and bought a Percival Vega Gull which Richard flew between Melbourne and Canberra. Ryan built a landing strip on the property in 1938 and built a hangar to house the Gull. When certified as an aerodrome in June of that year it was named Casey Airfield. Use of the airfield was suspended at the outbreak of World War II and the Caseys' Gull was impressed into the Royal Australian Air Force in November 1939.

The airfield resumed operation in 1947 when Ryan gave permission for the Victorian Motorless Flight Group to use it for glider operations and sport parachuting. VMFG relocated to Bacchus Marsh Airfield in 1962. Richard Casey purchased a Miles Messenger in 1953 and housed it at the airfield until 1962.

=== Commercial use ===
In 1968 the airfield was taken over by Groupair Pty Ltd, founded by Keith Hatfield and Ron Kerrison, and renamed Berwick Airfield. Groupair operated a flying school, aerial charter operation and aircraft maintenance facilities. The company had plans for expansion and to turn it into a commercial airport. Some promotional material referred to the location as "Casey Airport". The Royal Victorian Aero Club also conducted flying training from the airfield and planned to move up to 60% of basic flying training away from Moorabbin Airport. Following Kerrison's death in a flying accident in 1969, the company was purchased by Bryce Killen, a grazier. The company went into liquidation in 1978 and the assets were bought by Pressfast Industries which planned to turn the site into business park, with a small area retained for helicopter operations. A helicopter hangar was constructed in 1982 but the airfield was out of use by 1989.

The airfield formally closed in 1994 and the Victorian Government acquired the land. In 1996 it became the Berwick Campus of Monash University. The original 1938 hangar and Casey's Miles Messenger are preserved at the Australian National Aviation Museum at Moorabbin Airport. In 2018 the site became Federation University Australia, Berwick campus.

== See also ==
- List of airports in Victoria
