= Baroness Casey =

Baroness Casey may refer to:

- Maie Casey, Baroness Casey (1892–1983), Australian pioneer aviator, poet, librettist, biographer, memoirist and artist
- Louise Casey, Baroness Casey of Blackstock (born 1965), British government official

== See also ==
- Richard Casey, Baron Casey (1890–1976), Australian statesman and Governor-General of Australia
