= Edrington (house) =

Heritage-listed house in Melbourne, Victoria, Australia

- Location of the house in Greater Metropolitan Melbourne

General information
- Status: Completed
- Type: House
- Architectural style: Art Nouveau; Federation Queen Anne; Federation Arts and Crafts
- Location: 6 Melville Park Drive, Berwick, City of Casey, Melbourne, Victoria, Australia
- Coordinates: 38°02′20″S 145°21′17″E
- Named for: Edrington castle, Scotland
- Year built: 1906–1907
- Completed: 1907; 119 years ago
- Client: Samuel Peter Mackay
- Owner: S. P. Mcakay (1906–1912); A. S. Chirnside (1912–1934); Rupert Ryan (1934–1952); Lord Richard and Lady Casey (1952–1983)

Technical details
- Material: Red brick; stone; timber; terracotta tiles; stucco; shingles
- Grounds: 400 ha (1,000 acres) (1912); 50.2 ha (124 acres) (after 1983)

Design and construction
- Architect: Rodney Alsop

Victorian Heritage Register
- Official name: Edrington
- Type: Registered place
- Designated: 11 March 1987
- Reference no.: H0653
- Heritage overlay no.: HO4
- Categories: Farming and Grazing; Parks, Gardens and Trees; Residential buildings (private)

Register of the National Estate
- Official name: Edrington
- Type: Defunct register
- Designated: 28 September 1982
- Reference no.: 5864

Edrington is a house located at 6 Melville Park Drive (Note: Also described as located at 132 High Street, Berwick.) in Berwick, in the City of Casey, in the outer eastern suburbs of Melbourne, in Victoria, Australia.

Built in 1906–1907 on the traditional lands of the Bunurong people, the house was added to the Victorian Heritage Register on 11 March 1987 in recognition of its historical, architectural, and aesthetic significance; and was also added to non-statutory lists by the Victorian branch of the National Trust on 21 May 1981 and the now defunct Register of the National Estate on 28 September 1982.

No longer a residence, the house was repurposed as a community centre for the Edrington Park Retirement Village; and some of the former estate forms part of the Berwick campus of the Federation University Australia.

== History ==
=== Late-19th and early-20th century ===
The property was previously known as Melville Park. It was owned by Captain Robert Gardiner, a squatter, who sold it to James Gibb, who planted many of the surviving trees, and used the property as a stud and for cropping. Gibb was a local Councillor in the Shire of Berwick, including serving as president on six occasions, and was the Member for Mornington from 1880 to 1886, and the federal Member for Flinders from 1903 to 1906. Although the barn and shearing shed were demolished, the former stables and a brick cottage still survive from this period.

Designed by Rodney Alsop in 1906, Edrington was built in 1906–1907 for the West Australian pastoralist Samuel Peter Mackay. It is a two-storey red brick example of the English vernacular Art Nouveau style with some reference to the Federation Queen Anne and Federation Arts and Crafts styles. Amongst Alsop's subsequent achievements were the T & G Mutual Life buildings in Melbourne and elsewhere in Australia and New Zealand and the Hackett Memorial Building of the University of Western Australia.

Andrew Spence Chirnside, a brother of Thomas Chirnside, purchased the 405-hectare (1,000-acre) property in 1912 and renamed it Edrington after Edrington castle, a family property in Scotland.

=== Casey family ownership ===
In 1934, the property was passed on to Lady Maie Casey, Chirnside's niece, and her brother, Colonel Rupert Ryan. Ryan also served as the Member for Flinders between 1940 and 1952; and, during 1937–1938, he established an airfield on the estate. On his sudden death in 1952, his interest in Edrington passed to Donn Casey. Through a subsequent subdivision, Edrington became the sole property of Lady Casey. Both Lord Richard Casey and Lady Casey were distinguished Australians. Lady Casey was descended from early Victorian pastoral pioneers and was notable as an artist, author and aviator. Her book, written with others, Early Melbourne Architecture, was seminal in the founding of the National Trust of Australia (Victoria) and the conservation movement in general. Lord Casey served in the First Australian Imperial Force and then worked as a mining engineer. He was the Australian liaison officer in London from 1924. In 1931 he was elected Member for Corio and became Federal Treasurer in 1935 and later Minister for Supply during World War II. His appointment as Minister Plenipotentiary in Washington in 1940 initiated Australia's formal diplomatic representation overseas. He was a member of the British war cabinet and, in 1944, Casey was appointed as the Governor of Bengal. He re-entered federal politics as the inaugural Member for La Trobe in 1949 and was Minister for External Affairs from 1951 to 1960. He was appointed Governor-General of Australia in 1965 after receiving the first life peerage outside the United Kingdom.

The Caseys were responsible for alterations to the house and out-buildings which reflected their interests and lifestyle. Baron Casey died in 1976, and Baroness Casey died in 1983.

=== Subsequent use ===
A 55-hectare (140-acre) site on the estate was repurposed in stages between 1994 and 2004 as the former Berwick campus of Monash University. In March 2016, Monash announced closure of the campus and, following government approvals, the Federation University Australia assumed responsibility for the Berwick campus with effect from January 2018.

The former house at Edrington now forms part of the Edrington Park Retirement Village, located on 50.2 hectares (124 acres).

== Description ==
=== 1850s cottage ===
The site comprises an original 1858 brick cottage in generally good condition, with a locally quarried stone-faced barn (or shed) of similar era. The barn is a substantial structure composed of irregular sandstone blocks with tuckpointed mortar. Two pairs of mezzanine doors are located in the end walls and several small window openings in the side walls. A red brick skillion extends from the centre of the western wall.

=== House ===
The large main Art Nouveau-style residence, built in c. 1906 – c. 1907, is set in a large garden with mature trees and in a high position with sufficient area for protection. The symmetrical house is surrounded by a verandah supported on thick timber posts. Attached to the eastern wall is a gable roofed weatherboard extension, containing kitchen and bathroom. The house features six paned double hung sashes and stretcher coursing with header courses every third layer.

The main house is an externally intact example of a Federation Arts and Crafts mansion, reminiscent of English country villas in the late-nineteenth century and influential in Australian suburban architecture in the 1920s. It contains a mix of architectural motifs including Queen Anne brick-arched porch openings and bungalow features such as the dominant gable roof, clad in French terracotta tiles, stucco, and shingled walls, and boxed multi-paned windows. The interior has been altered over the years, but retains most of the Californian cedar woodwork in the ground floor rooms. The entrance is particularly striking with its exposed wood in the ceiling, rafters, staircase, architraves, and skirting boards. The large arched window off the staircase has coloured leadlight highlights and overlooks the rear garden. It is possible that this feature window originally contained gumnut and eucalyptus leaf stained glass motifs as mentioned in a 1985 report by the Victorian branch of the National Trust. The upstairs bathroom retains its Winderlish-embossed metal wall lining.

=== Garden setting ===
A grand driveway approaches the house from the north and terminates at the entrance to the house with a turning circle. An alternative route circles the rear of the house to provide access to a public carpark once the farm yard area adjacent to the barn and cottage.

Situated in the top of a hill close to the north-east extension of the Berwick main street, Edrington is surrounded by a plantation of oaks, elms, pines and cypresses, appearing as a distinguished landmark from a distance. There are two distinct parts to the garden including orchard and vegetable patch. Examination of the garden in 1980 concluded that it dated from 1906. Details of species contained within the formal garden were recorded in 1986. An assessment of the formal garden during this study describes many of the species as dating from around the 1880s. Particular specimens of importance include a spectacular multi-stemmed deodar cedar (cedrus deodara), a large Bunya-bunya pine (araucaria bidwillii), hoop pine or Moreton Bay pine (araucaria cunninghamii), Douglas fir (pseudotsuga menziesii), Queensland kauri (agathis robusta), macadamia (macadamia integrifolia), variegated smooth-leaved elm (Ulmus minor subsp. minor), Canary Island pine (pinus canariensis), long-leaved Indian pine (pinus roxburghii), saffron cassine (cassine crocea), Algerian oak (quercus canariensis), and a group of Canary Island pines situated in a plantation off the highway, reputed to have been planted by James Gibb.

Since repurposing as a retirement village, several of the rooms were refurbished to accommodate its present function as a community centre for the adjacent Edrington Park Retirement Village. The former servants quarters are now used as beauty salons and have been remodelled internally. The old kitchen scullery is still easily identifiable with its hip ceiling, beaded pin boards and cast iron stove with intact white tile surrounds.

== See also ==
- Architecture of Melbourne
- Casey Airfield
- Federation University Australia, Berwick campus
- List of places on the Victorian Heritage Register in the City of Casey
