= List of places on the Victorian Heritage Register in the City of Casey =

This is a list of places on the Victorian Heritage Register in the City of Casey in Victoria, Australia. The Victorian Heritage Register is maintained by the Heritage Council of Victoria.

As of September 2026, the Victorian Heritage Register listed the following three state-registered places within the City of Casey:

Place name	Place #	Location	Suburb or Town	Co-ordinates	Built	State registered	Photo
Avenue of Honour	H2345	South Gippsland Hwy	Cranbourne	38°06′52″S 145°17′02″E	1918–19	9 April 2015	
Edrington	H0653	6 Melville Park Dr	Berwick	38°02′20″S 145°21′17″E	1906–07	11 March 1987	
Nerre Nerre Warren	H2348	Churchill Park Dr	Endeavour Hills	37°57′08″S 145°14′12″E	1837	14 April 2016	
