= Rupert Ryan =

Australian soldier and politician (1884–1952)

Rupert Ryan CMG, DSO
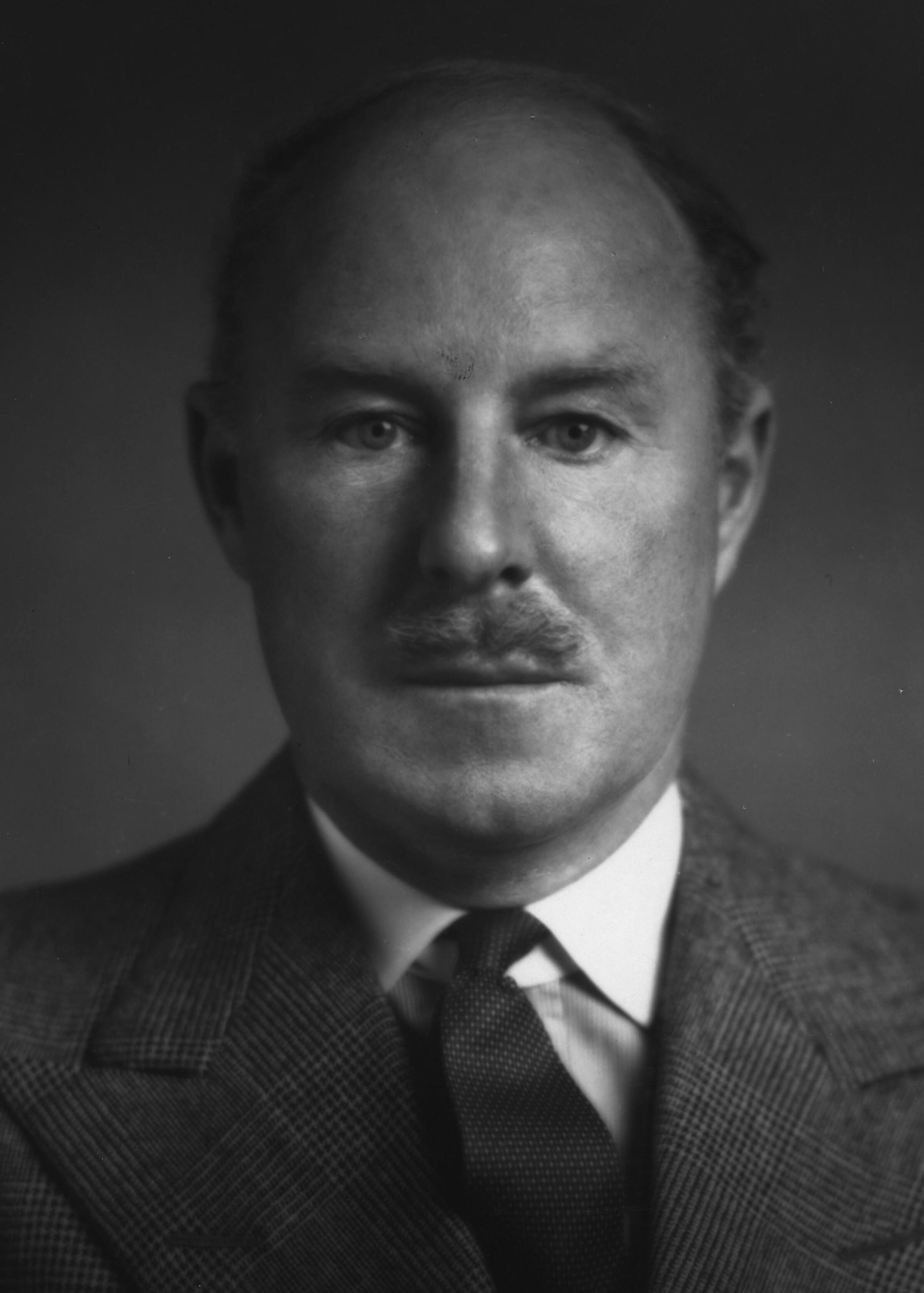
- Ryan in 1941

Member of the Australian Parliament for Flinders
- In office 21 September 1940 – 25 August 1952
- Preceded by: James Fairbairn
- Succeeded by: Keith Ewert

Personal details
- Born: 6 May 1884 Melbourne, Victoria, Australia
- Died: 25 August 1952 (aged 68) Berwick, Victoria, Australia
- Party: UAP (1940–45); Liberal (1945–52)
- Spouse: Rosemary Constance Ferelith (m. 1924; div. 1935)
- Relations: Maie Casey, Baroness Casey (sister)
- Children: 1
- Parents: Sir Charles Snodgrass Ryan (father); Alice Elfrida, née Sumner (mother)
- Education: Geelong Church of England Grammar School; Harrow School; Royal Military Academy, Woolwich
- Occupation: Soldier, landowner

Military service
- Allegiance: United Kingdom; Australia
- Branch/service: British Army (1904–29); Australian Army (1939–40)
- Years of service: 1904–1929; 1939–1940
- Rank: Lieutenant Colonel
- Unit: Royal Artillery
- Battles/wars: First World War; Second World War
- Awards: Companion of the Order of St Michael and St George; Distinguished Service Order; Mentioned in Despatches (6); Knight of the Legion of Honour (France); Gold Rays with Neck Ribbon of the Order of the Sacred Treasure (Japan); Commander of the Military Order of Aviz (Portugal)

Rupert Sumner Ryan CMG DSO (6 May 1884 – 25 August 1952) was an Australian general and politician. He was the son of Sir Charles Snodgrass Ryan, and became a Member of the Australian Parliament for Flinders.

== Early life ==
Ryan was born in Melbourne to surgeon Sir Charles Snodgrass Ryan and Alice Elfrida, née Sumner. He had one sister, Ethel Marian "Maie" Sumner, would later marry Richard Casey. Ryan attended Geelong Church of England Grammar School 1895–98 before travelling to England to complete his education at Harrow School and the Royal Military Academy, Woolwich.

== Military service, pastoral, and political careers ==
In 1904, Ryan was commissioned in the Royal Artillery. At the outset of the First World War, he was stationed on the Western Front. At the end of the war (1918) he was a lieutenant colonel, and was awarded three foreign honours and the Distinguished Service Order in 1918, having been wounded in 1915 in the Battle of Festubert.

Ryan was the chief of staff to the governor of Cologne in 1919, and was shifted to the Inter-Allied Rhineland High Commission headquarters in 1920. He married Lady Rosemary Constance Hay, the daughter of the high commissioner the Earl of Erroll, at the British consulate on 29 May 1924. They had one child, Patrick Vincent Charles Ryan, and divorced in 1935, whereafter he returned to Victoria to Edrington, near Berwick, the property he had inherited with his sister. He and his sister built the station into a very successful Romney Marsh stud; and he also built an airfield on the estate in 1938.

Ryan was appointed a Companion of the Order of St Michael and St George in the 1928 Birthday Honours, and acted as high commissioner following Erroll's death until the end of the occupation. At his retirement from the army in 1929, he became an arms salesman with Vickers Ltd, in which capacity he travelled to Moscow and Bangkok. He resigned in 1934. At the outbreak of the Second World War, Ryan joined the Australian Military Forces, holding administrative posts until 1940, when he was elected to the Australian House of Representatives for Flinders as a member of the United Australia Party.

=== Federal politics and death ===
Ryan was not particularly prominent in Parliament, serving on joint committees on social security (1941–46) and foreign affairs (1952), the latter of which he was the chairman. He was described by Enid Lyons as "a doughty champion of women". Ryan remained in Parliament until his sudden death of cardiac failure on 25 August 1952; he was cremated, and survived by his son.

Parliament of Australia
Preceded by James Fairbairn	Member for Flinders; 1940–1952	Succeeded by Keith Ewert
