= Suzanne Cory High School =

Location
- 225 Hoppers Lane, Werribee, Melbourne, Victoria; Australia; 37°53′23″S 144°42′1″E

Information
- Type: Government-funded mixed-sex academically selective secondary day school
- Motto: Purpose In Every Pursuit
- Established: 2011; 15 years ago
- Sister school: National Junior College
- Oversight: Department of Education and Early Childhood Development
- Principal: Martha Goodridge-Kelly
- Years: 9–12
- Enrolment: 885 (2019)
- Houses: Blackwood, Apollo (formerly Cottrell), Kororoit, Rothwell
- Colours: Green, orange, and black
- Newspaper: Suzanne Cory High School (newsletter)
- Yearbook: Aurantiacus
- Affiliation: Victoria University; University of Melbourne
- Website: www.suzannecoryhs.vic.edu.au

Suzanne Cory High School (abbreviated as SCHS) is a government-funded mixed-sex academically selective secondary day school located in Werribee, in the western region of Melbourne, Australia. The school caters for students from Year 9 to Year 12. Enrolment is offered to those having reached a high aptitude in the annual selective entry high schools entrance examination run by the Department of Education and Early Childhood Development.

== Overview ==
The school was established in 2011 with two hundred inaugural Year 9 students. In 2014, the school, for the first time, accommodated a full cohort of eight hundred students, ranging from Years 9 to 12. It is one of two additional selective high schools in Victoria, alongside Nossal High School, that were established as the result of a government policy of expansion, increasing the number of fully selective government schools in Victoria to 4. Prior to the addition of these schools, Mac.Robertson Girls' High School and Melbourne High School were the sole academic selective entry schools in Victoria.

Located in the suburb of Werribee, the school is in close proximity to Werribee Mercy Hospital and Hoppers Crossing railway station. Suzanne Cory High School is situated adjacent to Victoria University, giving students access to university facilities, programs, and academic staff.

The school is named in honour of Australian biologist Suzanne Cory. In tribute to Cory, the school logo depicts a gene strand, the aurantiacus, which was discovered by her.

== Enrolment ==
Entry into selective schools is competitive. In 2011, exclusively 955 places were available for over 5000 applicants. Students in their second year of secondary schooling are eligible to sit a three hour long examination which measures aptitude in six component tests: numerical reasoning, verbal reasoning, reading comprehension, mathematics, creative writing, and analytical writing. The DET allows a maximum of five percent of Year 8 students from any given Australian school to be admitted into four selective schools: Mac.Robertson Girls' High School, Melbourne High School, Nossal High School, and Suzanne Cory High School. However, five percent of enrolments are filled through the Principal's Discretion Category. Students who are denied first round offers are given a chance to be seated in an interview. Over one hundred applicants are placed in this interview for less than twenty positions. In addition, the 'Equity Considerations policy', adapted by the DET allows ten percent of Year 9 enrolments to be filled through this manner. Students with Aboriginal or Torres Strait Islander backgrounds or students whose parents have a Commonwealth Health Care Card are eligible under this policy.

== Campus ==
The campus, located in Melbourne's west, is a multi-story facility that comprises the main building, the outer agora, the car park, the oval, the gym and the various courts. The main building is styled in toned greys and oranges, intending to convey a lava drip effect.

Tours for the campus occur on a bi-weekly basis on a Tuesday. The first hour of the tour consists of a campus walkthrough with a student ambassador(s), followed by a meet and greet with member(s) of the principal team. Tours are conducted during school hours, where viewers will be able to see live classes happen in real time as they are guided through the various wings of the main building.

Associated with each of the wings are specific subjects, and a name;

- T Wing, resides on the first floor and is home to the music, arts and tech subjects of the school. As it walls up against the agora, musical activities such as "open mics" occur outside of the T wing rooms. Rooms within this wing are indicated by the prefix "T" and range from T1 to T8, with T5 having an extension called T5A. This wing also contains the auditorium which is where school-wide assemblies are held on bi-weekly Mondays. The kitchen is also present in this wing and is connected to the only room to not follow a standardized pattern, opting for rows rather than the individual tables seen in the other setups.
- S Wing, resides on the first floor and is home to the sciences. This wing contains science rooms which have lab coats, and access to a gas line for bunsen burner functionality. The science rooms are arranged in a different pattern from the standard 26 seater arrangement, with the rooms comfortably holding 24 students giving the students much more space.
- Upstairs is home to all the miscellaneous subjects not linked to the ones listed above, such as the humanities and math.

== Academics ==
=== Curriculum ===
The design incorporates ICT arrangements for eLearning.

=== VCE acceleration ===
The majority of students undertake VCE starting in Year 11. However, the school allows Year 11 students to voluntarily undertake a unit 3/4 VCE subject. This strategy is similar to the Select Entry Accelerated Learning one year early VCE plan, which enables students to become more prepared for VCE, with the intention to gain higher outcomes. In 2013, 178 of the school's 200 inaugural Year 11 students completed one or more unit 3/4 subjects.

=== Academic results ===
Many of the inaugural group of year twelve students completed unit 3/4 VCE studies in 2013. The median study score was 36 and the percentage of students attaining a study score of 40 or above was twenty-four percent. These first VCE results placed Suzanne Cory High School within the top twenty-five highest performing schools in the state in 2013.

Suzanne Cory High School was ranked sixth out of all state secondary schools in Victoria based on VCE results in 2018.

Suzanne Cory High School academic results
Year	Students enrolled in VCE	Median study score	% Study scores 40+
2013	184	36	23.9
2014	351	34	15.3
2015	365	34	17.1
2016	379	34	15.5
2017	403	35	19.7
2018	427	34	18.3
2019	452	34	14.6
2020	446	34	19.0
2021	451	34	17.2

== Student life ==
=== House system ===
All students at Suzanne Cory High School are allocated to one of four houses upon entry to the school. Each of the four houses is named after a mountain in the western region of Victoria. All the houses are associated with a colour, mascot, and badge.

- Blackwood – Horse and knight motifs
- Apollo (formerly Cottrell) – Phoenix motif
- Kororoit – Dragon motif
- Rothwell – Griffin motif

The house program involves a number of whole school competitions in several different domains including sports, debating, and music. This includes whole school events such as an athletics carnival, house chorals, and participation in charitable events such as the Relay for Life and World's Greatest Shave. Students earn house points through the school values card system by demonstrating the school's prescribed values of respect, aspiration, and contribution. These are also earned by students in class, through co-curricular involvement, or outside of class.

Associated with each house is a wing of the main building, with Blackwood taking the "T Wing", Apollo (formerly Cottrell) the "S Wing", and Kororoit and Rothwell sharing the upstairs areas, with the rooms being indicated by a G prefix. House assemblies involve students participating in house activities within their house wing, receiving per-house news and for practising the schools mass singing program.

=== Sports ===
Within the school there are various sporting opportunities that students are encouraged to become involved in. Sport is a compulsory subject for Year 9 and 10 students, in addition to practical physical education requirements.

In addition to the sports program, whole school opportunities such as the school swimming and athletics carnivals are held in the first term. These events set a platform for the school's culture and application of the core values. The school's house program is also used as a vehicle through lunch time sporting competitions where the students participate for their house in various team sports.

At the inter-school sport level, students participate in a wide range of sports against other schools in the Wyndham region. If successful, winning teams represent Wyndham against other schools in the Western Metropolitan Region.

=== Affiliations ===
Suzanne Cory High School is linked with the University of Melbourne and Victoria University, and students from Suzanne Cory sometimes are permitted to use facilities from the two universities.

Suzanne Cory High School also maintains its affiliations with the other selective schools in Victoria. Notably, the school has strong ties with Nossal High School. The relationship is unique in that the two schools are the only wholly selective co-educational high schools in Victoria. The schools engage annually in the Terry Bennett Cup, a friendly inter-school competition between year 9 students. The schools interchange each year to host the competition.

Music and Mass Singing

Suzanne Cory High School has a focus on Music, with Mass Singing being frequent throughout the week, and a Chorals programme taking place in April-June.

the School Song "Purpose In Every Pursuit" can be found here.

== Staff ==
- Principal, Martha Goodridge-Kelly
- 68.2 teaching staff (on an FTE basis)
- 19.3 non-teaching staff (on an FTE basis)

== Past principals ==
Ordinal	Principal	Period	Time length
1	Peter Starford	2011–2013	4 years
3	Colin Axup	2015–2021	7 years
4	Martha Goodridge-Kelly	2022-present	4 years

== See also ==
- List of schools in Victoria, Australia
