= Avenue of Honour, Cranbourne =

Heritage-listed avenue of tress and war memorial in Melbourne, Victoria, Australia

- Location of the avenue in Greater Metropolitan Melbourne
- Interactive map of Avenue of Honour, Cranbourne
- 38°06′52″S 145°17′02″E
- Type: Avenue of oak trees
- Location: South Gippsland Highway, Cranbourne, City of Casey, Melbourne, Victoria, Australia

History
- Official dedication: 9 August 1919
- Founded: 1918; 108 years ago
- Founder: Cranbourne Shire Council

Site notes
- Condition: c. 172 trees planted were extant (as of November 2001)
- Management: VicRoads

Victorian Heritage Register
- Official name: Avenue of Honour
- Type: Registered place
- Criteria: a., e.
- Designated: 9 April 2015
- Reference no.: H2345
- Heritage overlay no.: HO142
- Categories: Military; Monuments and Memorials; Parks, Gardens and Trees

The Avenue of Honour is a memorial avenue of oak trees located on the South Gippsland Highway in Cranbourne, in the City of Casey, in the outer eastern suburbs of Melbourne, in Victoria, Australia.

Planted between 1918 and 1919 as a World War I memorial on the traditional lands of the Bunurong people, the avenue was added to the Victorian Heritage Register on 9 April 2015 in recognition of its historical and aesthetic significance.

Additional trees were subsequently planted, in honour of those who served in later conflicts. As of November 2001, there were 172 oak trees in the avenue.

== History ==
Since the early 1900s, commemorative avenues of trees have been planted in Australia and internationally to honour those who have served in wartime. During and after World War I, avenues of honour were particularly popular in Victoria with some 218 memorial avenues planted throughout the state. Victoria has the largest number of avenues of honour of any state or territory in Australia.

An avenue of honour at Cranbourne was first proposed by the Cranbourne Patriotic Association in June 1918 as both a memorial and landscape improvement for the town. After initial deferment by the Cranbourne Shire Council, an avenue of honour was planned the following year and unveiled on 9 August 1919 by the Shire of Cranbourne President Councillor D. McGregor. The selected route was along the South Gippsland Highway, commencing at the Shire Hall and lining the road past the primary school (since relocated) which had been attended by many of the servicemen and women. By 1919, between fifty nine and sixty seven (Note: The number of trees planted varies from source-to-source. 67 is repeatedly cited by the Victorian Heritage Register. However, the City of Casey stated that initially 59 trees were planted.) commemorative trees, of various oak species, were planted to represent the men and two nursing sisters from the Cranbourne district who served in World War I. Trees in the avenue have no individual identification. It appears that name plaques were not produced and a list associating servicemen and women with particular trees has not been located. An associated war memorial was erected in c. 2000.

Additional trees were planted in September 1951 in memory of those who served in World War II; and subsequently. As of October 2013, the inscription on the plaque read:

Avenue of Honour
1914 – 1918
1939 – 1945
Cranbourne
A living memorial
Lest We Forget

As of November 2001, the City of Casey reported that the avenue contained 172 trees, some of which are the original mature trees, and others, much younger.

== Description ==
The avenue initially comprised between 57 and 65 oak trees, and subsequently increased to 172, which are a collection of English oak (Quercus robur), Algerian oak (Quercus canariensis). and hybrid oak (Quercus canariensis x Quercus robur).

Planted on the South Gippsland Highway, the avenue begins at Sladen Street and runs approximately 350 metres (1,150 ft) to the south-east. An associated war memorial was originally placed at the commencement of the avenue however this was subsequently relocated. A recent stone memorial with timber shelter is located within the Avenue of Honour, on the eastern side of the South Gippsland Highway. It contains plaques which list the names of 87 men and women from the district who served in World War I. These names were taken from the District Roll of Honour and do not relate to specific trees.

== See also ==
- Avenue of honour
- Military history of Australia
- List of places on the Victorian Heritage Register in the City of Casey
