= Nossal High School =

- The main building of Nossal High School

Location
- Berwick, Melbourne, Victoria; Australia; 38°2′21″S 145°20′14″E

Information
- Type: Government-funded mixed-sex academically selective secondary day school
- Motto: Embrace the Challenge
- Established: 2010; 16 years ago
- Founder: Government of Victoria
- Sister school: Chosei High School
- Educational authority: Department of Education
- Principal: Tracey Mackin
- Years: 9–12
- Enrolment: 832
- Campus: Suburban
- Houses: Garuda, Griffin, Phoenix, Pegasus
- Colours: Black, ecru and rust
- Song: Embrace the Challenge
- Newspaper: Nossal News (fortnightly newsletter)
- Yearbook: The Butterfly Effect
- Affiliations: Federation University; Monash University; Chisholm Institute
- Namesake: Sir Gustav Nossal
- Website: www.nossalhs.vic.edu.au

Nossal High School, also referred to as Nossal or NHS, is a government-funded mixed-sex academically selective secondary day school, located in the Melbourne suburb of Berwick, Victoria, Australia. The school (named after Sir Gustav Nossal, a prominent Australian immunologist and 2000 Australian of the Year) was established in 2010 and enrolls students in Year 9 to Year 12.

The school's curriculum follows American educator Howard Gardener's concept of the Five Minds of the Future which includes, for example, the absence of school bells, as students are expected to know when and where to be. Students have access to many extra-curricular programs, such as inter-school sport, debating, music, clubs/societies and various national and international competitions and creative-based events such as the Model United Nations Assembly and the Australian Computational and Linguistics Olympiad.

As Nossal High School is part of the Select-Entry Network of Victorian selective schools (alongside Suzanne Cory High School, Mac.Robertson Girls' High School and Melbourne High School), prospective students must sit a 3-hour-long uniform entrance examination, testing their knowledge and reasoning in literacy and numeracy, with the 2017 exam attracting about 3,300 applicants; accepting only around 208 students into their Year 9 cohort.

Nossal High School was ranked third out of all state secondary schools in Victoria based on Victorian Certificate of Education results in 2018.

== History ==
=== Beginnings ===
Prior to the school's opening in 2010, the only selective schools in Victoria were the MacRobertson Girls' High School and Melbourne High School, both catering for single-sex education, as well as the arts-focused Victorian College of the Arts Secondary School.

The Victorian Government's decision to create a new selective school was based on a number of factors, such as to expand the ability for more gifted students to have a selective school education, as MacRobertson and Melbourne High were located in or around the Melbourne city centre, placing a significant transport and logistical problem for prospective students who lived in the outer suburbs, and the notion that elite education had to be linked with gender segregation was beginning to be seen as more and more archaic in the twenty-first century.

Thus, during the 2006 Victorian election, the Liberal Party and Labor Party both pledged to build new selective schools, despite the fact that Education Minister Lynne Kosky had previously argued against building more selective schools in the early 2000s.

The Labor Party was re-elected, and in April 2008, the government of Victoria announced that a new selective school would be established in the south-east suburb of Berwick. At the same time, similar announcements were made to establish a selective school in Werribee (to become Suzanne Cory High School) and a science-specialist school in the Monash University Clayton campus (to become John Monash Science School); Berwick was prioritised, however, partially since the City of Casey, which it forms part of, was announced as Melbourne's fastest-growing municipality.

Senior Department bureaucrats were tasked with making local connections and setting up plans for the eventual opening of the provisionally-named Berwick Selective Entry High School. Construction works began in the Berwick campus of Monash University (now the Berwick campus of Federation University) in 2009, at the site of the former Casey Airfields, and the inaugural principal, Roger Page, was appointed the same year.

Nossal High School was finally opened in 2010, the first-ever joint Select-Entry Network entrance examination held only six months prior. Due to incomplete school facilities, Nossal students initially undertook study in the adjacent Monash University campus; the Jean Russell Centre, a professional development and function/meeting room in the school was opened in Term 3 in 2010. The school's first-ever cohort of Year 9s were admitted in 2010, each year level eventually being added on a yearly-basis; the school reached full capacity in 2013, the year when the first-ever Year 12 cohort graduated from the school. In this year, inaugural Assistant Principal, Toni Meath, left the school to become Principal of Mac.Rob.

=== Later development ===
In January 2021, Nossal High School's science teacher Lisa Marie Mandeltort (27 July 1991 - 13 January 2021) drowned at Venus Bay after saving two people from drowning in a rip.

At the end of 2022, it was announced that inaugural principal Roger Page would step down and that Tracey Mackin would serve as interim Acting Principal until Page officially retired.

== Grounds, buildings & facilities ==
Nossal High School has a single campus in Berwick, which comprises three buildings - these are the Main Building (also known as Building A), the Sports and Performing Arts Building (also known as Building B), and the Fitness Centre.

The Main Building is a double-storey building that was built between 2009 and 2010. It was the first building on the campus to be built. The ground floor contains the school's canteen, library, wellbeing offices and IT support rooms, as well as some 2D and 3D modelling studios, and the common rooms for the Garuda and Griffin houses. The upper floor contains the science, technology and physics rooms, a few study spaces, and the common rooms for the Pegasus and Phoenix houses. The upper floor is also home to the Jean Russell Centre, which hosts development talks.

The Sports and Performing Arts Building is a single-storey building that was finished in 2011. It contains the Meath Auditorium which was named after Nossal's first Assistant Principal, Toni Meath. It also contains a Gym, some changing rooms, a small kitchen and some music rooms.

The Fitness Centre is located behind the Sports and Performing Arts Building. It contains the Multipurpose Area, which is used as a teaching space, but is also used by students who wish to play table tennis at lunchtime. It also contains the Weights Room, which has special equipment, such as dumbbells and exercise bikes. Use of the Weights Room is only open to students who complete a special induction program before signing a User Agreement.

In addition to these buildings, the school's campus also includes four basketball courts, an oval and a rectangular soccer field, as well as a small vegetable garden behind the Main Building.

== Logo & motto ==
=== Logo ===
The logo of Nossal High School depicts two books that cross together to form a butterfly, with a third, smaller book forming the butterfly's antennae. The logo is made of three colours: ecru, rust and yellow.

The books represent academic study, while the butterfly symbolises emerging from a chrysalis into the future. The butterfly is also a reference to the fact that the school was built on grounds that were formerly part of Casey Airfield.

=== Motto ===
The school's motto is "Embrace the Challenge". According to Nossal High School, this statement was presented to the school's first students at the first Foundation Assembly in 2010.

The motto became the title of the school song, which was first performed at Melbourne Town Hall on 29 November 2022 as part of Speech Night.

== Co-curricular activities ==
=== Clubs and societies ===
Clubs and societies at Nossal High School are required to be affiliated with the Nossal Societies Union (NSU) in order to be recognised by the school and eligible for funding. The NSU's formation in 2017 consolidated the roles of the SRC and the clubs/societies themselves. The NSU is led by two Presidents.

Each club/society is led by one or more students; a 'Supporting Teacher' chosen by each club/society aids it in its operation and liaises with certain persons and/or organisations when it would be more appropriate for a teacher to do so. Some NSU affiliates provide for additional positions within the organisational structure.

=== Instrumental program ===
Nossal High School has various musical ensembles for students, as well as an in-school musical tutoring program. All ensembles have weekly rehearsals at set times, throughout the year. If students are undergoing in-school musical tutoring, they are required to join a relevant musical ensemble. These ensembles can perform at various school events, such as assemblies and the annual Speech Night, as well as out-of-school events, such as the Victorian School Music Festival. The Wind Symphony is Nossal's main performing ensemble.

Name	By Audition/Open to all students
Big Band	By audition
Choir	Open to all students
Flute Ensemble	Open to all students
Guitar Ensemble	Open to all students
Jazz Combo	By audition
Percussion Ensemble	Open to all students
Saxophone Ensemble	Open to all students
String Orchestra	Open to all students
String Quartet	By selection
Wind Symphony	Open to all students

== Organisation ==
=== Extracurricular activities ===
Extracurricular options available to students include: Literature Circle, Chess Club, Debating, Knitting and Environmental activities. Students are also able to join in many sport teams including volleyball, cricket, badminton, table tennis, basketball, soccer, softball, football, hockey, swimming, athletics, cross country, netball and tennis.

==== Page Cup ====
At the end of each year, the house to have accumulated the most points is awarded the Page Cup. Points are attained by participation in the six major events as well as smaller contests held throughout the school year. The six major events are as follows: Swimming Carnival; Athletics; Cross Country; House Performing Arts Festival (commonly referred to as 'HPAF'); Debating; NERD (Nossal Extended Research Directory) Project (year 9 participation only). Other competitions include Table Tennis, Camp Challenges, Dress Up days, Tug of War and Chess Competitions.

==== Monash Grand Challenge ====
The Monash Grand Challenge is a competition held for Year 9 students at the end of every school year; the winners gain significant numbers of points contributing to next year's Page Cup. The challenge focuses on developing essay writing, creative, public speaking and problem solving skills by incorporating each element into the challenge. The final products of each house are judged by Monash University professors and the winner is decided upon by a vote. The winning house gains the Monash Grand Challenge trophy and house points.

== Relations with other schools ==
=== In Australia ===
Nossal High School has maintained relationships with the other select-entry schools in Victoria and have arranged student exchanges with Suzanne Cory High School and MacRobertson Girls High School. Nossal has also competed against the other selective schools in sport competitions.

=== In other countries ===
Nossal has been a sister school of Chosei High School, located in Chiba Prefecture, Japan, since 2014. The affiliation includes student exchanges each year, cultural liaison and professional and staff development. The partnership with Chosei was chosen taking into consideration Nossal's offering of Japanese as a VCE subject, as well as Australia's strategic position in the Asia-Pacific.

Nossal High School has also arranged student exchanges with Collège Félix le Dantec in Lannion, Brittany, France. Nossal's former principal Roger Page expressed support for establishing a sister school partnership with Félix le Dantec.

== Principals ==
The following individuals have served as principal of Nossal High School:

Ordinal	Officeholder	Term start	Term end	Time in office	Notes
1	Roger Page	2010	2023	15–16 years	Founding Principal
2	Tracey Mackin	2024	-	Ongoing	

== Controversies & incidents ==
=== Hoax bomb threats ===
In 2016, numerous schools around Australia were subject to fake bomb threats over the phone and it was initially thought by some that the caller had come from Nossal High School. It was later revealed that Israeli-American teenager Michael Kadar was responsible for the bomb threats in Australia, and that he had also made threats in several other countries. He was sentenced to 10 years in prison.

=== Sexting ===
In 2019, it emerged that Australian jazz musician James Mustafa, who worked at Nossal High School as a director of music, had sent 150 sexual text messages to a student. He pleaded guilty to one count of encouraging a minor to engage in sexual activity and was sentenced to two years of community service, with his name being added to the sex offender registry.

=== Sexually explicit group chats ===
In 2021, controversy erupted when it was discovered that several Nossal students were in a group chat that allegedly sexually objectified women. Australian model Maria Thattil called out the group chat after she was added to it by accident. Principal Roger Page said that the school had zero tolerance for the behaviour and said that they would be investigating. Thattil later gave a speech at the school.

In 2022, another group chat was allegedly found. Thattil commented that she was “absolutely disgusted and disappointed to see that students of Nossal High School are behind yet another misogynistic, sexist, sexually violent and transphobic group chat”.

== See also ==
- List of schools in Victoria, Australia
