= Avenue of honour =

Australian road and war memorial

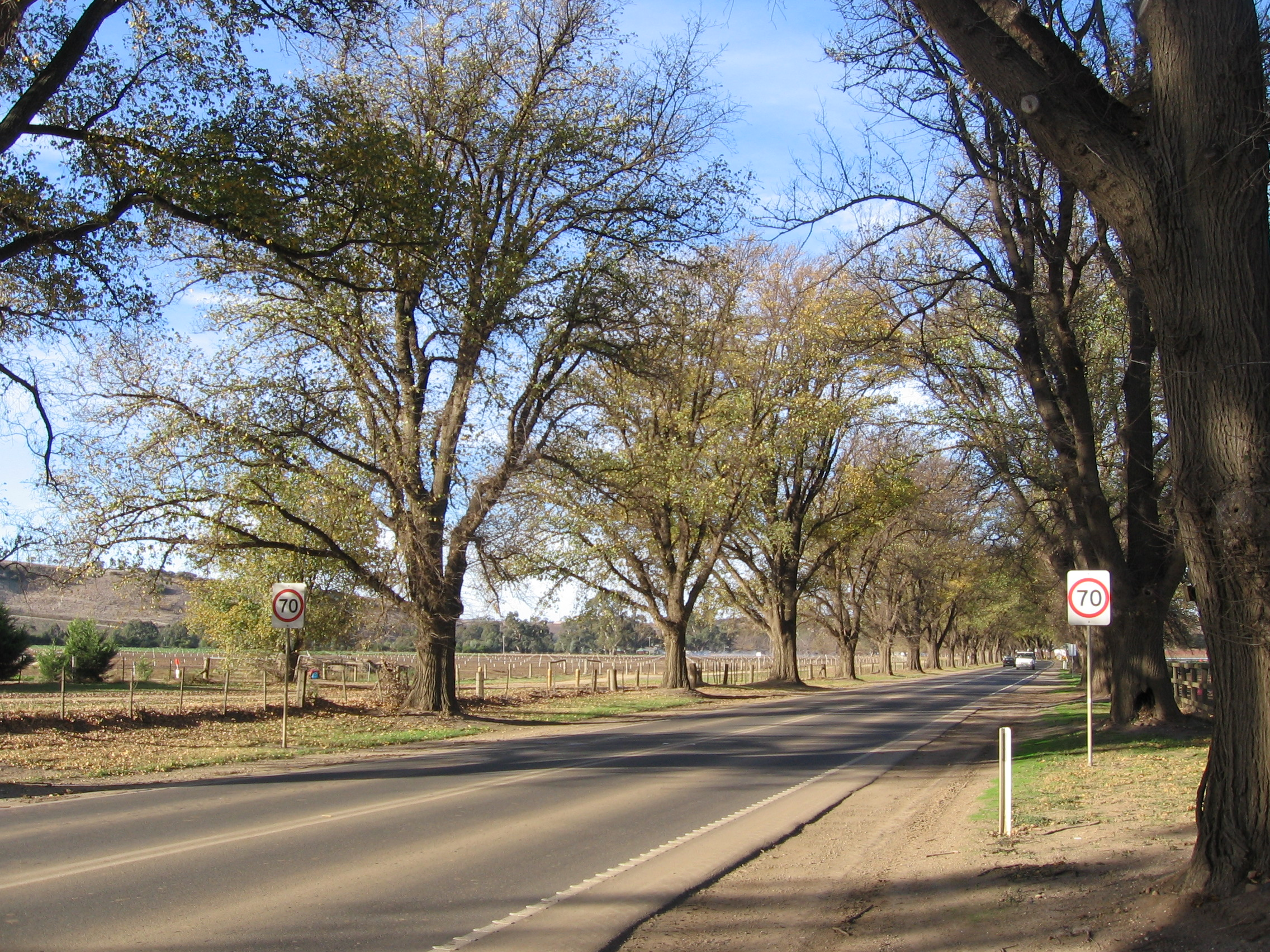
The Avenue of Honour in Bacchus Marsh

An Avenue of honour is a memorial avenue of trees, with each tree symbolising a person. The tradition, which originated in the Goldfields region of Victoria, Australia, is an important part of Australian culture. There are 547 known avenues of honour in Australia, in all states and territories except the Northern Territory; of which over half are in Victoria.

== Description ==
Most avenues are in remembrance of those who fought or died in war, particularly World War I (1914–1918), although the earliest recorded avenues were planted in remembrance of Australia's participation in the Second Boer War (1899-1902). Since soldiers were grouped by the place they were recruited, a military defeat often meant all of the men of eligible age from the town were killed in the same battle. Many of the avenue's trees include metal plaques naming the victims.

Planted in the first quarter of the twentieth century, many of these avenues feature large, established trees and exotic species.

== Locations ==
=== Australia ===
==== New South Wales ====
Suburb / Town	Street address	Year planted	Conflict honoured	Planting	Notes	Image
Cowra						
Manly Vale	King Street	2005	Merchant Navy personnel in WWI & WWII			
O'Connell						

==== Queensland ====
Suburb / Town	Street address	Year planted	Conflict honoured	Planting	Notes	Image
Yungaburra						

==== Tasmania ====
Suburb / Town	Street address	Year planted	Conflict honoured	Planting	Notes	Image
Hobart						

==== Victoria ====
Several of these avenues are listed on the Victorian Heritage Register; most others are afforded local levels of heritage protection through the various Local government in Australia and the Victorian branch of the National Trust; however, many such avenues have since been affected by road development.

An online project titled "Avenues of Honour 1915-2015" was established by Treenet, the urban tree research and education organisation based at the University of Adelaide's Waite Arboretum.

Suburb / Town	Street address	Year planted	Conflict honoured	Planting	Notes	Image
Addington						
Anglesea				Flowering gums (corymbia ficifolia): 72 planted, only 3–4 remain		
Bacchus Marsh	Bacchus Marsh Road	1918	WWI	Dutch Elms: 281 trees were simultaneously planted on the call of a bugle; listed on the Victorian Heritage Register		
Ballarat	Arch of Victory			The longest avenue, being 22 kilometres (14 mi) long and containing 3,912 trees, listed on the Victorian Heritage Register		
Ballarat East	Victoria Street			A lesser-known avenue, once marked the eastern entrance to Ballarat. A handful of trees remain on one side of the road, the rest having been removed, most during construction of the rail flyover in the 1960s		
Ballarat Orphanage	Arthur Kenny Avenue					
Booroopki						
Buchan South						
Cranbourne	South Gippsland Highway	1918–1919	WWI; WWII (later)	Oaks: between 57 and 67, added to the Victorian Heritage Register; and as of November 2001, 172 oak trees were extant, with the additional trees planted in honour of those who fought in subsequent conflicts		
Daylesford						
Digby						
Eurack				Listed on the Victorian Heritage Register		
Hotspur						
Kingston						
Kongwak						
Lakes Entrance						
Lysterfield						
Macedon						
Macedon Ranges	Macedon-Woodend Road					
Macleod	Mont Park Asylum	1919	WWI	Flowering gums		
	Strzelecki Avenue		WWI			
Wandin North				Flowering gums		
Woodend North						

==== Western Australia ====
Suburb / Town	Street address	Year planted	Conflict honoured	Planting	Notes	Image
Albany						
Armadale						
Kings Park	May Drive|Lovekin Drive|Marri Walk					

== See also ==
- Military history of Australia
