= The Young Kabbarli =

Australian opera

- Chamber opera by Margaret Sutherland
- Librettist: Maie Casey
- Language: English
- Premiere: August 1965; Theatre Royal in Hobart

The Young Kabbarli is a one-act chamber opera written in 1964 by the Australian composer Margaret Sutherland; it is her only work in the operatic genre. The libretto was by Maie Casey, based on poetry by Judith Wright and Shaw Neilson.

The plot is based on an episode in the life of the Irish-Australian welfare worker and anthropologist Daisy Bates. Bates was given the affectionate name 'Kabbarli', meaning 'grandmotherly person'.

The Young Kabbarli has four singing roles (soprano, mezzo-soprano, tenor, bass) and three non-singing roles.

It is scored for 2 flutes, 2 clarinets, bassoon, horn, percussion (castanets, wood block, sticks, flints, wooden shaker), piano, viola, and double bass.

The Young Kabbarli was premiered in August 1965 at the Festival of Contemporary Opera and Music, at the Theatre Royal in Hobart, as a companion piece to Larry Sitsky's The Fall of the House of Usher. Sitsky's piece was well-received, Sutherland's less so.

It received performances by the State Opera of South Australia in Adelaide and in Melbourne in 1972.

The Young Kabbarli was recorded in 1973 at Flinders University, Adelaide. It was the first Australian opera recorded in Australia, and it was the first quadraphonic disc made in Australia. The singers were Genty Stevens, mezzo-soprano, Daisy Bates/Kabbarli; Dean Patterson, baritone, Goondowell; Carol Kohler, soprano, Goondowell's wife Yoolbian; John McKenzie, bass-baritone, Trappist Brother; David Gulpilil (as David Gumpilil), Aboriginal singer; New Opera of South Australia, conducted by Patrick Thomas.
