= Charles Ryan (surgeon) =

Australian surgeon (1853–1926)

Sir Charles Snodgrass Ryan
- Born: 20 September 1853; Longwood, Victoria
- Died: 23 October 1926 (aged 73) near Adelaide, South Australia
- Burial place: Melbourne General Cemetery
- Relatives: Rupert Ryan (son); Maie Casey, Baroness Casey (daughter)
- Military career
- Allegiance: Ottoman Empire (1876–78); Australia (1878–1919)
- Branch: Ottoman Army; Australian Military Forces
- Service years: 1876–1919
- Rank: Major General
- Nickname: "Plevna"
- Conflicts: Serbo-Turkish War; Russo-Turkish War; Siege of Plevna; First World War; Gallipoli Campaign
- Awards: Knight Commander of the Order of the British Empire; Companion of the Order of the Bath; Companion of the Order of St Michael and St George; Colonial Auxiliary Forces Officers' Decoration; Mentioned in Despatches; Order of the Medjidie (Ottoman Empire); Order of Osmanieh (Ottoman Empire)

Major General Sir Charles Snodgrass Ryan, KBE, CB, CMG, VD (20 September 1853 – 23 October 1926) was an Australian surgeon and army officer.

== Early life ==
Ryan was born at Killeen station, Longwood, Victoria, second son of Charles Ryan, an Irish overlander from New South Wales who founded the stock and station firm of Ryan & Hammond, and his wife Marian, daughter of John Cotton, a British poet, ornithological writer and artist, who became an early pastoral settler in Victoria, Australia. Ryan was educated at the Melbourne Church of England Grammar School, and subsequently at the University of Melbourne, as a student of medicine; afterwards he proceeded to Edinburgh, where he graduated in medicine and surgery, and took the degrees of Bachelor of Medicine and Master of Surgery. He then travelled on the Continent and studied medicine in France, Austria, and Italy.

== In Turkey ==
In September 1876, Ryan entered the Turkish service, and was forthwith sent to Nisch, where he was placed in charge of a large hospital during the Serbian war. He was afterwards sent to the Orchanie Balkans in charge of 3000 Turkish soldiers, and from there was ordered to march to Widdin, although still suffering from a severe attack of dysentery. He reached that place in ten days, having nearly died from exhaustion on the road. While in Widdin he was present during nine bombardments. From Widdin he proceeded with Osman Pacha to Plevna, which he gained after marching for three successive days and nights, and was present at the first battle of that memorable conflict, being the only doctor on the field. He was in the Turkish ranks at the great action of 31 July. On 8 September his horse was shot under him, and his attendant killed by his side, while riding into one of the Turkish redoubts, which was about to be attacked by Russian general Michael Skobeleff. At the battle of Gravitza he entered one of the redoubts captured by the Turks from the Russians, and on the Turks, in their turn, being expelled from this redoubt, Dr. Ryan was the last to leave it, which he did leading his horse, on which he had placed two Turkish soldiers whose legs were broken. In this plight he returned to Plevna, a distance of six miles, for the first two miles of which he was exposed to a very heavy fire. He next accompanied the expedition to Loftcha. On 18 October Ryan left Plevna for Constantinople, and was sent to Erzeroum as head of an ambulance. Here he remained four months in charge of a hospital. During this period the city was besieged by the Russians for six weeks, and for four weeks Dr. Ryan was suffering from a severe attack of typhus, which disease carried off twenty-two out of thirty-six surgeons in Erzeroum, more than sixteen thousand Turkish soldiers dying from it and from dysentery. For his services during the war he received the Order of the Medjidie of the fourth class, the Order of Osmanieh of the third class, and the war medal. During his month and a half at Gallipoli, Ryan photographed various locations on the Peninsula, as well as key Australian military personnel.

== Appointments ==
As a colonel, Ryan was appointed principal medical officer, Victoria, in 1902; and honorary physician to the governor-general in 1904. At the outbreak of the First World War in 1914, Ryan became assistant director of medical services, 1st Division, Australian Imperial Force. He sailed for Egypt in October and was appointed to the staff of Lieutenant General Sir William Birdwood. On landing at Gallipoli he faced an enemy whose country he had served nearly forty years before. Ryan contracted Typhoid fever in June 1915 and was evacuated to Egypt and later to England. From July 1916 he served in London as consulting surgeon, medical headquarters staff, AIF, and achieved a reputation for his toughness on medical boards. Ryan was appointed honorary surgeon-general, Australian Military Forces, in August 1917 and returned to Australia in May 1919. In July 1919 he was placed on the retired list with the honorary rank of major general. Ryan had received the Companion of the Order of the Bath in 1916, Companion of the Order of St Michael and St George and Knight Commander of the Order of the British Empire in 1919.

== Personal life ==
Ryan married on 5 July 1883, Alice Elfrida, daughter of the Hon. Theodotus Sumner, M.L.C., of Stony Park, Brunswick, Victoria. They had a son, Rupert Ryan who became a soldier and Federal politician; and a daughter, Ethel Marian Sumner Ryan, a pioneer aviator and poet who married Richard Casey, Baron Casey.

His sister was the noted botanical painter Ellis Rowan.

Ryan died at sea, on board the Otranto, near Adelaide, while on a return voyage from Europe on 23 October 1926.
