= Wilson Botanic Park =

Park in Victoria, Australia

Coordinates: 38.0251°S 145.3401°E

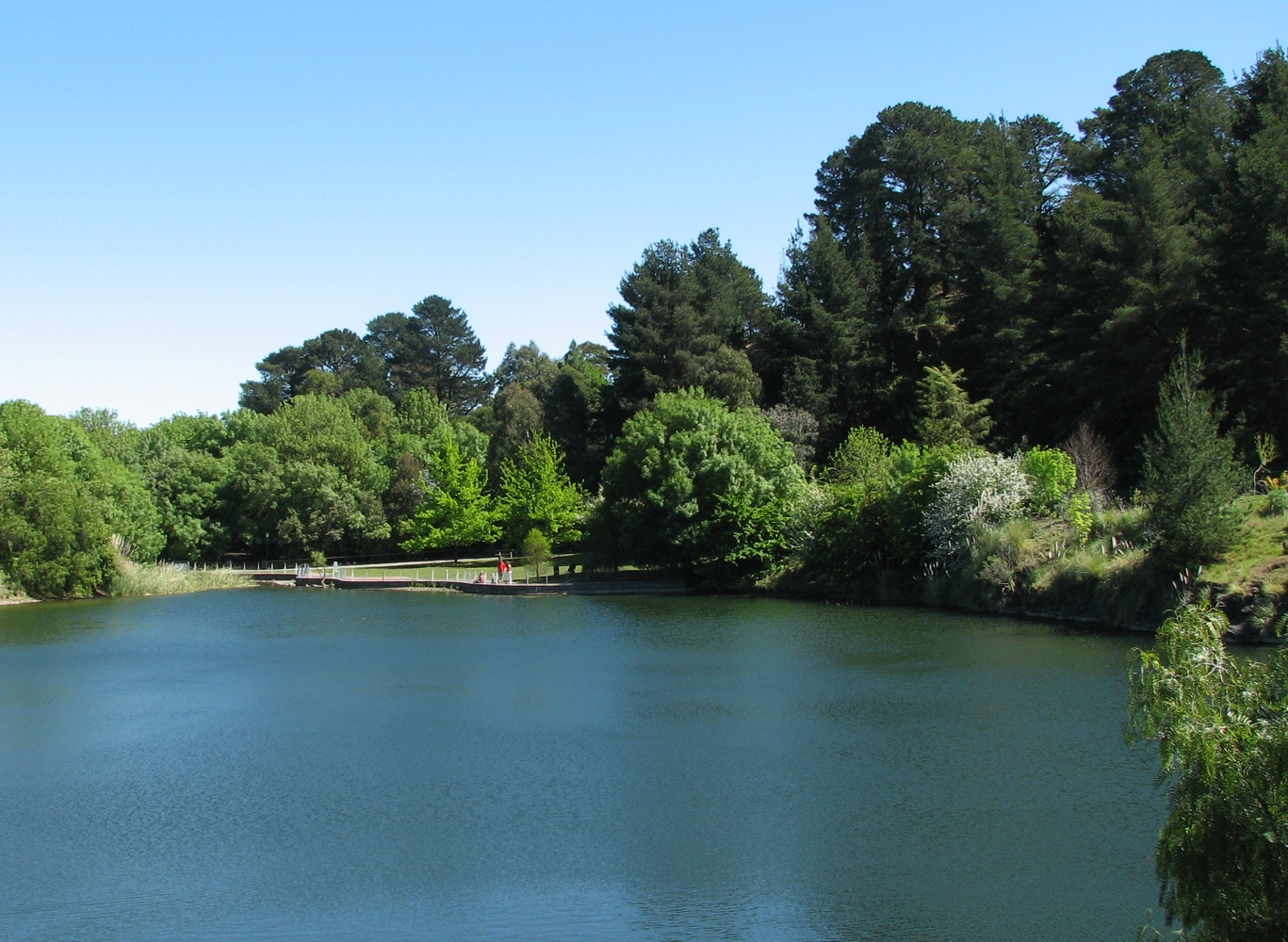
Anniversary Lake at Wilson Botanic Park

Wilson Botanic Park is a botanic garden located on Princes Highway in Berwick in Victoria, Australia.

== History ==
The 100 acre (39 hectare) site was originally a blue metal quarry which was operated between 1859 and 1976 by the Wilson family who subsequently donated the land to the community.

During early excavations, fossilised forest remnants were uncovered. Later studies found that these fossils indicated that the site was covered with tropical forest 22 million years old and include the earliest known Eucalyptus fossils.

The City of Casey started redevelopment of the site into a botanic garden in 1988, and the site was officially opened by the Governor General four years later in 1992.

== Layout and facilities ==
The park has two lakes which were former quarries, the large "Anniversary Lake" and the smaller "Basalt Lake" which has a sheer basalt rock face on its eastern edge and a boardwalk on its western edge. There is also a smaller marsh area near the entrance.

A steep pathway leads to the Hoo Hoo Lookout Tower which has extensive views over the surrounding suburban areas. There is another vantage point at Ben's Lookout. Facilities within the park include an information centre, an amphitheatre, a playground, an education room, a bird hide, as well as barbecues, shelters and rotundas.

The Hallam Bypass Trail provides access for cyclists and pedestrians. It runs along the Princes Highway, passing right by the entrance to the gardens.

== Botanical collection ==
The park includes a diverse range of plants including exotic and native trees and shrubs and a rose garden. Approximately 10% of the plants are labelled.

- Wilson Botanic Park
- List of Australian Botanical Gardens by State
