= Kambrya College =

- Berwick, Victoria; Australia

Information
- Motto: Maximising the Potential of Each Student
- Established: 2002
- Principal: Martin McDonald
- Years: 7-12
- Enrollment: 2100
- Education system: Victorian Curriculum (formerly VELS), VET and VCE
- Website: www.kambryacollege.vic.edu.au

Kambrya College is a state government funded coeducational secondary school located in Berwick, Victoria, Australia. Opening in 2002 with 97 Year 7 students, the school quickly grew to over 1600 students by 2007. The school has facilities for visual and performing arts, information technology, science, hospitality, wood and metal workshops, dedicated automotive workshop as well as a fitness centre. The school also had over 25 portable classrooms, largely due to its rapid growth in its early years, however since 2014 at least 10 of the older portables have been relinquished. In 2018 a building project will see a new block of general purpose classrooms constructed.

The school is organised into four Sub Schools, each with its own colour, mascot and representing one of the schools values. Each Sub School has their own building and is led by one Sub School Leader (Leading Teacher) and one Assistant Sub School Leaders. Students enter one of these Sub Schools in Year 7, and remain until they finish Year 9.

Sub school name	School value	Mascot	Colour	Building
Bulen Bulen	Integrity	Lyrebird	Blue	B
Gwonawa	Achievement	Black Swan	Yellow	G
Mirrim	Respect	Kangaroo	Red	M
Warin	Compassion	Wombat	Green	W

Years 10, 11 and 12 students have their own Sub School and building, with the School Captains coming from this group of students. Students in these year levels study VCE, with many students also adding a VET course to their study. Year 12 results have steadily improved over the past 6 years, with the median VCE study score in 2014 being 30. In 2020, the median VCE score was 31, with 6.4% achieving scores of above 40.

The school was accredited with the Council of International Schools, since 2008. However early in 2017 it was decided to abandon this relationship.

Kambrya College has sister schools in China, Japan and Germany, and has relations with schools in Timor and South Africa. Students and staff visit these schools on either annual or bi-annual visits.

Late in 2015, the college became accredited with the Academy of Accredited SEAL Schools, and is now allowed to offer an accelerated program to gifted students.

In 2015, the school was the subject of the ABC's 4-part series Revolution School which aired throughout 2016

== Employment issues ==
On 16 November 2005, the teachers took part in a strike and rally against controversial changes to national workplace laws. In October 2007, the school reported problems with teacher poaching from other schools due to the teacher shortage. 11 teachers were employed by private schools and another two by interstate schools in the past two years. Most were maths, science or language teachers, all recognised areas of national shortage and positions the principal had struggled to fill.

During 2012 and 2013, many teachers and support staff participated in work bans and strikes organised by the Australian Education Union as part of an ongoing dispute between the union and the state Department of Education and Early Childhood Development (DEECD) over wages and working conditions.
