= Federation University Australia, Berwick campus =

Coordinates: 38°02′24″S 145°20′24″E

Federation University Australia, Berwick Campus is a campus of Federation University Australia located in Berwick, which is a suburb of Melbourne, Australia, in the state of Victoria.

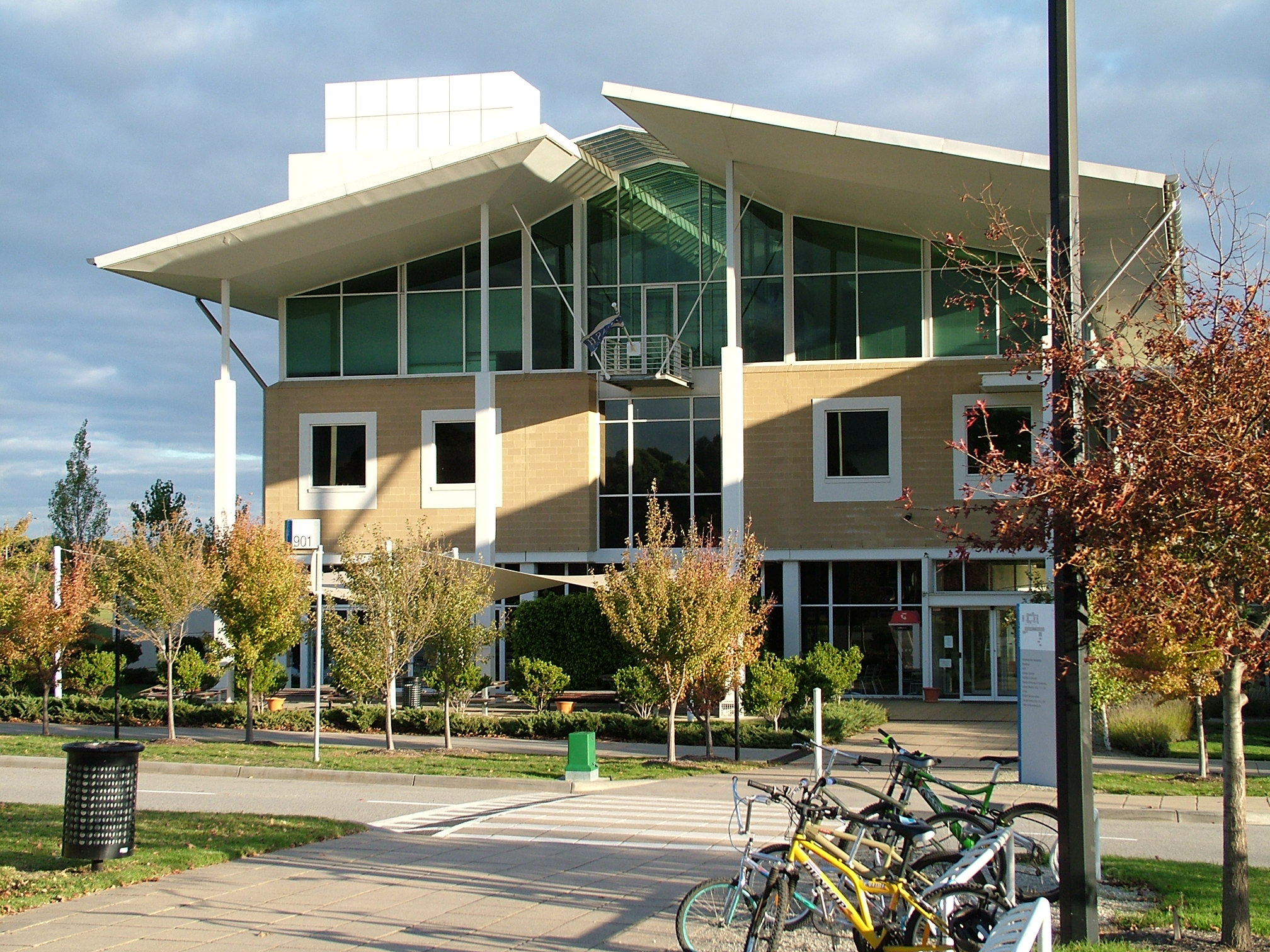
The main entrance at Federation University Berwick Campus

It is situated in the City of Casey, one of Australia's fastest-growing areas, with approximately 2000 students attending the campus. The campus covers an area of 55 ha (140 acres). A student accommodation building was completed in 2006 to stabilise the demand generated by both local and international students.

The campus opened in 1996 as a campus of Monash University. In 2018, it became a campus of Federation University.

== History ==
On 29 April 1996 the campus was opened as the Berwick campus of Monash University.

On 7 March 2016 Monash announced that it would be closing the Berwick campus by 2018. On 15 July 2016 it was announced that Federation University Australia would take responsibility for the Berwick Campus from 2017 pending government approvals. This officially commenced on 1 January 2018.

== Facilities ==
- Cafeteria (Dhanga)
- Library
- Student Accommodation
  - Halls of Residence
  - North Flats
  - Residential Pavilion
- Student lounge
  - Oscar's (Campus Bar)
- Sporting and Fitness facilities
  - Tennis court
  - Basketball court
  - Cricket nets
  - Soccer pitch

The campus is also home to various organisations as well as an onsite medical centre (Berwick Healthcare), as well as the Nossal High School, which occupy various other parts of the site.

== Transport ==
The campus is situated next to the Clyde Road exit ramp on the Princes Freeway. It takes approximately 45 minutes to travel to the campus from the Melbourne CBD. Permit parking is offered to students and staff as well as coin-operated daily ticket parking for infrequent drivers.

The Berwick train station is a seven-minute walk to the campus. Situated on the Pakenham line, trains run approximately every 20 minutes to and from the Melbourne CBD.
