= Richard Casey, Baron Casey =

Australian statesman (1890–1976)

The Right Honourable The Lord Casey KG GCMG CH DSO MC PC
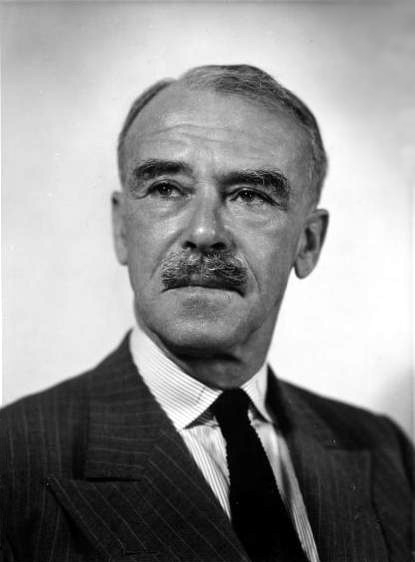
- Casey in 1954

16th Governor-General of Australia
- In office 7 May 1965 – 30 April 1969
- Monarch: Elizabeth II
- Prime Minister: Sir Robert Menzies (1965–66); Harold Holt (1966–67); John McEwen (1967–68); John Gorton (1968–69)
- Preceded by: The Viscount De L'Isle
- Succeeded by: Sir Paul Hasluck

Minister for External Affairs
- In office 11 May 1951 – 4 February 1960
- Prime Minister: Robert Menzies
- Preceded by: Percy Spender
- Succeeded by: Robert Menzies

Minister for External Territories
- In office 26 April 1951 – 11 May 1951
- Prime Minister: Robert Menzies
- Preceded by: Percy Spender
- Succeeded by: Paul Hasluck

Minister in charge of the CSIRO
- In office 23 March 1950 – 4 February 1960
- Prime Minister: Robert Menzies
- Preceded by: Office established
- Succeeded by: Donald Alastair Cameron

Minister for Works and Housing
- In office 19 December 1949 – 17 March 1950
- Prime Minister: Robert Menzies
- Preceded by: Nelson Lemmon
- Succeeded by: Wilfrid Kent Hughes

Governor of Bengal
- In office 14 January 1944 – 19 February 1946
- Preceded by: John Herbert
- Succeeded by: Frederick Burrows

Minister to the United States of America
- In office 1 February 1940 – 20 April 1942
- Prime Minister: Robert Menzies (1940–41); Arthur Fadden (1941); John Curtin (1941–42)
- Preceded by: Office established
- Succeeded by: Sir Owen Dixon

Treasurer of Australia
- In office 3 October 1935 – 26 April 1939
- Prime Minister: Joseph Lyons (1935–39); Sir Earle Page (1939)
- Preceded by: Joseph Lyons
- Succeeded by: Robert Menzies

Member of the House of Lords Lord Temporal
- In office 16 May 1960 – 17 June 1976

Member of the Australian Parliament for La Trobe
- In office 10 December 1949 – 10 February 1960
- Preceded by: Division created
- Succeeded by: John Jess

Member of the Australian Parliament for Corio
- In office 19 December 1931 – 30 January 1940
- Preceded by: Arthur Lewis
- Succeeded by: John Dedman

Personal details
- Born: Richard Gavin Gardiner Casey; 29 August 1890 Brisbane, Queensland, Australia
- Died: 17 June 1976 (aged 85) Fitzroy, Victoria, Australia
- Party: United Australia (before 1945); Liberal (after 1945)
- Spouse: Maie Ryan (m. 1926)
- Education: University of Melbourne; Trinity College, Cambridge
- Profession: Diplomat, politician

Military service
- Allegiance: Australia
- Branch/service: Australian Imperial Force
- Years of service: 1914–1919
- Rank: Major
- Battles/wars: First World War
- Awards: Distinguished Service Order; Military Cross; Mentioned in Despatches (2)

Richard Gavin Gardiner Casey, Baron Casey (29 August 1890 – 17 June 1976), was an Australian statesman who served as the 16th governor-general of Australia, in office from 1965 to 1969. He was also a distinguished army officer, long-serving cabinet minister, Ambassador to the United States, member of Churchill's War Cabinet, and Governor of Bengal.

Casey was born in Brisbane, but moved to Melbourne when he was young. He entered residence at Trinity College, Melbourne, in 1909 while studying engineering at the University of Melbourne before continuing his studies at Trinity College, Cambridge. In 1914, Casey enlisted as a lieutenant in the Australian Imperial Force. He saw service in the Gallipoli Campaign and on the Western Front, reaching the rank of major and winning the Distinguished Service Order and the Military Cross before becoming a Chief Intelligence Officer in 1920. Casey joined the Australian public service in 1924 to work at Whitehall as a liaison officer with the British administration. He reported directly to the prime minister, Stanley Bruce, with whom he developed a close relationship.

In 1931, Casey was elected to federal parliament for the United Australia Party. He served as treasurer from 1935 to 1939 (under Joseph Lyons and Earle Page), and then as Minister for Supply and Development from 1939 to 1940 (under Robert Menzies). During the Second World War, Casey was Ambassador to the United States from 1940 to 1942, and then joined Winston Churchill's War Cabinet as its representative in the Middle East. In 1944, Churchill appointed him Governor of Bengal, where he handled the recovery from the 1943 famine and civil unrest in the lead-up to independence.

Casey returned to Australia in 1946. He was federal president of the fledgling Liberal Party from 1947 to 1950, and re-entered parliament at the 1949 election. Casey was reappointed to cabinet shortly after, again serving under Menzies. He held various national development portfolios from 1949 to 1951, and then served as Minister for External Affairs until his retirement from politics in 1960. In 1965, Menzies named Casey to replace Lord De L'Isle as governor-general. He served for just under four years; the only major constitutional issue during his tenure was the disappearance of Harold Holt in 1967.

The City of Casey within Greater Melbourne is named in recognition of Casey.

== Early life and education ==
Casey was born in Brisbane, Queensland, as Richard Gavin Gardiner Casey, but he dropped the "Gavin" in later life. His father, also named Richard Gardiner Casey, of Irish descent, was a wealthy pastoralist and Member of the Queensland Legislative Assembly. His mother, Evelyn, was the daughter of George Harris, another wealthy pastoralist and Member of the Queensland Legislative Council. His father moved the family to Melbourne in 1893 and became a rich company director.

Casey was educated at Cumloden School, St Kilda, and at Melbourne Grammar School. He enrolled for engineering at the University of Melbourne, where he was a resident student at Trinity College in 1909 and 1910, but then travelled to England, entering Trinity College, Cambridge. At Cambridge, he graduated as a Bachelor of Arts in 1913, graduating with second-class honours in the mechanical sciences tripos. By the custom of Cambridge, this was translated to a Master of Arts in 1918.

== Military and early career ==
At the outbreak of the First World War in 1914, Casey joined the Australian Imperial Force, receiving a commission as a lieutenant in the 3rd Infantry Brigade on 14 September. He was a member of the first convoy on board the Orvieto, and was the responsible officer looking after the German prisoners from the SMS Emden following the Battle of Cocos until the ship reached Colombo. He was appointed an aide-de-camp on 27 February 1915, and was appointed a staff captain on the brigade staff on 20 August, receiving the corresponding promotion to captain from the same date. He served at Gallipoli as aide-de-camp to Major General Sir William Bridges. Casey was standing next to Bridges when Bridges was shot by a sniper (Bridges died three days later). Casey related a story in 1967 in a speech delivered at Gallipoli of a British officer being rescued by a Turkish soldier. A statue was created based on this story that now has pride of place in the Gallipoli battlefields. Later he served in France, where he observed operations and sifted information, earning the Military Cross and promotion to brigade major of the 8th Brigade. This position involved dangerous visits to the front line and he received a Distinguished Service Order in 1918. He resigned his commission in June 1919 and transferred to the Reserve of Officers, serving as a part-time intelligence officer in Melbourne.

Casey's father died in 1919 and he returned after the war to Melbourne to take over his father's business interests including engineering and mining firms. He did this until 1924, when the prime minister, Stanley Bruce, appointed him as his political liaison officer in London, a position he held until 1931, sending home confidential reports on political and economic matters, both for Bruce and for his Labor successor, James Scullin.

== Pre-war political career ==
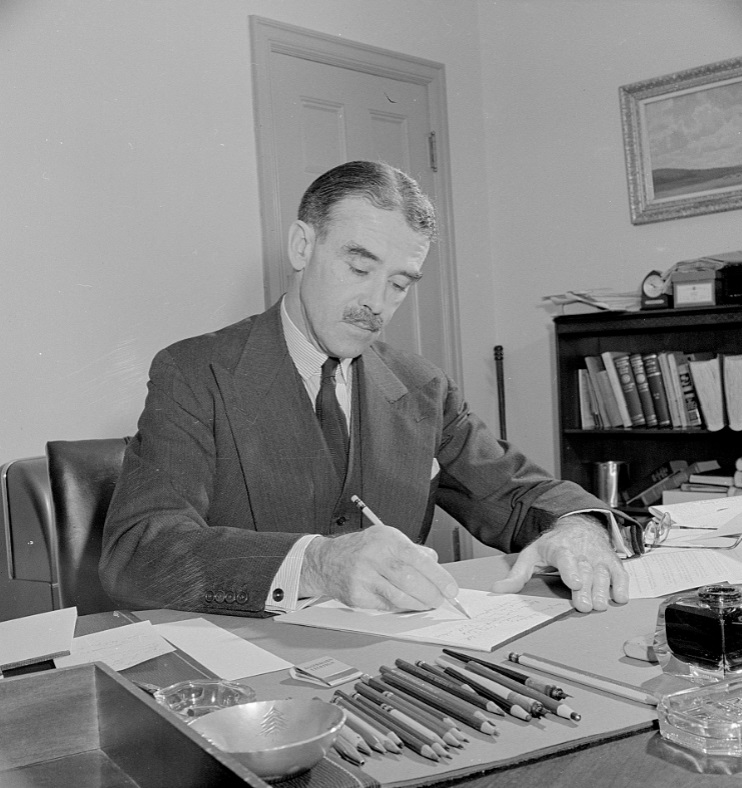
Casey in his office as Australian Minister to the United States.

In 1931, Casey returned to Australia and was elected to the House of Representatives as the United Australia Party (UAP) Member for the Geelong-based seat of Corio. The prime minister, Joseph Lyons, appointed him an assistant minister in 1933 and in 1935 he became treasurer.

In 1939, Robert Menzies became prime minister for the first time. He saw Casey as a rival and moved him to the lesser portfolio of supply and development. In 1940, Casey resigned from parliament when Menzies appointed him as the first Australian Ambassador to the United States. This was a vital posting in wartime, but it also served to remove Casey from domestic politics. Casey was in Washington, D.C., when the US entered the war and he played an important role in establishing the alliance between the US and Australia. In this effort he engaged the services of public relations counsellor Earl Newsom.

== Second World War ==
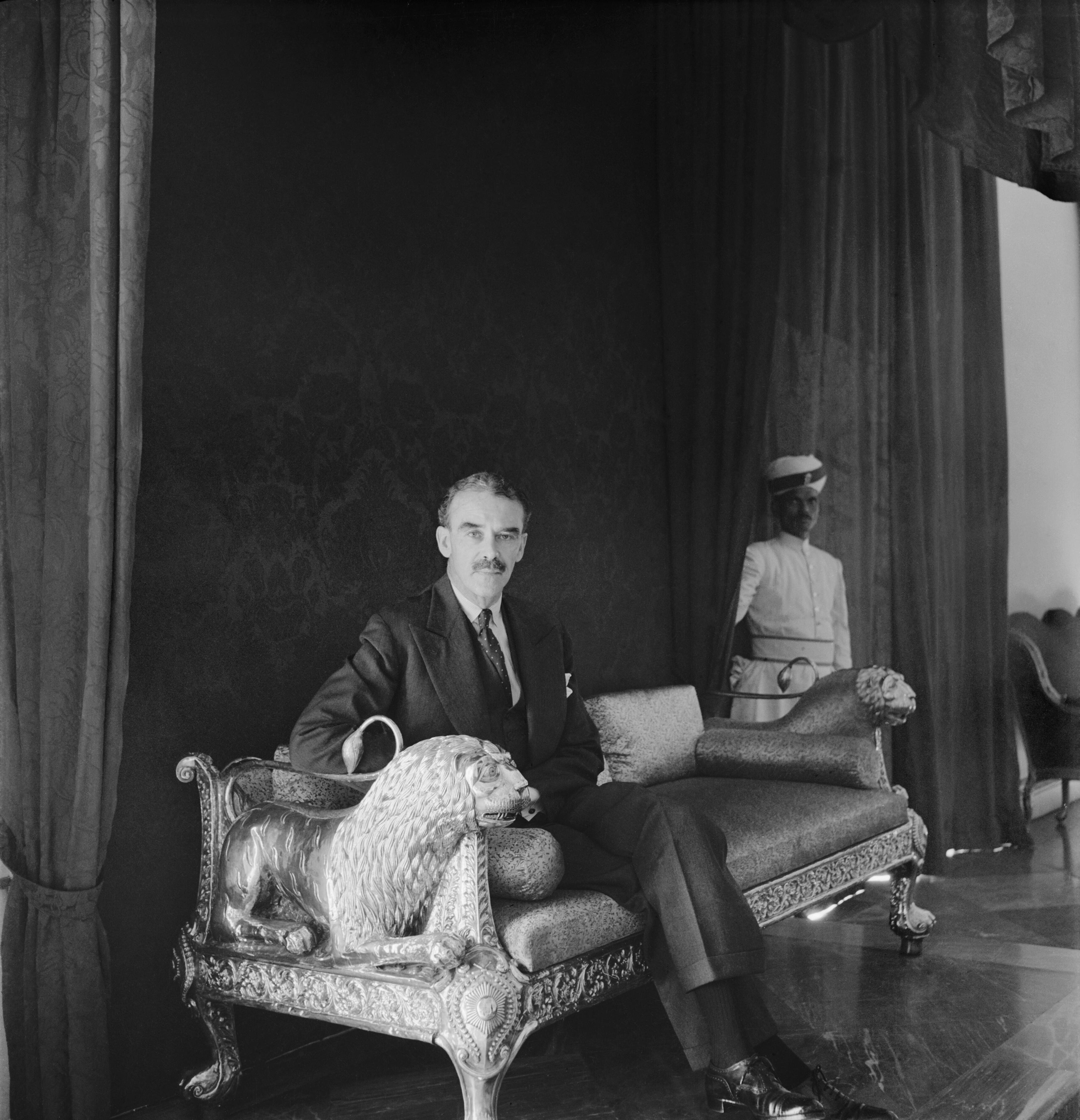
Baron Casey at Government House, Calcutta, during his tenure as the Governor of Bengal Province, British India

Casey moved to Cairo in 1942 when Winston Churchill appointed him Minister-Resident for the Middle East, to the annoyance of Prime Minister John Curtin and some in the British Foreign Office. In this role he played a key role in negotiating between the British and Allied governments, local leaders and the Allied commanders in the field. In 1944, when the Middle East ceased to be a military theatre, the British government appointed Casey as the Governor of Bengal, in India, a post which he held till 1946. During his tenure he had to deal with the aftermath of the devastating Bengal famine of 1943. He also had to deal with the ever more vocal demands for independence from Britain by Indian patriots, represented politically by the Indian National Congress.

== Post-war political career ==
In 1946 Casey returned to Australia in the hope of being elected to parliament in the 1946 election and becoming the leader of the new Liberal Party that Menzies had formed in 1944, as part of his reorganisation of conservative politics in Australia. Casey had turned down the offer of a British peerage to preserve his political chances. However, he was too late to organise his pre-selection for a seat. He was persuaded to become Federal President of the Liberal Party in September 1947 and proved to be a very effective fundraiser, partly as a result of his past social and business connections. Although Menzies still saw Casey as a rival, and although Casey undoubtedly saw himself as a future prime minister, they formed an effective partnership.

The Liberals won the 1949 election, and Casey returned to the House of Representatives as Member for the outer Melbourne seat of La Trobe. Menzies appointed him Minister for Supply and Development and Minister for Works and Housing. In March 1950 he became Minister for National Development, gaining functions from Eric Harrison's abolished portfolio of Postwar Reconstruction and losing supply to Howard Beale. In 1951, when the Minister for External Affairs, Percy Spender (another Menzies rival), was dispatched to the Washington embassy, Casey succeeded him. Casey held the External Affairs post during the height of the Cold War, the Suez Crisis, the Vietnam War and other major world events. He formed close relations with Anthony Eden, John Foster Dulles and other leaders. Casey was also Minister in charge of the Commonwealth Scientific and Industrial Research Organisation (CSIRO) from March 1950, and he was committed to its success.

On 16 May 1960 Casey was created a life peer of the British House of Lords, on the recommendation of the British prime minister, Harold Macmillan, taking the title Baron Casey, of Berwick in the State of Victoria and Commonwealth of Australia and of the City of Westminster, having resigned from the ministry and parliament in February. For most Australians, Britain was still the mother country, but it was by then becoming something of an anomaly that an Australian should be appointed to another country's parliament. Lord Casey made annual trips to London and put in appearances in the House of Lords, but he had no obvious constituency. He was also appointed to the executive of the CSIRO in 1960.

== Governor-general ==
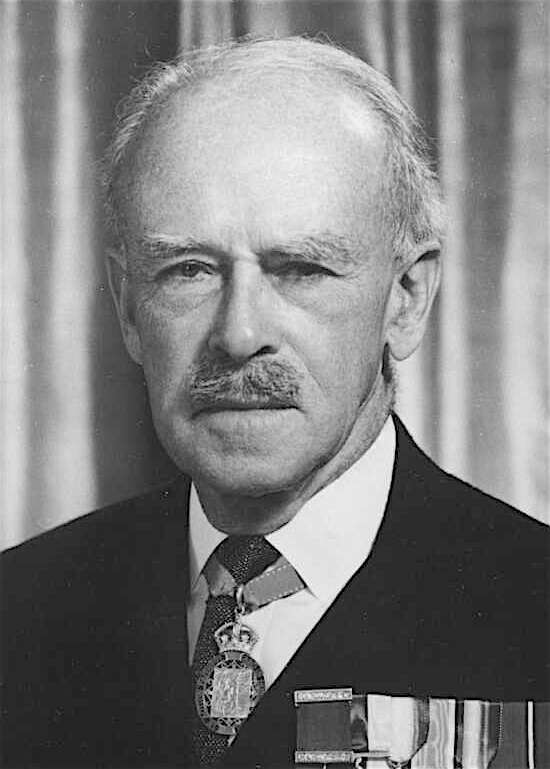
Casey as Governor-General in 1965

In 1965 the Queen, on Menzies' recommendation, appointed Lord Casey Governor-General to succeed Lord De L'Isle. This was the first time a non-Labor prime minister had recommended an Australian for the post, but it also marked the end of the appointment of non-Australians to the office of Governor-General. He was initially reluctant to accept the post, but when he did accept, he asked for a two-year appointment instead of the usual five years, subject to extension should he wish to continue. In the event, he served for three and a half years.

According to William McMahon, Prime Minister Harold Holt (Menzies' successor) considered having Casey dismissed from the governor-generalship, and went as far as to have the necessary documents drawn up. This was because Casey had twice called McMahon into Yarralumla to give him a "dressing down" over his poor relationship with Deputy Prime Minister John McEwen, which he believed was affecting the government. Holt agreed with McMahon that this was an improper intervention in the political process, but no further action was taken.

In April 1967, during the Wave Hill walk-off, the Gurindji strikers drafted a petition to Casey, asking for a lease of 1,300 km^{2} (500 sq mi) around Daguragu, to be run cooperatively by the Gurundji as a mining and cattle lease. The petition said "We feel that morally the land is ours and should be returned to us". However, in June 1967 Casey refused the lease.

One of the arguments against appointing an Australian, particularly a former politician, had always been that they would be too closely involved with Australian personalities and issues to perform their constitutional role impartially. This became an acute issue for Casey in December 1967, when Holt disappeared, presumed drowned.

Casey could have commissioned McMahon, the Deputy Leader of the Liberal Party, as acting prime minister or Caretaker prime minister, but instead he appointed John McEwen, the leader of Liberals' coalition partner, the Country Party. In this he was following a precedent set in 1939, when Sir Earle Page was appointed prime minister following the death of Joseph Lyons. But it was later alleged that Casey appointed McEwen to prevent McMahon having an advantage in the Liberal Party's ballot for a new leader, since he shared the view of some Liberals that McMahon would not be a suitable successor. This matter was aired in a 1969 book, The Power Struggle, by veteran political journalist Alan Reid. Casey's biographer, W.J. Hudson says (in his 1986 book Casey) that Casey was concerned to preserve the Liberal-Country Party coalition, and that he knew (because McEwen had told him) that the Country Party would not serve under McMahon (McEwen publicly confirmed his party's position on McMahon the day after his swearing-in). If this was his motive for commissioning McEwen rather than McMahon, it suggests that he did take political considerations into account in making his decision. On the other hand, if the coalition were to disband, there would have been no party that could command a majority in the parliament and it could well have become unworkable. Ultimately, McMahon withdrew from the leadership election, which was subsequently won by John Gorton.

Casey's Official Secretary throughout his term was Murray Tyrrell, who was knighted in 1968.

Casey left office in 1969 and he and his wife retired to their farm at Berwick in Victoria. Casey never fully recovered from a car accident in 1974, and died on 17 June 1976 at St Vincent's Hospital, Fitzroy, survived by his wife, daughter and son. He is buried in Mount Macedon cemetery.

== Personal life ==
In 1926 he married Maie Ryan, daughter of Sir Charles Ryan, with whom he had two children.

In 1937, Richard and Maie Casey took flying lessons and obtained their licences. A private landing strip was constructed at the stud farm "Edrington" near Berwick owned by Maie and her brother Rupert Ryan. When the landing strip was certified as an aerodrome in 1938 it was named Casey Airfield. Both Lord and Lady Casey remained keen pilots until their death and owned several aircraft over the years. In 1938, the Caseys purchased Percival Vega Gull which he named Corio Gull after his electorate; and he flew this plane between Melbourne and Canberra to attend Parliament until the aircraft was impressed by the Royal Australian Air Force at the outbreak of World War II. In 1924, they purchased a 1940 Fairchild 24 when he was Ambassador to the United States. He offered the aircraft to the Australian Government in 1942 and it entered Royal Australian Air Force service in 1943. It was returned to the Caseys in 1946 and they sold it in 1956. A 1947 Miles Messenger was purchased in 1953 and retired 1962; subsequently preserved at the Australian National Aviation Museum. In 1956, a Cessna 180, registered VH-RGC (after his initials) which was named Lady Casey in 1960, was purchased. Lady Casey continued to fly until her death in 1983, after which it was purchased by Nancy Bird Walton.

== Honours ==
Casey received a Military Cross, was appointed a Companion of the Distinguished Service Order (DSO) and was twice Mentioned in Despatches during the First World War. He was appointed a Member of the Order of the Companions of Honour (CH) in 1944. In 1960, he was created "Baron Casey, of Berwick in the State of Victoria and the Commonwealth of Australia, and of the City of Westminster", becoming the second (and last) Australian politician (after Stanley Bruce) to be elevated to the House of Lords (Sir John Forrest is sometimes mentioned in such lists, however his peerage was never formally established). He was appointed a Knight Grand Cross of the Order of St Michael and St George (GCMG) in 1965, and a Knight Companion of the Order of the Garter (KG) in 1969. In 1969, also, he was named Australian of the Year.

The municipality which includes Berwick is now called the City of Casey. There is also federal Electoral Division of Casey (in a different part of Melbourne). The Canberra suburb of Casey and Casey Station, a base in the Australian Antarctic Territory, were named in Casey's honour. The R. G. Casey Building in Canberra is the headquarters of the Australian Department of Foreign Affairs and Trade.

== Arms ==
Coat of arms of Richard Casey, Baron Casey
| Crest A sea gull wings expanded Proper. Escutcheon Per chevron Sable and Azure in chief a cogwheel and sun in splendour Or in base above four barrulets wavy a representation of the constellation of the Southern Cross Argent. Supporters Dexter an Australian worker of European stock habited in a white shirt and khaki trousers, sinister an Asian worker habited in a white coat and dhoti all Proper. Motto Vis Et Unitas (Strength And Unity) |

== Notes ==
Parliament of Australia
| Preceded by Arthur Lewis | Member for Corio; 1931–1940 | Succeeded by John Dedman |
Political offices
| Preceded by Joseph Lyons | Treasurer of Australia; 1935–1940 | Succeeded by Robert Menzies |
| New title | Minister for Supply and Development; 1939–1940 | Succeeded by Frederick Stewart |
Diplomatic posts
| New title | Australian Ambassador to the United States; 1940–1942 | Succeeded by Sir Owen Dixon |
Government offices
| Preceded by Oliver Lyttelton | Minister Resident in the Middle East; 1942–1944 | Succeeded by The Lord Moyne (Minister of State) |
| Preceded by John Arthur Herbert | Governor of Bengal; 1944–1946 | Succeeded by Sir Frederick Burrows |
Parliament of Australia
| New division | Member for La Trobe; 1949–1960 | Succeeded by John Jess |
Political offices
| Preceded by Nelson Lemmon | Minister for Works and Housing; 1949–1950 | Succeeded by Wilfrid Kent Hughes |
| Preceded by John Armstrong | Minister for Supply and Development; 1949–1950 | Succeeded by Howard Beale (supply) |
| Preceded by Eric Harrison | Minister for National Development; 1950–1951 | Succeeded by Bill Spooner |
| New title | Minister in charge of the Commonwealth; Scientific and Industrial Research Organisation; 1950–1960 | Succeeded by Donald Cameron |
| Preceded by Percy Spender | Foreign Minister of Australia; 1951–1960 | Succeeded by Robert Menzies |
| Preceded by Percy Spender | Minister for External Territories; 1951 | Succeeded by Paul Hasluck |
Government offices
| Preceded by The Viscount De L'Isle | Governor-General of Australia; 1965–1969 | Succeeded by Sir Paul Hasluck |
