= Dutch elm =

Dutch elm may refer to:

- Ulmus × hollandica, natural hybrid between Wych Elm (Ulmus glabra) and Field Elm (Ulmus minor)
  - Ulmus × hollandica 'Major', cultivar of Ulmus × hollandica, introduced to England from the Netherlands
  - Ulmus × hollandica 'Belgica', cultivar of Ulmus × hollandica, most common cultivar in the Netherlands

== See also ==
- Dutch elm disease, disease first identified in the Netherlands, which affects all elms, not just Dutch elms.
