= Maie Casey, Baroness Casey =

Australian poet, librettist, writer and aviator

The Right Honourable The Lady Casey AC FRSA
- The Caseys at Berwick, circa 1963

Spouse of the governor-general of Australia
- In office 7 May 1965 – 30 April 1969
- Monarch: Elizabeth II
- Governor General: Lord Casey
- Preceded by: Jacqueline Sidney, Lady De L'Isle
- Succeeded by: Alexandra, Lady Hasluck

Personal details
- Born: Ethel Marian Sumner Ryan; 13 March 1892 Melbourne, Australia
- Died: 20 January 1983 (aged 90) Berwick, Australia
- Spouse: Baron Casey (m. 1926–1976)
- Occupation: Pioneer aviator, poet, librettist, biographer, memoirist, artist and vice-regal wife

Ethel Marian Sumner Casey, Baroness Casey, AC, FRSA (née Ryan; 13 March 1892 – 20 January 1983), commonly known as Maie Casey, was an Australian pioneer aviator, poet, librettist, biographer, memoirist and artist. She was married to Lord Casey, who was Governor-General of Australia from 1965 to 1969.

== Early life ==
Ethel Marian Sumner Ryan was born in 1892, younger child of Victorian-born parents, Sir Charles Snodgrass Ryan, a prominent Melbourne surgeon, and his wife, Alice (née Sumner) Lady Ryan. She is also the granddaughter of Charles Ryan and Marian Cotton (John Cotton's daughter).

She became known as "Maie" at an early age. Rupert Ryan was her brother. She was related by blood or marriage to leading Victorian families; one of her father's sisters married Lord Charles Montagu Douglas Scott, son of the 5th Duke of Buccleuch.

Casey grew up on Collins Street, Melbourne. Her father had his residence and surgery on the same street. Casey was educated privately, and when she was 14 years old she left Australia to attend St George's Boarding School in Ascot, England. After some time she accompanied her brother to Cologne.

Her brother Rupert, a member of the House of Representatives (1940–52), married Lady Rosemary Hay, daughter of the 21st Earl of Erroll. Casey wanted to go to university, but was blocked by her father due to the ill health of the sister of his colleague Sir William Stawell, Florence Melian Stawell, during her time at Cambridge in the 1890s. During World War I, she served as a VAD nurse.

== Marriage to Richard Casey ==
Maie Ryan married Richard Casey on 24 June 1926, at St James's Parish Church, Westminster, London. She supported him in his public life. The couple had two children. His career saw them live successively in Canberra, Washington, Cairo, and India, where, during the last years of the Raj, she was Vicereine of Bengal. In Washington, D.C. she was an eloquent advocate of the United States joining the Allied cause.

== Associates ==
During a journey in 1939 to join her husband who was leading a legation to Washington. she re-met Pat Jarrett. Jarrett was a journalist known for her coverage of women's sport and they became firm friends. Casey employed Jarrett as her secretary and in 1941 she became her husband's press liaison officer.

In Egypt, she was a confidante of wartime leaders Winston Churchill, Field-Marshal Lord Montgomery and Harold Macmillan as well as an indefatigable war worker; in Bengal she fought to raise the status of Indian women, discussed political affairs with Jawaharlal Nehru. Pat Jarrett helped her and her husband entertain Mahatma Gandhi and Louis and Edwina Mountbatten.

Casey also associated with Noël Coward, Patrick White, Katharine Hepburn, Cecil Beaton, Sidney Nolan and Cynthia Reed Nolan. Australian prime minister Sir Robert Menzies referred to her as "Lady Macbeth".

When in London in 1942, Caroline Haslett threw a lunch for her at the Forum Club with distinguished guests including Lady Cripps and Margaret, Lady Moir. They maintained contact via airmail correspondence and gifts, gave letters of recommendation for international visitors to each other and met up during her visits to the UK. In 1943 she wrote to Haslett "I have a great belief in women, and I believe we should play an increasing part in world affairs. Not only directly; as much by persuasion and influence and by influence as through direct action ... You particularly can and I am sure will influence the women you come into contact with towards active participation in the future, not only in practical deeds but in thought and interest."

== Literary works ==
Casey published three autobiographical works. An Australian Story, 1837–1907, published in 1962 discussed the history of four generations of her family. Tides and Eddies was published in 1966 and an account of her early married life. In 1980, Rare Encounters included the reminiscences of Lady Edwina Mountbatten, Viscount Montgomery of Alamein, Dame Nellie Melba and her mother in law, Evelyn Casey.

Casey also published in 1975 a biography on Nellie Melba entitled Melba Re-visited. She further produced two volumes of verse, Verses in 1963 and From the Night in 1976. She further co-authored Early Melbourne Architecture 1840–1888 in 1953.

Casey further wrote a libretto to Margaret Sutherland's opera The Young Kabbarli.

== Interest in the arts ==
Casey was a painter and illustrator. She attended the Westminster School of Art in London and in Australia associated with the George Bell School in Melbourne. Here she met and became a lifelong friend of fabric designer and artist Frances Mary Burke In 1944, Casey commissioned Burke to create a fashion textile design. It was called "Bengal Tiger" and Casey was photographed by Cecil Beaton wearing the ensemble.

She illustrated Ellis Rowan's 1961's Wild flower Hunter and her own book, An Australian Story.

She was made a Fellow of the Royal Society of Arts. She was a member of the International Committee appointed to judge a work of sculpture to honour the "Unknown Political Prisoner", and she had a long association with the Museum of Modern Art in New York City.

== Aviation ==
Casey and her husband had their first flying experience when in Britain for the coronation of King George VI in 1937. On their return to Australia they took flying lessons and once they had earned their licences, bought a yellow Percival Vega Gull aeroplane, and built an airstrip at Edrington, Berwick, near Melbourne, which they had inherited and flew between their homes.

In 1950 she became the first patron of the Australian Women Pilots' Association (AWPA) at its inaugural meeting at Bankstown, New South Wales on 16 September 1950 and in October 1953 flew her Miles Messenger plane in Australia's first all-woman air race. In 1954 Casey became of member of the Ninety-Nines, an American women pilots organisation founded by Amelia Earhart and continued to fly a Cessna well into retirement.

== Further patronage ==
In January 1960, Richard Casey was made a life peer of the United Kingdom House of Lords, and she became Baroness Casey. After his retirement as Governor-General of Australia (1965–69), they purchased a house built by Eugene von Guerard in East Melbourne, and her last years were spent at Edrington, in Berwick. Lady Casey was appointed a Companion of the Order of Australia (AC) in 1982 and died in January 1983, aged 90.

== See also ==
- Spouse of the Governor-General of Australia
