= Berwick, Victoria =

Berwick
- Suburb
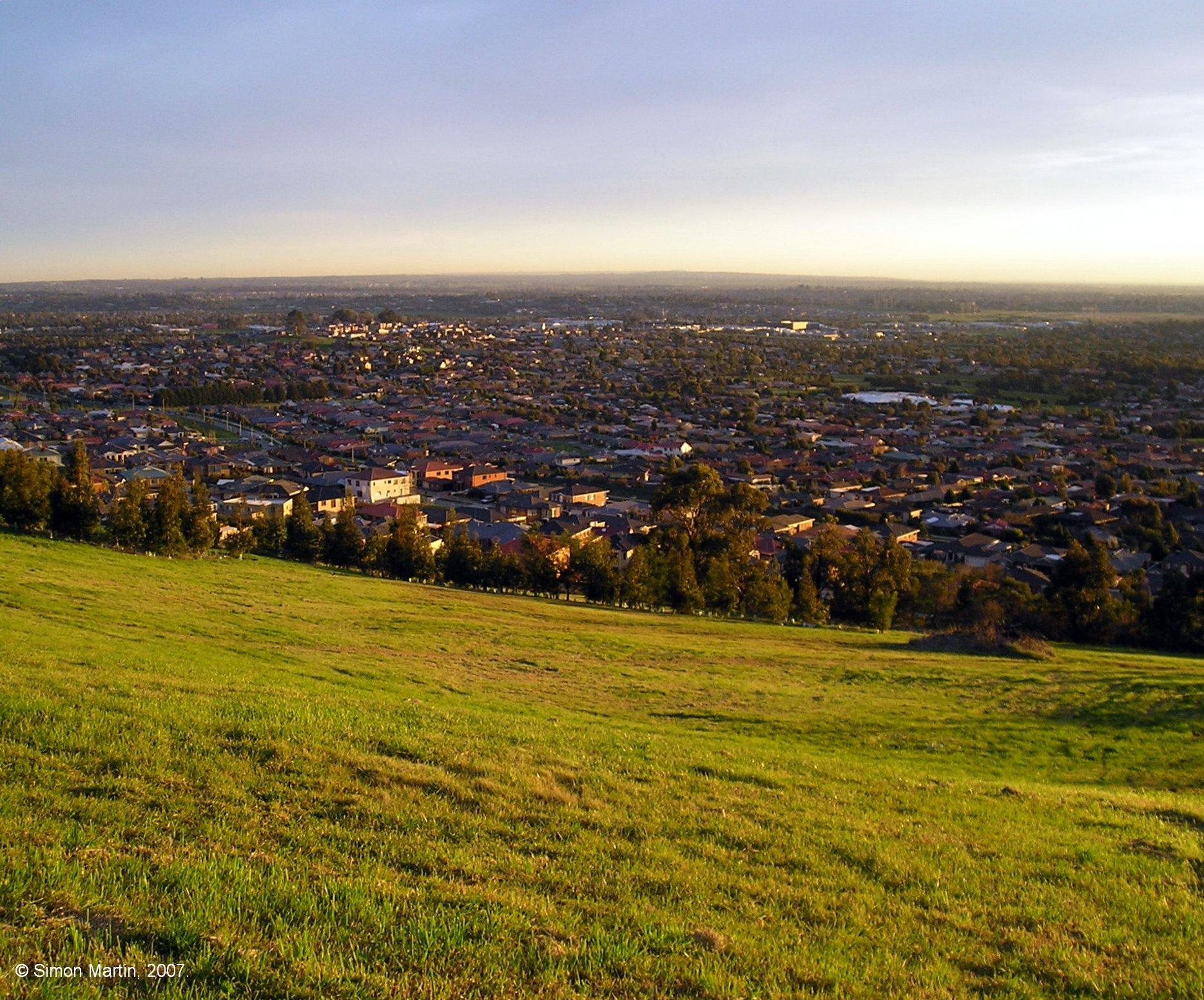
- Berwick

- Interactive map of Berwick
- Coordinates: 38.031°S 145.344°E
- Country: Australia
- State: Victoria
- City: Melbourne
- LGA: City of Casey
- Location: 40 km (25 mi) from Melbourne

Government
  - State electorates: Berwick; Narre Warren North
  - Federal divisions: Bruce; La Trobe

Area
  - Total: 23.6 km^{2} (9.1 sq mi)
- Elevation: 58 m (190 ft)

Population
  - Total: 50,298 (2021 census)
  - Density: 2,131/km^{2} (5,520/sq mi)
- Postcode: 3806
Suburbs around Berwick
Narre Warren North	Harkaway	Upper Beaconsfield
Narre Warren	Berwick	Beaconsfield
Narre Warren South	Clyde North	Officer

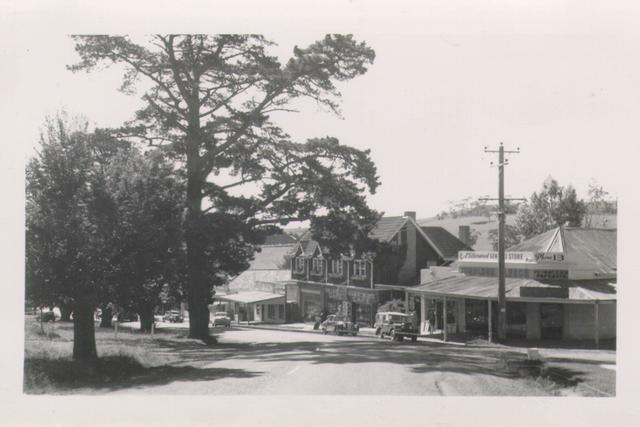
A picture of Berwick main street and general store taken in 1957

Berwick (/ˈbɛrɪk/) is a suburb in Melbourne, Victoria, Australia, 40 kilometres (25 mi) south-east of Melbourne's central business district, located within the City of Casey local government area. Berwick recorded a population of 50,298 at the 2021 census.

It was named by an early leaseholder, Robert Gardiner, after his birthplace, Berwick-on-Tweed, which is close to the Scottish English border in Northumberland.

== History ==
The town of Berwick was originally part of the Cardinia Creek run. Subdivision started in 1854 and a store, post office, hotel and other businesses were established. Wheat, barley and potatoes were grown, with a flour mill operating for several years. Dairy farming and cheese making later became the main activities. The Berwick Agricultural Society, originally started in 1848 as the Mornington Farmers' Society, is one of the oldest farmers' societies in Victoria.

The area grew with the construction of a coach road between Melbourne and the Gippsland region, and the Post Office opening on 18 September 1858.

A quarry opened in 1859 to supply ballast for the railway line along the same route, which opened in 1877, and a spur line was constructed to Berwick railway station to transport the metal. The site of the quarry is now occupied by Wilson Botanic Park. From 1861 until 1902, Berwick was also the headquarters of the Shire of Berwick, originally formed as the Berwick Roads Board.

The Berwick Mechanics' Institute and Free Library was built in 1862 at the corner of Peel and Edward Streets. In return for a nominal rent, Robert Bain agreed, in 1878, to lease a block of his land to the library for 500 years, so long as a library remained on the property for that period. In 1880, it was moved to its present site in the main street and extended the following year.

Poplar trees lining High Street into Beaconsfield were planted as an Avenue of Honour to commemorate soldiers who died in the First World War. Originally, name plaques were supposed to have been mounted at the foot of each tree, but this was never carried out despite the plaques being produced.

The 1959 post-apocalyptic film On the Beach was partially filmed in Berwick. Several streets were named after actors and cast involved in the film.

Late in the 20th century, Melbourne sprawled eastward towards Berwick. The surrounding rural land was subdivided, becoming a popular destination for first-home buyers with the population exploding and new housing developments from the 1990s to the 2000s.

=== Heritage listing ===
The following place in Berwick is listed on the Victorian Heritage Register:

- Edrington, 6 Melville Park Drive (also described as located at 132 High Street), now part of the Edrington Park retirement village

== Demographics ==
In the 2021 census, there were 50,298 people in Berwick. Of this, 62.3% were born in Australia. The next most common countries of birth were India 6.1%, Sri Lanka 3.9%, England 3.7%, China 2.9% and New Zealand 1.7%. People who only spoke English at home represented 67.5% of the population. Other languages spoken at home included Mandarin 4.0%, Sinhalese 3.8%, Hindi 1.5%, Punjabi 1.5% and Tamil 1.4%. The most common responses for religion were No Religion 35.7%, Catholic 21.9% and Anglican 7.2%.

Berwick's census populations have been 60 (1861), 636 (1891), 887 (1954), 25,461 (2001), 36,420 (2006), 44,779 (2011), 47,674 (2016) and 50,298 (2021).

== Education ==
The town's first school, Berwick Primary, was originally established in an old shepherd's hut near the old Berwick hospital in 1857. It was the first school in the south eastern area and school number 40 in Victoria. School buildings were later built on a parcel of land abutting Lyall Rd, between Peel Street and Brisbane Street. The school operated from this site until 2003 when a new school was built in Fairholme Boulevard. Subsequently, the Peel Street site was redeveloped as Pioneer Park, a community open space. The original school buildings were retained during the redevelopment and now operate as a restaurant. Berwick Primary is the only school in Berwick that is using the International Baccalaureate Curriculum.

As well as the State School, a Boys' Grammar School operated from 1882 to 1922. St Margaret's Girls' School (originally called Berwick Presbyterian Girls' School) opened in 1920 with Junior boys being admitted during the 1960s. Its boarding school ceased operating in 1978. Berwick Secondary College and Kambrya College, both public high schools, and the Berwick campuses of Beaconhills College and St. Francis Xavier College, are located in the suburb of Berwick, Victoria. Timbarra P-9 College is located on Parkhill Dr in the Timbarra estate of Berwick.

Victoria's first academically selective co-educational secondary school, Nossal High School, opened in 2010, and is located on the Federation University campus.

Berwick is also home to the third campus of Haileybury, Melbourne, with the campus named Edrington. In 1990, Berwick Lodge Primary School also opened in the suburb. Berwick Fields Primary School opened in 2006 and has an estimated total of 925 students in May 2019, and in around March 2012, the total exceeded 1,000 students. Brentwood Park Primary school is located on Bermersyde Drive, adjacent to Kambrya College.

Chisholm Institute provides TAFE courses and degrees for domestic and international students, with a Technical Education Centre opening in 2009. Chisholm Berwick also run the Casey Tech School, a shared learning facility that delivers programs to secondary schools in the region.

In 2017, Federation University moved into the former Monash University and is located at 100 Clyde Rd, Berwick on the former Casey Airfields. The university offers on campus accommodation and other facilities to students, such as a library and cafe. The main areas of study at the Berwick campus are nursing and allied health, IT, education, and business.

== Facilities ==
=== Medical ===
Berwick currently has two hospitals: Casey Public Hospital, which is in the process of being extended with a multi-storey public carpark under construction to its west; and St John of God Berwick Private Hospital, located opposite Casey Hospital on Kangan Drive. There is also a St John of God mental rehabilitation centre on Gloucester Avenue.

There are other clinics in the suburb making it mostly self-sufficient for all medical needs of the residents.

=== Commerce ===
In Berwick are three major local shopping precincts, Berwick Village, Eden Rise Village and Parkhill Plaza. There are also a number of speciality shops on the opposite corner to Eden Rise where you will find many other speciality stores running as far along Clyde Road from Greaves Road as far as Homestead Road. High Street, located along the Old Princes Highway, forms the core of Berwick Village, which contains many small shops and businesses. The area includes two main shopping centres: Berwick Marketplace, which opened on 8 November 1998, which contains a Woolworths supermarket and a number of specialty stores; and Berwick Southside, opened on 21 November 1994 and redeveloped during the mid-2010s, now home to a standalone supermarket.

Eden Rise Village is on the corner of Clyde and O'Shea Roads and includes supermarkets, two bottle shops, a and many other specialty shops. Parkhill Plaza is situated on the corner of Parkhill Drive and Ernst Wanke Road.

Clock Tower Mews is located on Bemersyde Drive, adjacent to Kambrya College. Alira Village is the "town centre" of the new Alira housing estate, on the corner of Homestead and Centre Roads.

== Transport ==
Berwick has a railway station and new bus terminus situated immediately to the south of the station. There is also a multi-storey car park for commuters, as much of the old car park was taken to build the new bus interchange. The old bus terminus is now car parking at the north of the station. Berwick railway station is a zone 2 station, that receives regular electrified metro services connecting the suburb to the Pakenham line's terminus – East Pakenham, and the greater metro network via Caulfield, South Yarra, Richmond, and the City Loop. There is one up (set down only) and one down (pick up only) service provided by V/Line directly connecting the suburb to the inner Gippsland terminus of Traralgon. Due to a restricted bus infrastructure, Berwick is a fairly car-dependant suburb, with 77.7% of people using a car to travel to work, compared to the Victorian average of 68.3%. The Princes Freeway, carrying traffic between Geelong, Melbourne and Gippsland, runs through Berwick with exits at O'Shea Road, Clyde Road and Princes Highway, where the eastern section of the Princes Freeway becomes the Monash Freeway. Work began in late 2020 to remove the level crossing on Clyde Road. This work was completed and Clyde Road was re-opened to the public with the new underpass on 21 February 2021. Berwick still has major road disruptions due to work from Kangan Drive through to the Monash Freeway interchange.

== Sport ==
The town has an Australian rules football team competing in the Eastern Football Netball League, the Berwick Football Club, and an association football team called the Berwick City Soccer Club.

The town also has a successful cricket club known as the Wickers, later changed to the Berwick Bears, that compete in the DDCA competition, and a tennis club that competes in the Berwick & District Tennis Association.

There is the Montuna Golf Club at Guys Hill approximately 5 km from Berwick Village.

There is also Little Athletics at Edwin Flack Reserve.

Berwick Badminton is open to the public for those who are interested in the sport.

The Berwick Leisure Centre is a space inside of the Berwick Secondary College grounds, at which there are gymnastics running, as well as a trampolining program. Often, there are other activities such as karate.

The Hallam Cobras Softball Club Inc have club rooms at Sweeney Reserve, Melzak Way, Berwick

== Media ==
Berwick is in the coverage range of all the commercial radio stations in Melbourne, yet is also locally serviced by 94.3 Star FM, whose studios are situated in Warragul.

== Notable residents ==
Berwick was the home of Edwin "Teddy" Flack, Australia's first Olympian and Olympic gold medallist. He won gold medals for the 800- and 1,500-metre (1,600 yd) sprints at the 1896 Summer Olympics. He was laid to rest in Berwick Cemetery, and is commemorated by a statue in High Street, Berwick. The Edwin Flack Reserve includes several sporting grounds, such as the Edwin Flack Oval, Edwin Flack Athletics Track and Edwin Flack Netball Courts, all named in his honour.

Richard Casey, later Baron Casey of Berwick and Governor-General of Australia, was a resident of Berwick. His home of Edrington was later converted into an aged care facility.

Scott McDonald, Australian International football (soccer) player, striker for Celtic FC in Scotland and top scorer in the Scottish Premier League in the 2007–08 season, grew up in Berwick. Former AFL games record holder Michael Tuck and former Hawthorn defender Mark Graham grew up in Berwick, as did 2009 number one draft pick Tom Scully, former Brisbane Lions ruckman Stefan Martin and former defender and coach Justin Leppitsch, who was assistant coach to Richmond from 2016 to 2020.

== See also ==
- City of Berwick – Berwick was previously within this former local government area.
