= Canterbury Road, Melbourne =

Road in Melbourne, Australia

Canterbury Road Victoria
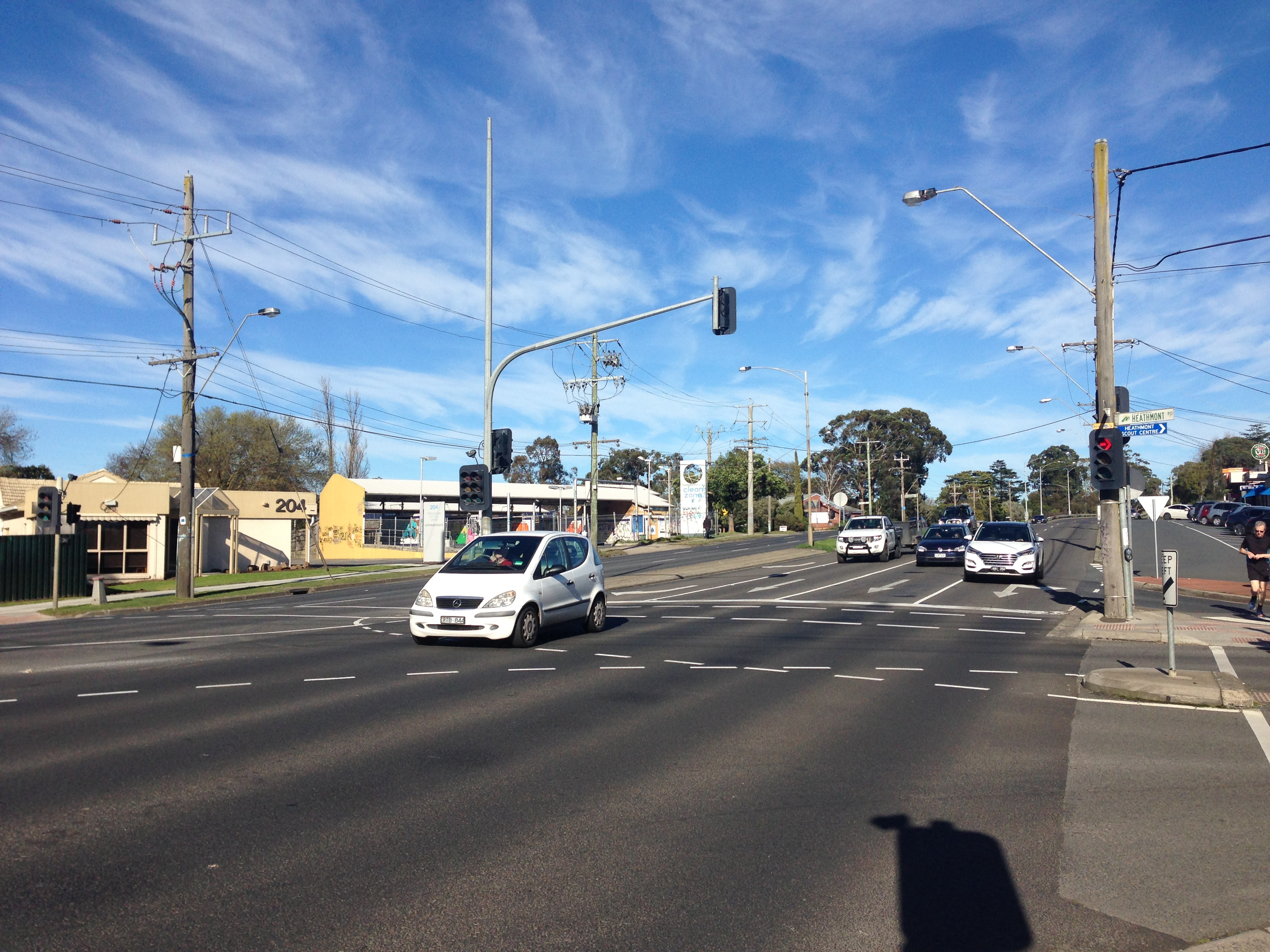
- Canterbury Road, Heathmont
- Coordinates: 37.821389°S 145.058589°E (West end); 37.812099°S 145.336883°E (East end)

General information
- Type: Road
- Length: 25.8 km (16 mi)
- Gazetted: September 1960
- Route number(s): Metro Route 32 (1965–present)

Major junctions
- West end: Rathmines Road; Camberwell, Melbourne
- Burke Road; Warrigal Road; Middleborough Road; Springvale Road; EastLink
- East end: Mount Dandenong Road; Montrose, Melbourne

Location(s)
- Major suburbs: Canterbury, Surrey Hills, Vermont, Heathmont

Canterbury Road is a major arterial road through eastern Melbourne, linking the inner eastern suburbs to the outer eastern fringe at the western foot of the Dandenong Ranges.

== Route ==
Canterbury Road starts at the intersection with Burke and Rathmines Roads in Camberwell and runs east as a dual-lane, single-carriageway road until its intersection with Stanhope Grove, where it widens to a four-lane, single-carriageway road and continues east, underneath the Lilydale and Belgrave railway lines at Canterbury, through Surrey Hills until it reaches the intersection with Middleborough Road at the south-eastern corner of Box Hill. It widens to a four-lane, dual-carriageway road and continues east until Blackburn Road in Blackburn, where it widens further to a six-lane, dual-carriageway road. It continues east through Forest Hill and Heathmont, narrowing back to a four-lane, dual-carriageway road east of Dorset Road in Bayswater North and continuing east through Kilsyth, before eventually terminating at the intersection with Mount Dandenong Road in Montrose.

== History ==
The passing of the Country Roads Act 1958 (itself an evolution from the original Highways and Vehicles Act 1924) provided for the declaration of State Highways and Main Roads, roads partially financed by the State government through the Country Roads Board (later VicRoads). Canterbury Road was declared a Main Road on 7 September 1960, between Burke Road in Camberwell and Warrigal Road in Surrey Hills. Construction of a steel and reinforced concrete rail-over-road overpass bridge replacing the level crossing with the Lilydale and Belgrave railway lines in Canterbury, was completed by Victorian Railways, with the Board lowering the road surface under it and carrying out improvements to adjacent streets, in the 1969/70 financial year.

Canterbury Road was signed as Metropolitan Route 32 between Camberwell and Montrose in 1965, originally heading further east along Swansea Road to Lilydale; with Victoria's conversion to the newer alphanumeric system in the late 1990s, the section between Montrose and Lilydale was replaced by route C401 and the route was truncated back to Montrose.

The passing of the Road Management Act 2004 granted the responsibility of overall management and development of Victoria's major arterial roads to VicRoads: in 2004, VicRoads re-declared Canterbury Road (Arterial #5802) from Burke Road in Camberwell to Mount Dandenong Road in Montrose.

=== Canterbury Road Upgrade ===
In 2016, the Australian Government committed $20 million to build a third lane outbound along Canterbury Road from Dorset Road to Montrose Road and to upgrade the Montrose roundabout to a signalised intersection. In 2018, the Australian Government committed a further $24.5 million to build a third lane inbound along Canterbury Road from Liverpool Road to Dorset Road.

== Major intersections ==
LGA	Location	km	mi	Destinations	Notes
Boroondara	Camberwell	0.0	0.0	Rathmines Road (west) – Hawthorn East	Western terminus of road
Boroondara	Camberwell	0.0	0.0	Burke Road (Metro Routes 17/32 north, Metro Route 17 south) – Heidelberg, Camberwell, Caulfield East	Metro Route 32 continues north along Burke Road
Boroondara	Canterbury	1.9	1.2	Balwyn Road – Balwyn North	
Boroondara	Surrey Hills	3.5	2.2	Union Road – Balwyn	
Boroondara–Whitehorse border	Surrey Hills	3.7	2.3	Warrigal Road (Metro Route 15) – Burwood, Oakleigh, Mentone	
Whitehorse	Surrey Hills–Box Hill–Box Hill South tripoint	4.8	3.0	Elgar Road – Doncaster, Burwood	
Whitehorse	Box Hill–Box Hill South	5.6	3.5	Station Street (Metro Route 47) – Templestowe, Doncaster, Huntingdale	
Whitehorse	Box Hill–Box Hill South–Blackburn–Blackburn South quadripoint	7.0	4.3	Middleborough Road (Metro Route 23) – Doncaster, Mount Waverley, Chelsea Heights	
Whitehorse	Blackburn–Blackburn South border	8.7	5.4	Blackburn Road (Metro Route 13) – Doncaster East, Blackburn, Clayton	
Whitehorse	Forest Hill	10.1	6.3	Springvale Road (Metro Route 40) – Donvale, Nunawading, Glen Waverley, Edithvale	
Whitehorse	Vermont	12.2	7.6	Mitcham Road (Metro Route 36 north) – Doncaster, Mitcham; Boronia Road (Metro Route 36 south) – Boronia, Sassafras	
Maroondah	Ringwood	14.2	8.8	EastLink (M3) – Clifton Hill, Doncaster, Dandenong, Frankston	
Maroondah	Ringwood	15.1	9.4	Wantirna Road (Metro Route 9) – Ringwood, Wantirna	
Maroondah	Bayswater North	19.5	12.1	Bayswater Road (Metro Route 7) – Croydon, Ferntree Gully	
Maroondah	Bayswater North	21.2	13.2	Dorset Road (Metro Route 5) – Croydon North, Boronia, Ferntree Gully	
Yarra Ranges	Montrose	25.8	16.0	Mount Dandenong Road (Metro Route 62 west, C401/C415 northeast) – Croydon, Lilydale, Mount Dandenong	Eastern terminus of road and Metro Route 32
1.000 mi = 1.609 km; 1.000 km = 0.621 mi: Route transition
