= Division of Deakin =

Australian federal electoral division

Coordinates: 37.822°S 145.206°E

Deakin Australian House of Representatives Division
- Interactive map of electorate boundaries from the 2025 federal election
- Created: 1937
- MP: Matt Gregg
- Party: Labor
- Namesake: Alfred Deakin
- Electors: 126,749 (2025)
- Area: 98 km^{2} (37.8 sq mi)
- Demographic: Outer metropolitan
Electorates around Deakin:
Menzies	Menzies	Casey
Menzies	Deakin	Casey
Chisholm	Aston	Casey

The Division of Deakin is an Australian Electoral Division in Victoria. It is located in the eastern suburbs of Melbourne, and covers the majority of City of Maroondah, and parts of City of Whitehorse and City of Manningham.

== Geography ==
Since 1984, federal electoral division boundaries in Australia have been determined at redistributions by a redistribution committee appointed by the Australian Electoral Commission. Redistributions occur for the boundaries of divisions in a particular state, and they occur every seven years, or sooner if a state's representation entitlement changes or when divisions of a state are malapportioned.

When the division was created in 1937, it replaced areas previously in the Division of Indi, and to smaller extents, the Division of Corio, Division of Flinders and the abolished Division of Echuca. It included areas north of Melbourne such as Whittlesea, Broadford and Seymour, areas in the north east of Melbourne such as the Yarra Valley, Yea, Alexandra and Mansfield, and areas east of Melbourne such as Box Hill, Ringwood and Lilydale. In 1949, the division was significantly shrunk to only include the Yarra Valley and eastern Melbourne, losing Broadford and Seymour to the new Division of Lalor and losing Yea, Alexandra and Mansfield back to the Division of Indi. The division also lost the Ringwood area in eastern Melbourne to the new Division of La Trobe. In 1955, it lost the areas around Whittlesea to the Division of Lalor.

In 1968, it lost more than 90% of its area in Yarra Valley and north-east Melbourne to the Division of La Trobe and the new divisions of Casey and Diamond Valley. This left Deakin to only consist of only areas around Blackburn and Box Hill. Since then, the division has been based only in the eastern suburbs of Melbourne. However, it also gradually shifted east, expanding towards Mitcham and Heathmont (in 1977), Ringwood (in 1989) and then Croydon (in 2010). The expansion in 1977, previously in Casey, also included some areas in the City of Knox. However, in 1984, it lost those areas to the new Division of Aston.

Between 2021 and 2024, the division covered the entire City of Maroondah. In 2024, it lost the portion of the City south of Canterbury Road and east of EastLink to the Division of Aston, which included the entire suburb of Kilsyth South.

As of the 2024 redistribution, it covers the majority of City of Maroondah, the eastern half of City of Whitehorse and a portion of City of Manningham. It includes in Croydon, Croydon North, Croydon South, East Ringwood, Forest Hill, Heatherdale, Mitcham, Nunawading, Vermont, Vermont South and Warranwood; it also covers parts of Blackburn, Blackburn North, Blackburn, Burwood East, Bayswater North, Croydon Hills, Donvale, Heathmont, Kilsyth, North Ringwood, Park Orchards, Ringwood, Park Orchards and Wonga Park.

== History ==
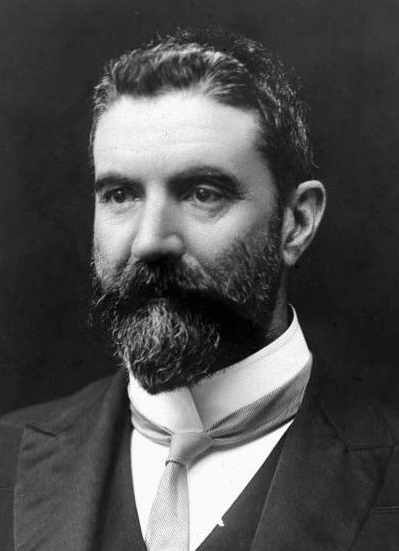
Alfred Deakin, the division's namesake

The division was created in 1937, and was named in honour of Alfred Deakin, who served as Prime Minister of Australia on three non-consecutive occasions from 1903 to 1910. Deakin had represented the Victorian federal seat of Ballarat from 1901 to 1913.

Initially a rural seat north and north-east of Melbourne, the division has been located solely in the eastern suburbs of Melbourne since 1969.

Deakin has usually been held by the Liberal Party, though it became increasingly marginal from the 1980s onward. Prior to the 2013 federal election it was the second most marginal Labor Party seat in Australia. At the 2013 federal election, Michael Sukkar reclaimed the seat for the Liberal Party and was elected with 53.2% of the two-party-preferred vote.

At the time of the 2022 Australian federal election, approximately 10% of the electorate's population possessed Chinese ancestry.

In 2025, the Labor Party of Australia challenger Matt Gregg managed to defeat incumbent Liberal Party MP Michael Sukkar by a margin of about 53 percent to 47 percent. This trend of urban, white-collar seats swinging towards Labor can also be reflected in seats such as Division of Aston or Division of Menzies.

== Members ==
Image	Member	Party	Term	Notes
	William Hutchinson (1904–1967)	United Australia	23 October 1937 – 21 February 1945	Previously held the Division of Indi. Retired
	William Hutchinson (1904–1967)	Liberal	21 February 1945 – 31 October 1949	Previously held the Division of Indi. Retired
	Frank Davis (1900–1980)	Liberal	10 December 1949 – 31 October 1966	Retired
	Alan Jarman (1923–1992)	Liberal	26 November 1966 – 5 March 1983	Lost seat
	John Saunderson (1948–)	Labor	5 March 1983 – 1 December 1984	Transferred to the Division of Aston
	Julian Beale (1934–2021)	Liberal	1 December 1984 – 24 March 1990	Transferred to the Division of Bruce
	Ken Aldred (1945–2016)	Liberal	24 March 1990 – 29 January 1996	Previously held the Division of Bruce. Lost preselection and retired
	Phil Barresi (1955–)	Liberal	2 March 1996 – 24 November 2007	Lost seat
	Mike Symon (1965–)	Labor	24 November 2007 – 7 September 2013	Lost seat
	Michael Sukkar (1981–)	Liberal	7 September 2013 – 3 May 2025	Served as minister under Morrison. Lost seat
	Matt Gregg	Labor	3 May 2025 – present	Incumbent

== Election results ==
2025 Australian federal election: Deakin
Party	Candidate	Votes	%	±%
Liberal	Michael Sukkar	44,732	38.73	−2.77
Labor	Matt Gregg	40,177	34.78	+1.87
Greens	Amy Mills	13,758	11.91	−2.29
Independent	Jess Ness	8,253	7.15	+7.15
One Nation	Anne Cooke	3,043	2.63	+0.39
Family First	Richard Griffith-Jones	2,106	1.82	+1.82
Trumpet of Patriots	Milton Wilde	1,853	1.60	+0.69
Libertarian	Will Vandermeer	1,585	1.37	−0.71
Total formal votes		115,507	96.10	+0.08
Informal votes		4,692	3.90	−0.08
Turnout		120,199	94.89	+2.43
Two-party-preferred result
Labor	Matt Gregg	61,014	52.82	+2.84
Liberal	Michael Sukkar	54,493	47.18	−2.84
Labor gain from Liberal		Swing	+2.84	

2022 Australian federal election: Deakin
Party	Candidate	Votes	%	±%
Liberal	Michael Sukkar	41,626	41.51	−6.21
Labor	Matt Gregg	32,844	32.76	+0.40
Greens	Rob Humphreys	13,904	13.87	+4.58
United Australia	Bianca Gidley	2,836	2.83	+0.76
One Nation	Natasha Coughlan	2,306	2.30	+2.30
Liberal Democrats	Harrison Carr	1,843	1.84	+1.84
Animal Justice	Katherine Dolheguy	1,650	1.65	−0.31
Independent	Qian Liu	1,271	1.27	+1.27
Justice	Judith Thompson	1,080	1.08	−2.23
Federation	Samantha Bastin	909	0.91	+0.91
Total formal votes		100,269	95.78	−0.15
Informal votes		4,419	4.22	+0.15
Turnout		104,688	93.09	−2.08
Two-party-preferred result
Liberal	Michael Sukkar	50,322	50.19	−4.50
Labor	Matt Gregg	49,947	49.81	+4.50
Liberal hold		Swing	−4.50	

Alluvial diagram for preference flows in the seat of Deakin in the 2022 federal election. indicates at what stage the winning candidate had over 50% of the votes and was declared the winner.
