= List of places on the Victorian Heritage Register in the City of Maroondah =

This is a list of places on the Victorian Heritage Register in the City of Maroondah in Victoria, Australia. The Victorian Heritage Register is maintained by the Heritage Council of Victoria.

The Victorian Heritage Register, as of 2021, lists the following three state-registered places within the City of Maroondah:

Place name	Place #	Location	Suburb or Town	Co-ordinates	Built	State registered	Photo
Maternal and Child Health Centre	H0054	12 Civic Square	Croydon	37.799040°S 145.281000°E	1930	8 September 2005	
Merklin-Schütze Pipe Organ	H2160	144-158 Colchester Road	Bayswater North	37.815250°S 145.303430°E	1870	12 June 2008	
Ringwood railway station	H1587	130-136 Maroondah Highway	Ringwood	37.815760°S 145.229210°E	1889	20 August 1982	
