= William Ellis Green =

Australian editorial cartoonist and illustrator (1923–2008)

- Born: Ian Ellis Green; 12 August 1923; Fitzroy, Victoria, Australia
- Died: 29 December 2008 (aged 85); Ringwood East, Victoria, Australia
- Occupations: Editorial cartoonist, illustrator
- Writing career
- Pen name: "WEG"
- Period: 1946–1986
- Website: wegart.com.au

William Ellis Green OAM (12 August 1923 – 29 December 2008), who signed his cartoons "WEG", was an Australian editorial cartoonist and illustrator who drew the Australian Football League premiership posters from 1954 until his death.

== Life and career ==
Green's original name was Ian; he later legally changed it to William. Born in the Melbourne suburb of Fitzroy on 12 August 1923 to an unknown father, Green grew up in Essendon. Torn between becoming an architect or a cartoonist after leaving Essendon High School, he studied architecture at the Melbourne Technical College because his mother warned: "You'll starve if you're a cartoonist."

In 1941, at the age of 18, he enlisted in the Australian Army; he was attached to the 15th Brigade Army Intelligence in New Guinea. He drew cartoons that were published in the army's newspaper. Following his discharge from the army at the end of World War II, Green resumed his architectural studies, but he abandoned architecture in favour of a postwar rehabilitation art course at the National Gallery of Victoria, where his tutors included Sir William Dargie. During this time he submitted cartoons to The Herald. When the paper's political cartoonist, Sammy Wells, went on holiday for six weeks in 1946, Green was asked to fill in for him. His work appealed to the editor-in-chief, John Williams, and in 1947 he was invited to join The Herald staff permanently. He continued to be a political cartoonist for the paper until he retired in 1986, after 40 years in that role. Green was responsible for introducing the daily "pocket" cartoon Weg's Day, a single-column topical comment, humorously presented, that appeared for the first time in 1949 and continued on the paper's front page for 38 years.

On 14 May 1949, Green married Joan Hettie Currell in Milton, Queensland.

Green continued working as a caricaturist and illustrator, with his work appearing in cricket books by Max Walker, on stamps, and in children's books.

== Premiership posters ==
In the 1954 VFL season, Green began drawing premiership posters of the winning teams of the Victorian Football League (VFL) Grand Final for the Weekend Herald. By 1966, Green's posters had become so popular that The Herald started producing and selling them after the grand final. The posters, generally featuring a caricature of the winning club's mascot smiling gleefully, continued to sell around 100,000 copies each year. Although the series started in 1954, Green produced posters for all the grand finals back to 1897 to satisfy collectors. An exhibition of all 55 of Green's original posters was staged at the National Sports Museum in 2009. The tradition continued after Green's death, with Herald Sun cartoonist Mark Knight taking over as the illustrator of the posters from 2009. The family of the late cartoonist release a grand final poster every year in his memory from artwork supplied by Green before he died. He told family that he wanted his posters to go on after he was gone. His private company, Weg Art, supplies the posters each year.

== Later life and death ==
On 14 January 2005, the 82-year-old Green confronted a burglar running through his back yard in Heathmont, Victoria. After confronting the man, Green called the police and then proceeded to take pen to paper and produce a caricature. His art was immediately recognisable to the local police. The offender was soon apprehended at a local shop as the cartoon clearly showed the man responsible.

Green died on 29 December 2008 at the Maroondah Hospital; he was survived by his wife Joan, daughter Lynette, and son Ian.

== Honours ==
In June 2001, Green received the Medal of the Order of Australia "for service to art as a cartoonist and illustrator, and to the community, particularly through the Good Friday Appeal of the Royal Children's Hospital."

In 2003, he received the Jim Russell Award from the Australian Cartoonists' Association in acknowledgement of his lifelong contribution to the profession of cartooning.

In 2009, the Melbourne Press Club posthumously bestowed on him the Quill Award for Lifetime Achievement.
