= Brushy Creek (Melbourne) =

Location
- Country: Australia
- State: Victoria
- Region: Central Victoria
- City: Melbourne

Physical characteristics
- Source: Mooroolbark
  - location: Melbourne, Victoria
  - coordinates: 37°47′55″S 145°20′30″E
- Mouth
  - location: Yarra River, Wonga Park, Victoria, Australia
  - coordinates: 37°43′04″S 145°17′08″E
- Discharge
  - location: mouth

Brushy Creek is a tributary of the Yarra River in Melbourne. The creek rises in Mooroolbark Heights and passes through a mixture of underground channels and floodways through the east of Mooroolbark, until it returns to an open waterway through central Mooroolbark. From Mooroolbark it continues downstream through Croydon and passes under the Maroondah Highway, where it flows through Croydon North, Chirnside Park and Wonga Park until it joins the Yarra River in the Warrandyte State Park.

== Tributaries ==
Tributaries of Brushy Creek include Mooroolbark, Lincoln Road, Five Ways and Warrien Road Main drains. Some of these are channeled underground.

== Transport ==
The creek features The Brushy Creek Linear Trail, a shared use cycling and pedestrian track, follows the general course of Brushy Creek from Maroondah Highway to Cambridge Road at the Pembroke Retarding Basin, mainly existing in trail form through the suburb of Mooroolbark. The trail links up to the 'spirit of Barak' trail at Maroondah Highway.

== Parklands ==
Upstream to downstream:

- Pembroke Retarding Basin (Mooroolbark)
- Zina Grove Reserve (Mooroolbark)
- Mooroolbark Heights Reserve (Mooroolbark)
- Hyde Park Walk Reserve (Mooroolbark)
- Red Earth Community Park (Mooroolbark)
- Esther Park (Mooroolbark)
- Barngeong Reserve (Croydon)
- Hughes Park (Croydon North)
- Brushy Park (Croydon North)
- Pezzimenti Reserve (Wonga Park/Chirnside Park)
- Brushy Creek Retarding Basin (Wonga Park/Chirnside Park)
- Wittons Reserve (Wonga Park)
- Warrandyte State Park (Wonga Park)
