= Rex Ritchie =

Australian rules footballer (1914–2006)

Personal information
- Full name: Reginald Francis Ritchie
- Born: 24 December 1914; Croydon, Victoria
- Died: 1 April 2006 (aged 91); Ringwood East, Victoria
- Original team: Preston (VFA)
- Height: 177 cm (5 ft 10 in)
- Weight: 75 kg (165 lb)

Playing career^{1}
Years	Club	Games (Goals)
1934	Preston (VFA)	6 (0)
1936–1942, 1946–1947	South Melbourne	89 (1)
- ^{1} Playing statistics correct to the end of 1947.

Reginald Francis "Rex" Ritchie (24 December 1914 – 1 April 2006) was an Australian rules footballer who played with South Melbourne in the VFL. Ritchie was a defender and won the South Melbourne Best and Fairest award in 1941.

Ritchie's time at South Melbourne was interrupted by his service in the Australian Army during World War II.
