= Croydon North =

Croydon North may refer to:

- Croydon North (UK Parliament constituency), in Greater London, England
- Croydon North, Victoria, a suburb of the city of Melbourne, Australia
