= Croydon South, Victoria =

Croydon South Melbourne, Victoria
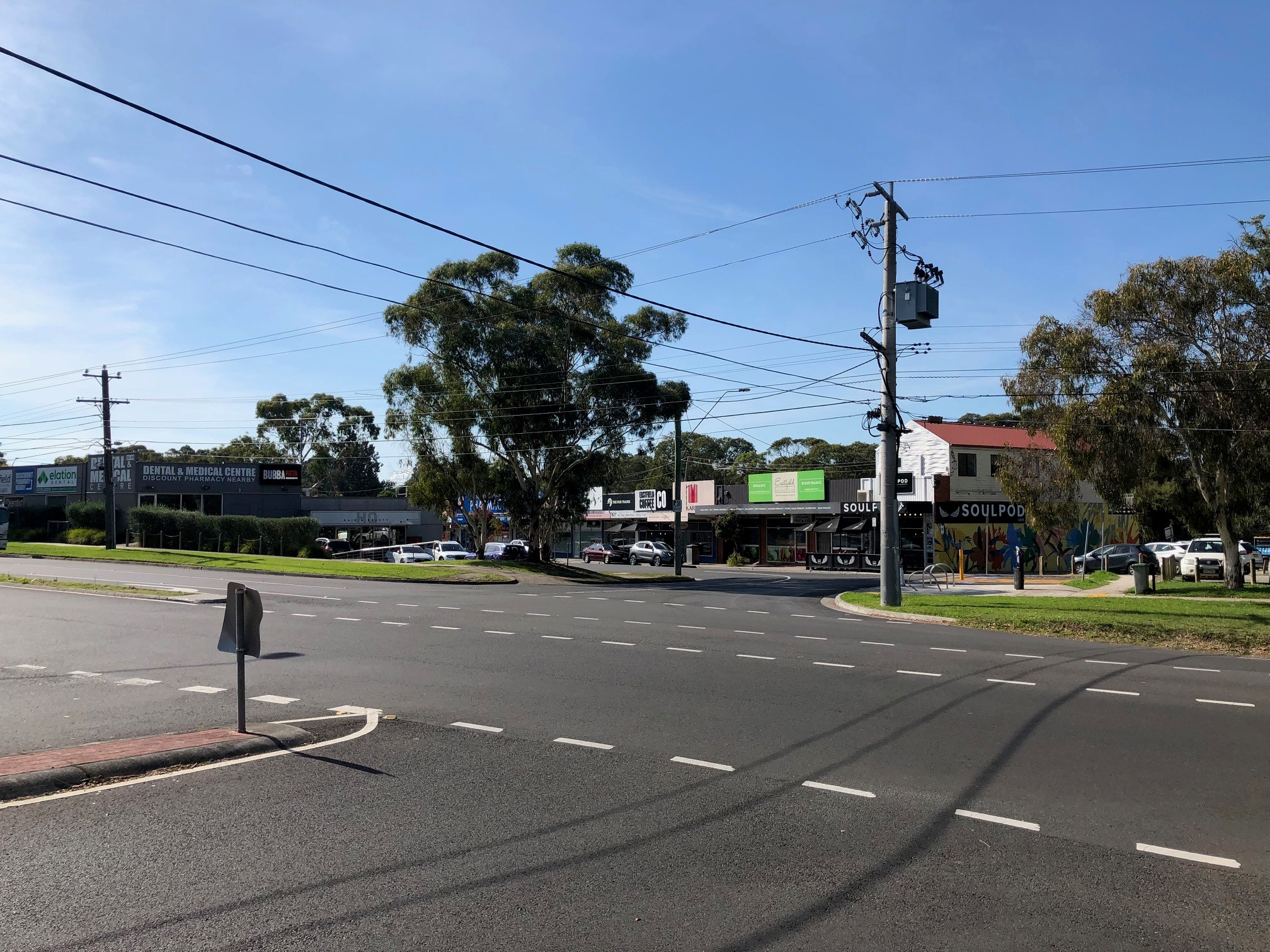
- Eastfield Shopping Centre from Bayswater Road

- Coordinates: 37.816°S 145.278°E
- Population: 4,759 (2021 census)
  - Density: 1,830/km^{2} (4,740/sq mi)
- Postcode(s): 3136
- Elevation: 130 m (427 ft)
- Area: 2.6 km^{2} (1.0 sq mi)
- Location: 29 km (18 mi) E of Melbourne CBD (Central Melbourne)
- LGA(s): City of Maroondah
- Region: Greater Melbourne
- County: Mornington
- State electorate(s): Croydon
- Federal division(s): Deakin
Suburbs around Croydon South:
Ringwood East	Croydon	Croydon
Ringwood East	Croydon South	Kilsyth
Bayswater North	Bayswater North	Bayswater North

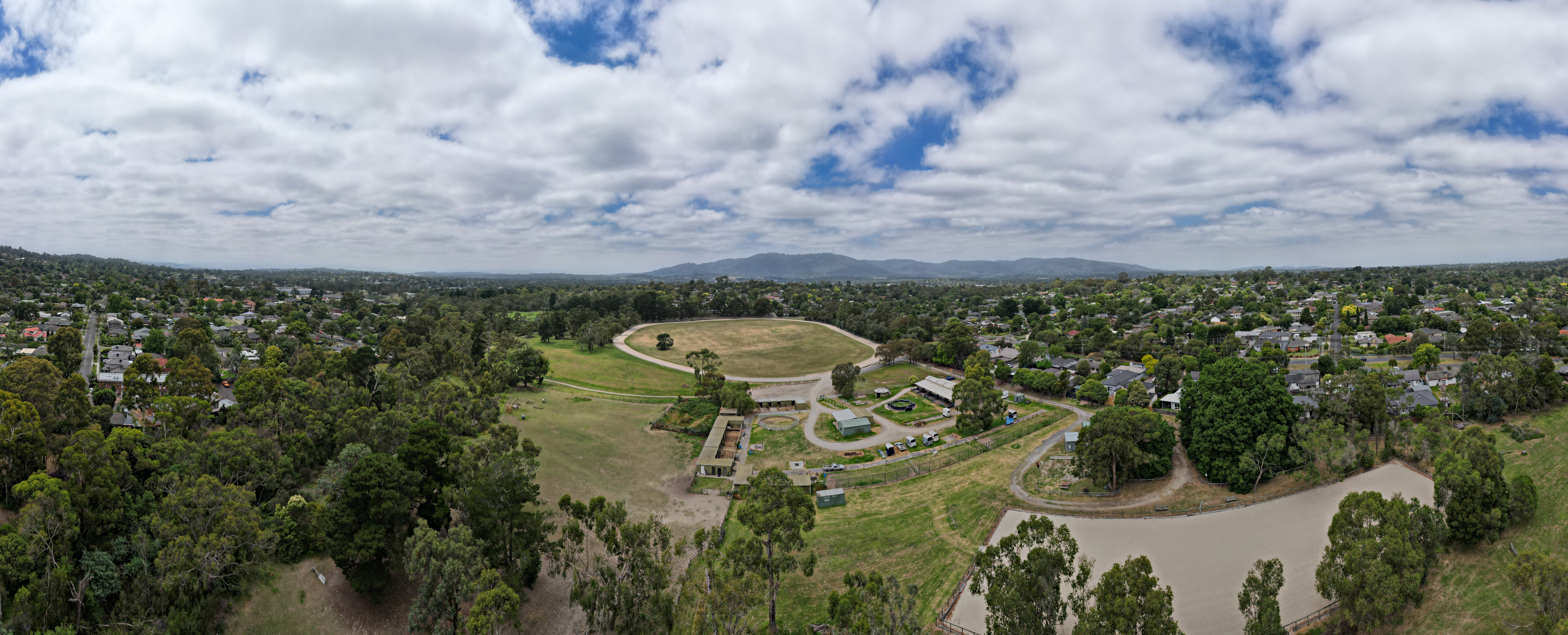
Croydon Hills Light Harness Club and Mount Dandenong on the horizon. Shot Jan 2023.

Croydon South is a suburb of Melbourne, Victoria, Australia, 29 kilometres (18 mi) east of Melbourne's Central Business District, located within the City of Maroondah local government area. Croydon South recorded a population of 4,759 at the 2021 census.

Croydon South has two main retail areas, Eastfield Shopping Centre on the corner of Eastfield and Bayswater Roads, and Merrindale Shopping Centre on Dorset Road. Croydon South is close to the foothills of Mount Dandenong and the Dandenong Ranges.

Croydon South Post Office opened on 1 February 1961 as the suburb was developed.

== Medical ==
Croydon South has a medical centre located in the Merrindale Shopping Centre. Croydon South is also located 2.5 km from Maroondah Hospital.

== Sport ==
The suburb has an Australian Rules football team, the South Croydon Bulldogs, who became the 2017 Division One premiers in the Eastern Football League. Croydon South has two cricket teams; South Croydon, based at Cheong Park and Eastfield, based at Benson Oval. Both the teams compete in the Ringwood District Cricket Association (RDCA). The South Croydon Youth Club (S.C.Y.C) Scorpions basketball club is also based at Cheong Park, offering basketball to local youth, age 6 to 18. There is also a netball team, SCYC Flames Inc Netball Club, which competes in the Lilydale-Yarra Valley Netball Association. Eastfield Park is also home to the Mountain District Horse and Pony Club, which is the oldest pony club in Victoria and now Australia. It was established in 1944 at Cheong Park and re-established at Eastfield Park in 1975.

== Education ==
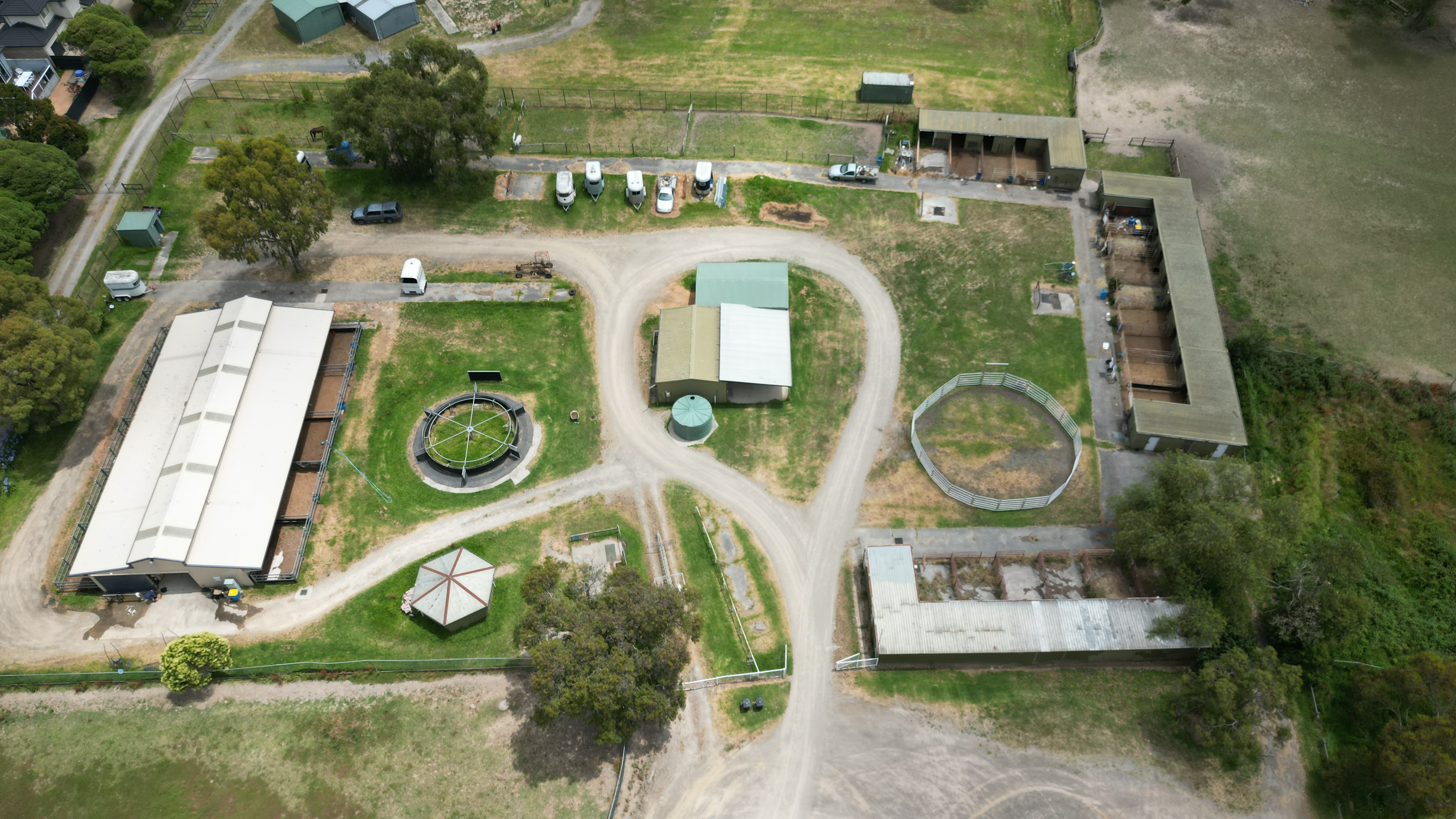
Croydon Light Harness Club from above. January 2023.

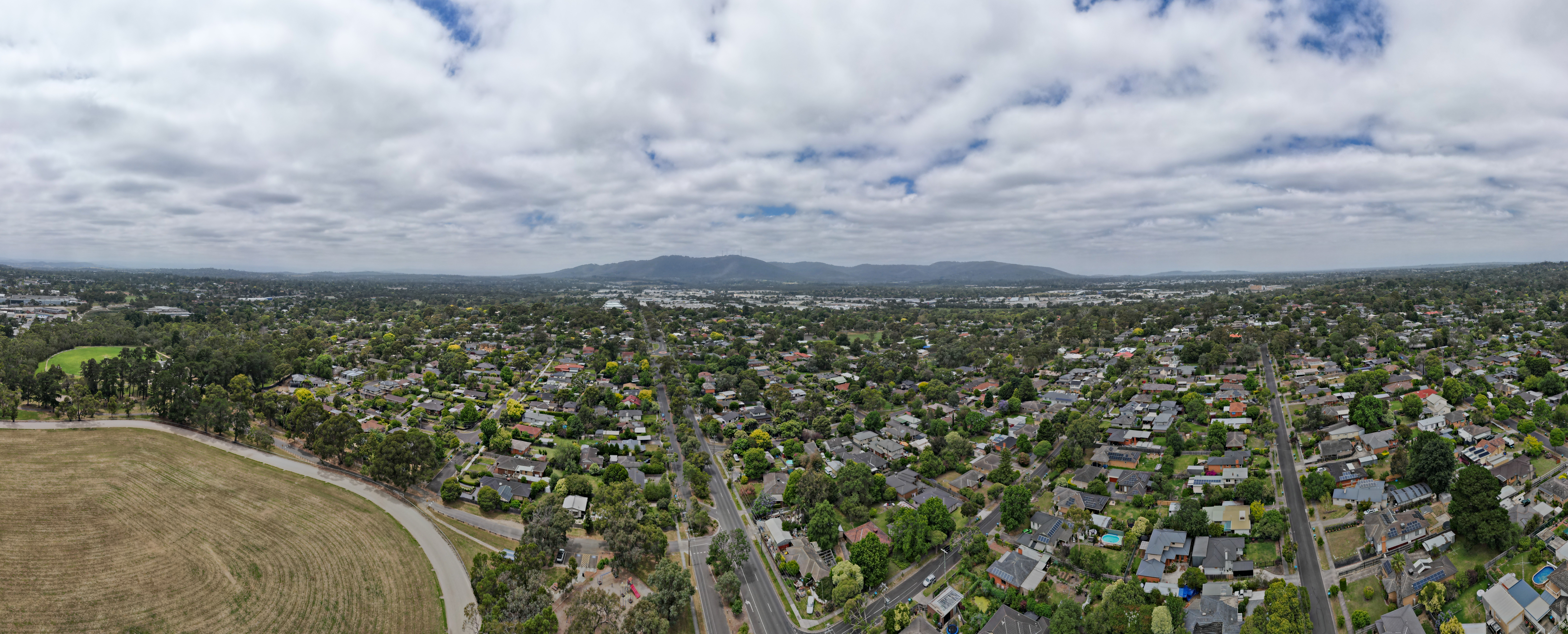
Aerial panorama of Mount Dandenong with Croydon in the foreground. Shot January 2023.

Tinternvale Primary School is located on Tintern Avenue, Ringwood East, and is on the border of Croydon South, Bayswater North and Ringwood East. It was established in 1976, and as of 2017, there were 330 enrolments of which 9% were non-native English speakers.

Croydon South Primary School was built in 1967, and was located on Belmont Road West, Croydon South. In July 2008, it was proposed that Croydon South Primary School and Tinternvale Primary School merge and be located on the site of Tinternvale, due to falling enrolments at Croydon South. The merger occurred at the start of the 2009 school year. The Education Department agreed to a large increase in funding for the merger at the Tinternvale site and to bring the newly merged school into line with current standards. Following the merger, Tinternvale Primary School had around 410 students.

Croydon Special Development School serves students between 3 and 18 years old. As of 2017, there were 102 students enrolled.

== See also ==
- City of Croydon – Croydon South was previously within this former local government area
