= Croydon Hills =

Croydon Hills Melbourne, Victoria
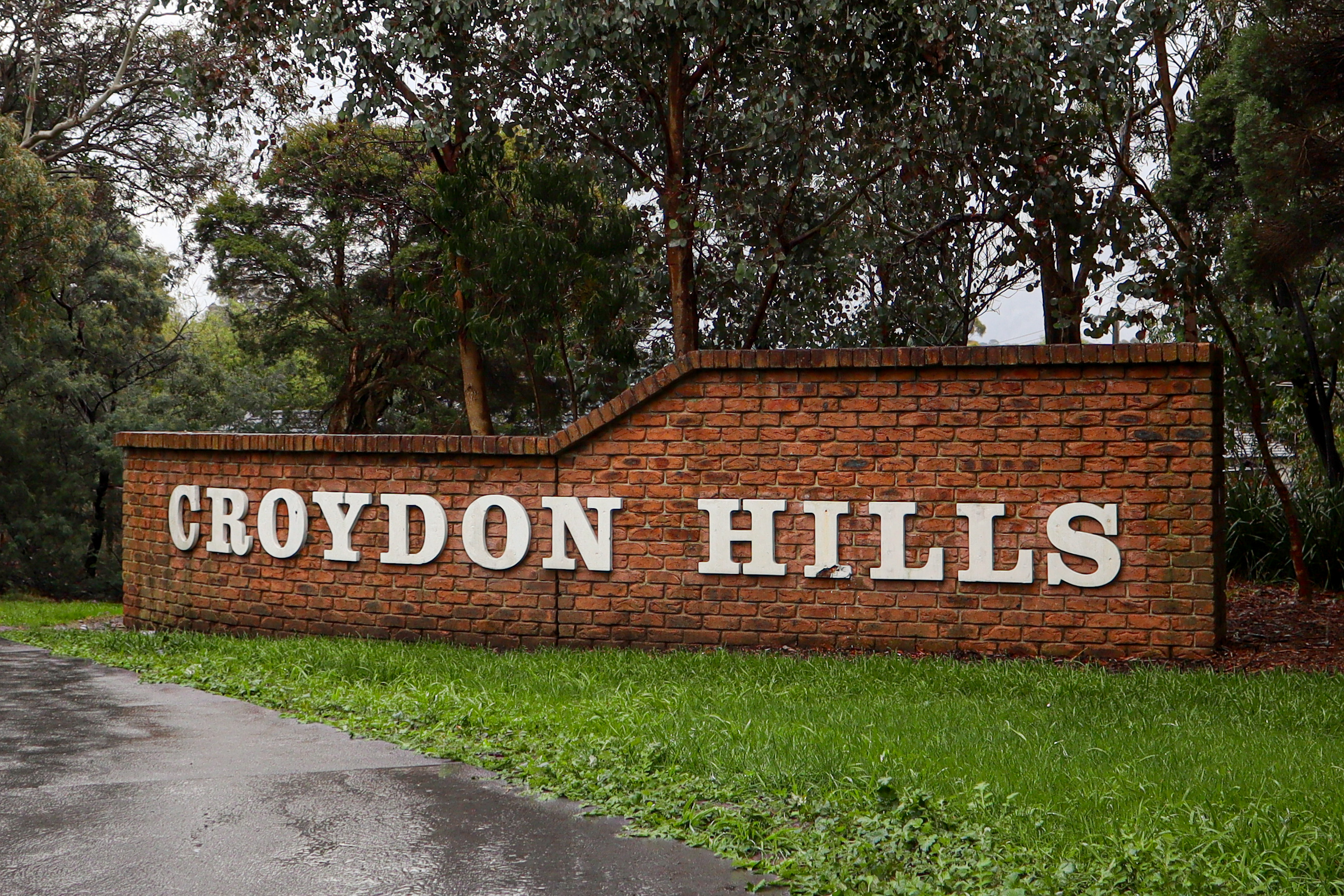
- Croydon Hills sign

- Coordinates: 37.774°S 145.266°E
- Population: 4,839 (2021 census)
  - Density: 2,100/km^{2} (5,450/sq mi)
- Postcode(s): 3136
- Elevation: 131 m (430 ft)
- Area: 2.3 km^{2} (0.9 sq mi)
- Location: 30 km (19 mi) E of Melbourne CBD (Central Melbourne)
- LGA(s): City of Maroondah
- County: Evelyn
- State electorate(s): Croydon; Warrandyte
- Federal division(s): Deakin; Menzies
Suburbs around Croydon Hills:
Warrandyte South	Wonga Park	Croydon North
Warranwood	Croydon Hills	Croydon North
Ringwood	Croydon	Croydon

Croydon Hills is a suburb of Melbourne, Victoria, Australia, 30 kilometres (19 mi) east of Melbourne's Central Business District, located within the City of Maroondah local government area. Croydon Hills recorded a population of 4,839 at the 2021 census.

Croydon Hills is bounded by Plymouth Road to the south, Yarra Road to the east and Bemboka Road to the west. The suburb is located in the outer east of Melbourne.

Approximately 5,600 people live in Croydon Hills, with the majority of household incomes between the $50k-80k and $80k-$100k mark.

The suburb was formerly mixed use farmland and orchards. It was developed into spacious suburban housing during the 1980s. The architectural style is typically single storey, brick veneer, with large allotments affording both front and rear gardens, as well as off-street parking for several vehicles.

Croydon Hills has many parks, with walking tracks and native bushlands, such as Settlers Orchard, Yarrunga Reserve, Candlebark Walk and Narr-Maen Reserve. Native birds such as the kookaburra, magpie, galah, sulphur crested cockatoo, magpie-lark, purple swamphen, Eurasian coot, Pacific black duck and Australian wood duck are a common sight in both the parklands and backyard gardens. The common brushtail possum inhabits the area.

Croydon Hills has several churches located in the suburb as well, including Baptist, Anglican and Presbyterian.

The nearest shopping areas are McAdam Square and Burnt Bridge. McAdam Square has a few different shops such as cafes, a supermarket, a fruit and vegetable shop, take-away shops, a travel shop, and a newsagency and post office.

== Education ==
A number of primary and secondary schools are well established in the surrounding Croydon and Ringwood North suburbs and thus the area is popular with young families.

There are three schools in Croydon Hills:

- Croydon Hills Primary School
- Good Shepherd Lutheran Primary School
- Luther College

Schools in surrounding areas include Yarra Valley Grammar, Melbourne Rudolf Steiner School, and Croydon Primary School.

== Public transport ==
The nearest train station is the Croydon railway station. There are few facilities within easy walking distance and most inhabitants rely on motor vehicles.

Buses in Croydon Hills are limited to the following routes:

- 668 Ringwood – Croydon via Croydon Hills (every day). Operated by Kinetic Melbourne This route operates between Ringwood and Croydon railway stations, via Croydon Hills.
- 672 Croydon - Chirnside park via Wonga park (Everyday except Sundays and public holidays). Operated by Ventura Bus Lines. This route operates between Croydon railway station and Chirnside Park Shopping Centre, Via Wonga park

== Notable people ==
- 360 (rapper) – attended Luther College, Croydon
- Matthew Haanappel- Paralympic Swimmer lived in the Croydon Hills area during his childhood
- Aaron Baddeley – attended Luther College, Croydon

== See also ==
- City of Croydon – former local government area which encompassed Croydon Hills
