= Bayswater North =

- Suburb
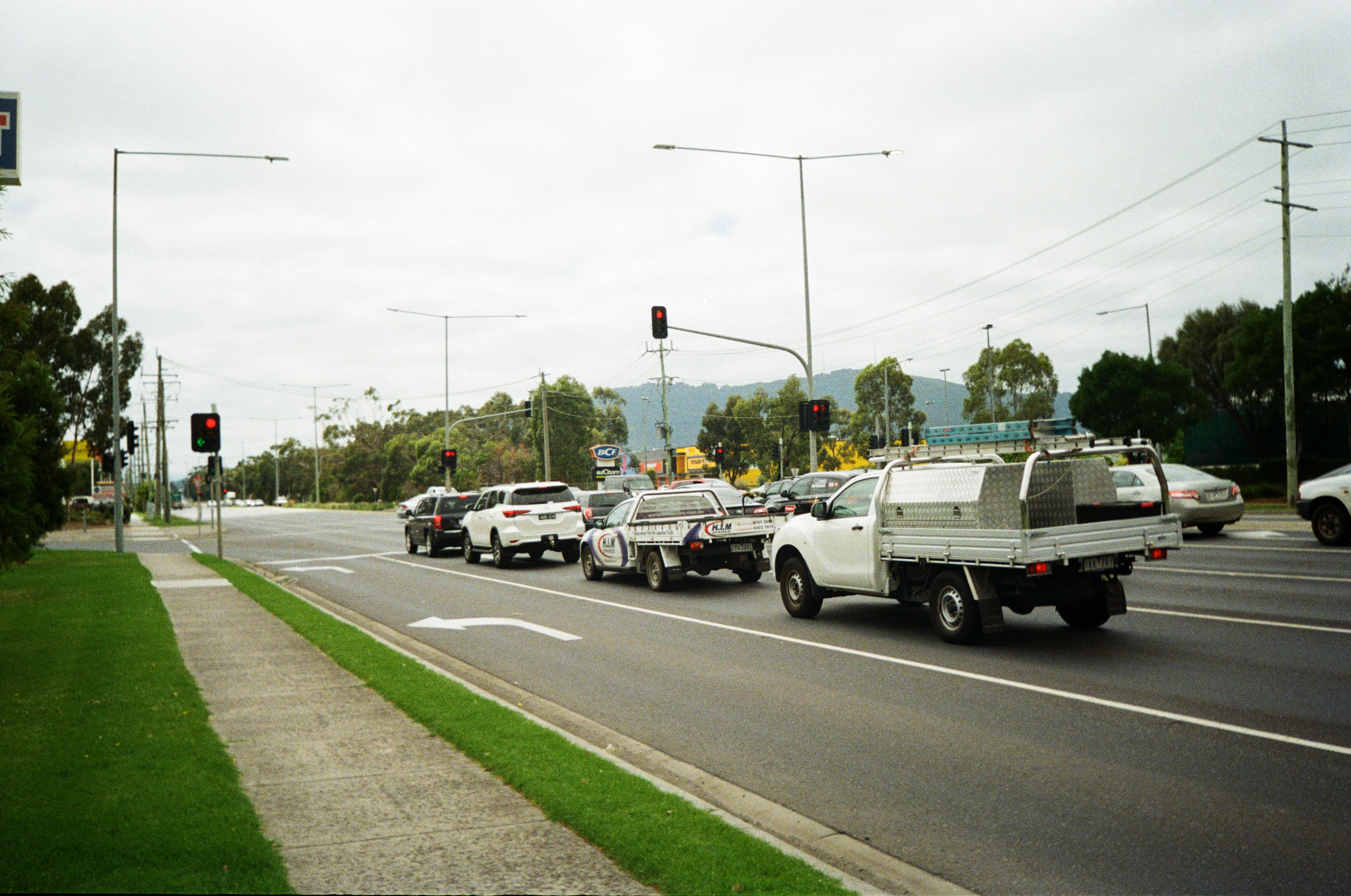
- Canterbury Road, Bayswater North

- Interactive map of Bayswater North
- Coordinates: 37.826°S 145.282°E
- Country: Australia
- State: Victoria
- City: Melbourne
- LGA: City of Maroondah
- Location: 29 km (18 mi) E of Melbourne CBD (Central Melbourne)

Government
  - State electorate: Croydon
  - Federal divisions: Deakin; Aston

Area
  - Total: 6.6 km^{2} (2.5 sq mi)
- Elevation: 113 m (371 ft)

Population
  - Total: 9,014 (2021 census)
  - Density: 1,366/km^{2} (3,537/sq mi)
- Postcode: 3153
Suburbs around Bayswater North
Ringwood East	Croydon South	Kilsyth
Heathmont	Bayswater North	Kilsyth South
Bayswater	Bayswater	Boronia

Bayswater North is a suburb of Melbourne, Victoria, Australia, 29 kilometres (18 mi) east from Melbourne's central business district, located within the City of Maroondah local government area. Bayswater North recorded a population of 9,014 at the 2021 census.

Bayswater North is part of a significant industrial and commercial precinct, which accommodates over 35,000 employees.

== Suburb features ==
Bayswater North shares its postcode of 3153 with the adjacent suburb of Bayswater and the suburb is often referred to by residents without the "North" part of the name. Many local businesses also drop this reference in advertising their location (e.g. large retailer Bunnings is located in Bayswater North but refers to its location as "Bayswater"). The official distinction between the two is that Bayswater North is the portion of the postcode area located in the City of Maroondah, whereas Bayswater is located in the City of Knox.

There is a small local shopping centre, Canterbury Gardens, which is anchored by a Woolworths supermarket. The majority of facilities for residents are located in Bayswater and nearby major shopping centres Westfield Knox and Eastland. A Bayswater North Post Office was open from 1962 until 1964.

=== Public transport ===
The nearest railway station is Bayswater railway station, on the Belgrave railway line. It is a Premium station and is located in Myki zone 2. Buses from several companies also service the area, linking residents directly with Bayswater station, surrounding suburbs and the retail and commercial precincts of Ringwood, Croydon and Westfield Knox.

== See also ==
- City of Croydon – Bayswater North was previously within this former local government area.
