= City of Croydon =

Coordinates: 37°47′46″S 145°16′52″E

City of Croydon Victoria
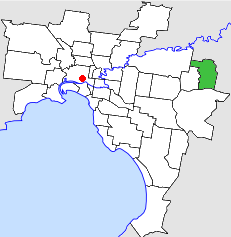
- Location in Melbourne
- The City of Croydon as at its dissolution in 1994
- Population: 48,900 (1992)
  - Density: 1,424.8/km^{2} (3,690/sq mi)
- Established: 24 May 1961
- Abolished: 15 December 1994
- Area: 34.32 km^{2} (13.3 sq mi)
- Council seat: Croydon
- Region: Eastern Melbourne
- County: Evelyn, Mornington
LGAs around City of Croydon:
Doncaster & Templestowe; Lillydale	Lillydale	Lillydale
Ringwood	City of Croydon	Lillydale
Knox	Knox	Knox

The City of Croydon was a local government area about 30 kilometres (19 mi) east of Melbourne, the state capital of Victoria, Australia. The city covered an area of 34.32 square kilometres (13.25 sq mi), and existed from 1961 until 1994.

== History ==
Croydon was originally part of the Shire of Lillydale, which was incorporated as a district on 19 September 1856, and as a shire in 1872. Croydon itself became the centre of a severance movement, and was incorporated as a shire on 24 May 1961. After much local debate, it was proclaimed as a city on 22 May 1971.

On 15 December 1994, the City of Croydon was abolished, and along with the City of Ringwood, was merged into the newly created City of Maroondah.

Council meetings were held at the Municipal Offices on Civic Drive, off Mount Dandenong Road, Croydon. It presently serves as a service centre and library for the City of Maroondah.

== Wards ==
The City of Croydon was subdivided into three wards, each electing three councillors:

- North Ward
- Centre Ward
- South Ward

== Suburbs ==
- Bayswater (shared with the City of Knox)
- Bayswater North
- Croydon*
- Croydon Hills
- Croydon North
- Croydon South
- Kilsyth (shared with the Shire of Lillydale)
- Warranwood

* Council seat.

== Population ==
Year	Population
1961	15,694
1966	21,757
1971	28,708
1976	33,474
1981	36,210
1986	40,096
1991	45,807

* Estimate in the 1958 Victorian Year Book.
