= City of Ringwood =

Coordinates: 37°48′32″S 145°13′48″E

City of Ringwood Victoria
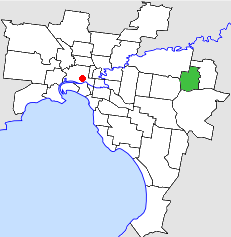
- Location in Melbourne
- The City of Ringwood as at its dissolution in 1994
- Population: 42,200 (1992)
  - Density: 1,854.1/km^{2} (4,802/sq mi)
- Established: 22 October 1924
- Abolished: 15 December 1994
- Area: 22.76 km^{2} (8.8 sq mi)
- Council seat: Ringwood
- Region: Eastern Melbourne
- County: Mornington
LGAs around City of Ringwood:
Doncaster & Templestowe	Croydon	Croydon
Nunawading	City of Ringwood	Croydon
Nunawading	Knox	Knox

The City of Ringwood was a local government area about 25 kilometres (16 mi) east of Melbourne, the state capital of Victoria, Australia. The city covered an area of 22.76 square kilometres (8.79 sq mi), and existed from 1924 until 1994.

== History ==
Ringwood was originally part of the Shire of Lillydale, which was incorporated as a road district on 19 September 1856, and as a shire in 1872. Ringwood itself was severed and incorporated as a borough on 22 October 1924. It was proclaimed a city on 19 March 1960.

On 15 December 1994, the City of Ringwood was abolished, and along with the City of Croydon, was merged into the City of Maroondah.

Council meetings were held at the Municipal Offices, on Mines Road, Ringwood. It presently serves as the council seat for the City of Maroondah.

== Wards ==
The City of Ringwood was subdivided into three wards, each electing three councillors:

- North Ward
- South Ward
- East Ward

== Suburbs ==
- Heathmont
- Ringwood*
- Ringwood East
- Ringwood North (shared with the City of Doncaster & Templestowe)

* Council seat.

== Population ==
Year	Population
1954	12,951
1958	20,600*
1961	24,427
1966	29,131
1971	34,751
1976	37,085
1981	38,665
1986	40,289
1991	40,308

* Estimate in the 1958 Victorian Year Book.
