= City of Maroondah =

- Local government area
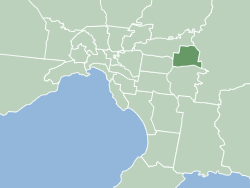
- Map of Melbourne showing Maroondah City Council

- Interactive map of City of Maroondah
- Coordinates: 37°48′24″S 145°15′48″E
- Country: Australia
- State: Victoria
- Region: Greater Melbourne
- City: Melbourne
- Established: 15 December 1994
- Council seat: Ringwood

Government
  - Mayor: Cr Linda Hancock
  - State electorates: Croydon; Glen Waverley; Ringwood; Warrandyte
  - Federal divisions: Aston; Deakin

Area
  - Total: 61.2 km^{2} (23.6 sq mi)

Population
  - Total: 115,043 (2021)
  - Density: 1,879.8/km^{2} (4,869/sq mi)
- Time zone: UTC+10 (AEST)
  - Summer (DST): UTC+11 (AEDT)
- County: Mornington; Evelyn
- Website: City of Maroondah
LGAs around City of Maroondah
Manningham	Manningham	Yarra Ranges
Whitehorse	City of Maroondah	Yarra Ranges
Knox	Knox	Yarra Ranges

The City of Maroondah is a local government area in Victoria, Australia, in the eastern suburbs of Melbourne. Maroondah had a population of 115,043 in August 2021.

Suburbs located in the City include Ringwood, Croydon, Heathmont, Ringwood East, Ringwood North, Warranwood, Croydon North, Croydon South, Croydon Hills, Bayswater North and parts of Kilsyth South, Vermont and Park Orchards.

The Lilydale and Belgrave railway lines run through the City of Maroondah, with stations at Heatherdale, Ringwood, Ringwood East, Croydon, and Heathmont. The Maroondah City Council is served by many buses operated by Ventura, Kinetic, McKenzies and V/Line.

Maroondah Hospital, a large public hospital located in Ringwood East serves Maroondah and the surrounding areas.

== History ==
The City of Maroondah was created through the amalgamation the former Cities of Ringwood and Croydon on 15 December 1994. The name 'Maroondah' was taken from two Aboriginal words - meaning "throwing" and "leaf" - symbolising the green environment.

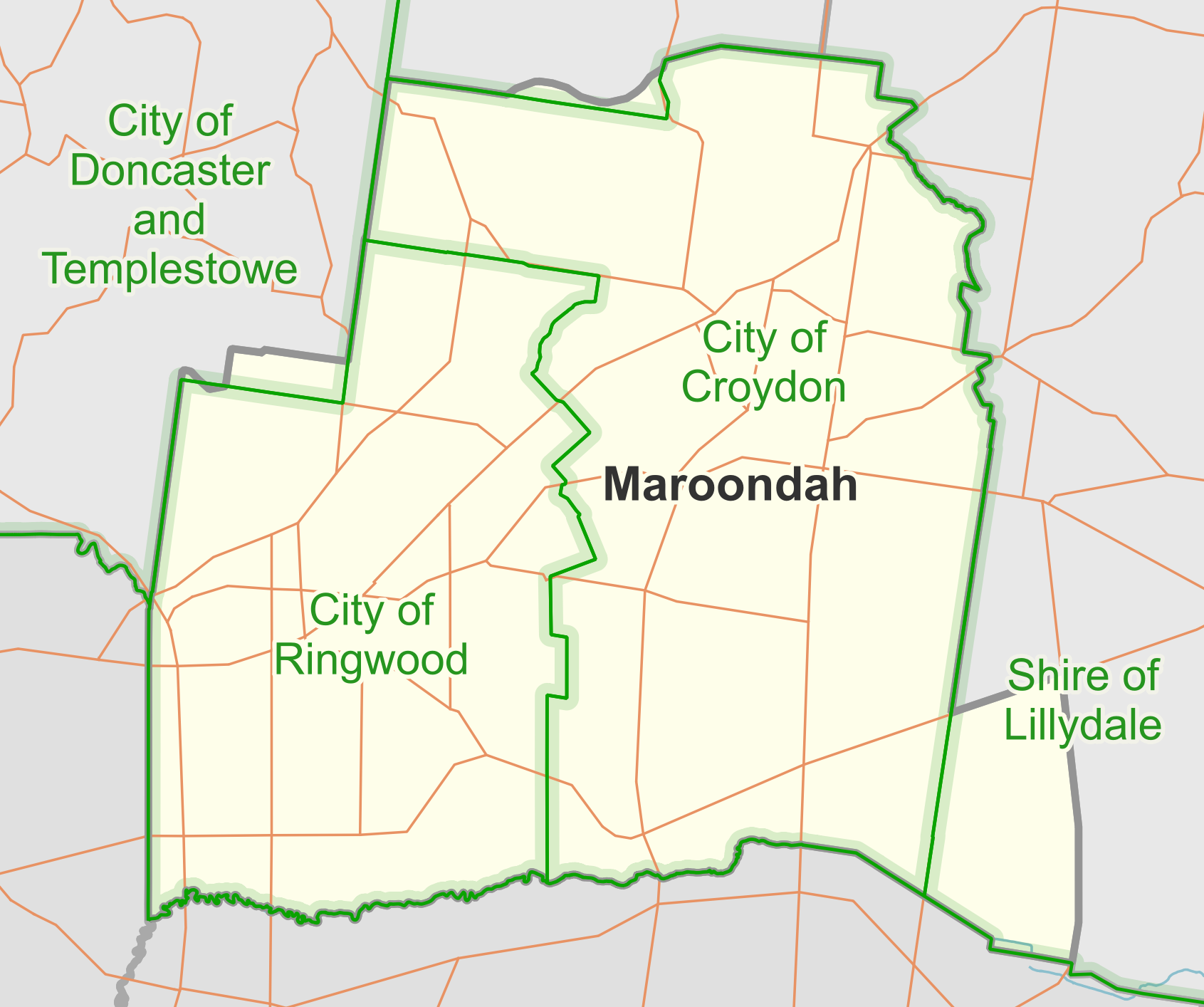
The City of Maroondah's predecessor LGAs (green) as they were in 1994

== Education ==
Maroondah residents have a selection of state and private schools that attract students from across the eastern suburbs of Melbourne.

=== Primary schools ===
- Ainslie Parklands Primary School
- Bayswater North Primary School
- Croydon Hills Primary School
- Croydon Primary School
- Dorset Primary School
- Eastwood Primary School
- Good Shepherd Lutheran Primary School
- Great Ryrie Primary School
- Heathmont East Primary School
- Holy Spirit Community School
- Kalinda Primary School
- Marlborough Primary School
- Mullum Primary School
- Our Lady of Perpetual Help Primary School
- Ringwood Heights Primary School
- Ringwood North Primary School
- Ruskin Park Primary School
- Sacred Heart Primary School
- Tinternvale Primary School
- Village School
- Warranwood Primary School
- Yarra Road Primary School

=== Secondary schools ===
- Aquinas College
- Croydon Community School
- Heathmont College
- Luther College
- Melba College
- Norwood Secondary College
- Ringwood Secondary College

=== Combined schools ===
- Melbourne Rudolf Steiner School
- Tintern Grammar
- Yarra Valley Grammar

=== Special schools ===
- Croydon Special Developmental School

=== Universities ===
- Swinburne University of Technology - Croydon Campus

== Townships and localities ==
The city had a population of 115,043 at the 2021 census, up from 110,376 at the 2016 census.

Population
Locality	2016	2021
Bayswater North	8,789	9,014
Croydon	26,946	28,608
Croydon Hills	4,992	4,839
Croydon North	7,860	8,092
Croydon South	4,572	4,759
Heathmont	9,688	9,933
Kilsyth^	10,891	11,699
Kilsyth South	2,988	2,862
Park Orchards^	3,822	3,835
Ringwood	17,471	19,144
Ringwood East	10,265	10,764
Ringwood North^	9,832	9,964
Vermont^	10,442	10,993
Warranwood	4,807	4,820
Wonga Park^	3,796	3,843

^ - Territory divided with another LGA

== Libraries ==
There are two libraries located in the Maroondah region, both managed by Eastern Regional Libraries.

- Realm - Ringwood Town Square, 179 Maroondah Highway, Ringwood (opposite Ringwood Station)
- Croydon Library - Civic Square, Mount Dandenong Road, Croydon

== Councillors and wards ==
The City of Maroondah has nine wards, each electing a single member:

Ward	Party	Councillor	Notes
Barngeong	Independent	Chris Jones	Deputy Mayor
Bungalook	Independent	Catherine Gordon	
Jubilee	Independent Liberal	Claire Rex	
McAlpin	Independent Liberal	Nathaniel Henderson	
Tarralla	Independent Labor	Paul Macdonald	
Wicklow	Independent	Daniella Heatherich	
Wombolano	Independent Liberal	Kylie Spears	
Wonga	Independent Liberal	Linda Hancock	
Yarrunga	Independent	Rob Steane	Mayor

== Shopping Centres ==
There are two main shopping precincts in Maroondah.

- Eastland Shopping Centre - Maroondah Highway, Ringwood
- Croydon Central - Kent Avenue, Croydon

== Sister cities ==
As of 2023 the City of Maroondah has four sister cities.

- Croydon, United Kingdom
- Ringwood, United Kingdom
- Ringwood, United States
- San Carlos, United States

== See also ==
- List of places on the Victorian Heritage Register in the City of Maroondah
- List of Melbourne suburbs
