= Wonga Park =

- Town
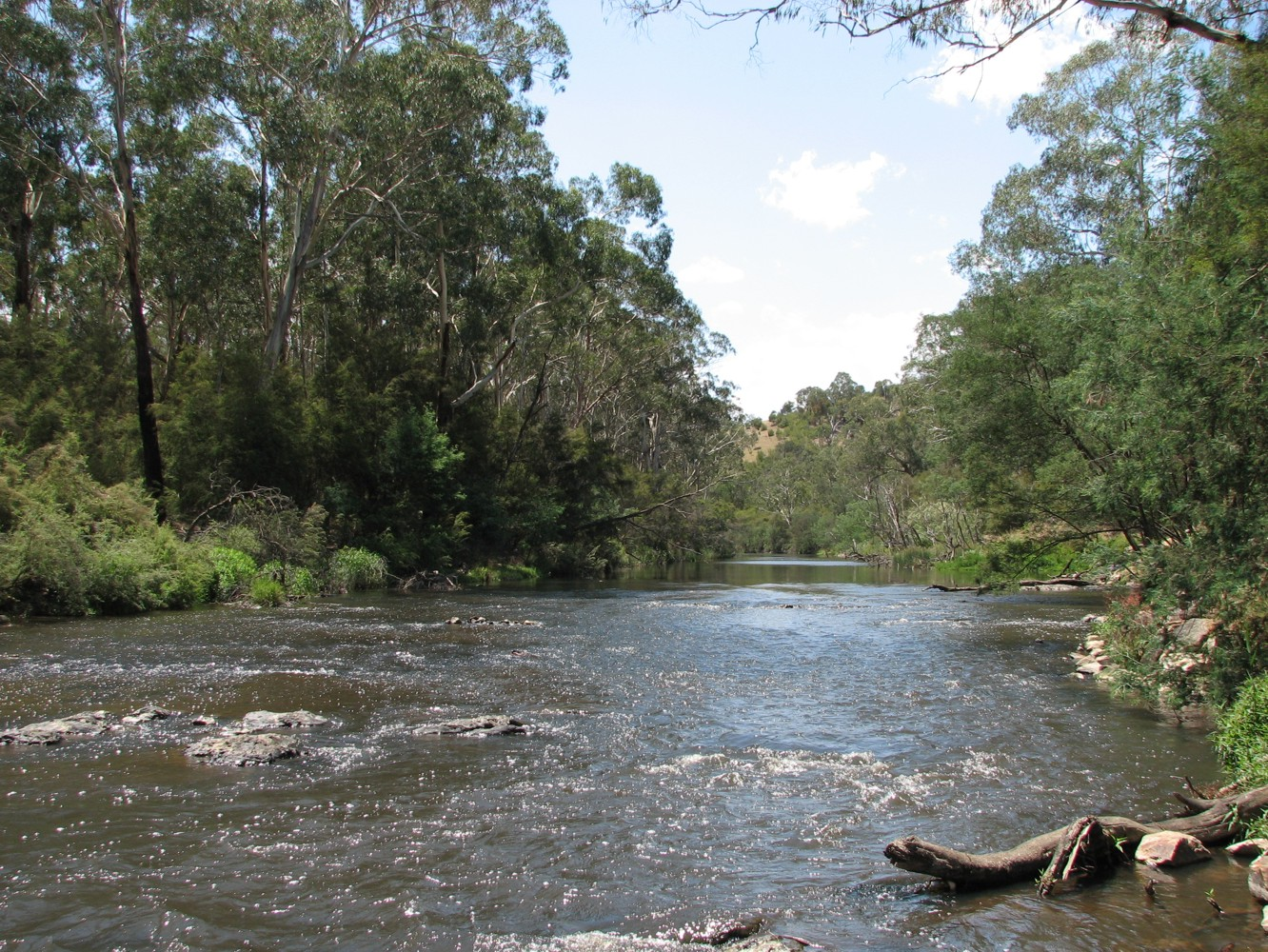
- Yarra River, Wonga Park

- Interactive map of Wonga Park
- Coordinates: 37.739°S 145.267°E
- Country: Australia
- State: Victoria
- Region: Greater Melbourne
- City: Melbourne
- LGAs: City of Manningham; City of Maroondah; Yarra Ranges Shire
- Location: 33 km (21 mi) from Melbourne CBD

Government
  - State electorates: Croydon; Evelyn; Warrandyte
  - Federal division: Casey

Area
  - Total: 23.1 km^{2} (8.9 sq mi)
- Elevation: 105 m (344 ft)

Population
  - Total: 3,843 (2021 census)
  - Density: 166.4/km^{2} (430.9/sq mi)
- Postcode: 3115
Localities around Wonga Park
Warrandyte North	Kangaroo Ground	Bend of Islands
Warrandyte	Wonga Park	Chirnside Park
Warrandyte South	Croydon Hills	Croydon North

Wonga Park is a locality on the edge of Greater Melbourne, beyond the Melbourne Metropolitan Urban Growth Boundary area, 33 kilometres (21 mi) north-east from Melbourne's Central Business District, located within the Cities of Manningham and Maroondah and the Shire of Yarra Ranges local government areas. Wonga Park recorded a population of 3,843 at the 2021 census.

Wonga Park is bounded in the west by Jumping Creek, in the north by the Yarra River, in the east by Brushy Park and Old Homestead Roads and in the south by Holloway Road.

The name comes from the Wonga Park grazing property, which itself derives from Simon Wonga, elder of the Wurundjeri Indigenous people of Melbourne. The area was part of Mooroolbark until the 1890s.

== History ==
Eight Hour Pioneer Settlement Post Office opened in 1902, was renamed Wonga Park around 1907 and closed in 1989. It reopened in its current location in 1994.

One of the grazing properties, Yarra Brae, was bought by Lord Clifford circa 1941. Part of it was made available for the 3rd Pan Pacific Scout Jamboree in 1948. It also hosted the 5th Pan Pacific Scout Jamboree in 1955. It is now a Scouts Australia campsite.

In 1972, Yarra Brae was the site of a proposed dam, but residents of the nearby Bend of Isles bushland estate persuaded the Victorian Government to abandon the proposal by 1974.

The residential development of Wonga Park came after the subdivisions in Croydon and Mooroolbark, which were on the Maroondah Highway and a railway line. Residential living is most concentrated around the old village settlement where the church, hall, sports facilities, fire station and local shops are found.

The northern boundary of Wonga Park, where land was acquired for the Yarra Brae storage, is a linear riverside part of the Warrandyte State Park. Wonga Park is characterised by low-density residential development with large lot sizes, reflecting its Low Density Residential zoning within metropolitan Melbourne, with many of the residential blocks being large in size, creating a private sanctuary for many of its residents.

Notable residents include singer John Farnham and V8 Supercar driver Garth Tander.

== Sport and recreation ==
Wonga Park has a tennis club, cricket club, soccer club and horse riding facilities. The Clifford Park Activity Centre is also located in Wonga Park.

== See also ==
- Shire of Lillydale – Wonga Park was previously within this former local government area.
