= Electoral district of Croydon (Victoria) =

State electoral district of Victoria, Australia

Coordinates: 37.79°S 145.28°E

Croydon Victoria—Legislative Assembly
- Interactive map of electoral district boundaries from the 2022 state election
- State: Victoria
- Created: 2014
- MP: David Hodgett
- Party: Liberal
- Namesake: Suburb of Croydon
- Electors: 42,995 (2018)
- Area: 42 km^{2} (16.2 sq mi)
- Demographic: Metropolitan
Electorates around Croydon:
Warrandyte	Warrandyte	Evelyn
Ringwood	Croydon	Evelyn
Ringwood	Bayswater	Monbulk

The electoral district of Croydon is an electoral district of the Victorian Legislative Assembly, located in the east of Melbourne. It was created in the redistribution of electoral boundaries in 2013, and came into effect at the 2014 state election.

It largely covers the area of the abolished district of Kilsyth, covering outer eastern suburbs in Melbourne. As of the 2022 Victorian state election, the seat contains the suburbs of Croydon, Croydon Hills, Croydon North, Croydon South, Mooroolbark, Kilsyth, Kilsyth South and Bayswater North in the local government areas of Maroondah City and Yarra Ranges Shire.

The abolished seat of Kilsyth was held by Liberal MP David Hodgett, who retained the new seat at the 2014 election.

== Members ==
Member	Party	Term
David Hodgett	Liberal	2014–present

== Election results ==
2022 Victorian state election: Croydon
Party	Candidate	Votes	%	±%
Liberal	David Hodgett	19,605	43.0	−3.4
Labor	Sorina Grasso	15,564	34.1	−5.5
Greens	Brendan Powell	4,940	10.8	+1.9
Family First	Dan Nebauer	2,051	4.5	+4.5
Democratic Labour	Sophia De Wit	1,978	4.3	+4.3
Animal Justice	Harley McDonald-Eckersall	1,501	3.3	−1.2
Total formal votes		45,639	95.7	+0.9
Informal votes		2,054	4.3	−0.9
Turnout		47,693	90.8	+0.8
Two-party-preferred result
Liberal	David Hodgett	23,446	51.4	+0.4
Labor	Sorina Grasso	22,193	48.6	−0.4
Liberal hold		Swing	+0.4	

Two-party-preferred vote results in Croydon View source data.
