= Montrose, Victoria =

Montrose
- Suburb
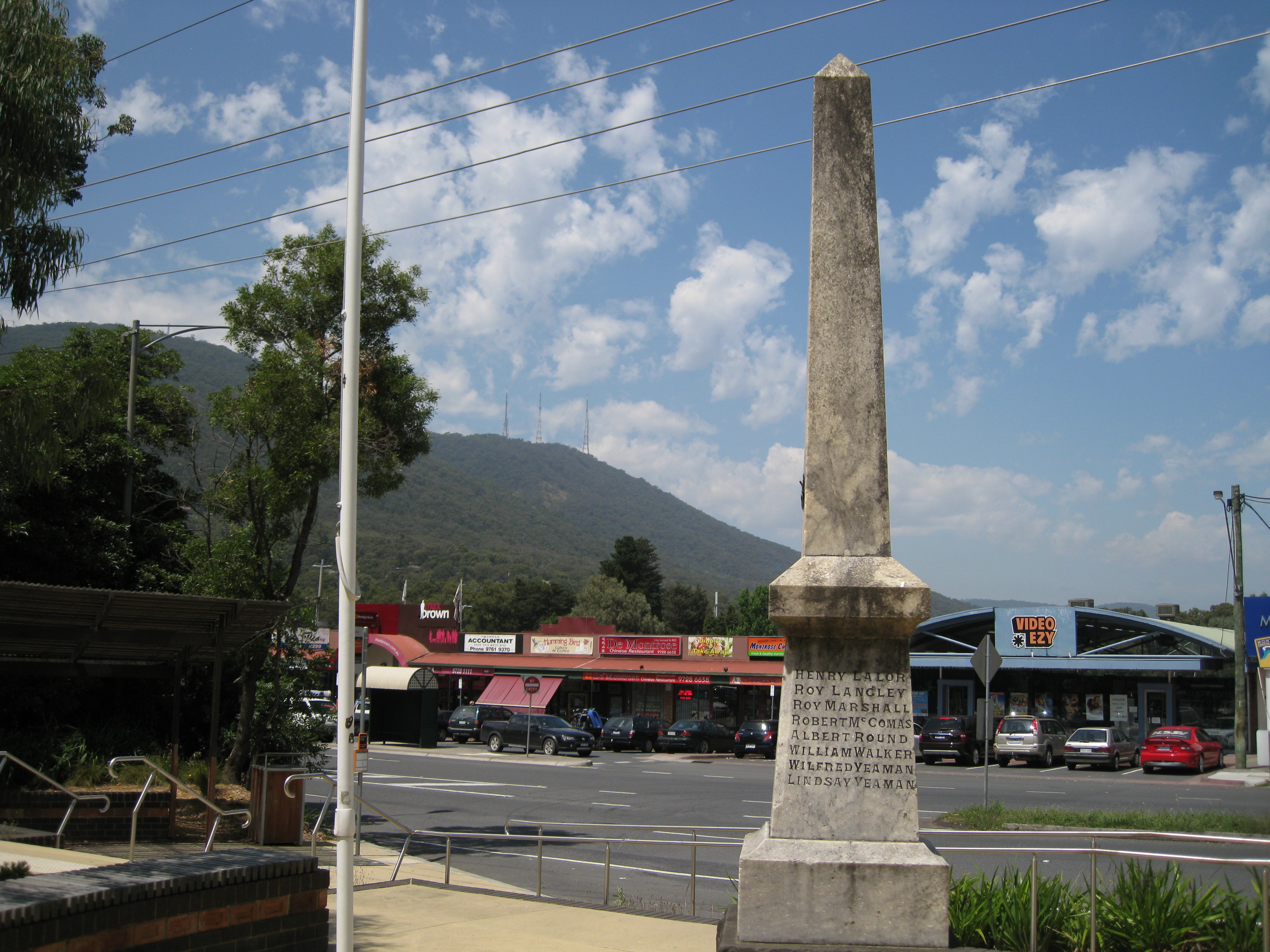
- War memorial in the centre of Montrose, with the Dandenong Ranges in the background

- Interactive map of Montrose
- Coordinates: 37.81°S 145.343°E
- Country: Australia
- State: Victoria
- City: Melbourne
- LGA: Shire of Yarra Ranges
- Location: 33 km (21 mi) from Melbourne; 8 km (5.0 mi) from Lilydale; 12 km (7.5 mi) from Ringwood
- Established: 1892 (previously South Mooroolbark)

Government
  - State electorate: Monbulk
  - Federal division: Casey

Area
  - Total: 11 km^{2} (4.2 sq mi)

Population
  - Total: 6,900 (2021 census)
  - Density: 630/km^{2} (1,620/sq mi)
- Postcode: 3765
Suburbs around Montrose
Mooroolbark	Lilydale	Mount Evelyn
Kilsyth	Montrose	Silvan
Bayswater North	Mount Dandenong	Kalorama

Montrose is a suburb in Melbourne, Victoria, Australia, 33 km east of Melbourne's central business district, located within the Shire of Yarra Ranges local government area. Montrose recorded a population of 6,900 at the 2021 census.

Montrose varies in altitude from about 91 m to 324 m above sea level. Montrose covers an area of 11 square kilometres (2,700 acres).

Montrose is situated at the foothills of Mount Dandenong.

== History ==
European settlers initially referred to the area of Montrose as South Mooroolbark, and used the land for farming during the late 1800s. The town was also informally called Double Pitts after the double-handed saw pit method used in the local timber industry. The settlement was renamed to Montrose in 1892 by local landowner James Walker, whose son had a store on Colchester Road, Kilsyth named Rose Mont. A post office was opened in December 1898, and closed in July 1994. During the late 1800s and early 1900s, Montrose was used extensively for orchards, partly due to its high rainfall. In 1911 the population of Montrose was only 133. However, residential development increased in the 1920s, providing accommodation for tourists and permanent residents.

The Montrose Public Hall was funded by the local community and opened in July 1914, on the eve of World War I. A monument for World War I was constructed in 1921, which also became a memorial for World War II in 1947. The population of Montrose boomed after World War II, resulting in many more young families. An infant health centre was opened in 1949. A bushfire in 1961 destroyed 23 houses. By the 1970s Montrose had become part of the sprawl of suburbs extending into the Dandenongs.

In 2024, the (peak-hour) congested roundabout to the town was removed.

== Education ==
Montrose incorporates two government primary schools:

- Montrose Primary School, located on Leith Road and established in 1880 (previously called Mooroolbark South Primary School and Double Pitts School)
- Billanook Primary School, located on Sheffield Road and established in 1980

== Recreation ==
=== Montrose Recreation Reserve ===
The Montrose Recreation Reserve is home to several sporting clubs and a scout group, and provides a range of facilities including a playground and barbecues. The reserve is a popular destination for families and features a playground largely made from a recycled plastic as well as some artwork by local artists.

=== Sporting clubs ===
Montrose also has a range of sporting clubs:

- Montrose Tennis Club, adjacent to Montrose Recreation Reserve
- Montrose Netball Club, located next to the Montrose Football Club
- Montrose Social Soccer Club, based at Keith Hume Fraser Reserve
- Montrose Football Club, home to the Montrose Demons which compete in the Eastern Football League
- Montrose Cricket Club, based at Montrose Recreation Reserve and home to the Montrose Wolves
- Montrose Calisthenics Club

=== Community groups ===
- Montrose Coterie Group
- Montrose & District Lions Club
- Montrose Senior Citizens
- Montrose CFA
- Montrose Environmental Group

== Transport ==
The closest railway station is Mooroolbark railway station on the Lilydale line, approximately 5.7 km from Montrose. Telebus services operate in the area, and passengers can request to be picked up or dropped off from home.

== Churches ==
- Church of Christ Montrose
- Montrose Spiritualist Church
- Montrose Uniting Church

== Notable people ==
Kevin Heinze was a pioneering presenter of gardening on television in Australia. He hosted a gardening program for ABC Television titled Sow What, which was mostly shot on location at his one-hectare home garden in Montrose, from 1967 to 1988. Heinze died on 1 September 2008, aged 80. In 2005 the garden was donated to the local shire council for public use.

Montrose was home to the museum of the Australian author May Gibbs who created the Gumnut Babies series.
