= Kilsyth South, Victoria =

Kilsyth South Melbourne, Victoria
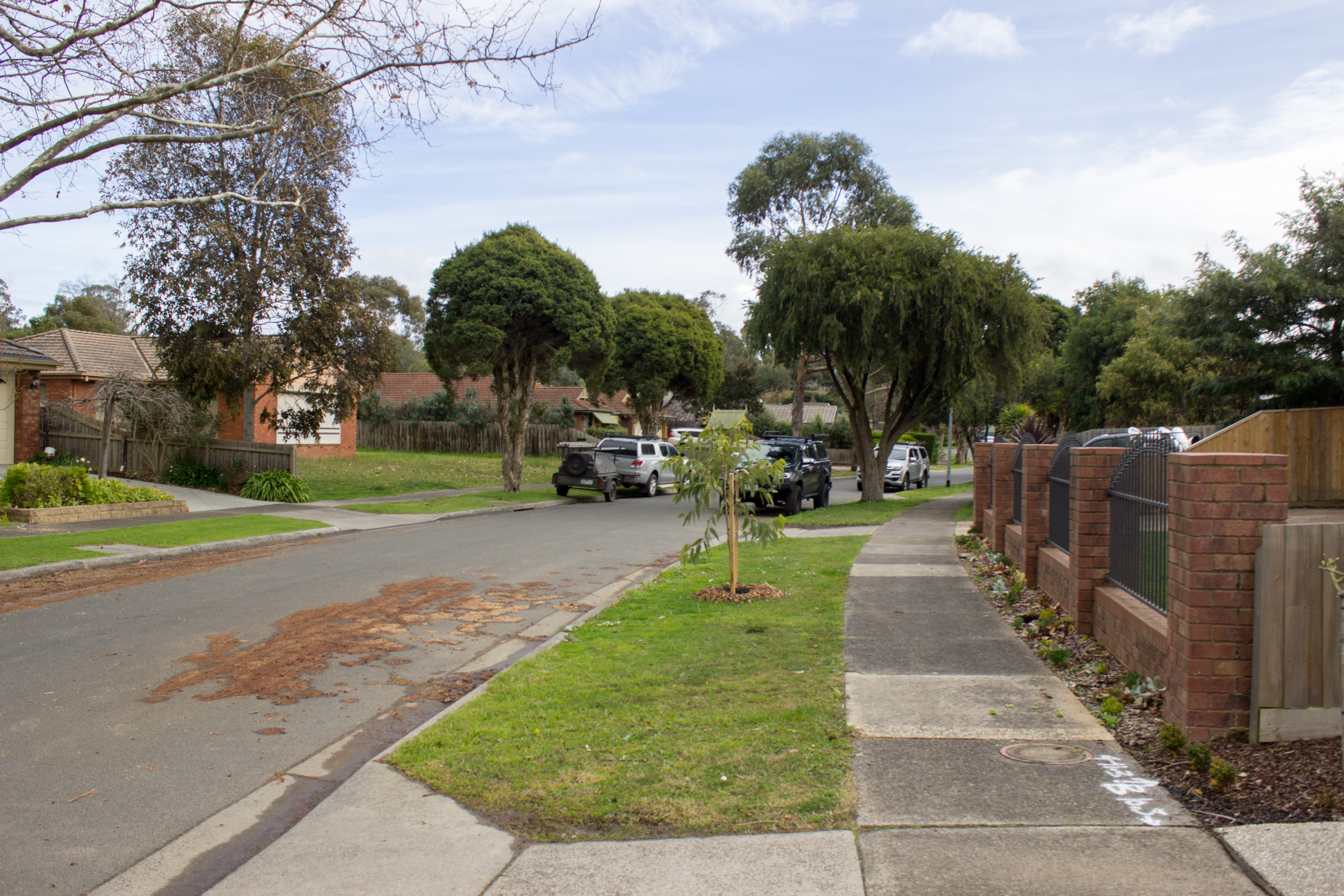
- Ormond Place, Kilsyth South

- Coordinates: 37°49′52″S 145°18′37″E
- Population: 2,862 (2021 census)
  - Density: 842/km^{2} (2,180/sq mi)
- Postcode(s): 3137
- Elevation: 122 m (400 ft)
- Area: 3.4 km^{2} (1.3 sq mi)
- Location: 32 km (20 mi) from Melbourne CBD
- LGA(s): City of Maroondah
- State electorate(s): Croydon
- Federal division(s): Aston
Suburbs around Kilsyth South:
Bayswater North	Kilsyth	Kilsyth
Bayswater North	Kilsyth South	Kilsyth
Boronia	Boronia	The Basin

Kilsyth South is a suburb of Melbourne, Victoria, Australia, 32 kilometres (20 mi) east from Melbourne's Central Business District, located within the City of Maroondah local government area. Kilsyth South recorded a population of 2,862 at the 2021 census.

The bushland of the suburb is the only place where the Kilsyth South Spider Orchid is found.

== See also ==
- Shire of Lillydale – Kilsyth South was previously within this former local government area.
- Population of Kilsyth South
