= Kilsyth, Victoria =

Kilsyth
- Suburb
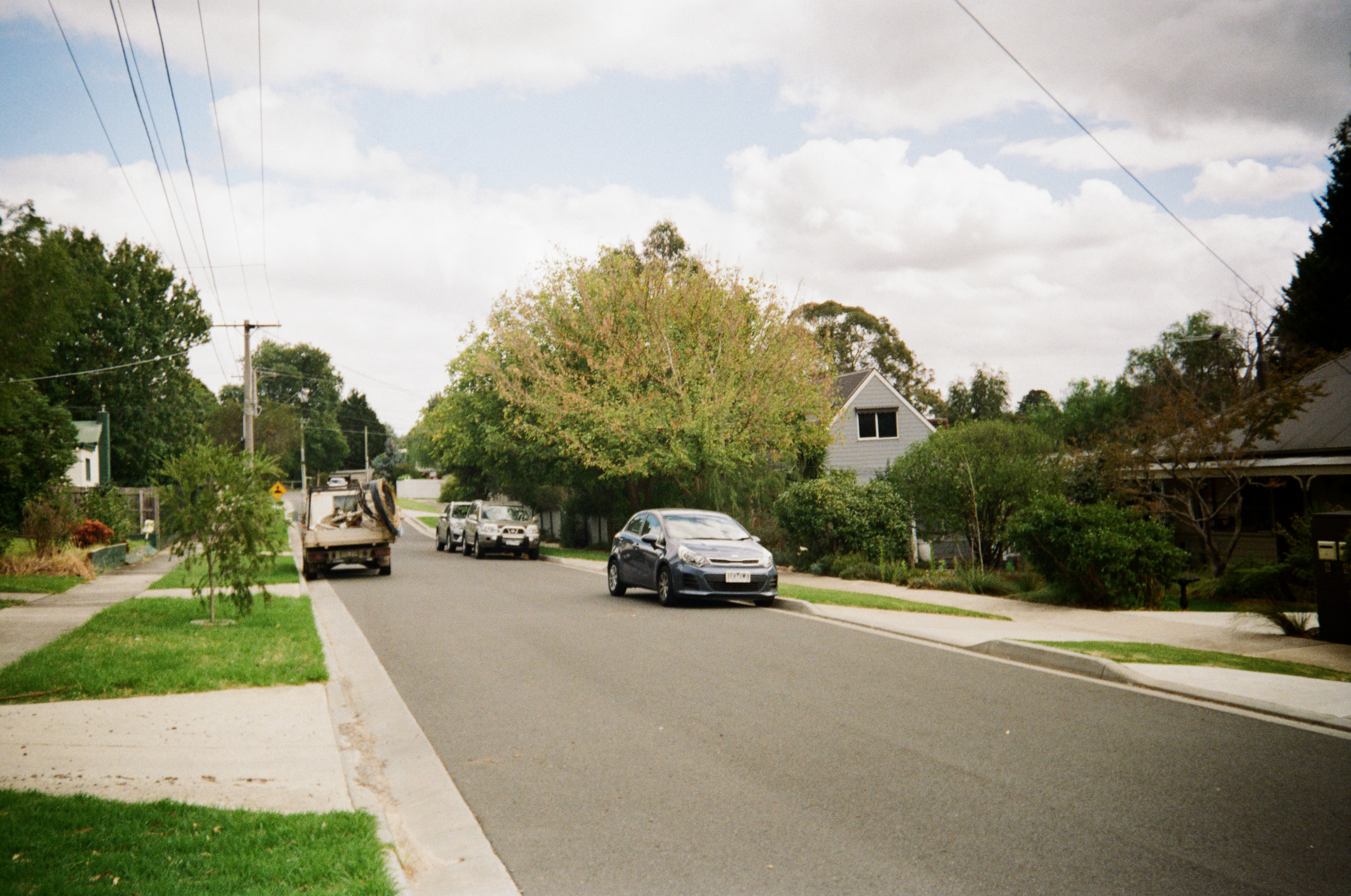
- Montgomery Court, Kilsyth

- Interactive map of Kilsyth
- Coordinates: 37.802°S 145.316°E
- Country: Australia
- State: Victoria
- City: Melbourne
- LGAs: City of Maroondah; Shire of Yarra Ranges
- Location: 32 km (20 mi) from Melbourne CBD; 8 km (5.0 mi) from Lilydale

Government
  - State electorate: Croydon
  - Federal divisions: Casey; Deakin

Area
  - Total: 9.4 km^{2} (3.6 sq mi)
- Elevation: 113 m (371 ft)

Population
  - Total: 11,699 (2021 census)
  - Density: 1,245/km^{2} (3,223/sq mi)
- Postcode: 3137
Suburbs around Kilsyth
Croydon	Mooroolbark	Montrose
Croydon	Kilsyth	Montrose
Croydon South	Kilsyth South	The Basin

Kilsyth (/ˈkɪlsaɪθ/) is a suburb of Melbourne, Victoria, Australia, 32 kilometres (20 mi) east from Melbourne's central business district (CBD), located within the City of Maroondah and the Shire of Yarra Ranges local government areas. Kilsyth recorded a population of 11,699 at the 2021 census.

Most of Kilsyth is located within the Shire of Yarra Ranges, the rest is within the City of Maroondah.

== History ==
The town was originally named after Kilsyth in Scotland. The suburb lies predominantly on cleared land which was originally used for orchards.

The Post Office opened on 22 November 1900. The first school opened in April 1910, and is now known as Kilsyth Primary School.

== Retail and industrial ==
There are two main shopping precincts in Kilsyth, Churinga Shopping Centre and Kilsyth Shopping Centre. Smaller shopping strips are located on Colchester Road, Collins Place, and Hawthory Road.

Kilsyth comprises a significant industrial area on Canterbury Road, stretching from Liverpool Road to Dorset Road.

== Education ==
Kilsyth has four primary schools:

- Kilsyth Primary School
- Ghilgai School
- Gladesville Primary School
- St Richard's Primary School

== Sport and community facilities ==
The Elizabeth Bridge Reserve on Durham Road provides a playground, lake, and community centre. There are various other parks and reserves throughout the suburb.

Kilsyth is home to a range of sporting teams and facilities:

- Kilsyth Cobras representative basketball club
- Kilsyth Redbacks cricket club, competing in the Ringwood and District Cricket Association
- Lilydale Swimming Club, which trains at the Kilsyth Centenary Pool on Hawthory Road
- Kilsyth Cougars Australian Football team, competing in the Eastern Football League
- Eastwood Golf Club on Liverpool Road
- Mountain District Badminton Association at the Kilsyth Sports Center on Liverpool Road Kilsyth

== See also ==
- City of Croydon – Parts of Kilsyth were previously within this former local government area.
- Shire of Lillydale – Parts of Kilsyth were previously within this former local government area.
