= Ringwood East =

- Suburb
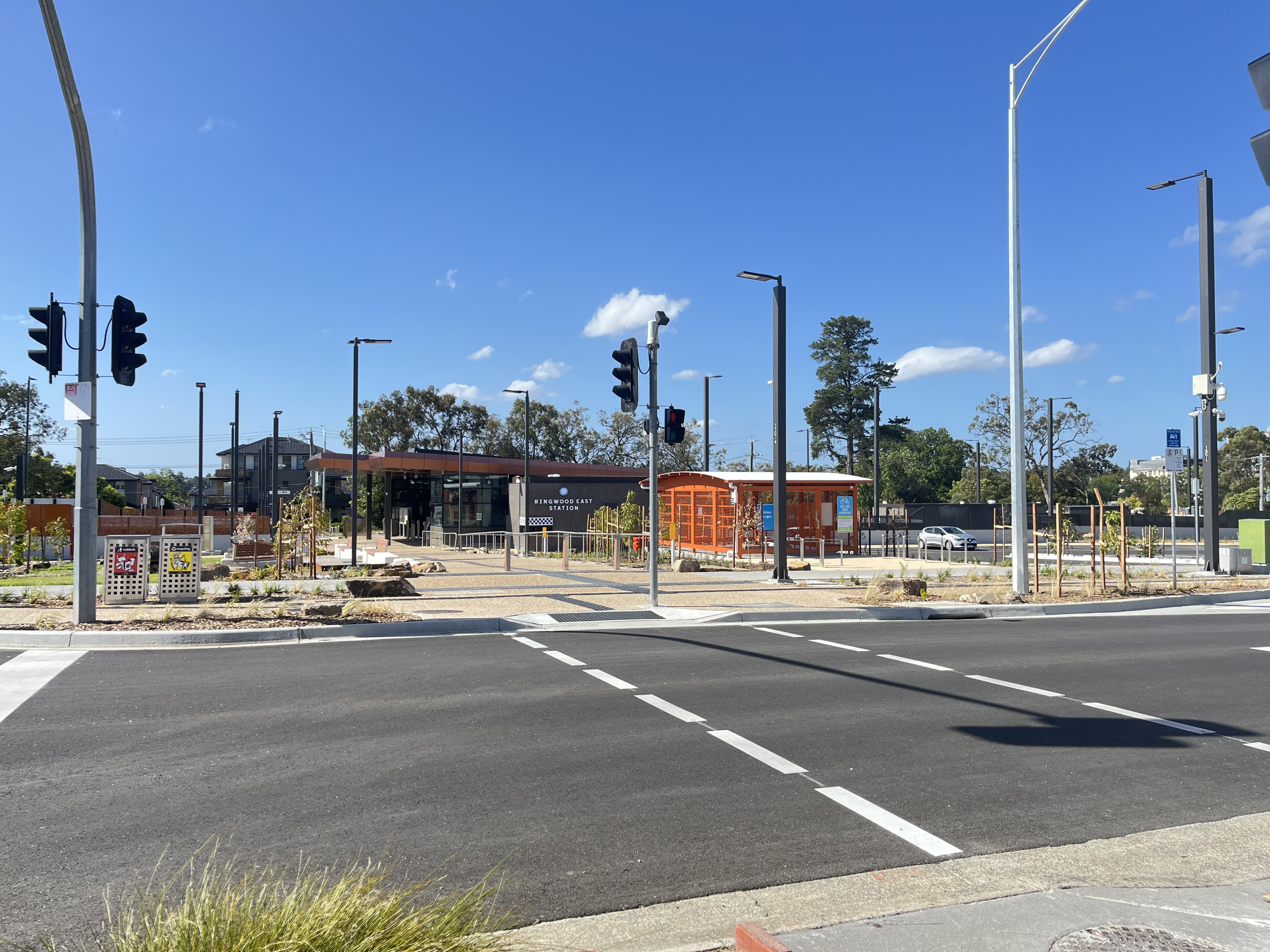

- Interactive map of Ringwood East
- Coordinates: 37.818°S 145.252°E
- Country: Australia
- State: Victoria
- Region: Greater Melbourne
- City: Melbourne
- LGA: City of Maroondah
- Location: 21 km (13 mi) E of Melbourne CBD (Central Melbourne)

Government
  - State electorate: Ringwood
  - Federal division: Deakin

Area
  - Total: 4.7 km^{2} (1.8 sq mi)
- Elevation: 132 m (433 ft)

Population
  - Total: 10,764 (2021 census)
  - Density: 2,290/km^{2} (5,930/sq mi)
- Postcode: 3135
- County: Mornington
Suburbs around Ringwood East
| Ringwood | Ringwood | Croydon |
| Ringwood | Ringwood East | Croydon South |
| Heathmont | Heathmont | Bayswater North |

Ringwood East is a suburb of Melbourne, Victoria, Australia, 21 kilometres (13 mi) east of Melbourne's Central Business District, located within the City of Maroondah local government area. The suburb recorded a population of 10,764 at the 2021 census.

Ringwood East lies within Melbourne's green belt, with native vegetation and wildlife preserved in areas such as Wombalono Park and surrounding streets.

Schools in the suburb include Ringwood Secondary College, Tintern Grammar, and Aquinas College.

Ringwood East railway station, on the Lilydale line, is within the Myki Zone 2 fare zone. Maroondah Hospital is also located in the suburb.

== Facilities ==
=== Maroondah Hospital ===
A public teaching hospital under Eastern Health, offering emergency care, general and specialist medical services, surgery, critical care, and adult mental health support.

=== Australian Army barracks ===
The barracks at 56 Dublin Rd, Ringwood East houses an Australian Army Reserve unit.

In April 2013, the Minister for Defence and the Parliamentary Secretary for Defence visited the Ringwood Army Reserve base.

The 31st Army Cadet Unit, based in Ringwood East, provides cadets with training in military skills.

=== Sporting clubs ===
==== East Ringwood Roos ====
The suburb has an Australian Rules football team, the East Ringwood Roos, competing in the Eastern Football League.

They are based at the reserve located on the corner of Mount Dandenong Road and Dublin Road.

=== Education ===
- Tintern Grammar

== See also ==
- City of Ringwood – Ringwood East was previously within this former local government area.
- Ringwood East railway station – railway station on the Lilydale line
- Maroondah City Council – the local government area of Ringwood East
