= Croydon North, Victoria =

Croydon North
- Suburb
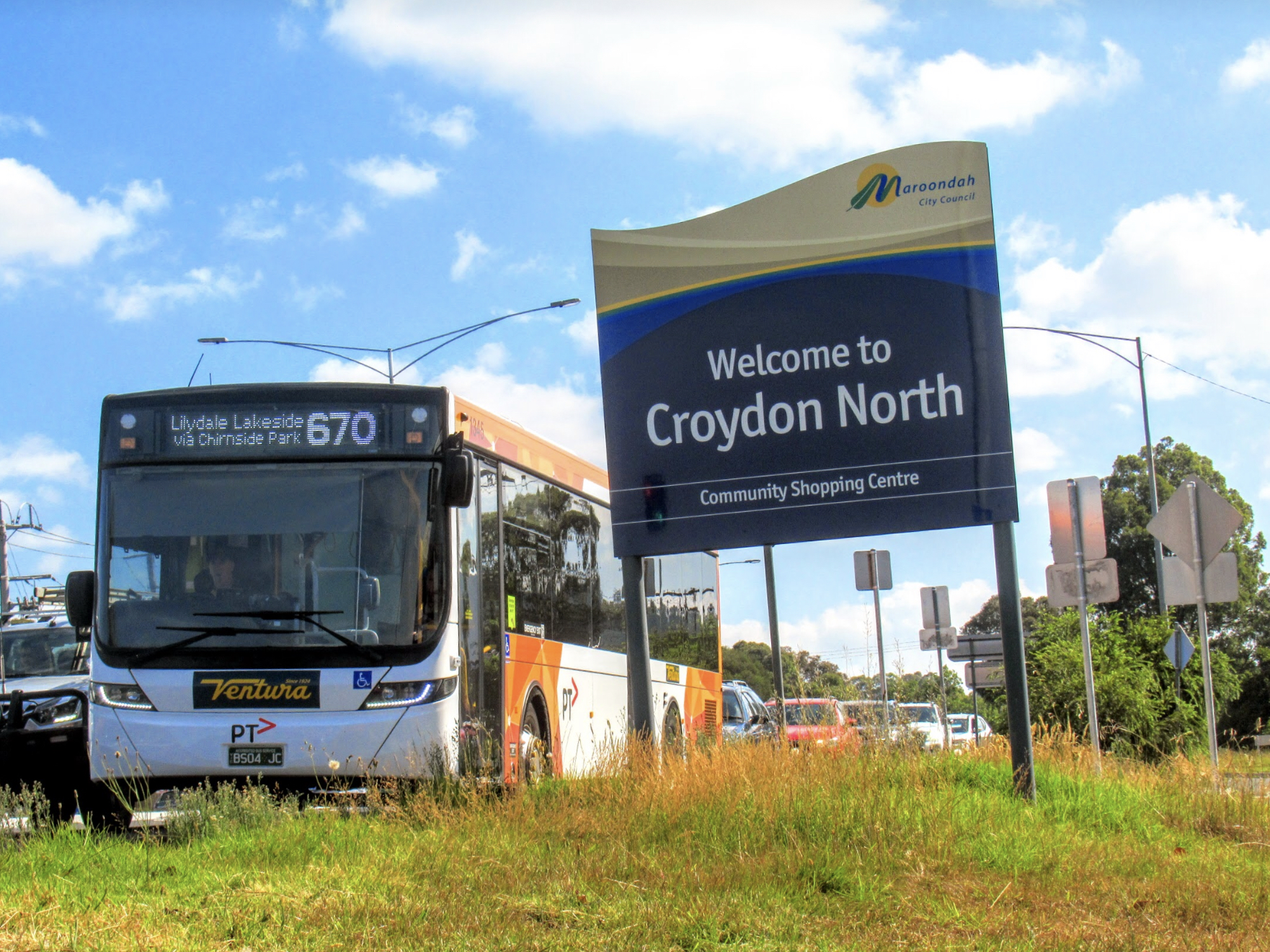
- 670 bus in Croydon North

- Interactive map of Croydon North
- Coordinates: 37.774°S 145.286°E
- Country: Australia
- State: Victoria
- City: Melbourne
- LGA: City of Maroondah
- Location: 31 km (19 mi) E of Melbourne CBD (Central Melbourne)

Government
  - State electorate: Croydon
  - Federal division: Deakin

Area
  - Total: 4 km^{2} (1.5 sq mi)
- Elevation: 120 m (390 ft)

Population
  - Total: 8,092 (2021 census)
  - Density: 2,020/km^{2} (5,200/sq mi)
- Postcode: 3136
- County: Evelyn
Suburbs around Croydon North
Wonga Park	Wonga Park	Chirnside Park
Croydon Hills	Croydon North	Mooroolbark
Croydon Hills	Croydon	Croydon

Croydon North is a suburb of Melbourne, Victoria, Australia, 31 kilometres (19 mi) east of Melbourne's Central Business District, located within the City of Maroondah local government area. Croydon North recorded a population of 8,092 at the 2021 census.

Croydon has 3 major shopping strips, two on either side of Maroondah Highway (continuing shortly down Dorset and Exeter roads) and the other on Exeter Road just next to Kinta Ct.

Croydon North is within the City of Maroondah and is in the Barngeong ward (effective 24 August 2020) which is currently represented by Independent Chris Jones. The area is served by both the MFB and CFA. The suburb is home to many parks, paths and reserves and has a great recreational walking and cycling culture.

== History ==
Croydon North began as a small settlement on the Brushy Creek and the area was aptly named Brushy Creek. A hotel was built near the creek in 1855 and another was built ten years later a few kilometres north. In 1878 a school was built in the area, a church, and post office soon followed. The area was served by Cobb and Co coach which ran from Kew.

The Post Office opened on 1 November 1925 in the then rural area. Today it runs only as a newsagent.

In 1927 Dame Nellie Melba opened the Croydon North Hall, which is now a sewing school (on Exeter Road). It was made of strong Australian timber, something Dame Nellie Melba was very proud of.

The area was primarily developed in the 1960s-1980s but has also seen recent development in the form of property subdivisions.

== Public Transport ==
Croydon North is served by Ventura Bus Services, linking residents to Croydon, Ringwood, Chirnside Park, Lilydale. & Knox. Croydon North also has a V/line Stop along the Melbourne to Mansfield coach service. - The stop is located at the Maroondah Hwy/ Exeter Road Bus Stop and is simply named 'Croydon'. The 684 passes through but does not stop. All other public buses run between Croydon Station and Chirnside Park Shopping Centre. The area is also Served by night services on Route 670 operating Friday and Saturday nights.

Routes:

- 671 Croydon to Chirnside via Croydon North
- 670 Lilydale To Ringwood via Croydon and Chirnside
- 664 Chirnside to Knox SC
- V/Line Service: Southern Cross to Mansfield via Croydon

== Education ==
Croydon North has 2 schools, both of which are for primary education.

These are:

- Yarra Road Primary School, established in 1925 for the then growing population west of central Croydon North
- Village School, A school built on 8 acres and set up to "provide an alternative learning experience"

Croydon North also has 3 Kindergartens. These are:

- Barngeong Reserve Kindergarten
- Croydon North Kindergarten
- Milestone Child Care and Kindergarten

== See also ==
- City of Croydon – Croydon North was previously within this former local government area.
- City of Maroondah – The current local government area.
