= Maroondah Hospital =

Hospital in Ringwood East, Victoria, Australia

- Eastern Health
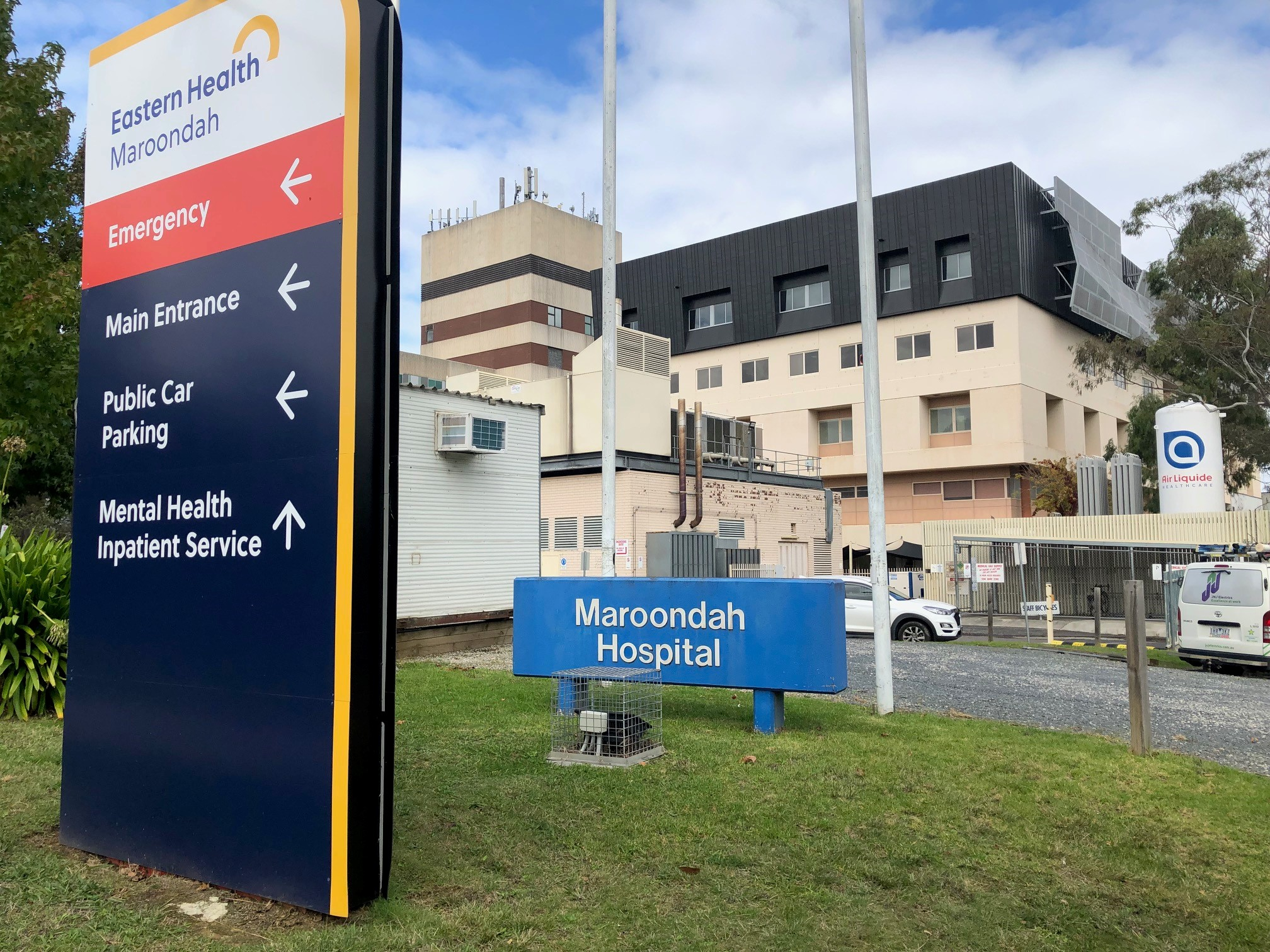
- Maroondah Hospital from Mount Dandenong Road

Geography
- Location: 1-15 Davey Drive, Ringwood East, Victoria, Australia
- Coordinates: 37°48′24″S 145°15′19″E

Organisation
- Care system: Medicare
- Type: General, teaching, specialist
- Affiliated university: Monash University

Services
- Emergency department: Yes
- Beds: 326
- Helipad: No

History
- Opened: 3 July 1976; 49 years ago

Links
- Website: www.easternhealth.org.au/locations/maroondah-hospital

Maroondah Hospital is a public hospital located in the Melbourne suburb of Ringwood East, Victoria, Australia. Affiliated with Deakin University the hospital provides clinical rotations for students enrolled in years 3 and 4 of the medical student programs, focusing on children's health.

The hospital provides secondary acute care, and acute adult mental health services along with an emergency department which is open 24 hours, 7 days a week.

Services include emergency medicine, general and specialist medicine, general and specialist surgery, critical care services, ambulatory and allied health services.

The hospital is a major provider of specialist adult mental health services and provides community adult mental health services throughout Melbourne’s outer-east.

== History ==
Maroondah Hospital has played an integral part in the healthcare of local residents in Melbourne’s east since it was opened by Victorian Governor Sir Henry Winneke on July 3, 1976.

The idea for a public hospital in the region came about at a public meeting at Ringwood Town Hall in April 1964, with building commencing February 1973.

Since then, Maroondah Hospital has continued to grow.

Maroondah hospital celebrated its 40th anniversary on Wednesday 16 November 2016 with a special event.

In 2022, the hospital was in the middle of a Victorian election battle between the Labor and Liberal parties, both parties promising to provide substantial funding for redevelopments and expansion works. As part of the Labor proposal the hospital would be renamed from the Indigenous Australian name Maroondah Hospital to Queen Elizabeth II Hospital, this has been widely criticised by the Victoria’s First Peoples’ Assembly.

== Services ==
Maroondah hospital provides the following services:

- Aged care assessment
- Anaesthesiology – pain medicine
- Community health care
- Dietetics
- Drug and/or alcohol information/referral
- Emergency medical
- Geriatric medicine
- Hospital services
- Library
- Mental health information/referral
- Neurology
- Nursing
- Occupational Therapy
- Paediatric medicine
- Pathology – general
- Pharmacy
- Physiotherapy
- Reproductive endocrinology and infertility
- Speech pathology/therapy

== See also ==
- List of hospitals in Australia
- Healthcare in Australia
