= Croydon, Victoria =

Croydon
- Suburb
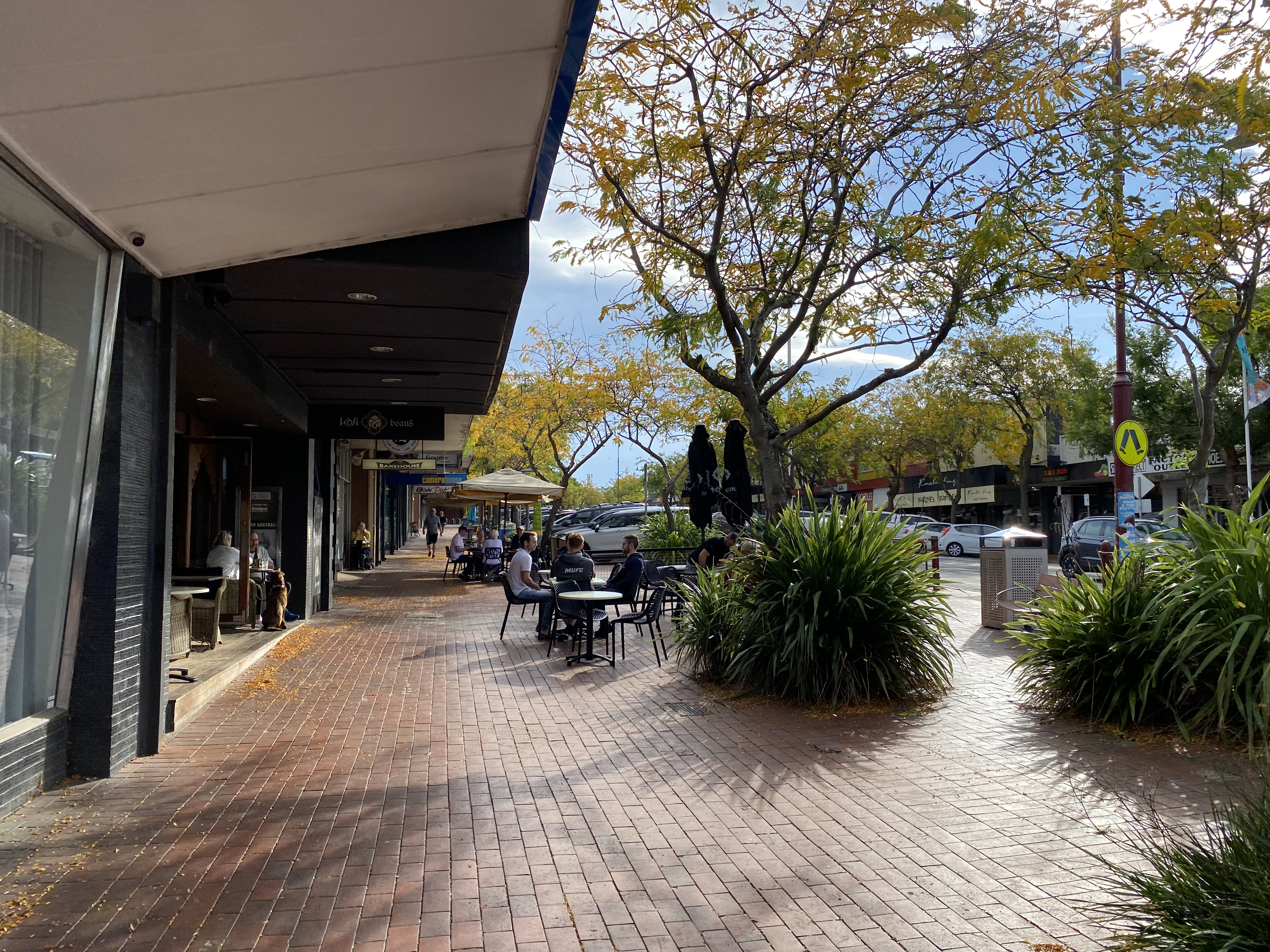
- Croydon Main Street

- Interactive map of Croydon
- Coordinates: 37.791°S 145.282°E
- Country: Australia
- State: Victoria
- Region: Greater Melbourne
- City: Melbourne
- LGA: City of Maroondah
- Location: 30 km (19 mi) E of Melbourne CBD (Central Melbourne)

Government
  - State electorate: Croydon
  - Federal division: Deakin

Area
  - Total: 14.1 km^{2} (5.4 sq mi)
- Elevation: 124 m (407 ft)

Population
  - Total: 28,608 (2021 census)
  - Density: 2,029/km^{2} (5,255/sq mi)
- Postcode: 3136
- County: Evelyn
Suburbs around Croydon
Croydon Hills	Croydon North	Mooroolbark
Ringwood	Croydon	Mooroolbark
Ringwood East	Croydon South	Kilsyth

Croydon is an eastern suburb of Melbourne, Victoria, Australia, 30 kilometres (19 mi) east of Melbourne's Central Business District, located within the City of Maroondah local government area. Croydon recorded a population of 28,608 at the 2021 census.

== History ==
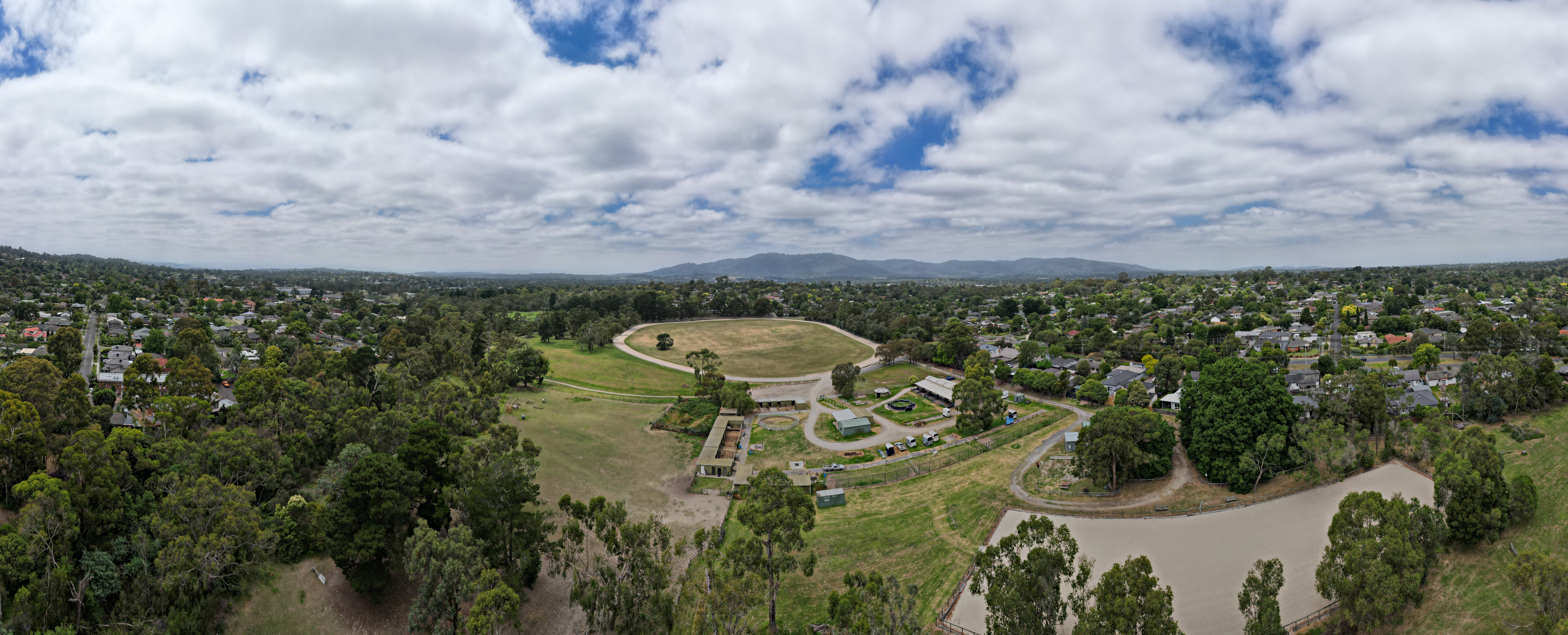
Croydon Hills Light Harness Club and Mount Dandenong on the horizon. Shot Jan 2023.

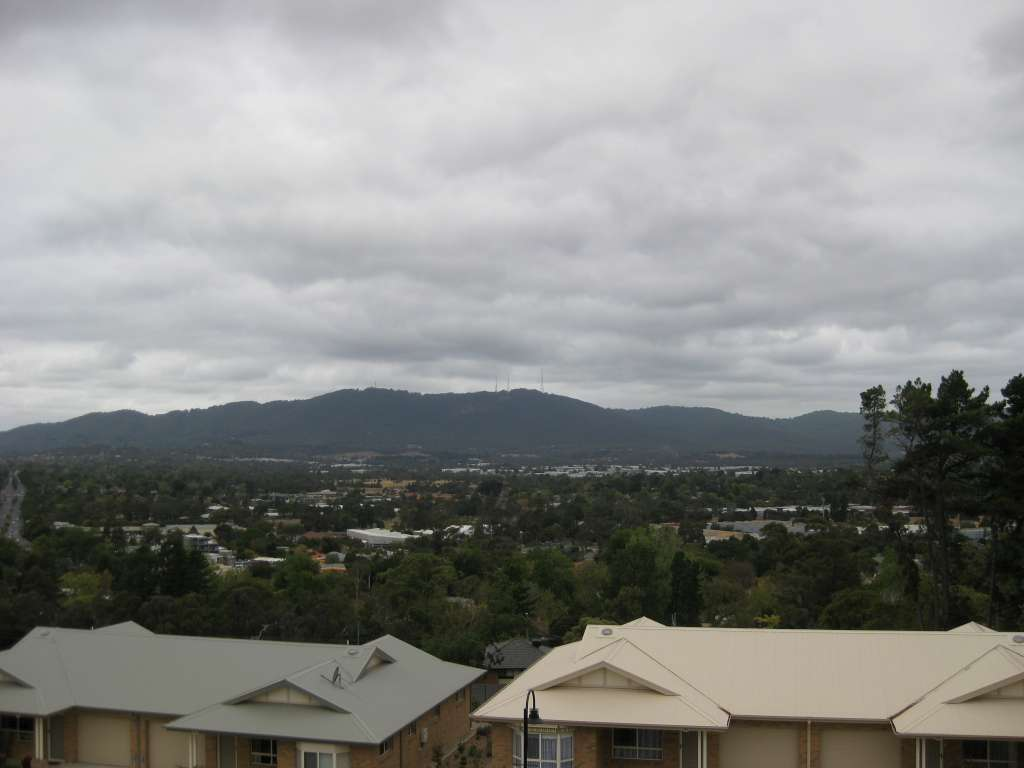
View of Croydon and Mount Dandenong

Dating back to 1840 the land was first utilised by settlers for grazing and the first road cut through the area now known as Croydon, was initially known as Sawmill Road, as a sawmill was nearby. Later it became known as Oxford Road and later Mt Dandenong Road, some time in the early 1900s.

Owing to the coarse silvery-white grass, the area now known as Croydon was first called "White Flats". The Lacey family from Essex, England named the area Croydon after Mrs Lacey's home town. They preferred this to Mr Lacey's home town, Steeple Bumpstead. The Lacey family has a street named after them near the Main St. shopping precinct.

In 1868, parcels of land were surveyed and the first habitations were constructed with wattle and daub. These were later rebuilt in timber and the area prospered in sheep, beef and dairy farming, and sawmills. Orchards were soon established and thrived. Crops included apples, cherries, pears, peaches and plums. Street names in and around Croydon now reflect the impact orchards had on "White Flats".

In 1874, Cobb & Co. ran horses and carts to the area, also known as Brushy Creek.

In 1882, a single rail track was constructed through to Lilydale. When opened on 1 December 1882 the station was called Warrandyte. Travellers would travel by rail to "Warrandyte" station and were then faced with a horse and coach ride to Warrandyte, some 10 km north, which was not well received by the vast majority of travellers, believing the Yarra River was close by. On 1 August 1884 it was renamed Croydon railway station.

From the mid-1880s Croydon started to develop and Mr James Hewish built his home and several other business ventures, including a general store, news agency, butchers shop and hotel, and planted various orchard trees. The Post Office opened on 1 December 1883 after the railway line was established. Nelson's Hill Post Office opened nearby in 1902 and was renamed Burnt Bridge in 1979.

In 1908, Croydon Hall was built on Mt Dandenong Road. It is now home to EV's Entertainment Centre.

In 1912 Croydon was proclaimed and gazetted as a town.

In 1925 the Croydon section of the Lilydale railway line was electrified, with electrification arriving at Lilydale a month later. Croydon railway station was rebuilt in the 1980s. As part of its increasing passenger traffic the bus station/interchange was revamped in the early 2000s and is used by Ventura Bus Lines services.

In the early 1920s a Monday market began. The market included live animals, chickens, birds and other small animals. It was a noted landmark and meeting place for locals from neighbouring suburbs until the site was redeveloped in the 1980s. It closed down in 2012.

Originally Croydon was part of the Shire of Lillydale. In 1957 a request was submitted for Croydon to leave the Shire of Lillydale and become its own entity. The City of Croydon was incorporated in May 1961 and was proclaimed a City in 1971. It was merged, along with the City of Ringwood, into the City of Maroondah in 1994.

The Burntbridge Shopping Centre opened in the late 1960s and was one of Croydon's first American-style retail complexes. It was developed by the Masaga Group.

== Croydon today ==
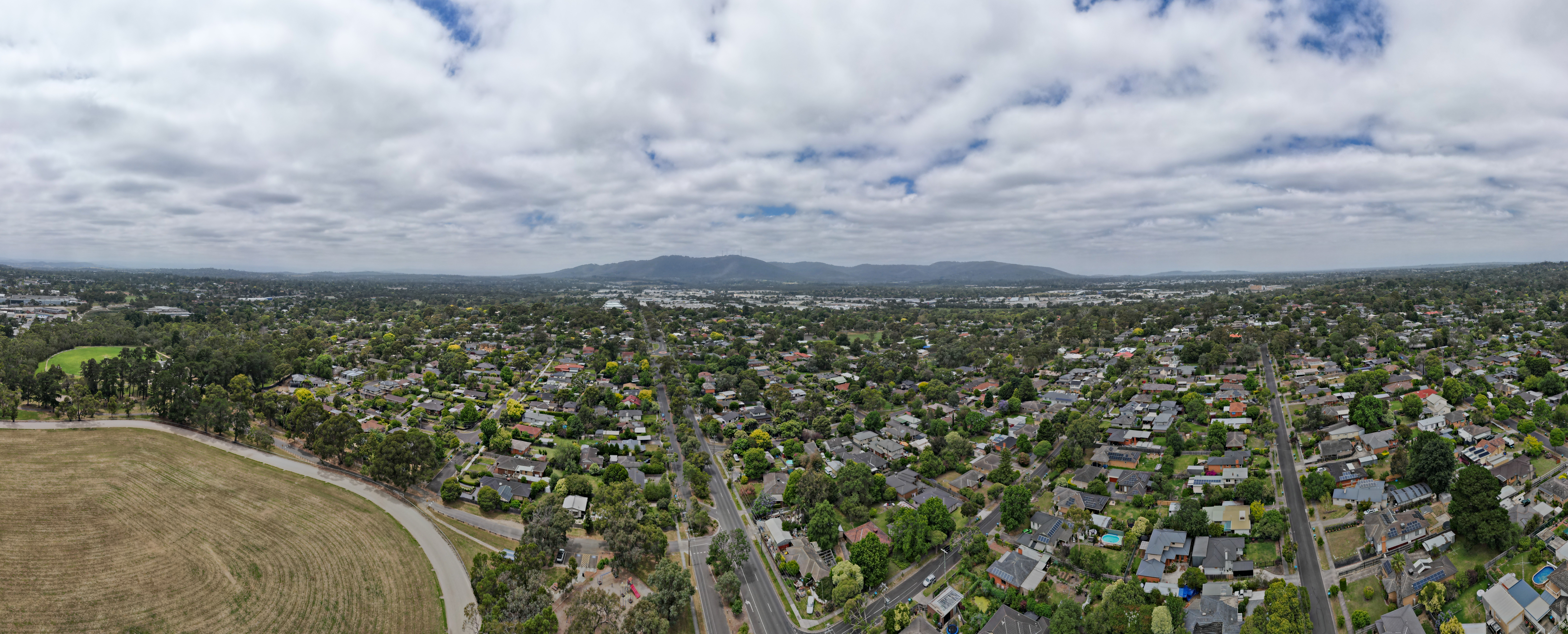
Aerial panorama of Mount Dandenong with Croydon in the foreground. Shot January 2023.

The Main Street of Croydon currently has over 187 traders, including eateries, clothing, music, toys, hairdressers and many others.

Croydon Central is a strong-performing food and services-based neighbourhood centre located 28km east of the Melbourne CBD in Croydon. The centre is situated in a high-profile location in Croydon, on the corner of Kent and Wicklow Avenue, and is well-served by the Croydon train station and bus terminal. There is easy car access to Melbourne CBD via the M3.

Croydon is also served by the Civic Square Shopping Centre on Mt Dandenong Road, opposite Croydon Park, which has in excess of 20 retail outlets. It has an area of 44,980 sqm and 738 parking spots.

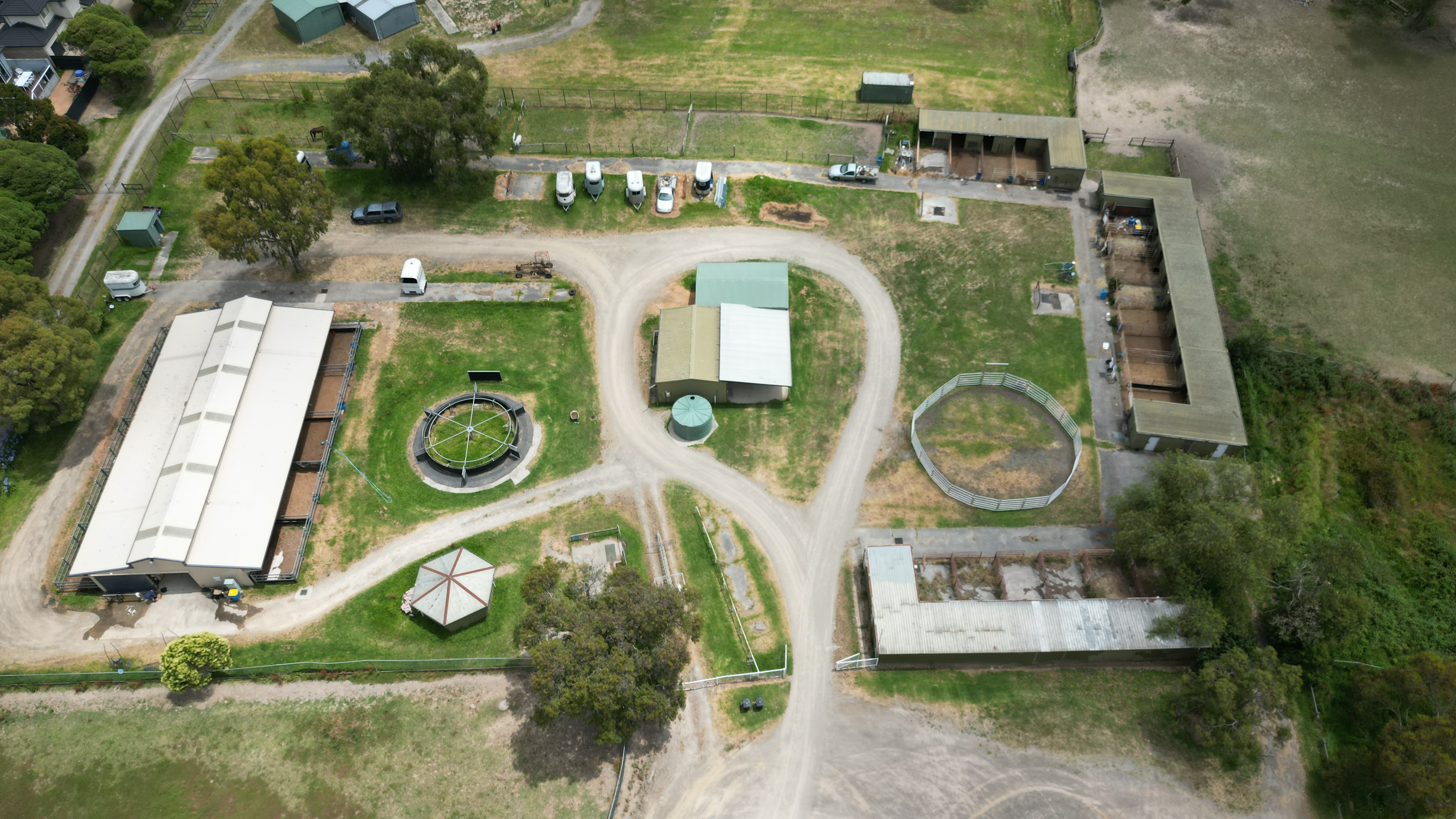
Croydon Light Harness Club from above. January 2023.

During the late 1990s and early 2000s onwards, Croydon's housing density and type changed and increased with the advent of 'dual occupancy'. Many former large single-dwelling blocks were sold and redeveloped.

The Croydon area is served by a weekly newspaper, the Maroondah Leader.

Croydon has many churches in the area, including Catholic, Baptist, Uniting, Presbyterian, Seventh-Day Adventist and Pentecostal.

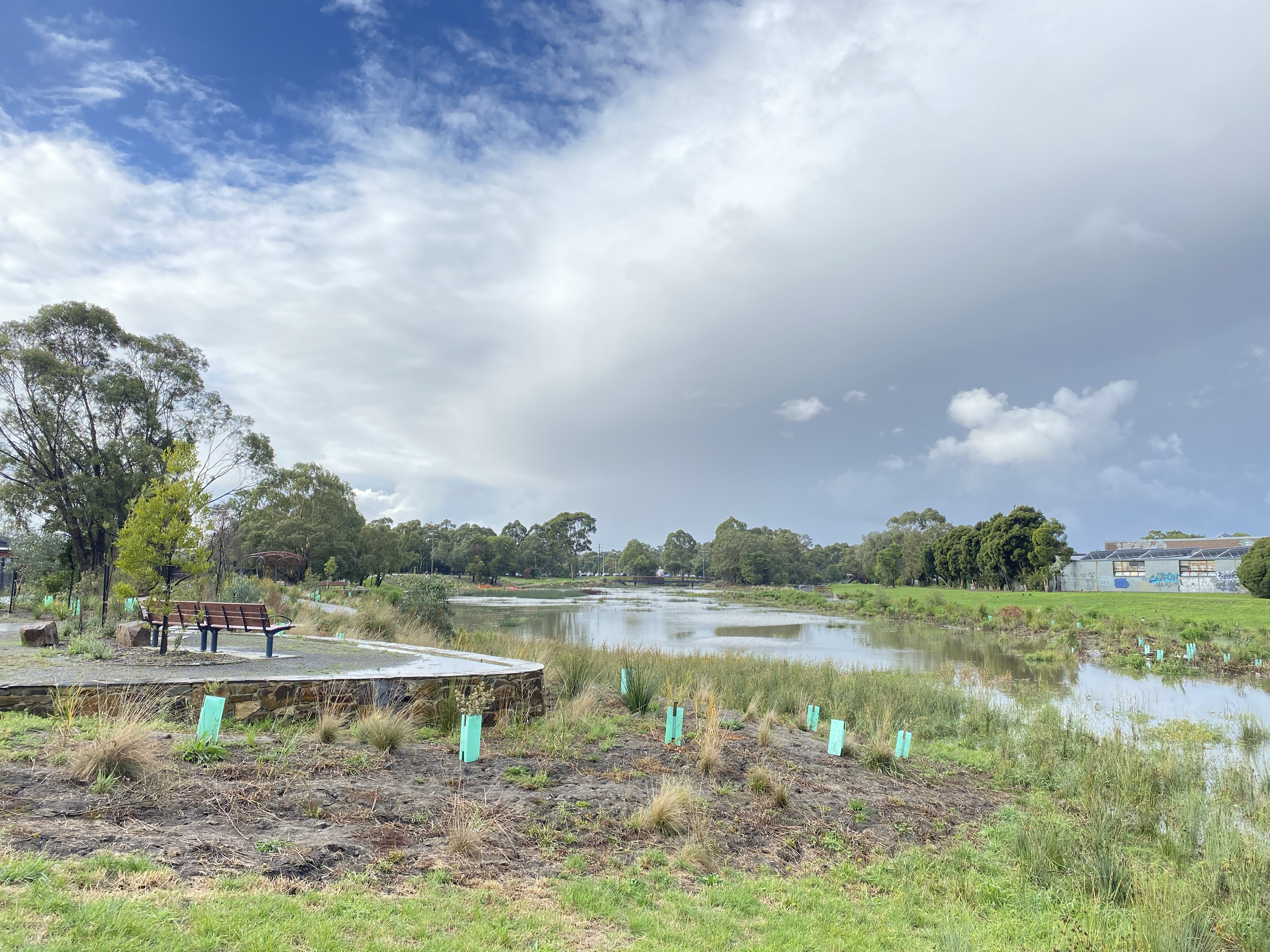
Taralla Wetlands

== Political representation in Croydon ==
In 2008, the Victorian Electoral Commission conducted an Electoral Representation Review. This resulted in the existing seven wards being amalgamated into three. Retaining three names, each new ward has three Councillors. The new wards are as follows:

- Arrabri (South – East of the City of Maroondah)
- Wyreena (North – North East of the City of Maroondah)
- Mullum (Central – Western of the City of Maroondah)

Croydon is represented by two State Electoral Districts; Croydon and Warrandyte. From the Federal perspective, Croydon sits across two Electoral Divisions; Casey and Deakin.

== Leisure and lifestyle ==
In 2007, the City of Maroondah built additional leisure facilities in Croydon, in addition to the existing Croydon gymnasium facility in Civic Square. Called Aquahub, it opened in August, 2008.

Croydon Memorial is located on Springfield Avenue. An outdoor pool venue, open each November – March, it also holds VICSWIM classes during school holidays. There has been considerable debate as to the 'viability' of the pool from Council. Petitions were signed and meetings held to try to keep the pool open. In 2007, Council agreed to keep the pool open.

Wyreena Community Arts Centre is located on Hull Road, just east of Dorset Road. It is home to varied artistic and lifestyle activities. It is the location of 3ECB, Radio Eastern FM 98.1 community radio station.

The Croydon library is located on Civic Drive. As a member of the Eastern Regional Libraries, it hosts a range of events for all ages, including author talks and children's events.

=== Maroondah Festival ===
The Maroondah Festival is held each year in the Croydon Park and embraced by the City of Maroondah and residents from surrounding suburbs. Performers have included: Daryl Braithwaite, Kate Ceberano, Vanessa Amorosi, Paul Kelly, Johnny Diesel, Hunters and Collectors, The Living End, 28 Days, Bodyjar, Frenzal Rhomb, Spiderbait, Kisschasy and even a few international acts, including Sonia Dada.

=== Youth services ===
EV's Youth Centre opened in 1989 and is run by Maroondah Youth Services, for young people aged between 12 and 25 yrs. The team cover a wide range of activities and information services for young people to access, including INFO-HQ each Wednesday afternoon and Drop-In on Friday afternoons (Drop-In is open except during school holidays).

There is also the Maroondah FReeZA Group, a long-standing local venue for all-ages. They provide live music events with both all age and under-age, fully supervised D&D, free dance parties and live gigs.

In the 1990s, EV's Youth Centre hosted shows by acts like Fear Factory, Regurgitator, Something for Kate and Fugazi.

== Sport ==
Croydon City Arrows Soccer Club was established in 1957 and plays its home games at Dorset Recreational Reserve. The club has been Victorian champions twice, in both 1985 and 1986, and plays in Provisional League 1 South-East. Notable players include former Australian internationals Danny Allsopp, Paul Wade and Peter Ollerton.

Croydon Ranges Football club has been the main tenant at Silcock Reserve since 1999 after an amalgamation with another local club in 1998. Croydon Ranges has teams participating in Football Victoria, Victorian Churches Football Association, Bayside Football Association and Over45Soccer Melbourne and is the only club in the area to field teams in all age groups, days, genders and abilities.

Recent successes include 2022 Bayside FA Premier League & U12C League / Regional Championship in Football Victoria.

Maroondah United Football Club is based at Silcock Reserve in Croydon and was established in 2018.

The Croydon Cricket Club, established in 1886, plays at Croydon Park Oval. It participates in the Victorian Sub-District Cricket Association, the state's second highest level of cricket. It also has several Junior sides competing in the Ringwood and District Cricket Association, with U12, U14, U16, U18 and non comps for U10s. Croydon also has two veterans sides competing in Masters (over 40s) and Legends (over 50's).

The Croydon Tennis Club was established in 1907 and is one of Victoria's oldest clubs, servicing the eastern suburbs community of Croydon and surrounding areas. In recent years the club has facilitated the installation of water saving technologies, for which it received an award, as well as securing a Council grant for up-to-date night lighting.

Croydon Football Club also plays at Croydon Park Oval. They were formed in 1906 and are nicknamed "The Blues", wearing a navy blue strip similar to the Carlton Football Club. Croydon FC is a member of the Eastern Football League. In season 1998 it returned to play in Division One. In season 2009 The Blues finished on top of Division One, with 60 Points, equal to Balwyn. Their reserve side also finished on top of the ladder in 2009 and both sides played in the grand final, with the sides losing to Vermont and Knox respectively. Season 2012 saw Croydon finish on the bottom of the ladder and they were relegated to Division Two. In 2018, the teams' Reserves team won the premiership in Division 2.

The Croydon Golf Club, once located on the picturesque Dorset Road site, was sold to a housing development consortium in late 2006. After much legal argument and petition, the land was zoned residential in accordance with Government legislation. The golf club has since relocated to a site in Yering. Local golfers can still play at the Dorset Golf Course, on Trawalla Road.

Croydon also has an athletics club, which was established in 2007. It is a small club, with 47 members in the 2008–09 season.

== Education ==
=== Primary schools ===
- Ainslie Parklands Primary School (formerly Croydon West Primary School)
- Croydon Primary School
- Dorset Primary School
- Ruskin Park Primary School
- Sacred Heart Primary School
- Yarra Road Primary School

=== Secondary schools ===
- Croydon Community School
- Croydon Special Development School
- Melba College (merger of Croydon and Maroondah secondary colleges)

=== Further education ===
- Swinburne University of Technology (campus in Norton Road, Croydon)

== Public transport ==
Croydon railway station is on the Lilydale railway line and is in Public Transport Victoria ticketing Zone 2. The station has ramp access on the Main Street side, or City side and is less than a five-minute walk from Main Street.

As of March 2024, the station is closed and works in progress to remove the Coolstore Road level crossing as part of the Victoria State Government's Level Crossing Removal Project.

The bus and rail interchange has a number of buses servicing the surrounding suburbs, which can be found on either side of the Croydon railway station:

- 664 Chirnside Park Shopping Centre – Westfield Knox via Bayswater station, Croydon Station (every day). Operated by Ventura Bus Lines.
- 668 Ringwood – Croydon via Croydon Hills (every day). Operated by Kinetic Melbourne.
- 669 Ringwood – Croydon via Ringwood East (every day). Operated by Kinetic Melbourne.
- 670 Lilydale – Ringwood via Croydon Station, Chirnside Park Shopping Centre (every day). Operated by Ventura Bus Lines.
- 671 Croydon – Chirnside Park Shopping Centre (Monday to Saturday). Operated by Ventura Bus Lines.
- 672 Croydon – Chirnside Park Shopping Centre via Wonga Park (Monday to Saturday). Operated by Ventura Bus Lines.
- 688 Croydon – Upper Ferntree Gully via Mount Dandenong, Olinda, Tremont (every day). Operated by Ventura Bus Lines.
- 689 Croydon – Montrose via Kilsyth (Monday to Saturday). Operated by Ventura Bus Lines.
- 690 Croydon – Boronia via Kilsyth, Canterbury Gardens (every day). Operated by Ventura Bus Lines.
- 737 Croydon – Monash University via Boronia, Westfield Knox and Glen Waverley (every day). Operated by Ventura Bus Lines.
- Telebus Area 4 Croydon – Mooroolbark (Monday to Saturday). Operated by Ventura Bus Lines.

== Notable people ==
- 360 (rapper) – attended Luther College, Croydon
- Joshua Allison - wheelchair basketball player
- Ruth Alsop - architect
- Fred Cook - Australian rules footballer
- Keith Cook - Australian rules footballer
- Stanley Goble - Air force commander
- Matthew Haanappel- Paralympic swimmer, attended Melba College
- Kane Johnson – former captain of the Richmond Football Club, attended Croydon Secondary College
- Mark Opitz - record producer
- Rex Ritchie - Australian rules footballer
- Kay Setches - politician
- Brett Stephens - Australian rules footballer
- Brett Sutton - Chief health officer of Victoria
- Magda Szubanski – comedian and actress, grew up in Croydon
- Bob Wallace - athlete
- Tom Wheelwright - politician

== See also ==
- City of Croydon – Croydon was previously within this former local government area.
