= ConnectEast =

Australian company

- Type: Private
- Industry: Transportation
- Founded: 2002
- Headquarters: Ringwood, Victoria, Australia
- Key people: Charles Griplas, Managing Director
- Products: EastLink tollway Part of Ringwood Bypass
- Revenue: $350 million (2019)
- Number of employees: Approx 200 (2014)
- Website: www.connecteast.com.au

ConnectEast is an Australian company responsible for the finance, design, construction and operation of the EastLink toll road in Melbourne.

Previously listed in the Australian Securities Exchange (ASX) as the ConnectEast Group, it won a $2.5 billion tender in 2004 to finance, design, construct, operate and maintain the 39 km EastLink toll road between Mitcham and Frankston, which links the Eastern Freeway in the eastern suburbs of Melbourne to the Frankston Freeway in Melbourne's south-east. This tollway was constructed by a joint venture between Thiess and John Holland and completed five months ahead of schedule with the tollway opening in June 2008.

In late 2011, ConnectEast was sold to Horizon Roads (a consortium of eight investors: Universities Superannuation Scheme from the United Kingdom, APG of the Netherlands, National Pension Service of South Korea, China's Leader Investment Corp, Arbejdsmarkedets Tillægspension of Denmark, Teachers Insurance and Annuity of the US and the Korean Teachers Credit Union) for $2.2 billion and delisted from the ASX.

ConnectEast's concession expires in 2043.
