= Deepdene, Victoria =

Deepdene Melbourne, Victoria
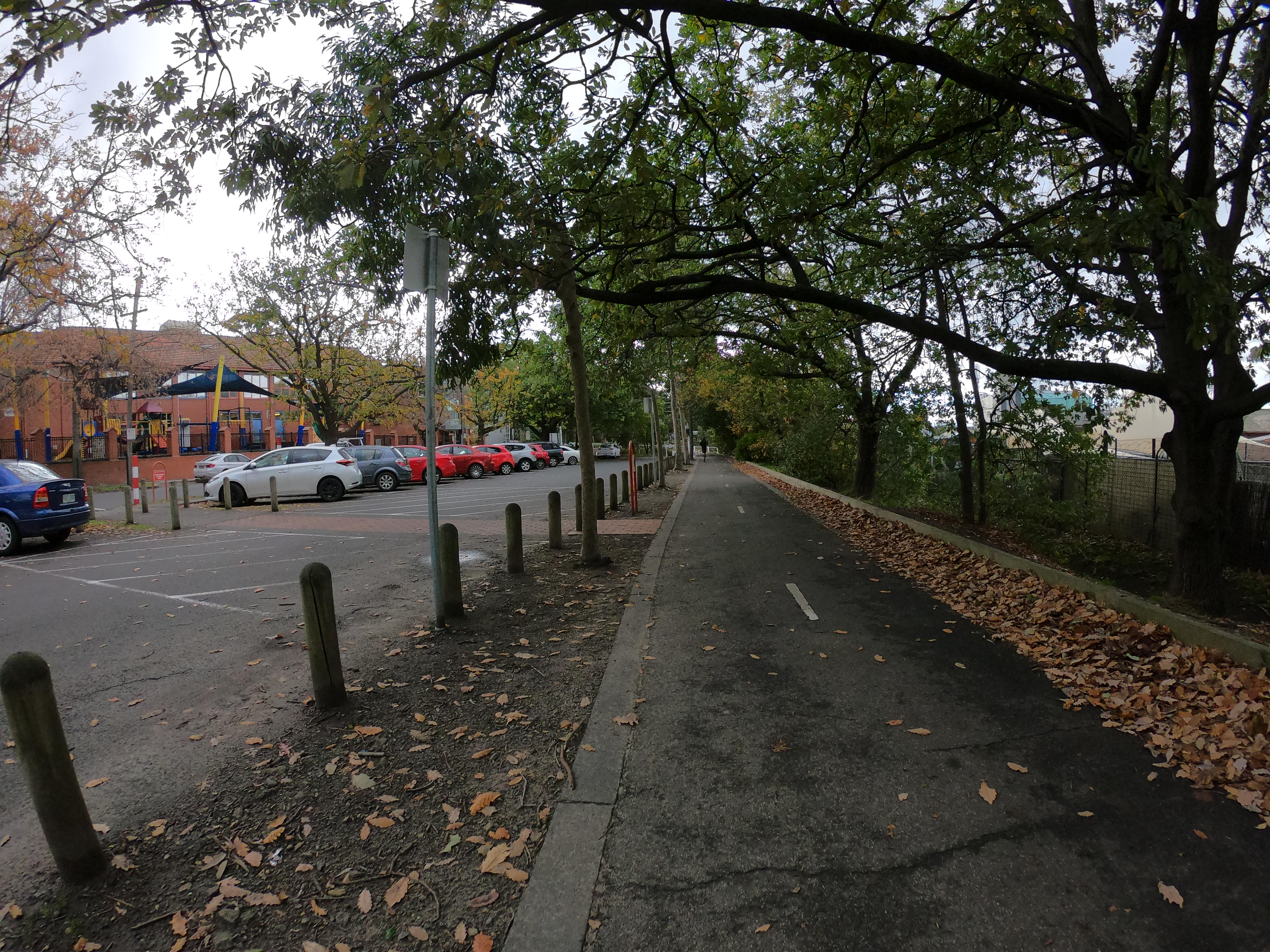
- Outer Circle Trail, Deepdene

- Coordinates: 37°48′47″S 145°4′04″E
- Population: 2,101 (2021 census)
- Established: April 2010
- Postcode(s): 3103
- Location: 9 km (6 mi) from Melbourne
- LGA(s): City of Boroondara
- State electorate(s): Kew
- Federal division(s): Kooyong
Suburbs around Deepdene:
Kew	Balwyn	Balwyn
Kew	Deepdene	Balwyn
Canterbury	Canterbury	Canterbury

Deepdene is a suburb of Melbourne, Victoria, Australia, 9 kilometres (5.6 miles) east from Melbourne's central business district, located within the City of Boroondara local government area. Deepdene recorded a population of 2,101 at the 2021 census.

Formerly a neighbourhood within the suburb of Balwyn, Lachlan Williams, former Councillor for Cotham Ward, took the idea of having Deepdene gazetted as a suburb to the 2004 Boroondara Council Elections. As Councillor he obtained budget approval in 2006 for local consultation on gazetting and boundaries. After a positive community response, Council sought formalisation and the Office of Geographic Names officially gazetted the proposal in the Victoria Government Gazette on 4 December 2008 and recognised Deepdene as a bounded locality in April 2010. A proposal to extend the suburb boundaries east to Balwyn Road and north to Belmore Road was voted down by Boroondara Council in April 2014.

== History ==
Deepdene Post Office, on Whitehorse Road, opened on 14 July 1913.

Deepdene railway station was on the Outer Circle railway line, which opened on 24 March 1891 and closed to the public on 9 October 1927 due to lack of passengers. The train which ran on the line was known by locals as the "Deepdene Dasher". A documentary called Melbourne's Forgotten Railway - The Outer Circle, which details the history of the line, was released in 2014.

The railway has been converted into the Outer Circle Railway Anniversary Trail, a walking and cycling path, which includes informative signs detailing the history of the line.

Shops in the period 1959 to 1966 included Mrs Gebbie's haberdashery, Lanyon's grocery store (Lanyon obtained a liquor licence in this historically dry area), a Kevin Dennis car yard, a classic corner milk bar, a hardware store, a garden landscaping supply business, and a commercial bakery.

== Education ==
- Our Lady of Good Counsel
- Deepdene Primary School
- Bambini Early Learning Centre

== Sport ==
Deepdene Uniting Cricket Club (known as the "Deeners") and Deepdene Bears Cricket Club are both based in Deepdene. The suburb is also home to the Deepdene Tennis Club.
