= Enos Thomas =

Australian rules footballer

Personal information
- Full name: Enos John Thomas
- Born: 28 April 1892; Ringwood, Victoria
- Died: 27 March 1974 (aged 81); Kew, Victoria
- Original team: Ringwood
- Height: 191 cm (6 ft 3 in)

Playing career^{1}
Years	Club	Games (Goals)
1921	Melbourne	2 (1)
1922	Essendon	1 (0)
Total		3 (1)
- ^{1} Playing statistics correct to the end of 1922.

Enos John Thomas (28 April 1892 – 27 March 1974) was an Australian rules footballer who played with Melbourne and Essendon in the Victorian Football League (VFL).
