= EastLink (Melbourne) =

Tollway in Melbourne, Australia

EastLink Victoria

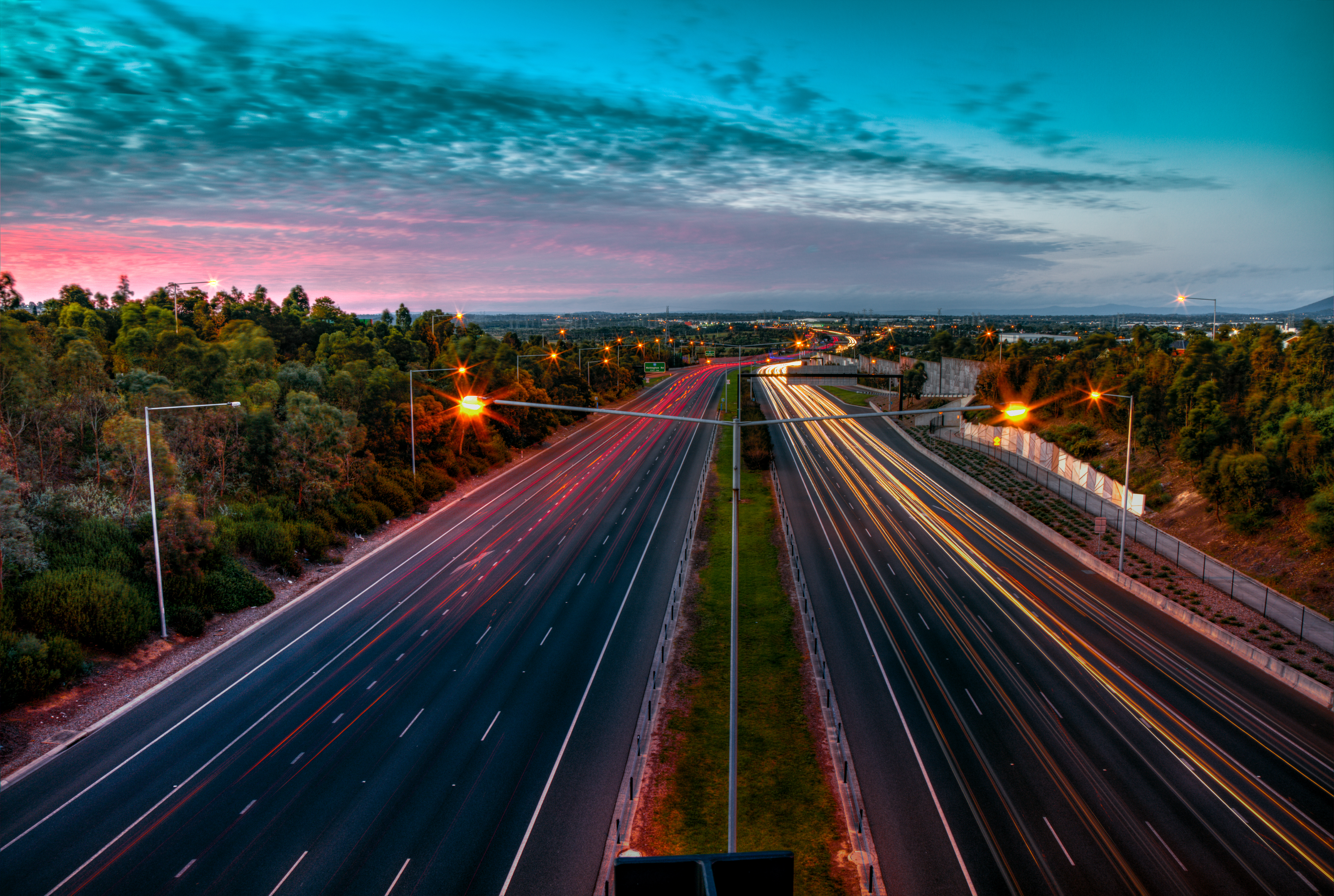
- EastLink in May 2016
- Coordinates: 37.803885°S 145.178026°E (North end); 38.097424°S 145.145176°E (South end)

General information
- Type: Freeway
- Location: Melbourne
- Length: 39 km (24 mi)
- Opened: 29 June 2008
- Maintained by: ConnectEast
- Route number(s): M3 (2008–present)

Major junctions
- North end: Eastern Freeway; Donvale, Melbourne
- Maroondah Highway; Burwood Highway; Monash Freeway; Princes Highway; Mornington Peninsula Freeway
- South end: Frankston Freeway; Seaford, Melbourne

Location(s)
- LGA(s): City of Manningham; City of Maroondah; City of Knox; City of Greater Dandenong; City of Frankston
- Major suburbs / towns: Ringwood, Wantirna, Scoresby, Rowville, Dandenong North, Keysborough, Carrum Downs, Seaford

Highway system
- Highways in Australia; National Highway • Freeways in Australia; Highways in Victoria

EastLink is a tolled section of the M3 freeway linking a large area through the eastern and south-eastern suburbs of Melbourne, Australia.

EastLink is electronically tolled with no cash booths, using a system developed by SICE. The SICE Tolling System is similar to (and interoperable with) the e-TAG system used on the CityLink tollway. EastLink was opened to traffic on Sunday 29 June 2008 and in conjunction with the opening, a month-long toll-free period occurred before regular tolling commenced on 27 July 2008.

The project was constructed by a joint venture of Australian construction companies Thiess Contractors and John Holland, with tolling system contracted to SICE, and mechanical and electrical work contracted to United Group Infrastructure. The final project cost was A$2.5 billion.

Signs at the entrances and on the tollway direct to Ringwood, Dandenong, Frankston and Doncaster.

== History ==
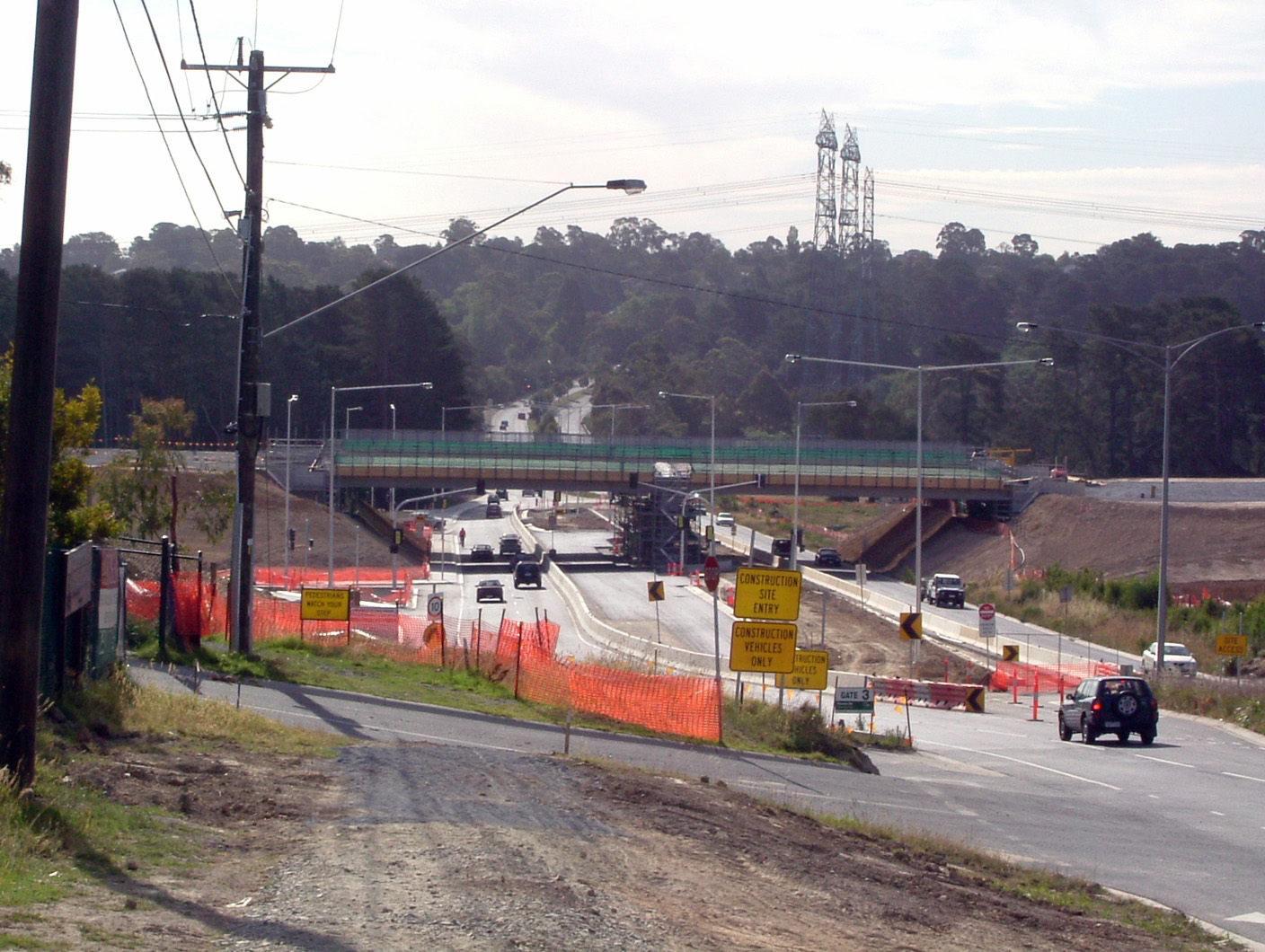
Construction of EastLink over Boronia Road in Wantirna

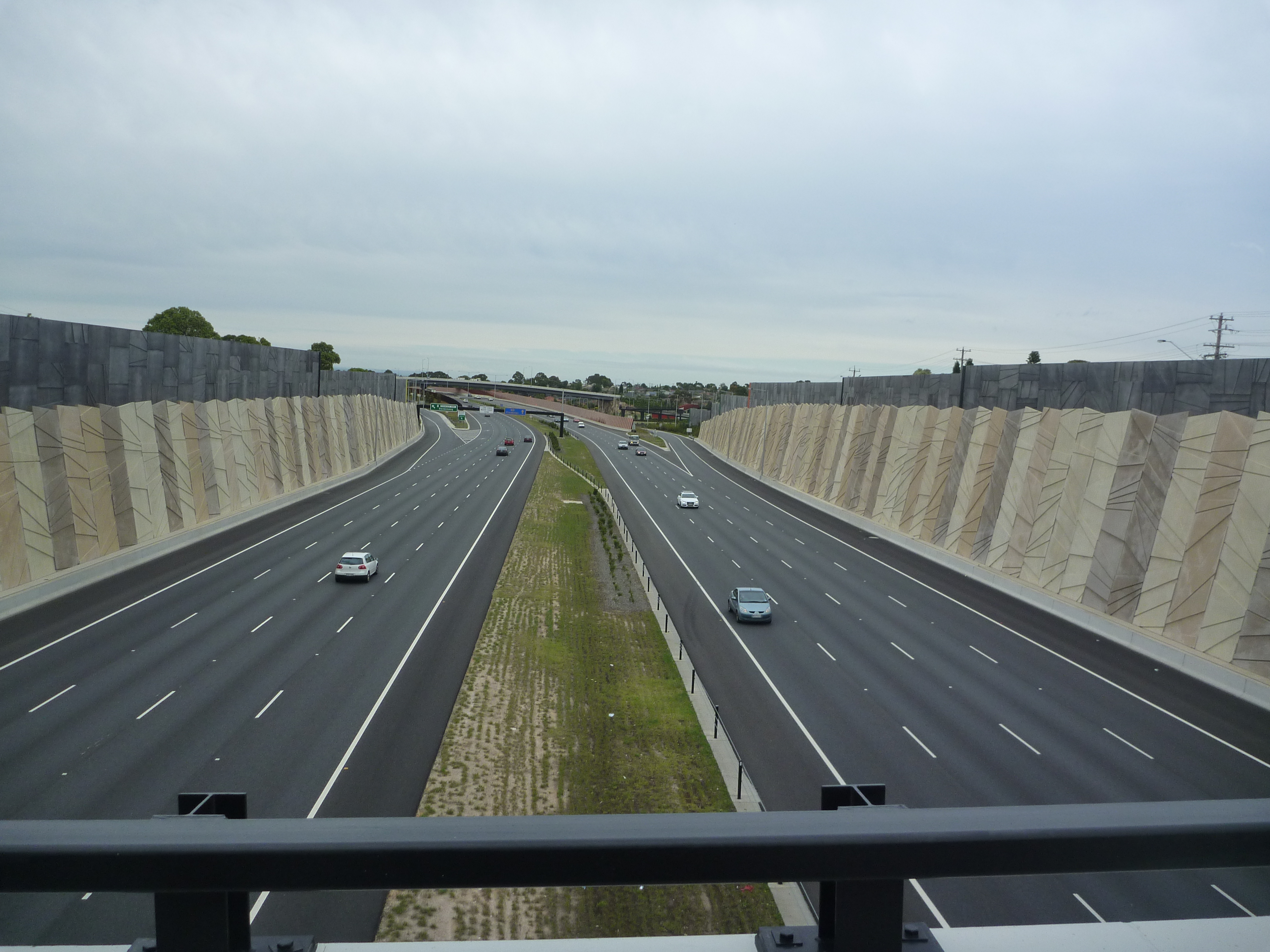
Eastlink in December 2009

The road was originally shown in the 1969 Melbourne Transportation Plan as the F35 Freeway.

The freeway has been a contentious issue, amid concerns over environmental damage and the possibility it would lead to a 'complete' metropolitan ring road. In October 1999, the incoming Bracks Government announced that the freeway (which Labor had not promised at the election) had been scrapped. Instead the government promised to investigate a preferred route for the Rowville railway line and extend tram route 75 to Knox, neither of which have eventuated. However, in a "major policy about-face", the Bracks Government announced in August 2000 that it would seek federal funding for the freeway. To obtain funding, the freeway would need to be classified as a road of "national importance", despite the fact that it did not form part of the national highway system. The "U-turn"' on the freeway was strongly criticised by opponents such as the Public Transport Users Association, because it would result in proposed public transport alternatives, such as the Rowville railway line, being scrapped.

In 2001, University of Melbourne academic Paul Mees launched legal action in the Federal Court seeking an injunction, under section 475 of the Environment Protection and Biodiversity Conservation Act 1999, to prevent Transport Minister Peter Batchelor and the Roads Corporation (VicRoads) from "taking any further action relating to the construction of the Scoresby freeway or the Eastern Ring Road". He alleged that the freeway would threaten migratory birds, plant species and wetlands and that the freeway was part of a larger plan to build a metropolitan ring road to Greensborough. In light of the court case, state government bureaucrats removed references to the metropolitan ring road from a draft Metropolitan Strategy.

In 2003, the Southern and Eastern Integrated Transport Authority (SEITA) was established by the Victorian Government, to manage and oversee the project on behalf of the government. SEITA was responsible for managing the process of selecting a private sector bidder.

In October 2004, SEITA awarded the contract for the design, construction, and operation of EastLink to ConnectEast, a company that was publicly listed on the ASX in November 2004. ConnectEast subsequently contracted Thiess John Holland, a group formed by the partnership of two major construction companies, to carry out the detailed design and construction of EastLink.

ConnectEast, as owner of the road, is responsible for its day-to-day management until the concession deed expires in 2043. EastLink's construction began in March 2005, and the road opened on 29 June 2008.

The opening of the road on 29 June 2008 saw traffic on nearby Stud, Springvale and Blackburn Roads drop by 30% to 40%, but traffic on the Eastern Freeway rose by 5 per cent at the Burke Road intersection, and by about 1–2 per cent at Hoddle Street in the city. On average 270,868 cars, trucks and motorbikes travelled on the road every day until the tolling was introduced on 23 July. In the first week after the introduction of tolls, the average number of daily trips fell to 133,722. This was in line with estimates of a 40 to 50 per cent decline, but is a third below prospectus forecasts. The average toll per trip was $3.10 – above the estimate of $2.91.

In its first six months of operation, Eastlink made a loss of almost $93 million. In 2010, the road had to be refinanced, with its traffic forecasts rewritten due to lower than expected traffic volumes.

The tollway was closed for the first time on 18 February 2010 when a semi-trailer crashed into a large pylon holding up a road sign gantry. The driver had lost control on the north-bound side of the tollway, 300m from the Wellington Rd exit, and was killed in the accident.

=== Naming history ===
Over the years the project was variously referred to as the Eastern Ring Road, Scoresby Freeway, Scoresby Bypass, and Mitcham-Frankston Freeway.

On 23 March 2005, with the beginning of construction on the project, then Premier Steve Bracks announced that the road would be called EastLink, at a ceremony in Rowville. The new name was reportedly chosen because it was easier to say, apparently easier to remember, and would fit on street directories.

On 27 February 2008, it was announced that the EastLink / Monash Freeway interchange would be named the "Tom Wills Interchange", after the founder of Australian rules football Tom Wills. On 24 March 2008, Roads Minister Tim Pallas announced that the twin tunnels would be named "Melba" (named after Dame Nellie Melba) and "Mullum Mullum" (named after the Mullum Mullum Creek), in the inbound and outbound direction respectively.

== Route ==
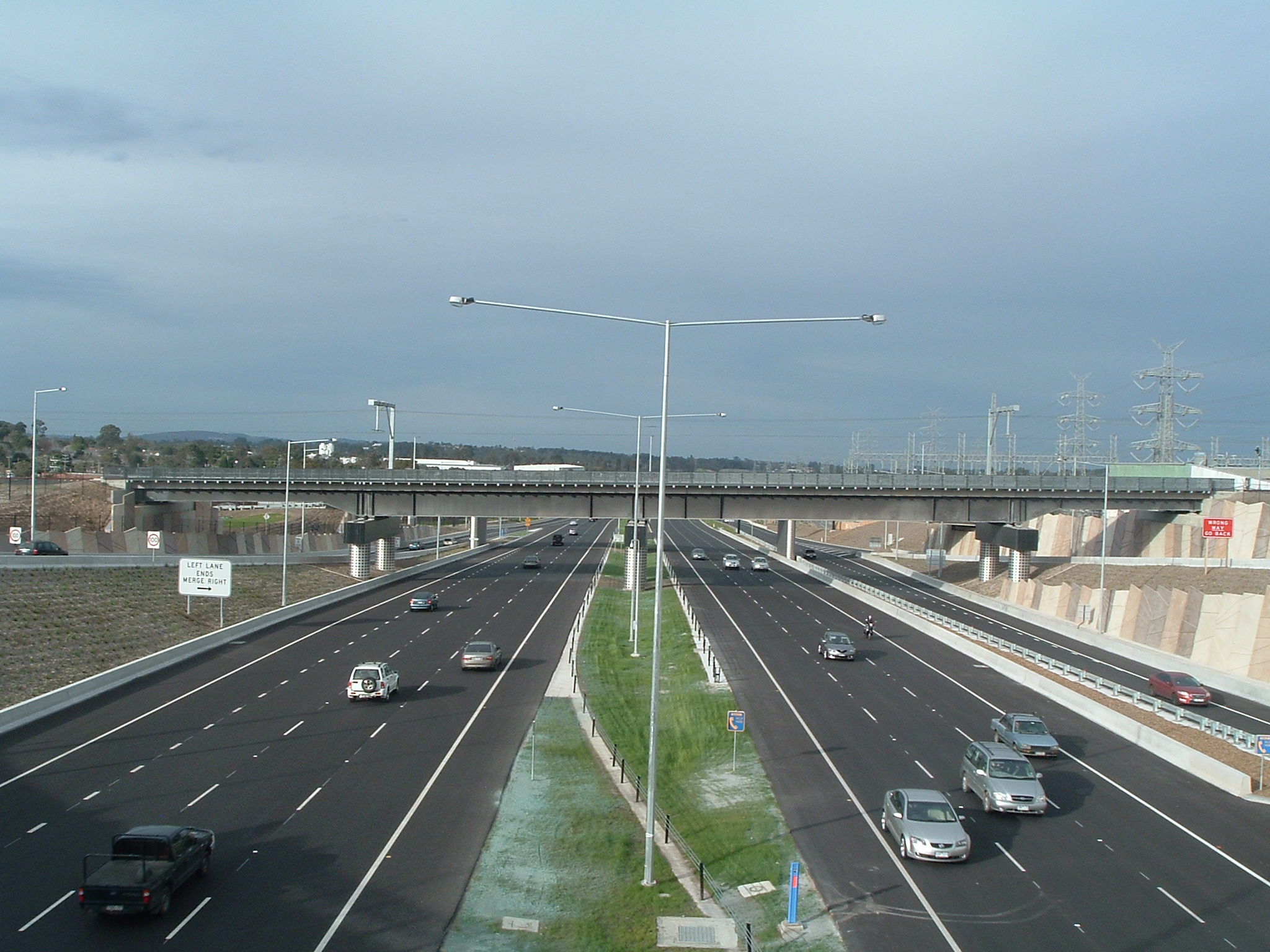
Maroondah Highway bridge, Ringwood looking towards the railway bridge

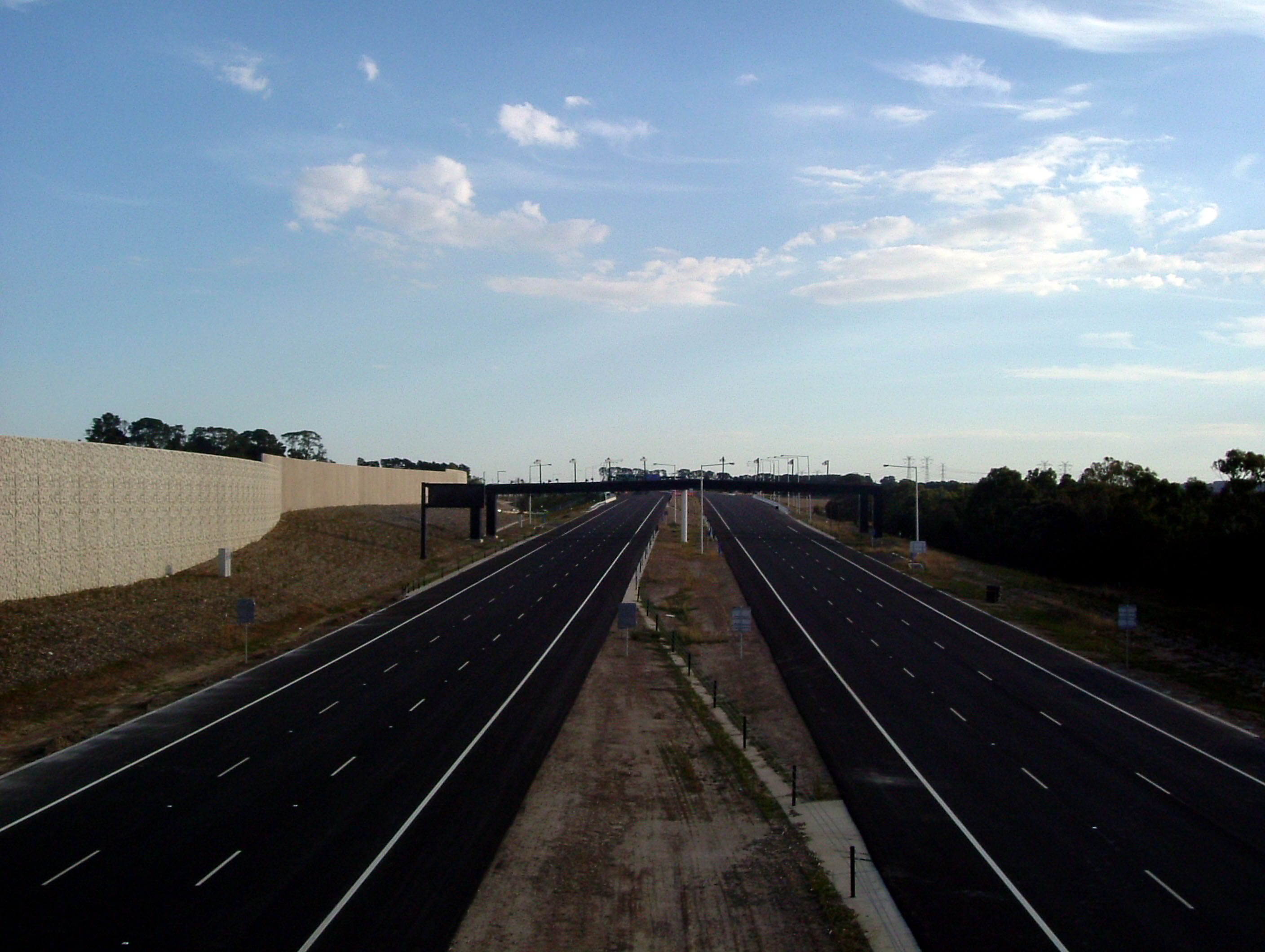
EastLink looking south from the Koomba Road footbridge before opening.

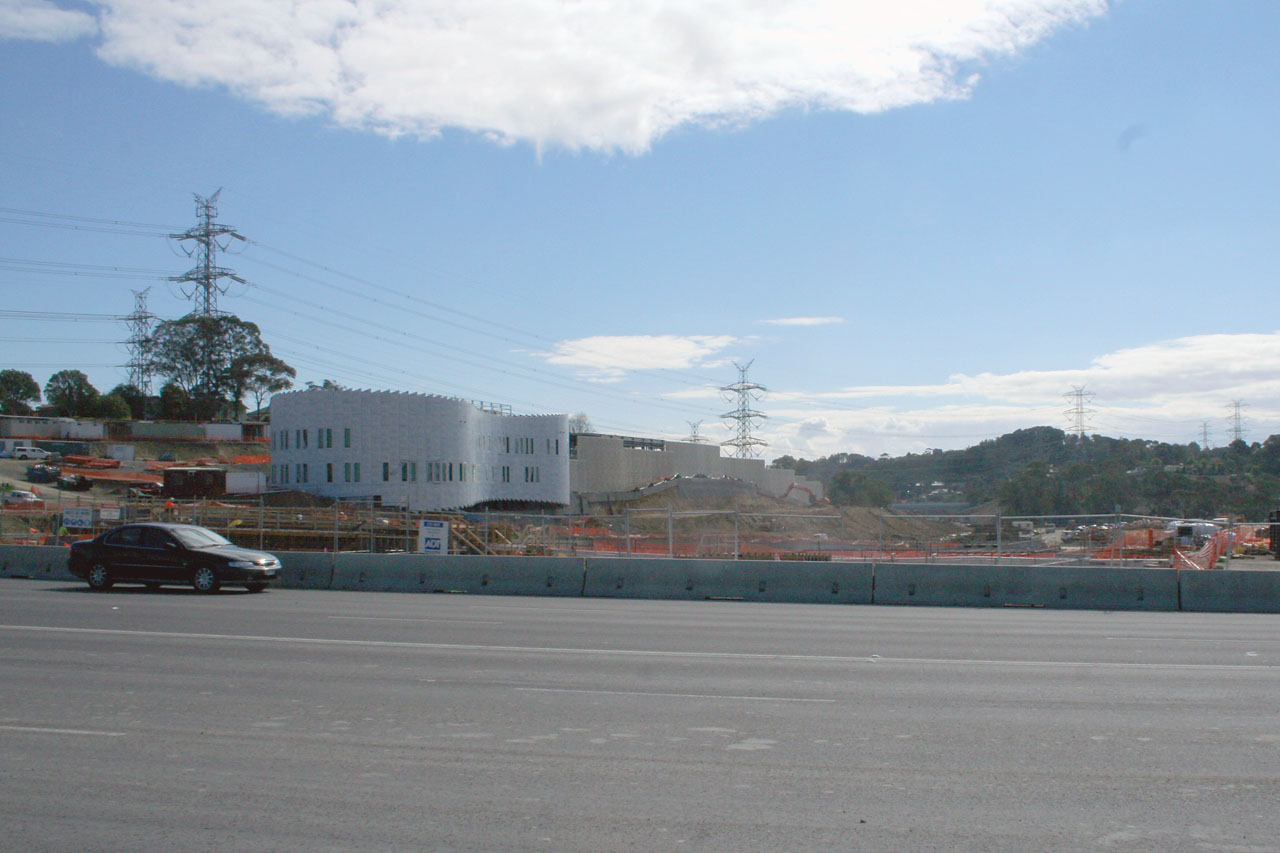
The EastLink Operations Centre in Ringwood during construction.

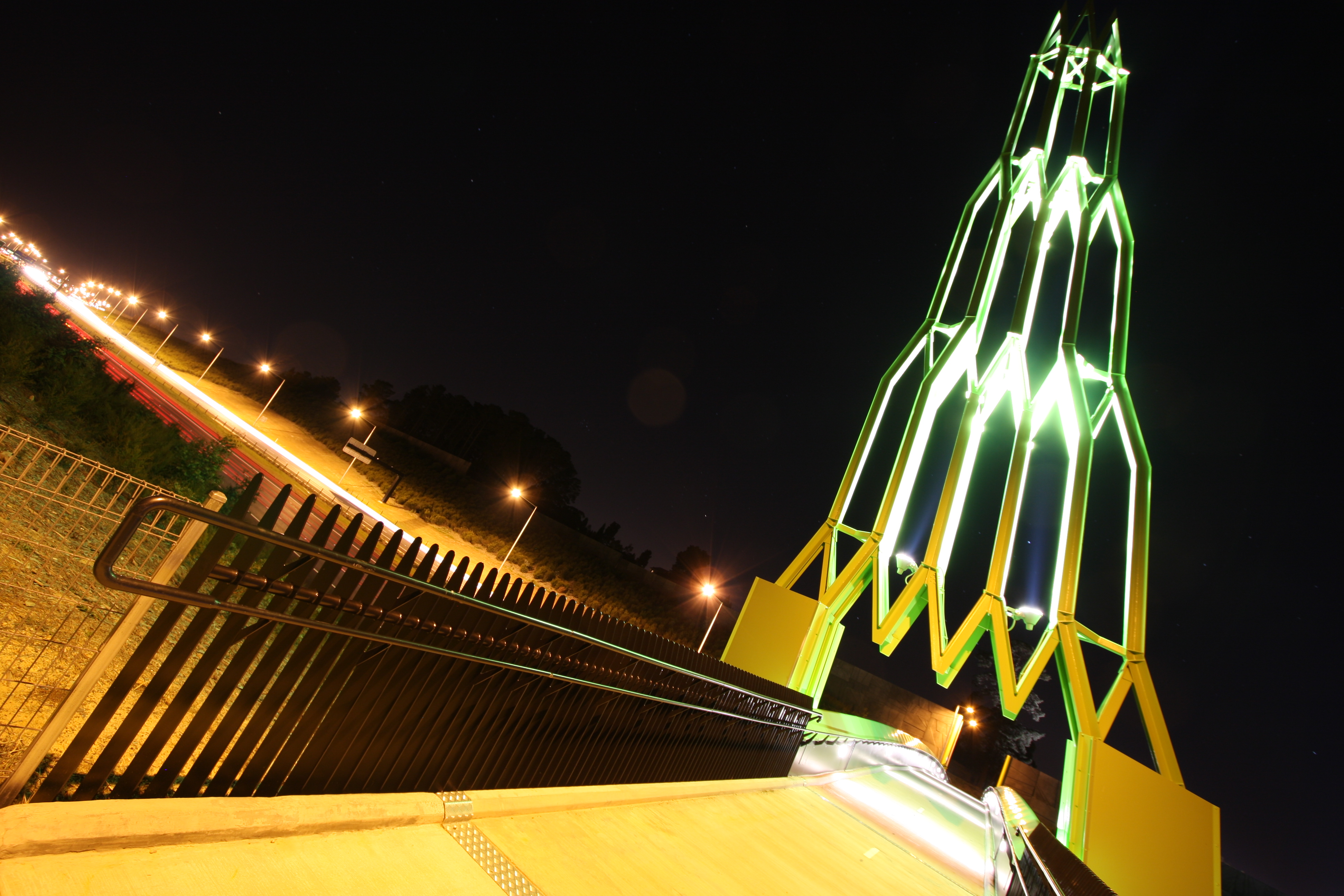
Night-shot of overpass spanning Eastlink, near the Burwood Rd exit.

EastLink begins at the eastern end of the Eastern Freeway at Springvale Road in Nunawading, before tunnelling eastward towards Ringwood under the Mullum Mullum Creek area. It then travels 40 km south towards Frankston, passing through the suburbs of Wantirna, Wantirna South, Scoresby, Rowville, Mulgrave, Dandenong North, Noble Park, Keysborough, Dandenong South, Bangholme, and Carrum Downs, before ending at the northern end of the Frankston Freeway. The majority of the freeway has three lanes running in each direction, while between Thompson Rd and Frankston Freeway, there are 2 lanes running in each direction.

The standard travel time on EastLink in both directions, is 26 minutes, (12 minutes between Frankston Freeway / Peninsula Link and the Monash Freeway, 7 minutes between the Monash Freeway and the Burwood Highway and 7 minutes between the Burwood Highway and Springvale Road). Typical travel time is between 30 and 40 minutes.

EastLink does not regularly have peak period congestion like other urban metropolitan freeways in Melbourne. However, delays can be experienced following roadworks or they might be residual, following an incident. Occasionally, traffic congestion occurs between Thompsons Road and the junction with the other three freeways in Carrum Downs, where the freeway changes from three to two lanes. If the congestion builds, the travel time can reach 40 minutes or beyond.

While the construction of Eastlink alleviated congestion on Springvale Road, it has had the effect of funnelling the traffic onto other roads, particularly increasing traffic on the Eastern Freeway.

== Exits and interchanges ==
LGA	Location	km	mi	Destinations	Notes
Whitehorse–Manningham boundary	Nunawading–Donvale boundary	0.0	0.0	Eastern Freeway (M3) – Collingwood, City	Northern terminus of tollway; continues west as Eastern Freeway
Whitehorse–Manningham boundary	Nunawading–Donvale boundary	0.0	0.0	Springvale Road (Metro Route 40) – Donvale, Nunawading	Single point urban interchange
Manningham	Donvale	1.2	0.75	Toll point 1	
Manningham	Donvale	1.7– 3.3	1.1– 2.1	Melba Tunnel northbound / Mullum Mullum Tunnel southbound	
Maroondah	Ringwood	3.9	2.4	Ringwood Bypass (Metro Route 62) – Ringwood, Lilydale	Semi-directional T interchange; northbound exit uses Maroondah Highway exit and passes it
Maroondah	Ringwood	4.4	2.7	Maroondah Highway (Metro Route 34) – Ringwood, Lilydale, Box Hill, Mitcham	Modified SPUI; northbound exit left turn only - northbound-eastbound must proceed on ramp via Bypass
Maroondah	Ringwood	5.1	3.2	Toll point 2	
Maroondah	Ringwood	6.1	3.8	Canterbury Road (Metro Route 32) – Montrose, Vermont	
Knox	Wantirna	6.9	4.3	Toll point 3	
Knox	Wantirna	7.6	4.7	Boronia Road (Metro Route 36) – Boronia, Vermont	
Knox	Wantirna	8.6	5.3	Toll point 4	
Knox	Wantirna–Wantirna South boundary	9.3	5.8	Burwood Highway (Metro Route 26) – Burwood, Ferntree Gully	
Knox	Wantirna South	10.2	6.3	Toll point 5	
Knox	Wantirna South	11.1	6.9	High Street Road (Metro Route 24) – Glen Waverley, Ferntree Gully	
Knox	Wantirna South	12.2	7.6	Toll point 6	
Knox	Scoresby	14	8.7	Ferntree Gully Road (Metro Route 22) – Ferntree Gully, Oakleigh	
Knox	Scoresby	15.1	9.4	Toll point 7	
Knox	Scoresby	15.3	9.5	Dalmore Drive / Eastlink Outbound BP Service Centre	Southbound exit and entry only
Knox	Scoresby	15.3	9.5	Eastlink Inbound BP Service Centre	Northbound exit and entry only
Knox	Rowville	16.5	10.3	Wellington Road (Metro Route 18) – Mulgrave, Rowville	
Knox	Rowville	17.3	10.7	Toll point 8	
Monash	Mulgrave	18.1	11.2	Police Road (Metro Route 16 west, unallocated east) – Springvale, Dandenong	Southbound exit and northbound entrance only, northbound exit via Monash Freeway exit ramp
Greater Dandenong	Dandenong North	18.9	11.7	Monash Freeway (M1) – City, Warragul, Melbourne Airport	Tom Wills Interchange; no northbound exit to M1 south-eastbound, no southbound entry from M1 north-westbound
Greater Dandenong	Dandenong North	20.8	12.9	Toll point 9	
Greater Dandenong	Dandenong North–Dandenong–Noble Park–Noble Park North quadripoint	21.5	13.4	Princes Highway (National Alt Route 1) – Dandenong, City	
Greater Dandenong	Keysborough	25.8	16.0	Toll point 10	
Greater Dandenong	Keysborough	24.3	15.1	Cheltenham Road (Metro Route 10) – Mentone, Dandenong	Southbound exit and northbound entrance
Greater Dandenong	Keysborough	25.3	15.7	Dandenong Bypass (Metro Route 49 west, no shield east) – Keysborough, Dandenong South	
Greater Dandenong	Keysborough	25.8	16.0	Toll point 11	
Greater Dandenong	Keysborough	26.5	16.5	Greens Road (Metro Route 12) – Mordialloc, Narre Warren	
Greater Dandenong	Bangholme	31.3	19.4	Toll point 12	
Frankston–Greater Dandenong boundary	Carrum Downs–Bangholme boundary	33.1	20.6	Thompson Road (Metro Route 6) – Carrum, Cranbourne	
Frankston	Carrum Downs	35.5	22.1	Toll point 13	
Frankston	Carrum Downs	36.9	22.9	Mornington Peninsula Freeway (M11) – Baxter, Rosebud, Portsea	Southbound exit to M11 south-eastbound, northbound entrance from M11 north-westbound
Frankston	Seaford	37.7	23.4	Rutherford Road (B664) – Carrum Downs, Skye	Southbound exit and northbound entrance only
Frankston	Seaford	37.7	23.4	Frankston Freeway (M3) – Frankston	Southern terminus of tollway; continues south as Frankston Freeway
Incomplete access; Tolled; Route transition

== Dandenong Bypass ==
A 4.8 km section of the Dingley Freeway called the Dandenong Bypass (also referred to as the Dandenong Southern Bypass during its construction) was built by ConnectEast and Thiess John Holland as part of the EastLink project. The bypass opened on 9 December 2007.

== Tolling ==
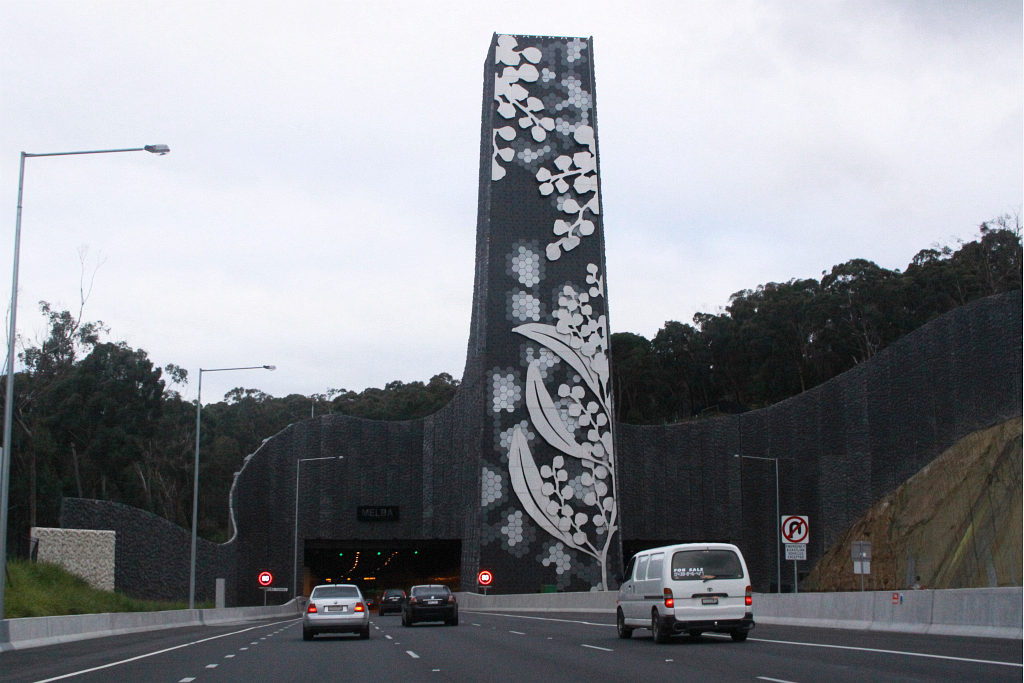
Ringwood portal of the tunnels under the Mullum Mullum Valley

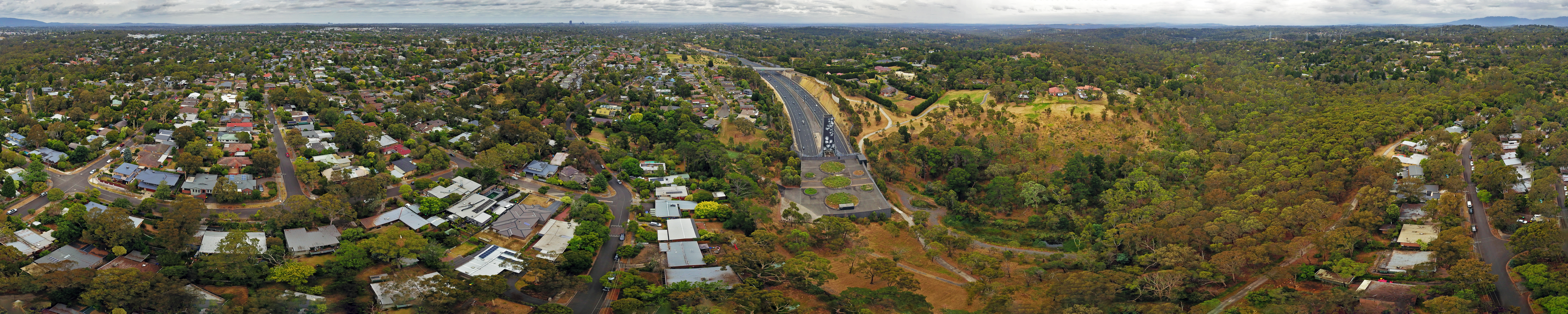
Hillcrest Reserve and the Eastlink Melba Tunnel in January 2020

EastLink is electronically tolled via a system commercially called Breeze, entirely provided by SICE, Spanish system integrator company with broad experience in the tolling market. This system is fully interoperable with all other tollways in Australia, including the Transurban e-TAG system used on CityLink.

The system features a uniquely designed electronic vehicle tag, the "Breeze Tag", which is about half the size of the standard design of e-TAG. The Breeze system is provided by Spanish company SICE, with the Road Side Equipment, including the Breeze Tags, provided by Swedish firm Kapsch TrafficCom AB, under the PREMID brand of DSRC products.

Tolls on EastLink can be charged in three different ways:

- By having any Australian electronic tolling "tag" (such as a Breeze Tag, or Transurban's e-TAG) in the vehicle. Tolls are charged to the corresponding tag account.
- By registering a Breeze non-tag account with ConnectEast. A photograph of the number plate(s) of each vehicle is taken and matched to an account, charging the account holder the toll plus a small processing fee (30c, waived for motorcycles). Alternatively, "Access" accounts registered with CityLink may also be used in this manner. Vehicles with metalised windscreens which cannot be electronically scanned will avoid the extra fee if the owner registers it with Eastlink as such. The toll is then charged to the account by number plate recognition.
- By purchasing a "trip pass" valid for a single one-way trip on EastLink from ConnectEast either over the telephone, via the EastLink website, or from a retail outlet. Vehicle recognition for trip passes is done the same way as for non-tag accounts. Drivers can purchase multiple trip passes at once, as passes are stored until used. However, trip passes expire six months from the date of purchase.

If a driver travels on EastLink without taking any of the three actions above to pay for the toll(s) either prior to, or within three days after travel, an invoice for cost of the toll(s) plus an account processing fee will be sent to the registered vehicle's owner. If the toll invoice is not paid, an overdue notice (with an additional processing fee) is issued. If the invoice is still not paid, a fine is issued by Victoria Police.

The concession period held by ConnectEast is due to end on 30 November 2043, after which the ownership of the road will be transferred to the state.

=== Prices and discounts ===
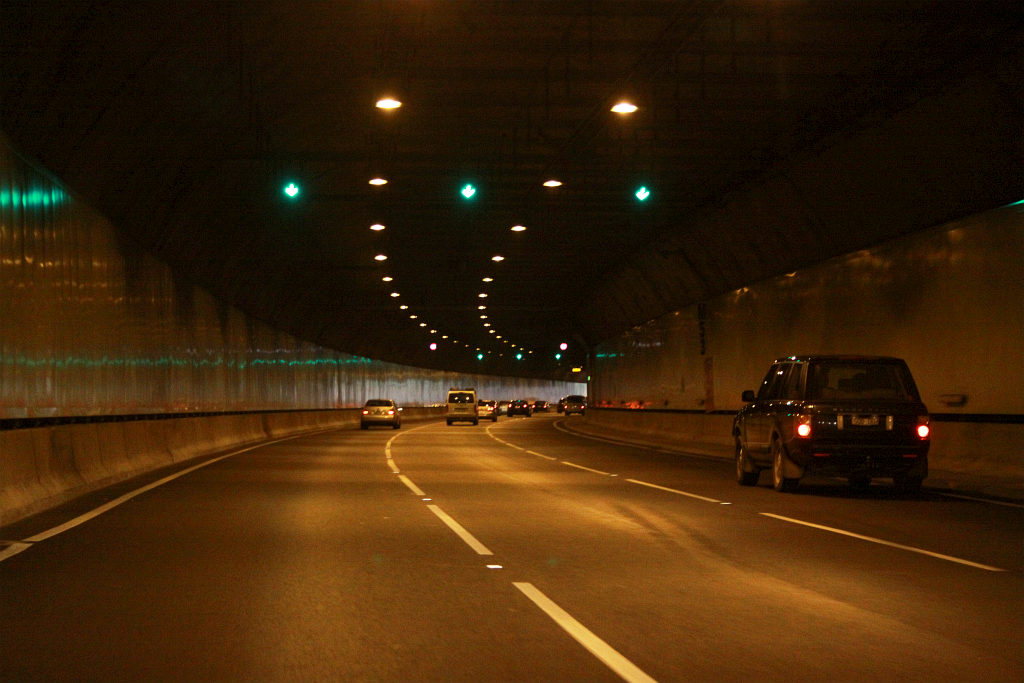
Inside the Melba (westbound) tunnel

Multiple toll points are located along the EastLink, with each toll point charging a fixed fee. The total toll incurred per trip is the smaller of the trip cap or the total price of toll points passed through. The exception is taxis which pay a fixed price for travel on any section south of Maroondah Highway, regardless of the distance travelled or number of toll points passed through.

The cheapest toll points are located between Maroondah Highway and High Street Road, with slightly more expensive toll points located in the longer sections near the south of the tollway, and the most expensive one within the tunnel section between Maroondah Highway / Ringwood Bypass and Springvale Road. Motorcycle prices are half of cars, while higher rates apply for larger vehicles.

Discounts are also offered to car drivers. A 20 per cent discount applies to the cost of any car trip(s) taken on a Saturday or Sunday and also to one way trips between two consecutive interchanges (excluding the tunnels) on weekdays.

Toll prices as of 1 July 2025
Toll road	Toll section or toll points	Maximum toll price per trip					Toll increase	Toll concessionaire	Expiry of toll concession
Toll road	Toll section or toll points	Cars	Motorcycles	Light Commercial Vehicles	Heavy Commercial Vehicles	Long Heavy Commercial Vehicles	Toll increase	Toll concessionaire	Expiry of toll concession
EastLink	Tunnel section	$3.56 (Note: Prices shown for cars are weekday prices. Weekend and public holiday prices are 80% of weekday prices (weekend and public holiday trip cap is $6.22.)	$1.78	$5.71	$9.46		Annually on 1 July by CPI	ConnectEast	2043
EastLink	Each of the four toll points between Maroondah Highway and High Street Road	$0.52	$0.27	$0.83	$1.38		Annually on 1 July by CPI	ConnectEast	2043
EastLink	Each of the six toll points between High Street Road and Greens Road	$0.78	$0.39	$1.24	$2.06		Annually on 1 July by CPI	ConnectEast	2043
EastLink	Each of the two toll points between Greens Road and Mornington Peninsula Freeway	$1.82	$0.90	$2.90	$4.81		Annually on 1 July by CPI	ConnectEast	2043
EastLink	Trip cap	$7.77	$3.88	$12.43	$20.58		Annually on 1 July by CPI	ConnectEast	2043

== Shared path ==
The EastLink Trail is a shared walking and cycle path that follows a similar north–south route to the EastLink project. Using it, cyclists and pedestrians are able to cycle or walk most of the distance of the road, along a 3-metre wide dedicated concrete path. Many major roads are crossed via under or over passes. Some roads, such as High Street Road (and until November 2009, Burwood Highway), require crossing the road at grade.

In wet weather, two underpasses are not trafficable as they have been built on floodways. These are the Ferntree Gully Road underpass and the Wellington Road underpass. After a medium amount of rain the underpasses flood and trail users must cross over the major roads to continue along the path. This can prove dangerous and during peak traffic times, trail users are known to have waited up to 20 minutes to safely cross the roads when the underpasses have flooded.

The Eastlink trail stops in Dandenong and does not continue. Users may take the Dandenong Creek Trail from this point which will take them to Carrum, where they will be able to join the Peninsula Link trail to Frankston and Mornington.

For those using the trail, substantial deviations from EastLink must be taken into account in travel times as the shared path does not follow the freeway in many cases as existing trails were joined up to the trails specifically built during the construction of the road. This has led to some very twisty sections of trail and in some cases, detours of over 3 km from the EastLink.

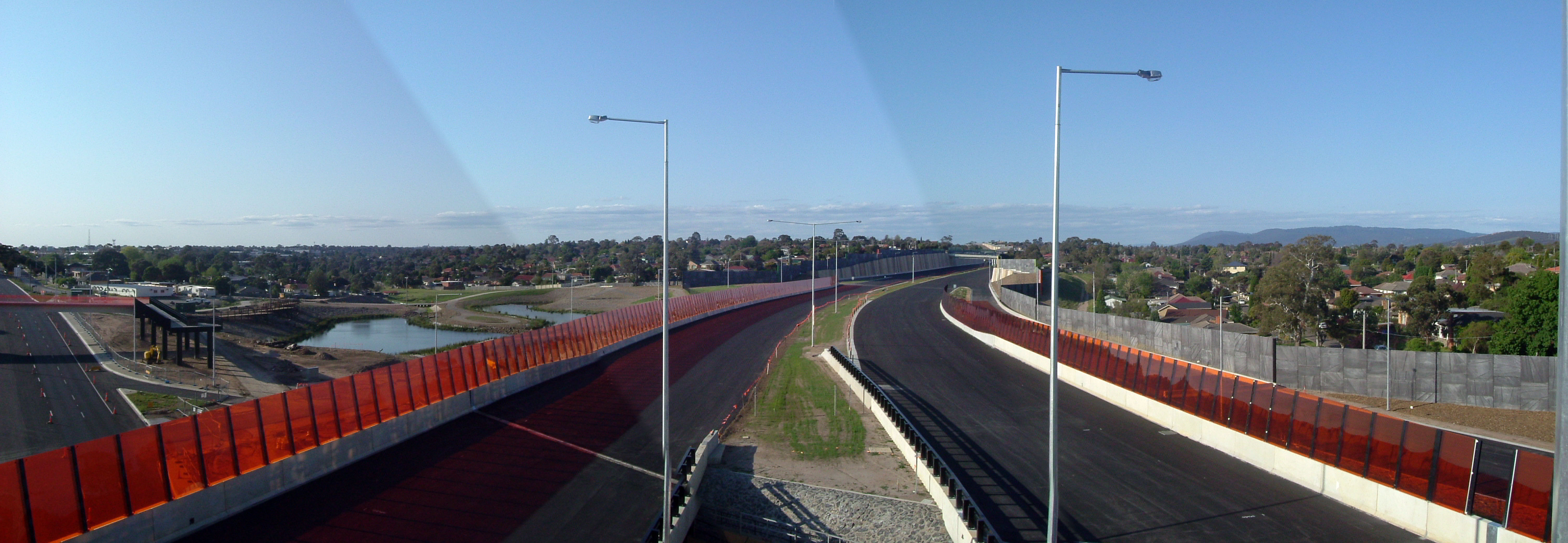
A panoramic view of EastLink looking north from the Heatherton Road bridge.

== Environmental issues ==
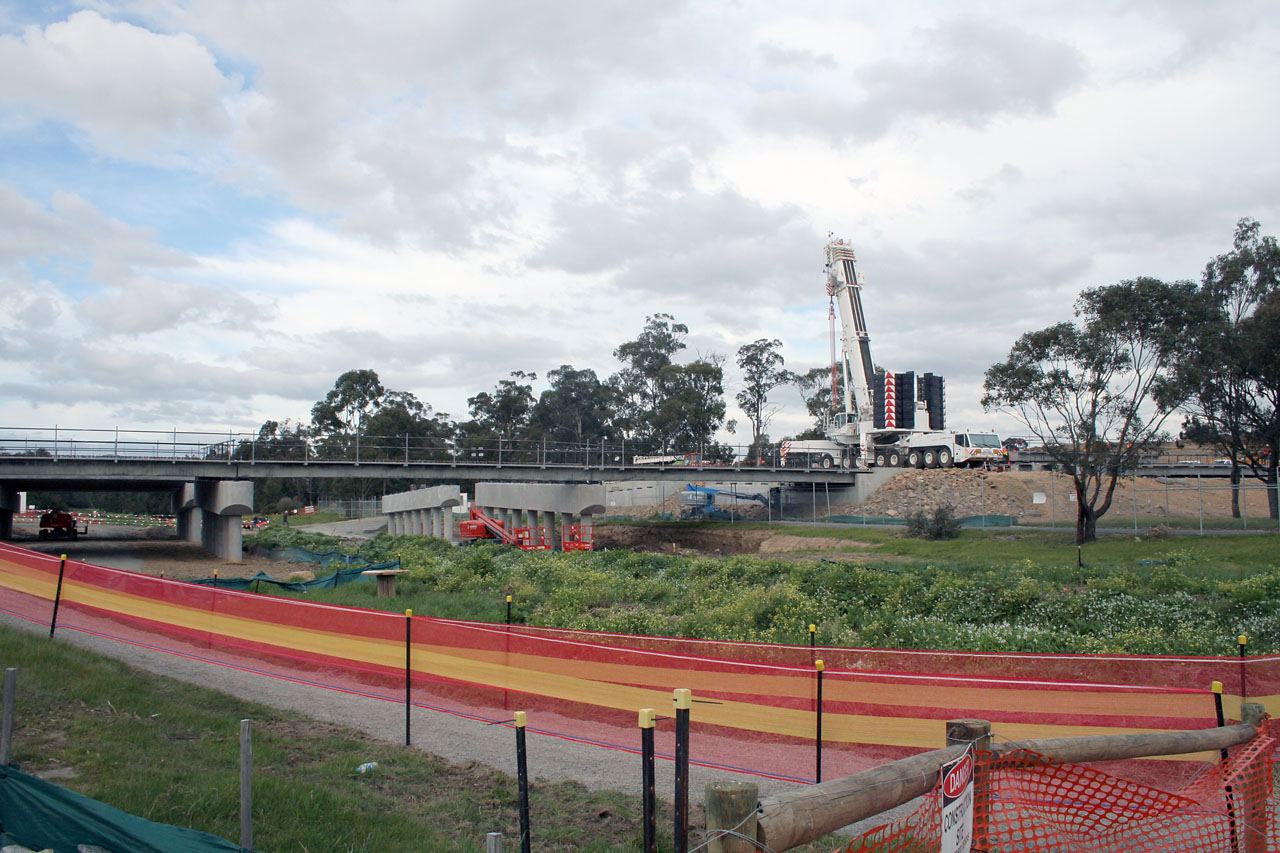
Constructing the EastLink bridge over Dandenong Creek, in Ringwood/Wantirna

The road was the subject of an Environmental Effects Statement (June 1998), which was followed by a public hearing process in April 1999 before the final Government decision to proceed. The statement predicted an 18.5per cent increase in carbon dioxide, impacts on groundwater and wetlands, high impacts on areas of conservation value and the potential to affect 38 species of rare or threatened fauna and flora if the freeway was built.

One notable example of EastLink's negative ecological impact is the Yarraman Creek, a first-order right bank tributary of the Dandenong Creek that forms the suburban border between Noble Park and Dandenong. The Fotheringham Reserve, which is located along the creek section between the Princes Highway and the Pakenham–Cranbourne line, hosts one of the largest intact, remnant river red gum (Eucalyptus camaldulensis) woodlands in the Dandenong Valley, and is among the westernmost native ranges of the endangered eastern dwarf galaxias (Galaxiella pusilla). The creek was partly re-routed in 2006 to make way for the EastLink construction, with several creek sections converted into concrete-lined culverts or downcut channels with exposed bedrocks and little substrates. As a result, the creek's riparian health has since declined, and the billabong wetlands along the creek no longer flood during the winter seasons and become gradually filled by the accumulation of plant litters and runoff sediments, thereby reducing the bushlands' water-retaining capacity to sufficiently sustain aquatic plants and aquatic/semiaquatic faunae.

EastLink's builders stated that the road would relieve traffic congestion throughout Melbourne's eastern and south-eastern suburbs, resulting in more efficient traffic flow, therefore reducing fuel consumption and exhaust output.

During the planning phase (then a VicRoads project), a large debate surrounding damage to the Mullum Mullum Valley occurred. A number of options for the path of the road through the valley were considered. The option chosen – for two 1.6 km tunnels – was the second-to-most expensive, and the second-to-most environmentally friendly. Other options considered in planning included a surface road for the entire length, much shorter tunnels, and slightly longer tunnels.

However, despite the attention on tunnelling beneath the Mullum Mullum Gorge, the Ringwood Interchange is entirely above-ground and has resulted in relocation of the creek through this area.

== See also ==
- Eastlink hotel
- Freeways in Australia
- Freeways in Melbourne
