= Eastlink hotel =

Sculpture in Australia

Coordinates: 38.025952°S 145.188830°E

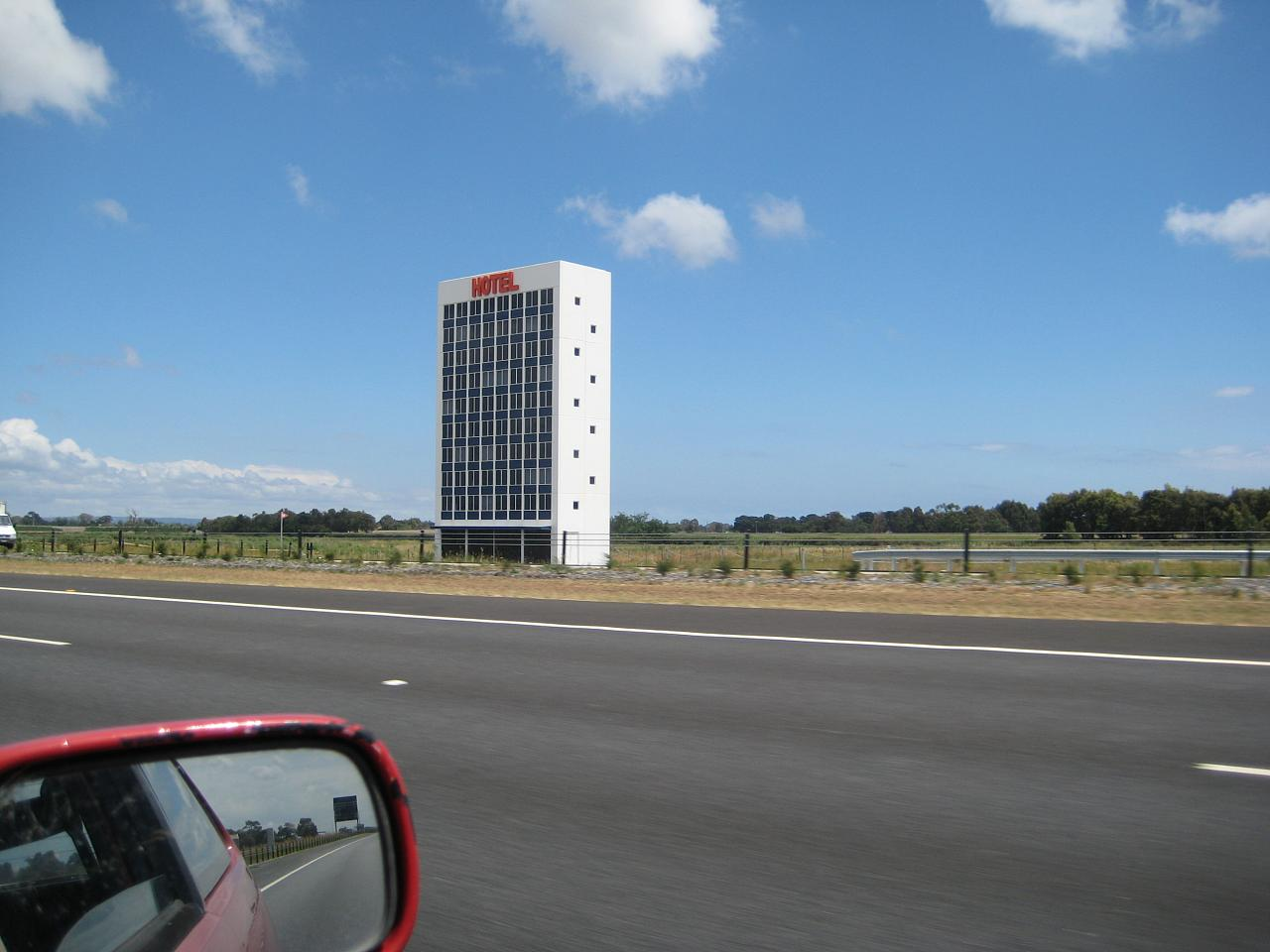
The EastLink hotel

The EastLink hotel is a sculpture designed by Callum Morton. It was unveiled on 27 November 2007 and cost A$1.2 million to construct. It is situated along EastLink, a toll road located in Victoria, Australia. During the night, windows randomly light up, giving the illusion of several "hotel" guests.

== In popular culture ==
In April 2019, American folk punk band Violent Femmes released their album Hotel Last Resort, which features a photograph of the hotel on its cover.
