= Maroondah Highway =

Highway in Victoria, Australia

Maroondah Highway Whitehorse Road Victoria
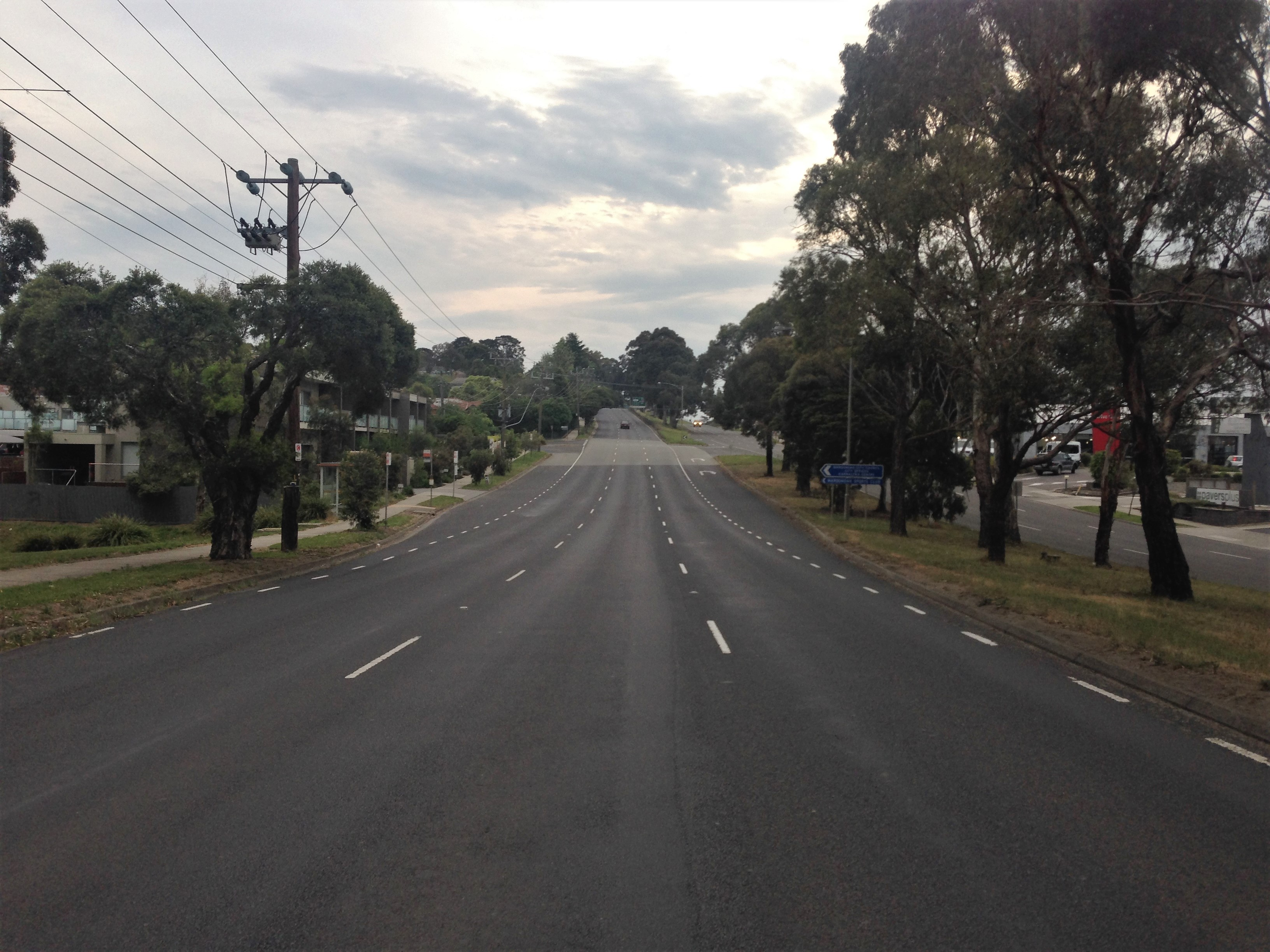
- Maroondah Highway through Ringwood, 2019
- Coordinates: 37.810371°S 145.060684°E (Southwest end); 37.052093°S 146.088089°E (Northeast end)

General information
- Type: Highway
- Length: 187.5 km (117 mi)
- Gazetted: October 1913 (as Main Road); 1947/48 (as State Highway)
- Route number(s): Metro Route 34 (1965–present) (Deepdene–Lilydale); B300 (1998–present) (Lilydale–Coldstream, Yarck–Maindample); B360 (1998–present) (Coldstream–Alexandra); C516 (1998–present) (Koriella–Yarck); B320 (1998–present) (Maindample–Mansfield); Concurrencies: Metro Route 13 (1965–present) (through Blackburn); Metro Route 9 (1965–present) (through Ringwood); Metro Route 7 (1989–present) (through Croydon); B340 (1998–present) (Alexandra–Koriella)
- Former route number: Metro Route 34 (1986–1998) (Lilydale–Alexandra); State Route 153 (1986–1998) (Yarck–Maindample); Alternative State Route 153 (1986–1998) (Maindample–Mansfield); Concurrencies: State Route 175 (1986–1998) (through Healesville); State Route 168 (1986–1998) (Alexandra–Koriella)

Major junctions
- Southwest end: Cotham Road; Deepdene, Melbourne
- Burke Road; Middleborough Road; Springvale Road; EastLink; Warburton Highway; Melba Highway; Goulburn Valley Highway; Midland Link Highway
- Northeast end: Mount Buller Road; Mansfield, Victoria

Location(s)
- Region: Greater Melbourne, Hume
- Major settlements: Nunawading, Ringwood, Lilydale, Coldstream, Healesville, Buxton, Alexandra, Merton

Highway system
- Highways in Australia; National Highway • Freeways in Australia; Highways in Victoria

Maroondah Highway (also known as Whitehorse Road from Deepdene to Surrey Hills) is a major east–west thoroughfare in the eastern suburbs of Melbourne, and a highway connecting the north-eastern fringes of Melbourne to Mansfield, at the lower alpine region of Victoria, Australia.

Maroondah Link Highway links Cathkin (on Goulburn Valley Highway) and Yarck (on Maroondah Highway), allowing an easier link to Melba Highway via Yea for Melbourne traffic.

== Route ==
Whitehorse Road/Maroondah Highway commences at the intersection of Cotham Road and Burke Road at Deepdene, and heads in an easterly direction as a four lane, single carriageway arterial road (with on-street tram tracks), through the suburbs of Balwyn and Deepdene; the route 109 tram also runs along this stretch of the road. It continues east through Mont Albert, to the intersection with Elgar Road in Box Hill, where the road widens to four-lane dual carriageway, with trams running down the central median strip (Burke Road and Elgar Roads being the east and west boundaries of Captain Elgar's original two mile square property); the tram tracks terminate at Market Street, a few blocks further on, and it widens further to a six-lane dual-carriageway just beyond at the intersection with Station Street. It continues east through the suburbs of Blackburn and Nunawading to the intersection with Mitcham Road in Mitcham, where Whitehorse Road ends and the road continues east only as Maroondah Highway. It continues north-east past Croydon to the intersection with Mooroolbark and Victoria Roads on the western edge of Lilydale, where it narrows to a four-lane single carriageway road, and runs through Iliydale, after which it becomes a rural highway. There is a moderately steep and moderately twisty section through forest between Healesville and Buxton, and the road then continues through farmland all the way through Alexandra and Bonnie Doon to eventually terminate at the intersection with Midland Highway in Mansfield.

== History ==
In the 1850s, Whitehorse Road was built to be the primary route from Melbourne to Gippsland, a rather circuitous route which went via the Dandenong Ranges. Today the primary route is now via the Monash and Princes Freeways.

The road, when first built, was named Three Chain Road, due to the road width being 66 yards (60 m) wide.

The traffic led to the establishment of a hotel in Box Hill named the White Horse hotel which had been named for a horse belonging to Captain Elgar, a property owner in the area. It is this hotel of which the road obtained its name. However, the hotel was forced to shut its doors in 1921 when Box Hill became a dry area. A replica of the white horse from the roof of the hotel now stands in the median strip of Whitehorse Road, while the restored original is located in the Box Hill Town Hall.

The passing of the Country Roads Act 1912 through the Parliament of Victoria provided for the establishment of the Country Roads Board (later VicRoads) and their ability to declare Main Roads, taking responsibility for the management, construction and care of the state's major roads from local municipalities. (Main) Healesville Road, from Ringwood through Lilydale to the Yarra River on the western edge of Healesville, and Healesville-Alexandra Road, from the Yarra River to Buxton, were declared Main Roads on 20 October 1913; the rest of Healesville-Alexandra Road from Buxton through Taggerty to Alexandra, and Cathkin-Mansfield Road from Cathkin to Merton, were declared as Main Roads on 16 November 1914; Mansfield Road from Merton through Mansfield to Merrijig was declared a Main Road on 30 November 1914; another portion of Main Healesville Road between Nunawading and Ringwood was declared a Main Road on 3 May 1915; and Yarck Road between Yarck and Koriella was declared a Main Road on 20 September 1915.

The passing of the Highways and Vehicles Act 1924 provided for the declaration of State Highways, roads two-thirds financed by the state government through the Country Roads Board. Maroondah Highway was declared a State Highway in the 1947/48 financial year, from Union Road in Surrey Hills via Lilydale, Healesville, Alexandra, Yarck and Merton to Mansfield (for a total of 116 miles), subsuming the original declaration of (Main) Healesville Road, Healesville-Alexandra Road, Yarck Road, Cathkin-Mansfield Road (between Yarck and Merton) and Mansfield Road as Main Roads. Maroondah Link Highway was later declared as a State Highway on 9 May 1983, subsuming the remaining declaration of Cathkin-Mansfield Road between Yarck and Cathkin as a Main Road.

Maroondah Highway was signed as Metropolitan Route 34 between Deepdene and Lilydale in 1965, later extended to Alexandra in 1986, and signed State Route 153 between Yarck and Mansfield in 1986. With Victoria's conversion to the newer alphanumeric system in the late 1990s, Metropolitan Route 34 was truncated back to Lilydale, and replaced by routes B300 between Lilydale and Coldstream, route B360 between Coldstream and Alexandra, C516 between Koriella and Yarck, B300 between Yarck and Maindample, and B320 between Maindample and Mansfield. Maroondah Link Highway was signed State Route 153 between Cathkin and Yarck in 1986, and was later replaced by route B300.

The passing of the Road Management Act 2004 granted the responsibility of overall management and development of Victoria's major arterial roads to VicRoads: in 2004, VicRoads declared this road as Whitehorse Road (Arterial #5996), beginning from Burke Road in Balwyn and ending at Union Road, Surrey Hills, as Maroondah Highway (Arterial #6720), from Burke Road to where it meets Midland Highway in Mansfield (this declaration overlaps the Whitehorse Road declaration in its entirety: dual-naming is observed on signposts, but despite ending in Surrey Hills dual-naming has been confusingly signposted as far east as Mitcham Road), and as Maroondah Link Highway (Arterial #6020), from Goulburn Valley Highway in Cathkin to Maroondah Highway in Yarck.

== Major intersections and towns ==
LGA	Location	km	mi	Destinations	Notes
Boroondara	Kew–Deepdene boundary	0.0	0.0	Cotham Road (Metro Route 34) – Kew, Collingwood, Parkville	Western terminus of highway and Whitehorse Road; Metro Route 34 continues west along Cotham Road
Boroondara	Kew–Deepdene boundary	0.0	0.0	Burke Road (Metro Route 17) – Camberwell, Heidelberg	
Boroondara	Balwyn	1.8	1.1	Balwyn Road – Canterbury, Bulleen	
Boroondara	Surrey Hills	3.4	2.1	Union Road – Surrey Hills, Balwyn	Eastern terminus of Whitehorse Road (declared)
Boroondara	Mont Albert–Box Hill boundary	4.8	3.0	Elgar Road – Burwood, Doncaster	
Whitehorse	Box Hill	5.6	3.5	Station Street (Metro Route 47) – Huntingdale, Doncaster	
Whitehorse	Box Hill–Blackburn boundary	6.9	4.3	Middleborough Road (Metro Route 23) – Clayton, Mount Waverley, Doncaster	
Whitehorse	Blackburn	8.3	5.2	Chapel Street (Blackburn Road) (Metro Route 13 north) – Blackburn, Syndal, Monash University	Concurrency with Metro Route 13
Whitehorse	Blackburn	8.5	5.3	Surrey Road (Blackburn Road) (Metro Route 13 south) – Doncaster East, Warrandyte	Concurrency with Metro Route 13
Whitehorse	Nunawading	10.2	6.3	Springvale Road (Metro Route 40) – Glen Waverley, Donvale	
Whitehorse	Mitcham	11.8	7.3	Mitcham Road (Metro Route 36) – Wantirna, Donvale, Doncaster	Eastern terminus of Whitehorse Road (sign-posted)
Maroondah	Ringwood	13.8	8.6	EastLink (M3) – Clifton Hill, Frankston; Ringwood Bypass (Metro Route 62) – Ringwood	Modified SPUI northbound exit from EastLink westbound only
Maroondah	Ringwood	14.8	9.2	Wantirna Road (Metro Route 9 south) – Wantirna	Concurrency with Metro Route 9
Maroondah	Ringwood	15.2	9.4	Warrandyte Road (Metro Route 9 north) – Warrandyte	Concurrency with Metro Route 9
Maroondah	Ringwood	15.8	9.8	Ringwood Bypass (Metro Route 62 west) – Ringwood; Mount Dandenong Road (Metro Route 62 east) – Croydon, Mount Dandenong	
Maroondah	Croydon	20.2	12.6	Kent Avenue (Metro Route 7 south) – Croydon, Bayswater	Concurrency with Metro Route 7
Maroondah	Croydon North–Croydon boundary	20.4	12.7	Yarra Road (Metro Route 7 north) – Wonga Park, Warrandyte	Concurrency with Metro Route 7
Maroondah	Croydon North–Croydon boundary	22.9	14.2	Dorset Road (Metro Route 5) – Boronia, Ferntree Gully	
Yarra Ranges	Lilydale	28.3	17.6	Lilydale railway line	
Yarra Ranges	Lilydale	29.0	18.0	Anderson Street (C401) – Montrose, Bayswater, to Hereford Road (C404) – Monbulk	Eastern terminus of Metro Route 34, western terminus of route B300
Yarra Ranges	Lilydale	30.8	19.1	Warburton Highway (B380) – Woori Yallock, Warburton	
Yarra Ranges	Coldstream	34.2	21.3	Melba Highway (B300) – Yarra Glen	Route B300 continues north; western terminus of route B360
Yarra River		46.5	28.9	Bridge (no known name)	
Yarra Ranges	Healesville	48.7	30.3	Healesville–Koo Wee Rup Road (C411) – Woori Yallock, Cockatoo, Pakenham, Koo Wee Rup	
Yarra Ranges	Healesville	50.7	31.5	Healesville–Kinglake Road (C724) – Yarra Glen, Kinglake, Yea	
Yarra Ranges	Healesville	51.5	32.0	Badger Creek Road (C505) – Badger Creek	
Yarra Ranges	Healesville	51.9	32.2	Don Road (C506) – Mount Donna Buang, Yarra Junction	
Murrindindi	Narbethong	75.5	46.9	Marysville Road (C512) – Marysville, to Archeron Way (C507) – Warburton	
Murrindindi	Buxton	89.9	55.9	Buxton–Marysville Road (C508) – Lake Mountain, Marysville	
Murrindindi	Taggerty	101.5	63.1	Taggerty–Thornton Road (C515) – Eildon, Jamieson	
Goulburn River		116.7	72.5	Bridge (no known name)	
Murrindindi	Alexandra	119.2	74.1	Goulburn Valley Highway (B340 east) – Eildon	Concurrency with route B340
Murrindindi	Koriella	126.1	78.4	Goulburn Valley Highway (B340 west) – Yea, Seymour	Concurrency with route B340
Murrindindi	Yarck	132.0	82.0	Maroondah Link Highway (B300) – Yea, Yarra Glen, Melbourne	Southbound exit to and northbound entrance from Maroondah Link Highway only
Mansfield	Merton	150.9	93.8	Euroa–Mansfield Road (C366) – Euroa, Shepparton	
Lake Eildon		167.6	104.1	Bridge (no known name)	
Mansfield	Maindample	175.3	108.9	Midland Link Highway (B300) – Benalla	Route B300 continues north; western terminus of route B320
Mansfield	Mansfield	187.5	116.5	Midland Highway (C518 north) – Benalla; Highett Street (south) – Mansfield	Roundabout
Mansfield	Mansfield	187.5	116.5	Mount Buller Road (C320) – Mount Buller, Whitfield	Road continues east as Mount Buller Road; Eastern terminus of route B320, western terminus of route C320
1.000 mi = 1.609 km; 1.000 km = 0.621 mi: Concurrency terminus; Incomplete access; Route transition

== See also ==
- Highways in Australia
- Highways in Victoria
