= Yarck =

- Town
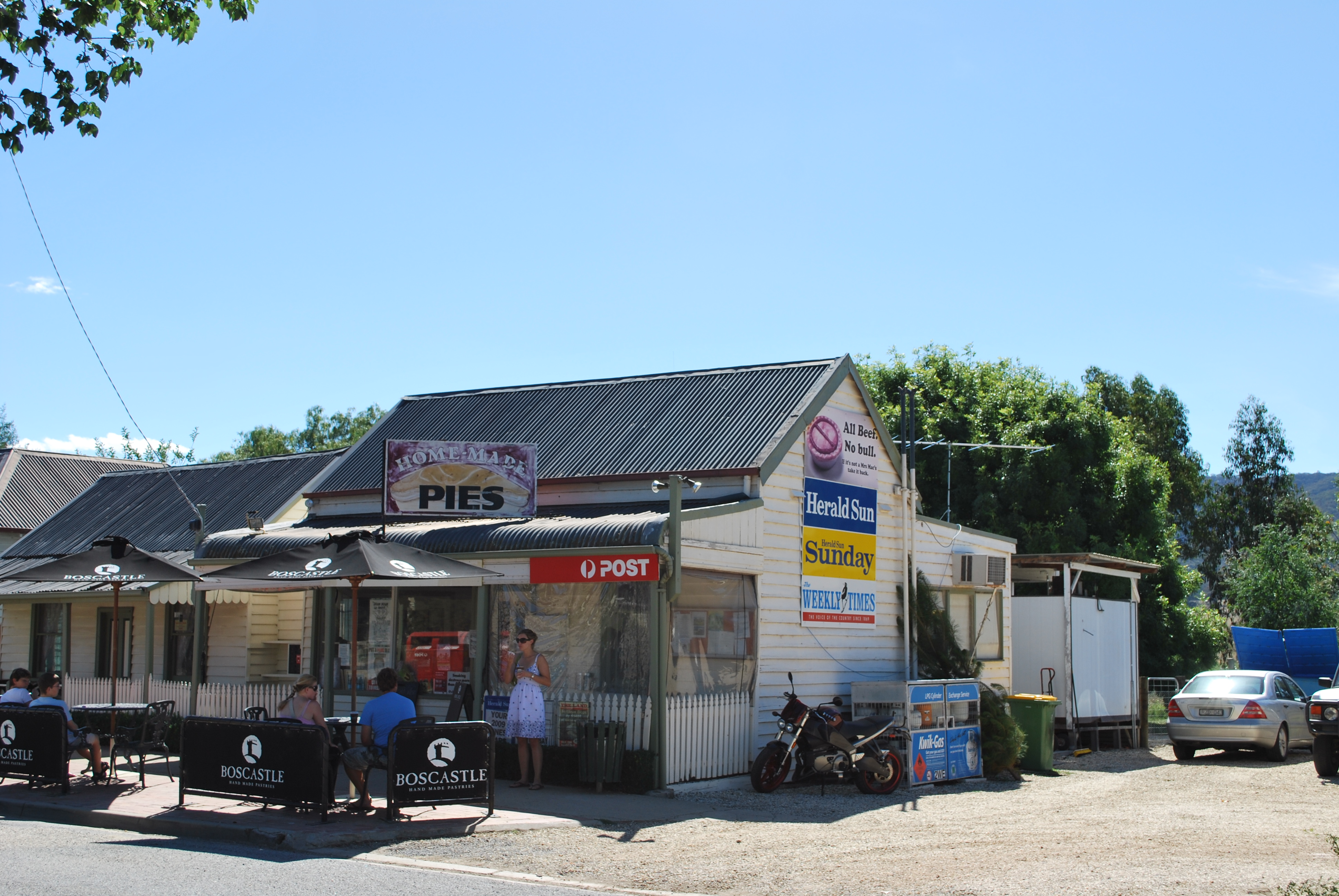
- General store

- Interactive map of Yarck
- Coordinates: 37°05′23″S 145°36′40″E
- Country: Australia
- State: Victoria
- Region: Hume
- LGA: Shire of Murrindindi
- Location: 166 km (103 mi) NE of Melbourne; 55 km (34 mi) W of Mansfield; 14 km (8.7 mi) NW of Alexandra

Government
  - State electorate: Eildon
  - Federal division: Indi

Population
  - Total: 194 (2021 census)
- Postcode: 3719

Yarck is a town in the upper Goulburn Valley region of Victoria, Australia. The town is in the Shire of Murrindindi and on the Maroondah Highway, 166 kilometres (103 mi) north east of the state capital, Melbourne. At the 2016 census, Yarck and the surrounding area had a population of 194.

Yarck Post Office opened around February 1877. The railway arrived in November 1890 when the branch line from Tallarook was extended to Merton. The line and the station closed in 1978.

Facilities in the town include a general store, a hotel, two cafes, a book store, and a bakery.
