= Southwood Boys' Grammar School =

Location
- Ringwood, Victoria; Australia; 37°49′51″S 145°13′27″E

Information
- Type: Independent, single-sex, day
- Motto: Latin: Factis Non Verbis (By deeds not words)
- Denomination: Anglican
- Established: 1999
- Closed: 2013
- Colours: Maroon, navy and white
- Website: www.tinternschools.vic.edu.au

Southwood Boys Grammar School was an independent school located in Ringwood, Victoria, a suburb of Melbourne, Australia. It was the boys campus of Tintern Schools and was founded in 1999, accepting boys up to year 7. In 2014, students were moved to the main Tintern campus and the site was sold to the Salvation Army as their training headquarters. The school still accepts boys from ELC–Year 12, who are part of Tintern Schools.

== History ==
Southwood accepted boys from prep to year 6 in 1999. In its first years, Southwood had 42 students from prep to year 6. Early on, Southwood only had one building (previously housing the junior school), which it obtained from the government primary school that previously occupied the site. A gymnasium, resource centre and new classrooms were later constructed.

== Head of campus ==
The head of campus was the highest permanent position at Southwood (with only the Tintern Schools' Principal and Deputy Principal being higher). Adam Kenny was the final Head of Campus, assuming the position following Mike Philips, who left to return to study, who followed Peter Harte who left in 2009.

- Adam Kenny (2009–2013)
- Mike Phillips (2009–2009)
- Peter Harte (2009–2009)
- Andrew Worner (2007–2008)
- Michael Blood (1999–2006)

During 2008, Andrew Worner announced that he would be leaving the teaching profession to further enhance his professional development. Following Worner's resignation; Jenny Collins announced that in 2009 the Head of Campus position would undergo changes, so that the responsibilities would be shared by three people; the Middle School and Senior College coordinators and the new Head of Campus (Operations) position.

The staff fulfilling these positions in 2009 were:

- Glenda Message (Head of Campus (Operations))
- Peter Harte (Head of Senior School)

== Song ==
In 2005, the school song, titled 'Southwood Boys' was written by Paul Jarman, an Australian musician and was dedicated to Mike Blood, the head of campus at the time. The song was sung as part of the school's annual presentation night, the annual induction ceremony and at other important events.

== Houses ==
- Butterss, Cross, blue.
- Dann, Watt, yellow.
- Grant, Gordon bear, green.
- McKie, Mansfield, red.
- Stewart, Somner, purple.

== See also ==
- List of schools in Victoria
- Victorian Certificate of Education
- International Baccalaureate
- Tintern Schools
