= Ringwood, Victoria =

Suburb of Melbourne, Victoria, Australia

Ringwood
- Suburb
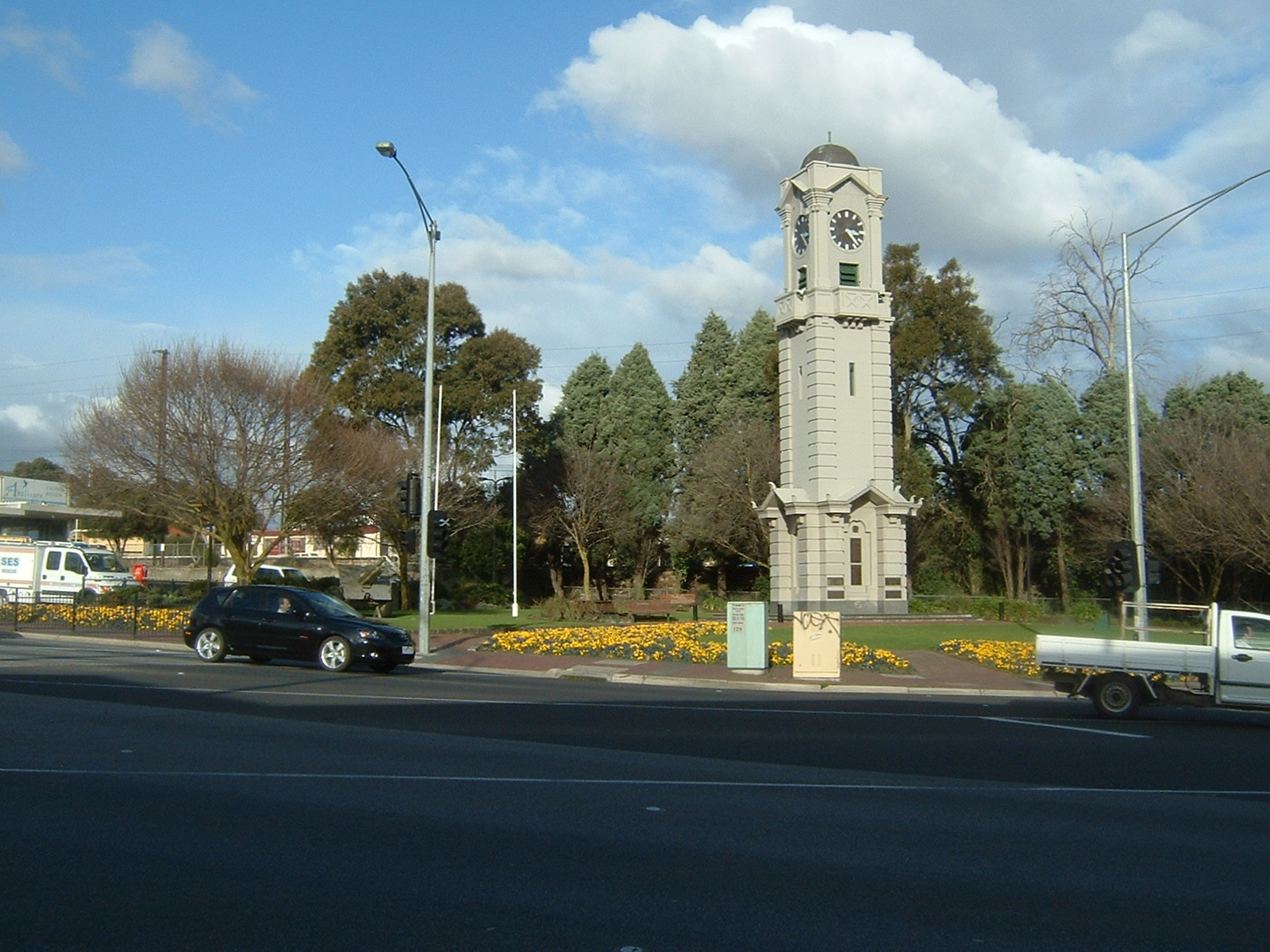
- Ringwood Clocktower

- Interactive map of Ringwood
- Coordinates: 37.811°S 145.231°E
- Country: Australia
- State: Victoria
- Region: Greater Melbourne
- City: Melbourne
- LGA: City of Maroondah
- Location: 20 km (12 mi) E of Melbourne CBD (Central Melbourne)

Government
  - State electorate: Ringwood
  - Federal divisions: Deakin; Aston

Area
  - Total: 10.2 km^{2} (3.9 sq mi)
- Elevation: 123 m (404 ft)

Population
  - Total: 19,144 (2021 census)
  - Density: 1,877/km^{2} (4,861/sq mi)
- Postcode: 3134
- County: Mornington; Evelyn
Suburbs around Ringwood
Donvale	Ringwood North	Croydon
Mitcham	Ringwood	Ringwood East
Vermont	Wantirna	Heathmont

Ringwood is a suburb of Melbourne, Victoria, Australia, 20 km (12 mi) east of Melbourne's Central Business District, located within the City of Maroondah local government area. Ringwood recorded a population of 19,144 at the 2021 census.

Ringwood has many parks and reserves, most notably Ringwood Lake, an 8.5-hectare park is used for various recreational activities which includes a lake with bridge, sound shell, mining history display, playground, picnic shelters, barbecues and a bushland walking circuit.

== History ==
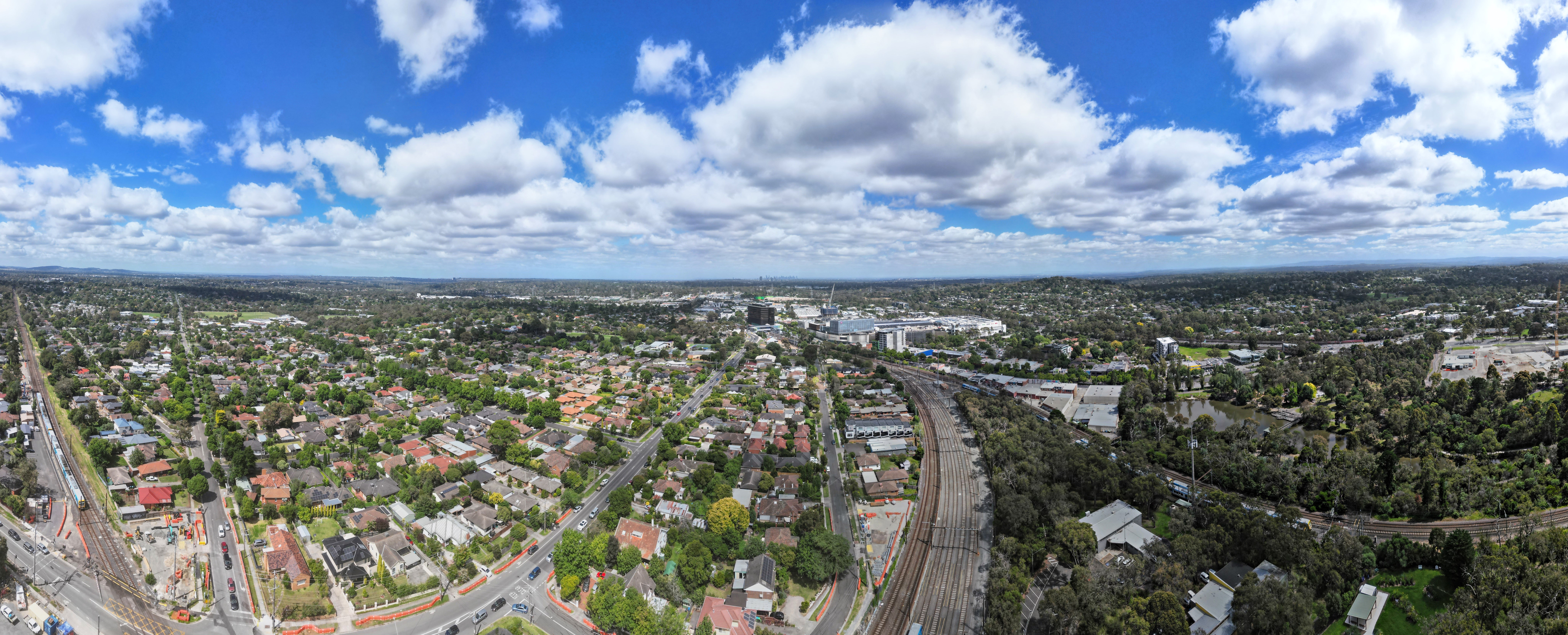
Ringwood aerial panorama of its train station and the Melbourne skyline on the horizon. January 2024.

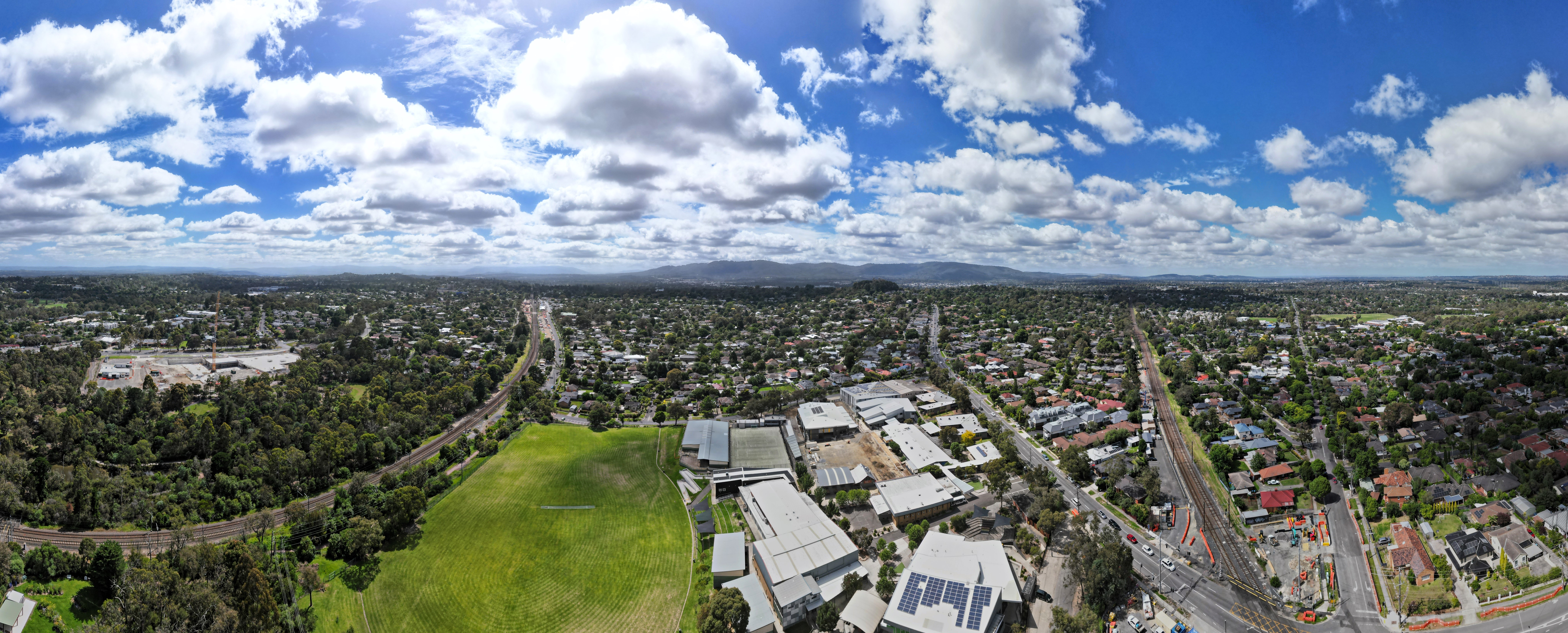
Ringwood aerial panorama facing the Dandenong Ranges. January 2024.

Ringwood village emerged in the mid to late 19th century, following the 1850s land sales. Before this, Ringwood was used primarily for agriculture. The post office opened on 2 August 1875, in the then rural area.

In 1882, the construction of the Hawthorn to Lilydale railway through the suburb caused Ringwood to emerge as a more notable town.

1924 marked major growth for Ringwood. The railway was electrified and the township was further developed. This development boomed post war, causing the City of Ringwood to be declared in 1960.

The Ringwood clock tower was built in 1928 as a memorial to the war. After the successful post-depression subdivisions of land in the area, Ringwood was recognised to be a part of metropolitan Melbourne. Eastland Shopping Centre opened in Ringwood in 1967. It was redeveloped in the late 1990s and again in 2013. Its current state is 131,000 m^{2} (1,410,000 square feet) of retail and hospitality floor space, car parks and a Hoyts cinema complex. In 2009, the owners of Eastland, Queensland Investment Corporation, planned to commence another redevelopment of the Eastland site. The Arcade near Eastland and the Ringwood Library commenced re-location in 2012. Construction on the new centre began in 2013 and was completed in two stages. Stage one opened on 29 October 2015 and stage two on 5 May 2016.

Ringwood has been the site of a Cadbury chocolate factory since the company's acquisition of MacRobertson Chocolates in 1967. The factory is the company's second largest in Australia and produces chocolate bars, such as Cherry Ripe and Boost, and Easter eggs.

In 2009, the State Government controversially approved the building of a nine-storey housing development near Ringwood Lake, without Council or public consultation. In 2007, Ringwood became the home of ConnectEast, owner and operator of Melbourne's second toll road, EastLink. In 2012, major retail chain store Costco announced plans to open in Ringwood. Construction finished mid-2013, and opened on the 20th of November, 2013.

Perhaps Ringwood's most global notoriety is the development in 1958 of the "Pride of Ringwood" hop variety, which today flavours Foster's Lager, Victoria Bitter and many other beers around the world. The hops were developed along the Mullum Mullum Creek, near the site of what later became Penguin Books, in 1963.

=== Transport ===
Ringwood is a major transport hub for the outer eastern suburbs. Ringwood railway station is located on the Lilydale and Belgrave lines, serving as a junction point where the two lines split.

== Demographics ==
In the 2021 census, the population of Ringwood was 19,144, 51.3% female and 48.7% male. The median age was 38.

60.9% of people living in Ringwood were born in Australia. The other top responses for country of birth were 7.3% China, 3.2% India, 2.9% England, 2.8% Myanmar, and 2.1% Malaysia.

63.9% of people living in Ringwood only spoke English at home. The other top languages spoken at home were 9.0% Mandarin, 3.2% Cantonese, 1.5% Persian (excluding Dari), 1.3% Burmese and 1.2% Zomi.

The religious makeup of Ringwood was 43.4% No religion, 15.7% Catholic, 5.7% Anglican, 5.5% Not stated, and 4.2% Baptist.

== Education ==
=== Primary schools ===
- Kalinda Primary School
- Mullum Primary School
- Our Lady's Ringwood

=== Secondary schools ===
- Aquinas College
- Norwood Secondary College
- Ringwood Secondary College
- Yarra Valley Grammar

Southwood Boys' Grammar School (Site closed in 2013 and merged with Tintern Grammar in Ringwood East)

== Politics ==
In 2010, Ringwood operated a number of polling booths at the 2010 federal election, distributed mostly across the federal electorates of Deakin and Menzies, with another few allocated to Casey for pre-polling. Traditionally a relatively Liberal-leaning suburb, the combined results across all Ringwood booths produced a primary vote result of 35.7% for Labor, 47.2% for the Liberals and 12.0% for the Greens; on a two-party basis after preferences, the result was 53.02% Liberal and 46.98% Labor.

Ringwood operated a number of polling booths at the 2013 federal election, distributed mostly across the federal electorates of Deakin and Menzies. In a Liberal gain, the electorate that covers most of Ringwood, Deakin, elected Michael Sukkar with a 3.8% swing and 53.2% of the votes. In the 2016 federal election, Deakin, reelected Michael Sukkar with 55.7% of votes, and a swing of +2.5%. At the 2019 federal election, Sukkar was reelected again for Deakin with 54.7% of votes despite a swing of -1.6 against him.

For Menzies, the 2013 election saw Kevin Andrews win with 64.4% of the votes, and again in 2016 with 60.6% of the votes. He won it for a 3rd time in 2019 with 57.5% of the vote.

== Sport ==
The suburb has three Australian rules football teams. The first is the Norwood Norsemen, who are the current Division 1 Eastern Football League (EFL) premiers, whose home ground is Mullum Reserve. The second team is the Ringwood Redbacks who play in Division 3 of the EFL, at Jubilee Park. The third is the Ringwood Jets, who play in the SFL. Their home ground is at Aquinas College.

Ringwood is also the home to Ringwood City Soccer Club. Founded in 1953, the club became the Victorian State League champions in 1959. However, the club has seen very limited success since and they now play in the Victorian State League Division 5;. The club is based at the Ringwood City Soccer Complex located at Jubilee Park.

Ringwood is also home to Ringwood Basketball Association, with the Hawks playing in the NBL1 South. The club plays out of the Maroondah Indoor Sports Centre.

Other sporting facilities include:

- Maroondah Indoor Sports Centre
- Ringwood Public Golf Course
- Proclamation Park
- Jubilee Park
- Action Indoor Sports Centre (hosting indoor soccer, cricket, beach volleyball and netball)
- Aquanation Ringwood Regional Aquatic and Leisure Centre (opened Monday 17 August 2015)

== Recreation ==
The Ringwood Field Naturalists Club Inc. (RFNC) is an Australian natural history and conservation organisation. The club was founded in 1961 by Jack Hyett and William (Bill) King, with other notable members, including Bruce A. Fuhrer and Fred Rogers.

The club provides an amateur forum for the study and enjoyment of natural history and travels both locally and within Victoria.

The club logo was designed in 1964 by Jack Truscott, a local artist and Foundation member and features a male golden whistler and the cinnamon wattle (Acacia leprosa), both of which were common in Ringwood in the 1960s.

== Transport ==
=== Road ===
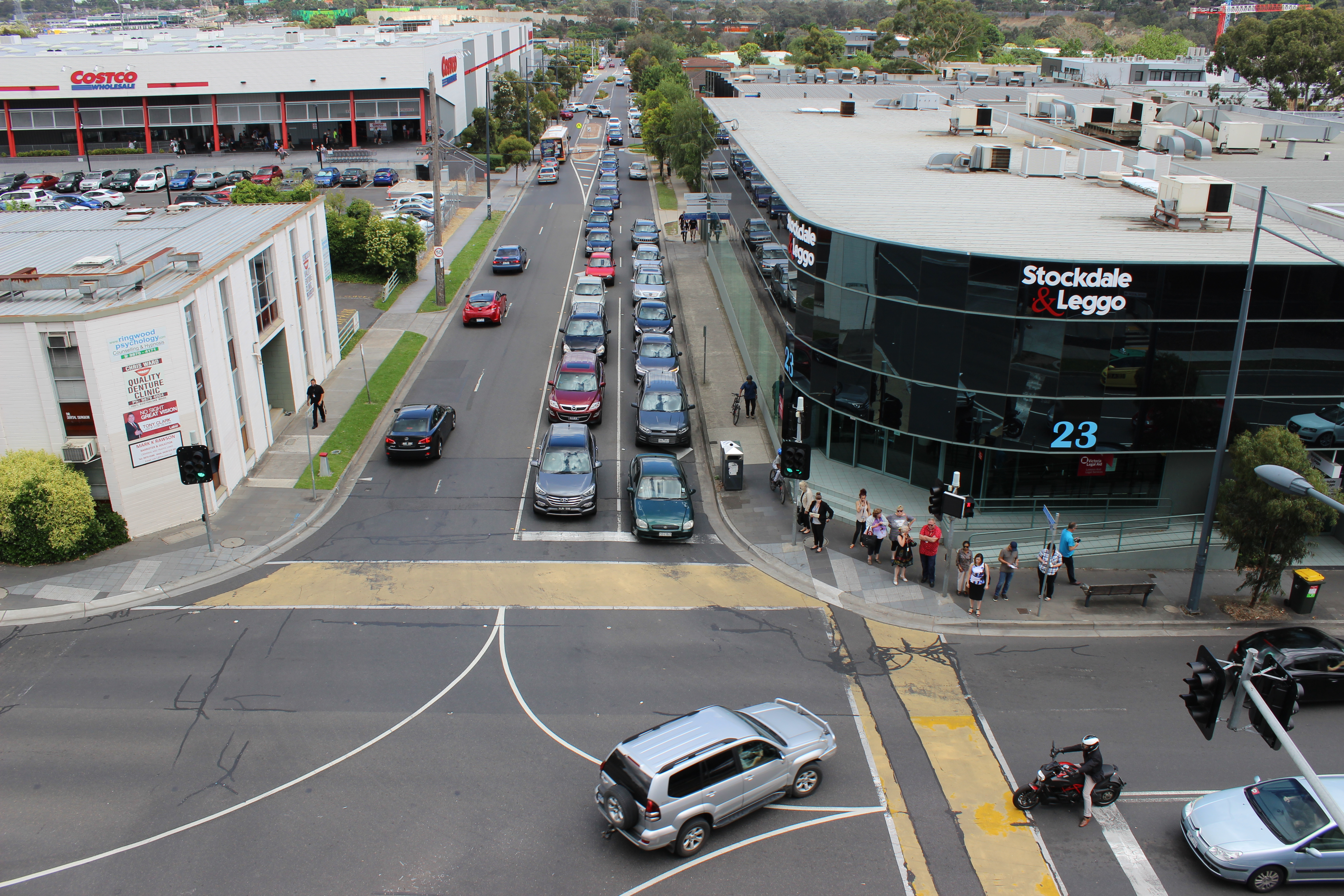
Intersection of Bond Street and Ringwood Street with pedestrians and cars waiting to cross. December 2017.

Ringwood is accessible by many major roads and thoroughfares.

Some north-south arterials (from east–west) are as follows;

- Heatherdale Road
- EastLink
- New Street
- Ringwood Street/Wantirna Road
- Great Ryrie Street
- Warrandyte Road
- Kalinda Road

Some east-west arterials (from north–south) are as follows;

- Oban Road
- Ringwood Bypass
- Maroondah Highway
- Bedford Road
- Molan Street
- Reilly Street
- Canterbury Road

=== Train ===
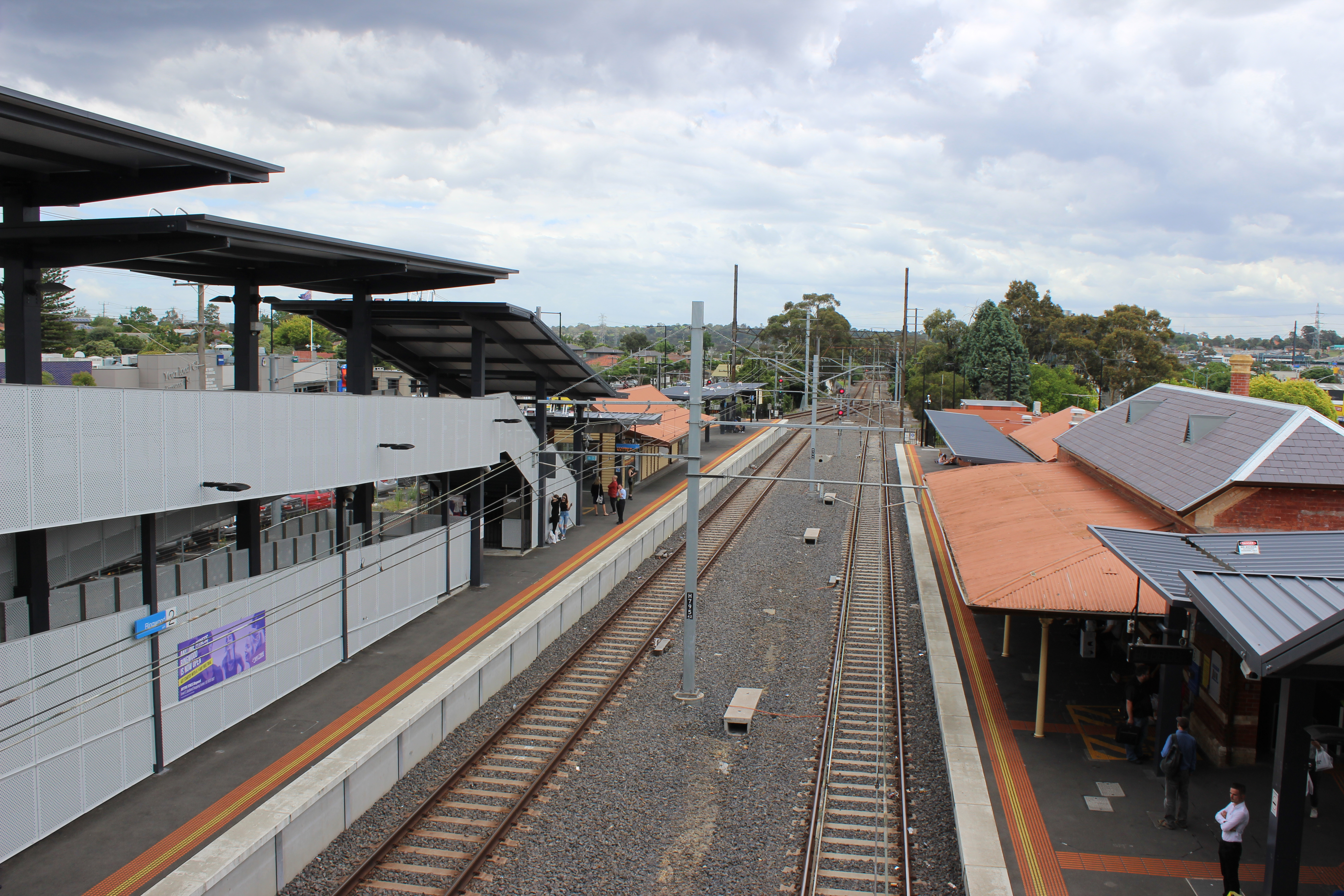
Platforms at Ringwood Railway Station. December 2017.

Two train stations serve Ringwood, both of which being on the Belgrave and Lilydale lines. The first is Heatherdale in the west near Heatherdale Road, with the other being Ringwood near Maroondah Highway between Ringwood Street and Warrandyte Road.

=== Bus ===
Many bus routes terminate at or pass through both Ringwood and Heatherdale stations, as well as serving other areas of the suburb.

== Places of interest ==
Ringwood includes notable places such as:

- Ringwood Magistrates' Court
- Eastland Shopping Centre
- Ringwood Railway Station
- Ringwood Clock Tower
- Realm (Ringwood Library)

== Places of worship ==
- Ringwood Christadelphians
- Norwood Dawn Christadelphians
- Holy Spirit Catholic Church
- St. Paul's Anglican Church
- Ringwood Uniting Church
- First Church of Christ, Scientist, Ringwood
- Ringwood Church of Christ

== Notable people ==
- Stan Beal - Australian rules footballer
- Arthur Bickerton - politician
- Adrian Campbell - Australian rules footballer
- John Robertson Duigan - aviator
- Will Fowles - politician
- Miriam Knee - cricketer
- Gordon Lindsay - Australian rules footballer
- Joshua Simmonds - field hockey player
- Billy Snedden - politician
- Michael Sukkar - politician
- Shurlee Swain - historian and author
- Enos Thomas - Australian rules footballer

== Sister cities ==
- Ringwood, Hampshire, England

In the Silver Jubilee year of 1977 the city of Ringwood, Victoria approached Ringwood Town Council in Hampshire, and subsequently became the Hampshire town's second sister town. Visits were later exchanged and correspondence ensued.

== Gallery ==
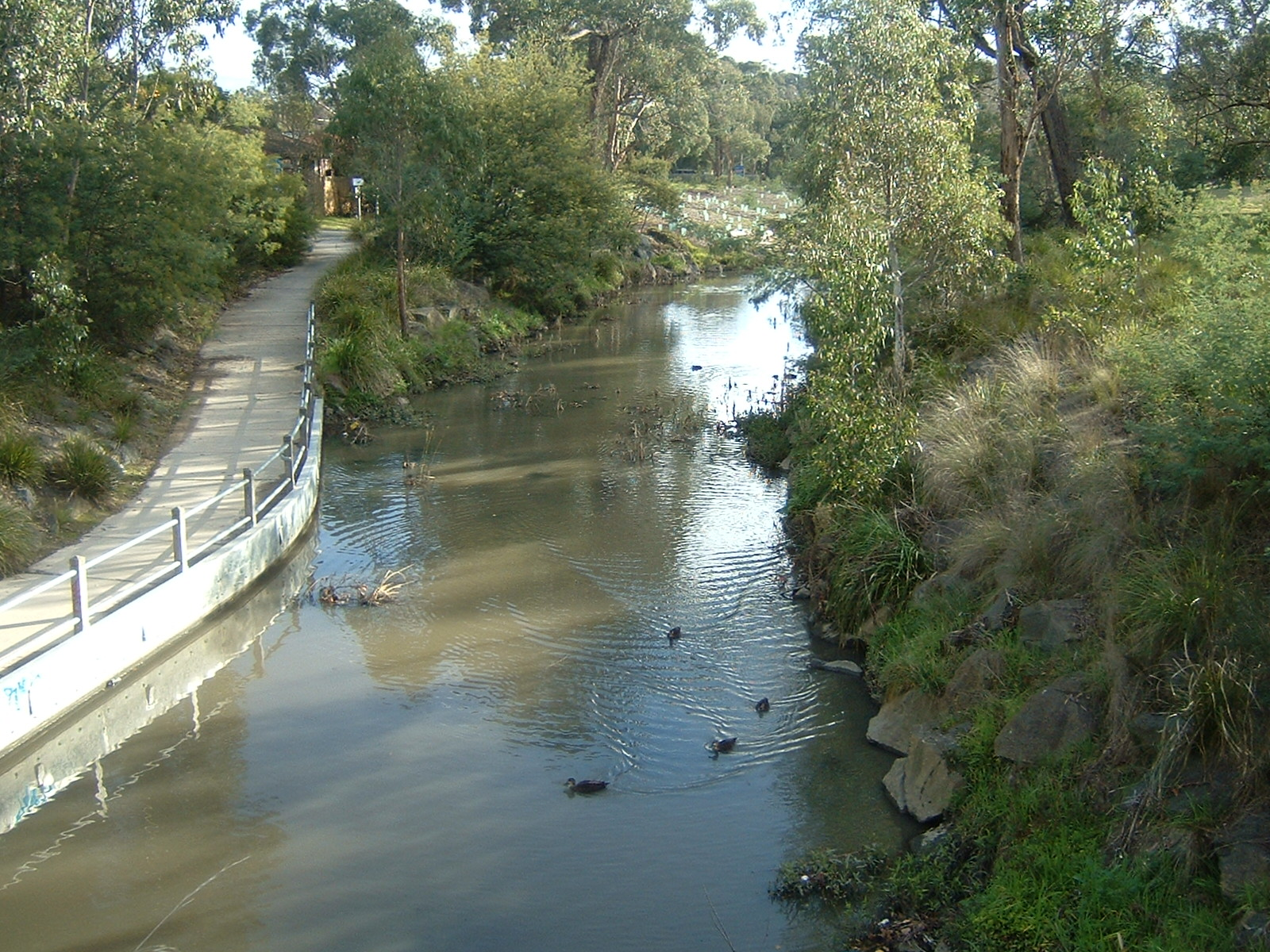
Mullum Mullum Creek

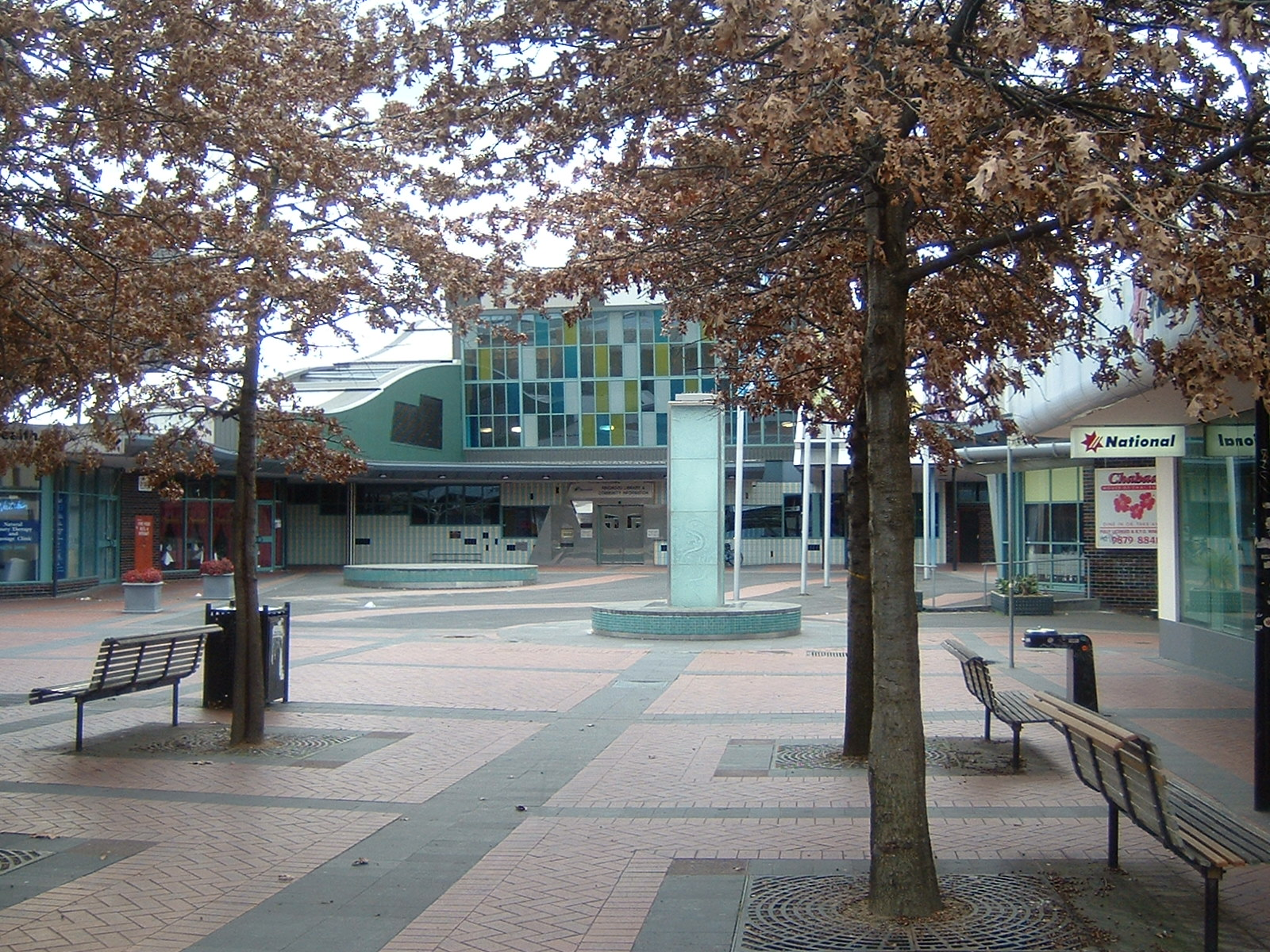
Ringwood Library pre move

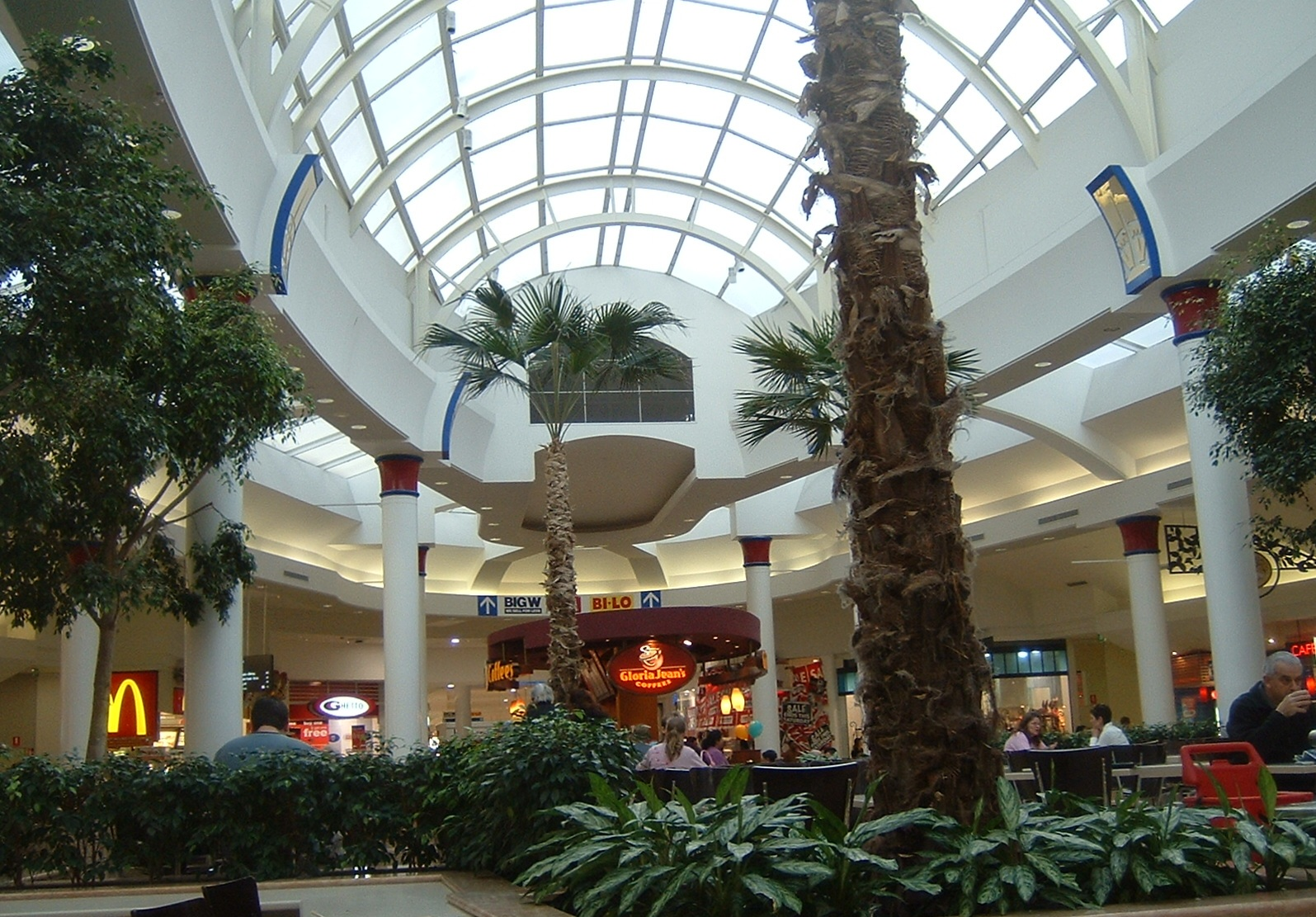
Eastland. Food court

== See also ==
- City of Ringwood – Ringwood was previously within this former local government area.
- Ringwood, Hampshire - A town in Hampshire, England.
