= Stan Beal =

Australian rules footballer (1924–2017)

Personal information
- Full name: Stanley Beal
- Born: 5 April 1924; Ringwood, Victoria
- Died: 2 April 2017 (aged 92); Victoria
- Original team: Ringwood
- Height: 185 cm (6 ft 1 in)
- Weight: 75 kg (165 lb)

Playing career^{1}
Years	Club	Games (Goals)
1952–53	Footscray	7 (0)
- ^{1} Playing statistics correct to the end of 1953.

Stanley Beal (5 April 1924 – 2 April 2017) was an Australian rules footballer who played with Footscray in the Victorian Football League (VFL).

Beal served as a gunner in the Australian Army during World War II, seeing active service in Papua New Guinea.
