= Gordon Lindsay (footballer) =

Australian rules footballer, born 1911

Personal information
- Full name: Gordon Andrew Lindsay
- Born: 1 May 1911; Ringwood, Victoria
- Died: 11 November 1967 (aged 56); Box Hill, Victoria
- Original team: Ringwood

Playing career^{1}
Years	Club	Games (Goals)
1931	Melbourne	1 (0)
- ^{1} Playing statistics correct to the end of 1931.

Gordon Andrew Lindsay (1 May 1911 – 11 November 1967) was an Australian rules footballer who played for Melbourne in the Victorian Football League (VFL).

== Family ==
The son of Andrew Lindsay (1884–1954), and Margaret Mary Lindsay (1889–1912), née McEwan, Gordon Andrew Lindsay was born at Ringwood, Victoria on 1 May 1911.

He married Kathleen Veronica Barron (1914–) in 1938.

== Death ==
He died at Box Hill Hospital on 11 November 1967.
