= Ringwood Bypass =

Highway in Melbourne, Australia

Ringwood Bypass Victoria
- Coordinates: 37.813327°S 145.215597°E (West end); 37.811053°S 145.237442°E (East end)

General information
- Type: Highway
- Length: 2 km (1.2 mi)
- Opened: 1996–2008
- Route number(s): Metro Route 62 (2008–present)

Major junctions
- West end: EastLink; Ringwood, Melbourne
- Warrandyte Road; Maroondah Highway
- East end: Mount Dandenong Road; Ringwood, Melbourne

Highway system
- Highways in Australia; National Highway • Freeways in Australia; Highways in Victoria

The Ringwood Bypass is a short stretch of road extending from EastLink to Maroondah Highway in Melbourne, Australia. It allows the Maroondah Highway to bypass Eastland Shopping Centre, in the eastern Melbourne suburb of Ringwood.

== Route ==
The bypass begins at the intersection with EastLink – with access to the Maroondah Highway west of Ringwood extended south from Eastlink's ramps – and heads east as an 8-lane, dual-carriageway road, adjacent to Mullum Mullum Creek, crossing Ringwood Street and Warrandyte Road, before ending at the intersection with the Maroondah Highway east of Ringwood and Mount Dandenong Road. The speed limit is 80 kilometres per hour (50 mph).

== History ==
The first stage of the road began construction in January 1995 and opened in September 1996, starting at Mount Dandenong Road and heading west to Ringwood Street. An extension to the bypass to connect it to the Eastern Freeway at Springvale Road in Donvale was planned in October 2000: this would include tunnels 1.5 km in length and a connection with the planned Scoresby Freeway (later EastLink), cost $326 million, and was scheduled for completion in mid-2005. Instead, the Scoresby Freeway and the planned Eastern Freeway extension was merged into the Eastlink project, with the western half of the Ringwood Bypass connecting directly to it just south of the tunnel portals: this section opened with EastLink in July 2008. In 2003 there was controversy about whether the bypass would be tolled, with the State Government making assurances that it would not be.

The bypass was signed as Metropolitan Route 62 along its entire length when the second stage opened at the same time as EastLink in 2008.

The passing of the Road Management Act 2004 granted the responsibility of overall management and development of Victoria's major arterial roads to VicRoads: in 2004, VicRoads re-declared the road as Ringwood Bypass (Arterial #6270), beginning at Ringwood Street and ending at Maroondah Highway through Ringwood; the road west of Ringwood Street connects to EastLink, a private tollway not under the jurisdiction of VicRoads.

== Major intersections ==
The entire bypass lies within the City of Maroondah local government area.

Location	km	mi	Destinations	Notes
Ringwood	0.0	0.0	EastLink (M3) – Clifton Hill, Dandenong, Frankston	Western terminus of bypass and Metro Route 62 at semi-directional T interchange
Ringwood	0.0	0.0	Maroondah Highway (Metro Route 34) – Nunawading, Box Hill	
Ringwood	1.1	0.68	Ringwood Street	Traffic light intersection
Ringwood	1.4	0.87	Warrandyte Road (Metro Route 9) – Warrandyte, Wantirna	Traffic light intersection
Ringwood	2.0	1.2	Maroondah Highway (Metro Route 34) – Lilydale, Yarra Glen, Healesville	Traffic light intersection
Ringwood	2.0	1.2	Mount Dandenong Road (Metro Route 62 east) – Croydon, Mount Dandenong	Eastern terminus of bypass, Metro Route 62 continues east along Mount Dandenong Road
1.000 mi = 1.609 km; 1.000 km = 0.621 mi: Route transition
