= Electoral results for the district of Warrandyte =

Victoria, Australia, district election results

This is a list of electoral results for the Electoral district of Warrandyte in Victorian state elections.

== Members for Warrandyte ==
Member	Party	Term
Norman Lacy	Liberal	1976–1982
Lou Hill	Labor	1982–1988
Phil Honeywood	Liberal	1988–2006
Ryan Smith	Liberal	2006–2023
Nicole Werner	Liberal	2023–present

== Election results ==
=== Elections in the 2020s ===
==== 2023 by-election ====
2023 Warrandyte state by-election
Party	Candidate	Votes	%	±%
Liberal	Nicole Werner	21,921	57.3	+9.9
Greens	Tomas Lightbody	7,130	18.6	+6.9
Democratic Labour	Cary de Wit	2,204	5.8	+5.8
Independent	Maya Tesa	1,556	4.1	+4.1
Victorian Socialists	Colleen Bolger	1,459	3.8	+3.8
Family First	Richard Griffith-Jones	1,073	2.8	−1.2
Sustainable Australia	Jack Corcoran	1,030	2.7	+2.7
Freedom	Greg Cheesman	846	2.2	+2.2
Independent	Wai Man Raymond Chow	694	1.8	+1.8
Independent	Morgan Ranieri	168	0.4	+0.4
Independent	Alan Max Menadue	121	0.3	+0.3
Independent	Philip Jenkins	77	0.2	+0.2
Total formal votes		38,279	94.2	−2.4
Informal votes		2,344	5.8	+2.4
Turnout		40,623	79.7	−11.9
Two-candidate-preferred result
Liberal	Nicole Werner	27,334	71.0	+16.7
Greens	Tomas Lightbody	11,172	29.0	+29.0
Liberal hold				

==== 2022 ====
2022 Victorian state election: Warrandyte
Party	Candidate	Votes	%	±%
Liberal	Ryan Smith	21,344	47.3	−2.8
Labor	Naomi Oakley	14,946	33.2	−2.3
Greens	Deepak Joshi	5,283	11.7	+1.1
Family First	Richard Vernay	1,823	4.0	+4.0
Animal Justice	Nicola Rae	1,020	2.3	−1.5
Independent	Cynthia Pilli	659	1.5	+1.5
Total formal votes		45,075	96.6	+1.5
Informal votes		1,582	3.4	−1.5
Turnout		46,657	91.6	+1.1
Two-party-preferred result
Liberal	Ryan Smith	24,482	54.3	+0.5
Labor	Naomi Oakley	20,593	45.7	−0.5
Liberal hold		Swing	+0.5	

=== Elections in the 2010s ===
==== 2018 ====
2018 Victorian state election: Warrandyte
Party	Candidate	Votes	%	±%
Liberal	Ryan Smith	18,852	49.76	−7.13
Labor	Elizabeth McGrath	13,395	35.36	+6.14
Greens	Ben Ramcharan	3,927	10.37	−0.07
Animal Justice	Lachlan McGill	1,710	4.51	+4.51
Total formal votes		37,884	95.20	−0.07
Informal votes		1,909	4.80	+0.07
Turnout		39,793	91.94	−2.35
Two-party-preferred result
Liberal	Ryan Smith	20,402	53.88	−7.72
Labor	Elizabeth McGrath	17,464	46.12	+7.72
Liberal hold		Swing	−7.72	

==== 2014 ====
2014 Victorian state election: Warrandyte
Party	Candidate	Votes	%	±%
Liberal	Ryan Smith	21,982	56.9	−5.4
Labor	Steven Kent	11,289	29.2	+4.7
Greens	Richard Cranston	4,032	10.4	+0.7
Christians	David Leach	887	2.3	+2.3
Country Alliance	Keith Lyon	446	1.2	+1.1
Total formal votes		38,636	95.3	−0.6
Informal votes		1,916	4.7	+0.6
Turnout		40,552	94.3	−0.0
Two-party-preferred result
Liberal	Ryan Smith	23,804	61.6	−5.6
Labor	Steven Kent	14,840	38.4	+5.6
Liberal hold		Swing	−5.6	

==== 2010 ====
2010 Victorian state election: Warrandyte
Party	Candidate	Votes	%	±%
Liberal	Ryan Smith	22,150	58.53	+7.73
Labor	Meghan Hopper	9,920	26.21	−2.98
Greens	Chris Padgham	4,221	11.15	−3.19
Family First	Yasmin De Zilwa	1,106	2.92	−2.75
Independent	Paul Slattery	446	1.18	+1.18
Total formal votes		37,843	96.31	−0.39
Informal votes		1,448	3.69	+0.39
Turnout		39,291	94.74	+0.61
Two-party-preferred result
Liberal	Ryan Smith	24,176	63.87	+4.88
Labor	Meghan Hopper	13,675	36.13	−4.88
Liberal hold		Swing	+4.88	

=== Elections in the 2000s ===
==== 2006 ====
2006 Victorian state election: Warrandyte
Party	Candidate	Votes	%	±%
Liberal	Ryan Smith	18,309	50.8	−1.6
Labor	Jarrod Panther	10,519	29.2	−5.8
Greens	David Ellis	5,169	14.3	+4.3
Family First	Paul Bronte	2,042	5.7	+5.7
Total formal votes		36,039	96.7	−0.9
Informal votes		1,228	3.3	+0.9
Turnout		37,267	94.1	
Two-party-preferred result
Liberal	Ryan Smith	21,244	59.0	+2.7
Labor	Jarrod Panther	14,767	41.0	−2.7
Liberal hold		Swing	+2.7	

==== 2002 ====
2002 Victorian state election: Warrandyte
Party	Candidate	Votes	%	±%
Liberal	Phil Honeywood	18,742	52.4	−9.5
Labor	Jarrod Panther	12,529	35.0	+1.4
Greens	Barry Watson	3,570	10.0	+10.0
Hope	Tim Petherbridge	914	2.6	−1.2
Total formal votes		35,755	97.6	−0.5
Informal votes		879	2.4	+0.5
Turnout		36,634	93.8	
Two-party-preferred result
Liberal	Phil Honeywood	20,145	56.3	−7.5
Labor	Jarrod Panther	15,605	43.7	+7.5
Liberal hold		Swing	−7.5	

=== Elections in the 1990s ===
==== 1999 ====
1999 Victorian state election: Warrandyte
Party	Candidate	Votes	%	±%
Liberal	Phil Honeywood	19,395	61.2	−0.2
Labor	David Orr	10,630	33.6	+3.2
Hope	Kate Stockdale	1,357	4.3	+4.3
Natural Law	Patti Roberts	288	0.9	−0.3
Total formal votes		31,670	98.1	−0.4
Informal votes		620	1.9	+0.4
Turnout		32,290	93.9	
Two-party-preferred result
Liberal	Phil Honeywood	20,096	63.5	−0.4
Labor	David Orr	11,571	36.5	+0.4
Liberal hold		Swing	−0.4	

==== 1996 ====
1996 Victorian state election: Warrandyte
Party	Candidate	Votes	%	±%
Liberal	Phil Honeywood	18,820	61.5	−1.9
Labor	Jenny Stray	9,310	30.4	+3.6
Independent	Louise Joy	2,123	6.9	+6.9
Natural Law	Juliana Kendi	371	1.2	+1.2
Total formal votes		30,624	98.5	+0.8
Informal votes		473	1.5	−0.8
Turnout		31,097	95.8	
Two-party-preferred result
Liberal	Phil Honeywood	19,549	63.9	−2.8
Labor	Jenny Stray	11,025	36.1	+2.8
Liberal hold		Swing	−2.8	

==== 1992 ====
1992 Victorian state election: Warrandyte
Party	Candidate	Votes	%	±%
Liberal	Phil Honeywood	18,108	63.3	+15.5
Labor	Philip Moran	7,664	26.8	−16.2
Independent	Neil Macdonald	2,828	9.9	+9.9
Total formal votes		28,600	97.7	+0.3
Informal votes		677	2.3	−0.3
Turnout		29,277	95.8	
Two-party-preferred result
Liberal	Phil Honeywood	19,041	66.7	+14.7
Labor	Philip Moran	9,491	33.3	−14.7
Liberal hold		Swing	+14.7	

=== Elections in the 1980s ===
==== 1988 ====
1988 Victorian state election: Warrandyte
Party	Candidate	Votes	%	±%
Liberal	Phil Honeywood	14,268	47.22	+0.79
Labor	Lou Hill	13,007	43.04	−5.70
Democrats	David Ball	1,391	4.60	+4.60
Call to Australia	Nelleke Arnold	820	2.71	+2.71
Independent	Harold Collins	375	1.24	+1.24
Independent	Joy Lane	358	1.18	+1.18
Total formal votes		30,219	97.25	−0.95
Informal votes		854	2.75	+0.95
Turnout		31,073	93.93	−0.46
Two-party-preferred result
Liberal	Phil Honeywood	15,555	51.49	+1.65
Labor	Lou Hill	14,655	48.51	−1.65
Liberal gain from Labor		Swing	+1.65	

==== 1985 ====
1985 Victorian state election: Warrandyte
Party	Candidate	Votes	%	±%
Labor	Lou Hill	12,879	48.7	+3.1
Liberal	Gracia Baylor	12,270	46.4	+4.8
Independent	Timothy Connellan	1,275	4.8	+4.8
Total formal votes		26,424	98.2	
Informal votes		483	1.8	
Turnout		26,907	94.4	
Two-party-preferred result
Labor	Lou Hill	13,254	50.2	−4.5
Liberal	Gracia Baylor	13,167	49.8	+4.5
Labor hold		Swing	−4.5	

==== 1982 ====
1982 Victorian state election: Warrandyte
Party	Candidate	Votes	%	±%
Labor	Lou Hill	14,697	44.1	+6.7
Liberal	Norman Lacy	14,444	43.3	−6.2
Democrats	Lynette Bartold	2,636	7.9	−4.5
Democratic Labor	Peter Ferwerda	842	2.5	+2.5
Independent	Diane Teasdale	716	2.2	+2.2
Total formal votes		33,335	98.3	0.0
Informal votes		569	1.7	0.0
Turnout		33,904	94.5	+0.6
Two-party-preferred result
Labor	Lou Hill	17,349	52.0	+8.1
Liberal	Norman Lacy	15,986	48.0	−8.1
Labor gain from Liberal		Swing	+8.1	

=== Elections in the 1970s ===
==== 1979 ====
1979 Victorian state election: Warrandyte
Party	Candidate	Votes	%	±%
Liberal	Norman Lacy	14,644	49.5	−11.1
Labor	Richard Davies	11,057	37.4	−2.0
Democrats	Robyn Barker	3,669	12.4	+12.4
Independent	Dulcie Bethune	203	0.7	+0.7
Total formal votes		29,573	98.3	+0.4
Informal votes		522	1.7	−0.4
Turnout		30,095	93.9	+0.7
Two-party-preferred result
Liberal	Norman Lacy	16,586	56.1	−4.5
Labor	Richard Davies	12,987	43.9	+4.5
Liberal hold		Swing	−4.5	

==== 1976 ====
1976 Victorian state election: Warrandyte
Party	Candidate	Votes	%	±%
Liberal	Norman Lacy	16,235	60.6	+8.4
Labor	Frederick Davis	10,553	39.4	+2.4
Total formal votes		26,788	97.9	
Informal votes		583	2.1	
Turnout		27,371	93.2	
Liberal hold		Swing	+1.6	
