= 2023 Warrandyte state by-election =

- 26 August 2023

Electoral district of Warrandyte in the Victorian Legislative Assembly
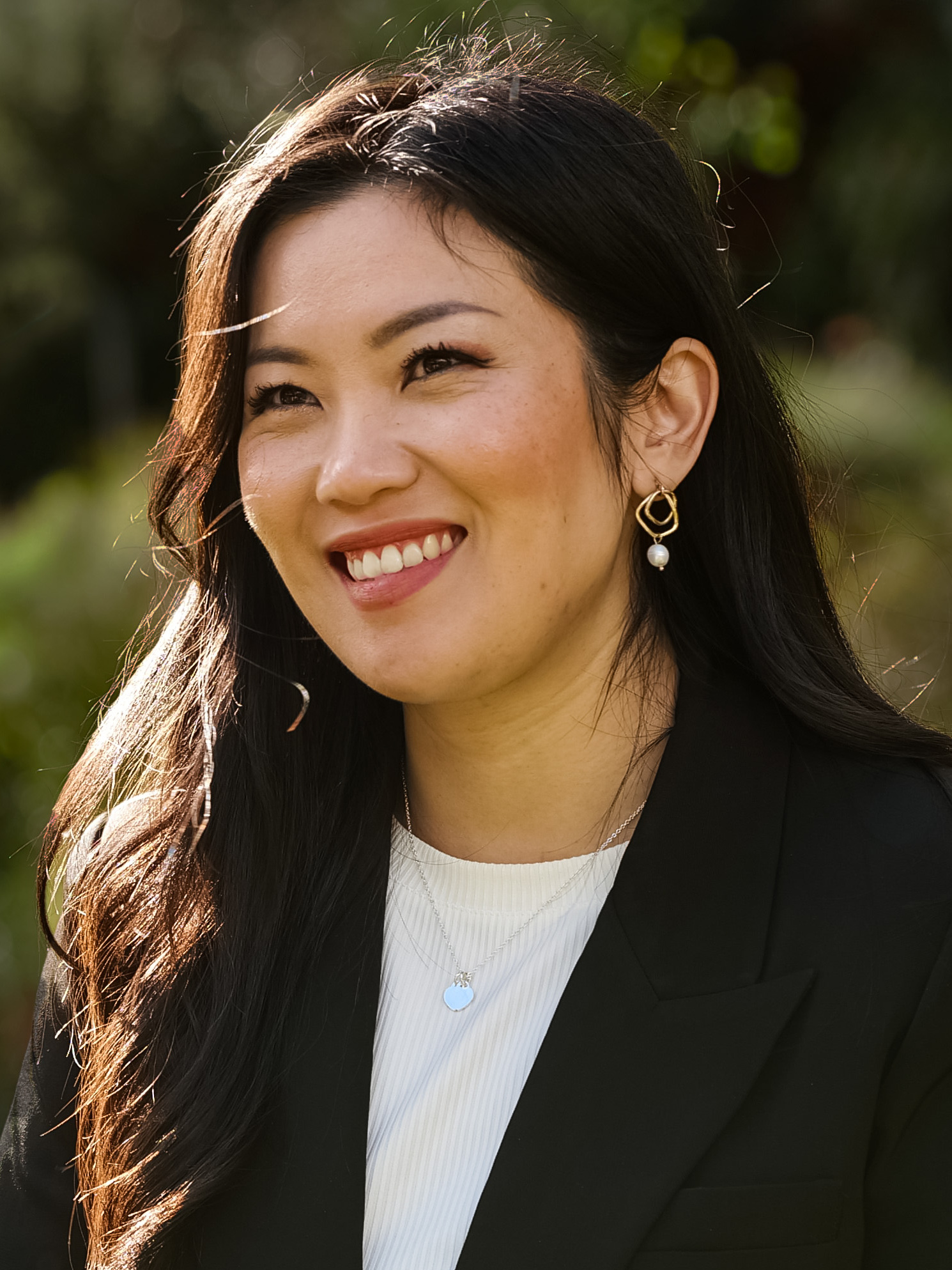

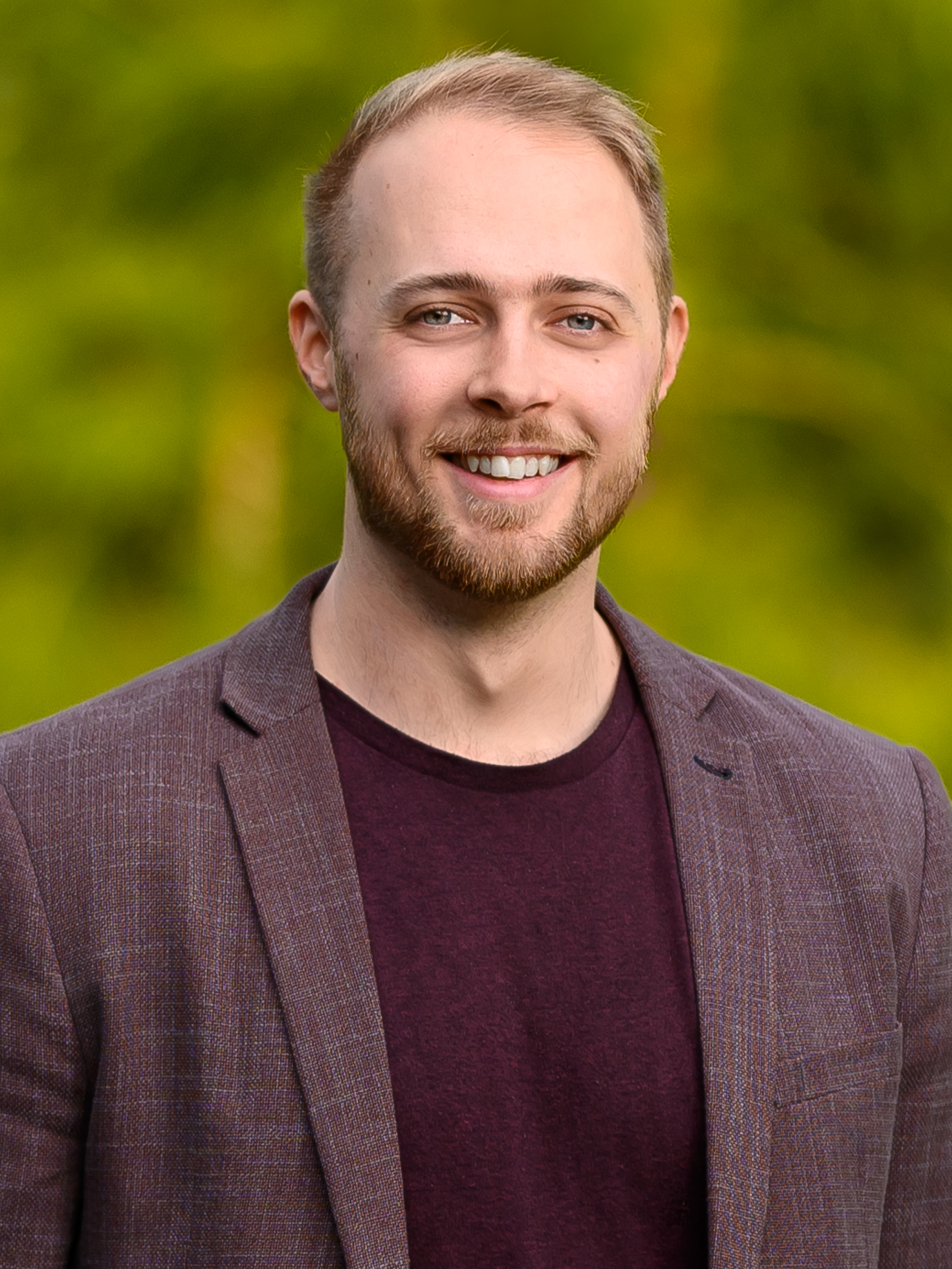
	First party	Second party
Candidate	Nicole Werner	Tomas Lightbody
Party	Liberal	Greens
Popular vote	21,026	6,798
Percentage	57.4%	18.6%
Swing	▲10.0	▲6.8
TCP	71.1%	28.9%
TCP swing	▲16.8	▲28.9
- Location of the electoral district of Warrandyte, in Melbourne's outer eastern suburbs
MP before election
Ryan Smith
Liberal
Elected MP
Nicole Werner
Liberal

The 2023 Warrandyte state by-election was held on 26 August 2023 to elect the next member for Warrandyte in the Victorian Legislative Assembly, following the resignation of Liberal MP Ryan Smith.

== Background ==
The electoral district of Warrandyte was established in 1976 and has consistently been a safe seat for the Liberal Party except from 1982 to 1988 when it was held by Lou Hill of the Labor Party. According the 2021 Census, Warrandyte's median age is 43 with a weekly median household income of $2,134 while more than 37% of residents attaining a bachelor's degree or higher. The district is characterised by the southern banks of the Yarra River, rolling hills, lush greenery, and pockets of bushland.

=== Resignation of Ryan Smith ===
Ryan Smith was first elected at the 2006 Victorian state election, replacing long-serving member Phil Honeywood who had held the seat since the 1988 election. Smith would continue to keep Warrandyte as a safe Liberal seat barring the 2018 and 2022 elections where it became marginal following the successes of the Australian Labor Party. Smith retained the seat at the 2022 election with a two-party-preferred vote of 54.2%, a slight swing from the previous election where there was a swing of over 7 per cent against him. Following the election of John Pesutto as leader, he was dropped from the shadow cabinet, having been a shadow minister under Matthew Guy and Michael O'Brien.

Smith announced his retirement in May 2023 after 16 years in parliament, with effect from 7 July. Smith did not tell leader John Pesutto of his resignation, with Pesutto instead learning about it through the media. He said that he had “become increasingly uncomfortable with the growing negative tone of politics, both internally and more broadly,” generally interpreted as Smith’s disquiet over Pesutto’s handling of the Moira Deeming-related leadership tensions that embroiled the Victorian Liberal Party in early and mid-2023.

== Candidates ==
Candidates are listed in the order they will appear on the ballot.

=== Nominated candidates ===
Party	Candidate	Background
Sustainable Australia	Jack Corcoran	Aged care volunteer and candidate for North-Eastern Metropolitan at the 2022 state election
Liberal	Nicole Werner	Pentecostal youth pastor and candidate for Box Hill at the 2022 state election
Freedom	Greg Cheesman	Businessman and candidate for North-Eastern Metropolitan at the 2022 state election
Democratic Labour	Cary De Wit	Roofing company manager and candidate for North-Eastern Metropolitan at the 2022 state election
Independent	Wai Man Raymond Chow	Mathematician and radio broadcaster
Independent	Morgan Ranieri	Businessman
Victorian Socialists	Colleen Bolger	Attorney, trade unionist and candidate for Melbourne at the 2022 state election
Family First	Richard Griffith-Jones	Hotelier, anti-gender movement activist and candidate for Ringwood at the 2022 state election
Independent	Philip Jenkins	
Independent	Maya Tesa	Businesswoman; candidate at the 2023 Aston federal by-election and Liberal Democratic candidate for North-Eastern Metropolitan at the 2022 state election
Greens	Tomas Lightbody	Deputy Mayor of Manningham
Independent	Alan Max Menadue	Defence contractor, candidate for Prahran at the 2022 state election

=== Liberal ===
The Liberal Party preselected Nicole Werner to run in the by-election. Werner stood as a candidate for Box Hill in 2022.

Nicole is a former Pentecostal youth pastor and charity business developer.

Eight other candidates also nominated for the Liberal Party preselection, including:

- Andrew Conlon, councillor for the City of Manningham
- Antonietta di Cosmo, electorate officer for Smith
- David Farrelly, candidate for Pakenham in 2022
- Maxwell Gratton, candidate for Ivanhoe in 2006
- Jason McClintock, candidate for Eltham in 2022
- Sarah Overton, a director for professional services firm KPMG
- John Roskam, former executive director of the Institute of Public Affairs
- Jemma Townson, former electorate officer for Katie Allen and Matthew Guy
- Allison Troth, former electorate officer for John Howard

There was also speculation that Tim Smith, the former MP for Kew would stand for preselection but no nominations were received on the cutoff date of 7 June 2023. Other speculated candidates for included 2022 candidates Lucas Moon (Richmond) and Cynthia Watson (Ringwood) as well as Caroline Inge, federal vice-president of the Liberal Party.

=== Labor ===
On 26 July 2023, it was reported that the Victorian Labor Party would not contest the by-election to instead focus their resources for the 2026 Victorian state election. In the 2022 state election, the Labor Party ran Naomi Oakley who received 33.16% of the primary vote.

=== Greens ===
Tomas Lightbody is running as the Greens' candidate in the by-election. Lightbody was elected to Manningham City Council at the age of 22 and has since been elected as Deputy Mayor of Manningham council.

=== Other ===
Maya Tesa stood as an independent. She has previously run in the Aston federal by-election where she received 7% of the primary vote and as a candidate for the LDP in Jagajaga and the North-Eastern Metropolitan Region in 2022.

Victorian Socialists candidate Colleen Bolger is calling for a rent freeze. Greg Cheesman is running with the Freedom Party of Victoria.

Family First Party candidate Richard Griffith-Jones has promised to introduce if elected legislation to ban drag queen storytime in public venues.

Raymond Hoser, a Snake Catcher and Whistleblower, announced his intention to run as an independent candidate, however this did not materialise.

=== Historical two-party-preferred vote ===
Two-party-preferred vote in Warrandyte, 1996–2022
Election	1996	1999	2002	2006	2010	2014	2018	2022
Liberal	63.90%	63.50%	56.30%	59.00%	63.87%	61.60%	53.88%	54.20%
Labor	36.10%	36.50%	43.70%	41.00%	36.13%	38.40%	46.12%	45.80%
Government	L/NP	ALP	ALP	ALP	L/NP	ALP	ALP	ALP

=== Previous election results ===
2022 Victorian state election: Warrandyte
Party	Candidate	Votes	%	±%
Liberal	Ryan Smith	21,344	47.3	−2.8
Labor	Naomi Oakley	14,946	33.2	−2.3
Greens	Deepak Joshi	5,283	11.7	+1.1
Family First	Richard Vernay	1,823	4.0	+4.0
Animal Justice	Nicola Rae	1,020	2.3	−1.5
Independent	Cynthia Pilli	659	1.5	+1.5
Total formal votes		45,075	96.6	+1.5
Informal votes		1,582	3.4	−1.5
Turnout		46,657	91.6	+1.1
Two-party-preferred result
Liberal	Ryan Smith	24,482	54.3	+0.5
Labor	Naomi Oakley	20,593	45.7	−0.5
Liberal hold		Swing	+0.5	

== Results ==
2023 Warrandyte state by-election
Party	Candidate	Votes	%	±%
Liberal	Nicole Werner	21,921	57.3	+9.9
Greens	Tomas Lightbody	7,130	18.6	+6.9
Democratic Labour	Cary de Wit	2,204	5.8	+5.8
Independent	Maya Tesa	1,556	4.1	+4.1
Victorian Socialists	Colleen Bolger	1,459	3.8	+3.8
Family First	Richard Griffith-Jones	1,073	2.8	−1.2
Sustainable Australia	Jack Corcoran	1,030	2.7	+2.7
Freedom	Greg Cheesman	846	2.2	+2.2
Independent	Wai Man Raymond Chow	694	1.8	+1.8
Independent	Morgan Ranieri	168	0.4	+0.4
Independent	Alan Max Menadue	121	0.3	+0.3
Independent	Philip Jenkins	77	0.2	+0.2
Total formal votes		38,279	94.2	−2.4
Informal votes		2,344	5.8	+2.4
Turnout		40,623	79.7	−11.9
Two-candidate-preferred result
Liberal	Nicole Werner	27,334	71.0	+16.7
Greens	Tomas Lightbody	11,172	29.0	+29.0
Liberal hold				
