= Shelley O'Donnell =

Australia netball international

Shelley O'Donnell OAM
Personal information
- Full name: Shelley Maree O'Donnell
- Born: 18 April 1967 (age 59) Victoria, Australia
- Height: 172 cm (5 ft 8 in)
- Children: Hannah Mundy; Jasper Mundy
- Relatives: Rankin family Graeme O'Donnell (father); Gary O'Donnell (brother)
- School: Norwood Secondary College

Netball career
- Playing positions: WA, C
Years	Club team	Apps
1987–1988	Australian Institute of Sport	
1989	Melbourne/Doncaster Keas	
1990	Melbourne City	
1993	Contax	
1994	Melbourne Keas	
1996	Australian Institute of Sport	
1997–2005	Melbourne Kestrels	
Years	National team	Caps
1990–1999	Australia	84
Medal record
Representing Australia
Commonwealth Games
Gold medal – first place	1998 Kuala Lumpur	Team
World Netball Championships
Gold medal – first place	1991 Sydney	Team
Gold medal – first place	1995 Birmingham	Team
Gold medal – first place	1999 Christchurch	Team
World Games
Gold medal – first place	1993 The Hague	Team

Shelley O'Donnell is a former Australia netball international. Between 1990 and 1999, O'Donnell made 84 senior appearances for Australia. She was a member of the Australia teams that won gold medals at the 1991, 1995 and 1999 World Netball Championships, the 1993 World Games and the 1998 Commonwealth Games. During the Esso/Mobil Superleague era, O'Donnell played for several teams, including the Australian Institute of Sport and Contax. Between 1997 and 2005, O'Donnell played for Melbourne Kestrels in the Commonwealth Bank Trophy league. In 1992, she was awarded the Medal of the Order of Australia. In June 2024 Shelley's daughter, Hannah Mundy, was selected in the Australian Diamonds netball squad.

== Early life and family ==
Shelley O'Donnell is the daughter of Bev and Graeme O'Donnell. The O'Donnell family is from Ringwood North, Victoria. She is a member of a prominent Australian rules football family. O'Donnell's paternal grandmother, Eileen O'Donnell (née Rankin) was the daughter of Teddy Rankin and the sister of Bert, Cliff and Doug Rankin. All four were prominent players with Geelong. Her father and brother, Gary O'Donnell were also notable players. Her sister, Wendy O'Donnell, is also a netball player. In 2019 O'Donnell's daughter, Hannah Mundy, was selected to play for Victorian Fury. Mundy plays for the Melbourne Vixens, including in their 2025 Grand Final win and is a successful content creator on TikTok.

== Playing career ==
=== Esso/Mobil Superleague ===
During the Esso/Mobil Superleague era, O'Donnell and her sister Wendy played together for several teams. In 1987, together with Shelley Oates-Wilding, they were both members of the Australian Institute of Sport team that were grand finalists. In 1989, together with Nicole Richardson, they played for Melbourne/Doncaster Keas. In 1990 they played for Melbourne City, a composite team coached by Norma Plummer and also featuring Roselee Jencke and Simone McKinnis. Melbourne City finished as champions after defeating Contax 52–42 in the grand final. In 1993, alongside Kathryn Harby and Julie Nykiel, she played for Contax as an "import player". In 1994 she captained Melbourne Keas while Nicole Richardson served as vice-captain. In 1996 she captained the AIS team after returning as an "import player".

=== Melbourne Kestrels ===
Between 1997 and 2005, O'Donnell played for Melbourne Kestrels in the Commonwealth Bank Trophy league. She was the inaugural Kestrels captain and continued in the role until 2000. She missed the 2001 and 2002 seasons after giving birth to her daughter, Hannah. She returned in 2003, but then missed the 2004 season after giving birth to her son, Jasper. She then made a second comeback in 2005 and played her final senior netball season.

=== Australia ===
Between 1990 and 1999, O'Donnell made 84 senior appearances for Australia. O'Donnell previously represented Australia at under-21 level, including at the 1988 World Youth Netball Championships, when her teammates included her sister, Wendy. She made her senior debut on 21 November 1990. She was subsequently a member of the Australia teams that won gold medals at the 1991, 1995 and 1999 World Netball Championships, the 1993 World Games and the 1998 Commonwealth Games. O'Donnell was vice-captain of the 1999 World Netball Championship squad and announced her retirement from international netball following their title win. In 1992 O'Donnell, along with the rest of the gold medal-winning 1991 World Netball Championship squad, were awarded the Medal of the Order of Australia. In 2010, O'Donnell was inducted into the Australian Netball Hall of Fame.

Tournaments	Place
1988 World Youth Netball Championships	1st place, gold medalist(s)
1991 World Netball Championships	1st place, gold medalist(s)
1993 World Games	1st place, gold medalist(s)
1995 World Netball Championships	1st place, gold medalist(s)
1998 Commonwealth Games	1st place, gold medalist(s)
1999 World Netball Championships	1st place, gold medalist(s)

== Coach and commentator ==
Since retiring as a netball player, O'Donnell has remained involved in the game, both as a commentator with ABC and as a coach. In 2017 and 2018 she coached the Eastern Football Netball League inter-league team. She is currently netball director at Melbourne school Korowa.

== Honours ==
Australia

- World Netball Championships
  - Winners: 1991, 1995, 1999
- Commonwealth Games
  - Winners: 1998
- World Games
  - Winners: 1993

Melbourne City

- Esso Super League
  - Winners: 1990

Australian Institute of Sport

- Esso Super League
  - Runners up: 1987
