= Graeme O'Donnell =

Australian rules footballer (1938–2023)

Personal information
- Full name: Graeme Charles O'Donnell
- Born: 19 July 1938
- Died: 22 August 2023 (aged 85)
- Original team: Geelong West
- Height: 174 cm (5 ft 9 in)
- Weight: 72 kg (159 lb)

Playing career^{1}
| Years | Club | Games (Goals) |
| 1961–62 | Geelong | 7 (4) |
| 1963–64 | North Melbourne | 16 (18) |
| Total | | 23 (22) |
- ^{1} Playing statistics correct to the end of 1964.

Graeme Charles O'Donnell (19 July 1938 – 22 August 2023) was an Australian rules footballer who played with Geelong and North Melbourne in the Victorian Football League (VFL). His son, Gary, was a premiership player and captain with Essendon in the 1980s and 1990s.

== Personal life and death ==
Graeme O'Donnell was the son of Leo O'Donnell and Eileen O'Donnell (née Rankin). His mother was the daughter of Teddy Rankin and the sister of Bert, Cliff and Doug Rankin. Graeme was the father of both Gary O'Donnell and Shelley O'Donnell. Gary played for Essendon between 1987 and 1998 and Shelley is a former Australia netball international.

O'Donnell died on 22 August 2023, at the age of 85.
