= Ringwood North =

- Suburb
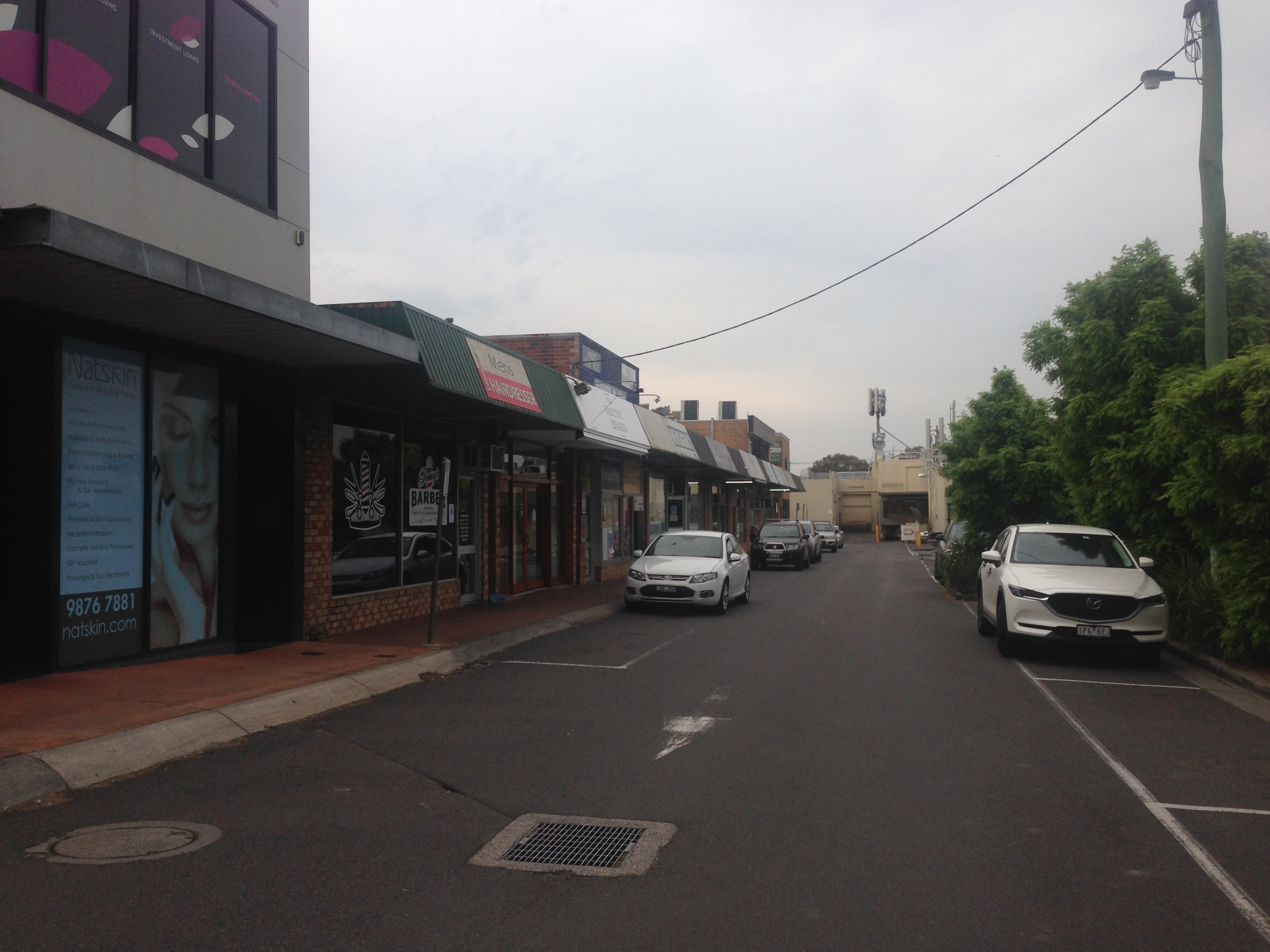
- Shops at Ringwood North

- Interactive map of Ringwood North
- Coordinates: 37.795°S 145.233°E
- Country: Australia
- State: Victoria
- Region: Greater Melbourne
- City: Melbourne
- LGAs: City of Manningham; City of Maroondah
- Location: 26 km (16 mi) E of Melbourne CBD (Central Melbourne)

Government
  - State electorate: Warrandyte
  - Federal division: Deakin

Area
  - Total: 5.2 km^{2} (2.0 sq mi)
- Elevation: 146 m (479 ft)

Population
  - Total: 9,964 (2021 census)
  - Density: 1,916/km^{2} (4,960/sq mi)
- Postcode: 3134
- County: Evelyn
Suburbs around Ringwood North
Park Orchards	Warrandyte South	Warranwood
Donvale	Ringwood North	Ringwood
Mitcham	Ringwood	Ringwood

Ringwood North is a suburb of Melbourne, Victoria, Australia, 26 kilometres (16 mi) east of Melbourne's Central Business District, located within the Cities of Manningham and Maroondah local government areas. Ringwood North recorded a population of 9,964 at the 2021 census.

The suburb is mostly located within the City of Maroondah, with a small part in the north west of the suburb being located within the City of Manningham.

It is bounded on the south by Loughnan, Warrandyte and Wonga Roads (these roads flow into one another continuously). Glenvale Road forms the westernmost boundary in the southern part of the suburb, with the Warrandyte-Ringwood Road forming the western boundary at the northern end of the suburb. The eastern and northern boundaries follow property lines, rather than roads.

Ringwood North Post Office opened on 9 August 1920, in the then rural area.

Ringwood North has its own shopping centre and also has plenty of parklands and reserves nearby without being excessively rural, like Wonga Park or Warrandyte. The style of its roads is distinct from the urban, parallel streetscapes of Ringwood and the circular, 'contour-line' style streets found in neighbouring Park Orchards.

Ringwood North is a hilly area, which is especially evident around the Loughnan's Hill area and Glenvale Road. Glenvale Road also marks the boundary between Ringwood North and Donvale and also the boundary between Maroondah and Manningham.

== Education ==
=== Primary schools ===
- Ringwood Heights Primary School
- Ringwood North Primary School
- Holy Spirit Community School

=== Secondary schools ===
There are no secondary schools within the suburb of Ringwood North however Norwood Secondary College lies just over the boundary with the neighbouring suburb of Ringwood.

== Sport ==
The suburb has an Australian rules football team, the North Ringwood Saints, who compete in the Eastern Football League.

The suburb also has a cricket club, the North Ringwood Bulls, which takes part in the Ringwood and District Cricket Association.

== Notable people ==
- Dean Bailey - Australian rules footballer and coach
- Peter Banfield - Australian rules footballer
- Gary O'Donnell - Australian rules footballer
- Shelley O'Donnell - netballer
- Paul Salmon - Australian rules footballer
- Tom Boyd- AFL player
- Travis Cloke- AFL player
- Pat Cash-tennis player

== See also ==
- City of Doncaster and Templestowe – Parts of Ringwood North were previously within this former local government area.
- City of Ringwood – Parts of Ringwood North were previously within this former local government area.
