= Georgie Rankin =

Australian rules footballer

Personal information
- Born: 28 January 1998 (age 28); Geelong, Victoria
- Original team: Surfers Paradise
- Debut: Round 1, 2019, Geelong vs. Collingwood, at GMHBA Stadium
- Height: 172 cm (5 ft 8 in)

Club information
- Current club: Geelong
- Number: 10

Playing career^{1}
Years	Club	Games (Goals)
2019–	Geelong	66 (2)
- ^{1} Playing statistics correct to the end of the 2025 season.

Georgie Rankin (born 28 January 1998) is an Australian rules footballer with the Geelong Football Club in the AFL Women's (AFLW).

Rankin was born and grew up in Geelong, Victoria before moving to Gold Coast, Queensland. A basketballer with the Gold Coast Rollers in the Queensland Basketball League, Rankin switched to football in 2018 and was part of the inaugural Surfers Paradise women's team. She was then recruited by Geelong as a cross-code rookie prior to the club's inaugural season in the AFLW, and made her AFLW debut during the first round of the 2019 season, against Collingwood at GMHBA Stadium.

Rankin's great-great-grandfather, Teddy, as well as three of his sons Cliff, Doug and Bert, all played for Geelong in the then Victorian Football League (VFL).
