= Rankin family of Geelong =

Pioneering family of the Geelong district of Victoria, Australia

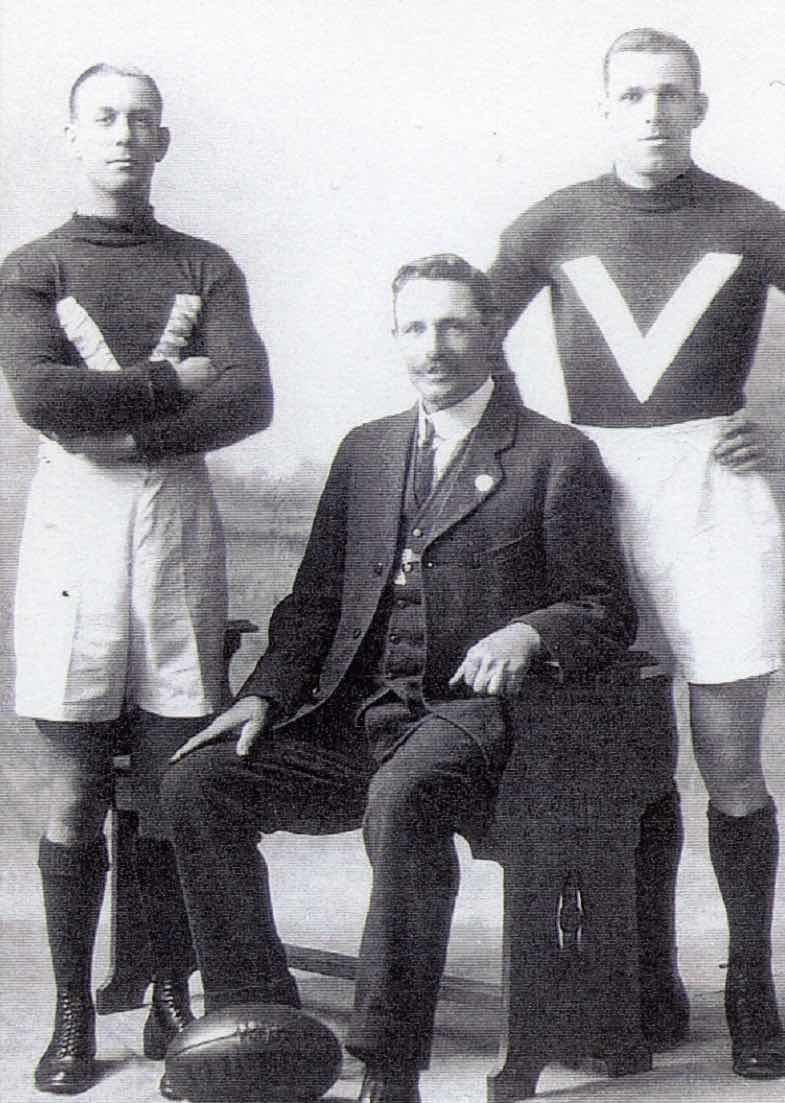
Cliff and Bert Rankin standing with their father, Edwin "Teddy" Rankin, on the occasion of the sons' selection in the 1923 Victorian state team

The Rankins were a pioneering family of the Geelong district. The family produced a dynasty of champion Australian rules footballers, including three captains of the Geelong Football Club, two Carji Greeves medallists and played 582 games for Geelong, between them.

== Migration to Australia ==
The Rankins came from the Braintree district of Essex. In 1841, Samuel Rankin, Sarah Rankin (née Warren), and five of their children were listed as "pauper" inmates of the Braintree Union Workhouse. Ten years later, they secured passage as "assisted migrants" to Australia, arriving in Geelong in 1852. After first settling at Freshwater Creek, near Mount Duneed, the Rankins relocated to Highton. The family prospered in the district. An 1897 newspaper report records a gathering at which were counted 165 descendants, including 85 great-grandchildren.

It is one of the youngest boys, Walter Rankin (1849–1930), whose line was responsible for the Geelong football dynasty. One of Walter's sons and one of his grandsons also served in the Australian Imperial Force during the First World War, namely, Cornelius and Edwin's son, Cliff.

== Edwin "Teddy" Rankin and his brothers ==
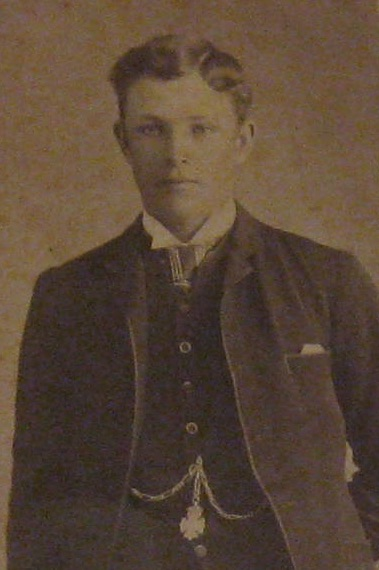
Studio portrait (c.1892) Edwin "Teddy" Rankin.

Edwin "Teddy" Rankin (1872–1944), was a member of Geelong's inaugural Victorian Football League (VFL) team of 1897 and captain of the team. In 1903, he became the first player to play 100 VFL matches for the club and won the Geelong Football Club's best and fairest award. He was also the first player to touch the ball on the ground, rather than bounce it, an innovation within the rules, which was later widely adopted. During his career, Teddy Rankin declined offers to transfer to other clubs and stood against the emerging practice of player payments. After football, Teddy Rankin was employed as curator of Geelong College oval and Corio Oval. Three of his sons played for Geelong.

Teddy's brothers, Samuel and Thomas, were also Geelong footballers. Sam is reported as not being selected in the senior team, while Tom served the club in 47 matches in the 1904–06 seasons.

== Bert, Cliff and Doug Rankin ==
Albert 'Bert' Rankin (1893–1971) features in a number of VFL/AFL family records. In 1912, less than two years after his father Teddy had retired as a player, Rankin was playing senior football, which still stands as the VFL/AFL record. In 1923, Bert Rankin became Geelong captain. When his brother Cliff was appointed vice-captain in the same season, the Rankins became the first brothers to fill both positions in the same VFL team. It was also the first year in which two brothers were to play in the same representative side.

Bert Rankin's career came to a controversial end in 1923 when, after poor form, the captain was dropped on the eve of the first semi-final. Bert's brother Cliff was so upset that he refused to take the field. The league investigated the matter, suspicious as to why Rankin was dropped and whether this was connected to the defeat of the team. He was awarded Geelong's best and fairest player for the 1917 VFL season and is credited with giving the Geelong club the nickname of "the Cats". After the disappointment of the 1923 season, he left Geelong to coach the Dimboola Football Club.

Bert's younger brother, Clifford, known as "Cliff" or "Ticker" (1896–1975), also became a champion footballer playing mainly as a forward. He captained Geelong, including the 1925 premiership season. Cliff Rankin also served as playing coach of Geelong from 1925 until his retirement in 1927. He represented Victoria 14 times and was captain of the state team in 1926. Cliff Rankin was Geelong's leading club goal kicker from 1920 to 1923. His career was interrupted by his war service as a gunner during the First World War in France. While with the army he even represented the Australian Imperial Force in the rival code of rugby, playing as the fullback of the Australian team. He was considered by football experts to be the best of the Rankins and was selected in Geelong's "Team of the Century".

The third son of Teddy Rankin to play for Geelong was Edwin "Doug" Rankin (1915–1987). He played nine games and kicked eight goals for Geelong in the 1938–1939 seasons, before enlisting for active service in the Second World War.

== Grandchildren and great-grandchildren ==
=== The O'Donnells ===
Eileen O'Donnell (née Rankin) was the daughter of Teddy Rankin and Adelaide Rankin and the sister of Bert, Cliff and Doug Rankin. In April 1937, Eileen married Leo O'Donnell, and they moved into Anderson Street, East Geelong. Eileen and Leo had two sons, Ian and Graeme O'Donnell. Graeme played for Geelong and North Melbourne during 1960s. He was also the father of both Gary O'Donnell and Shelley O'Donnell. Gary played for Essendon between 1987 and 1998 and Shelley is a former Australia netball international.

=== Georgie Rankin ===
Georgie Rankin, an AFL Women's player with Geelong is the great-granddaughter of Teddy Rankin.
