= Warrandyte South =

Coordinates: 37°46′05″S 145°12′04″E

Warrandyte South Melbourne, Victoria
- Population: 671 (2021 census)
- Postcode(s): 3134
- Location: 25 km (16 mi) from Melbourne
- LGA(s): City of Manningham
- State electorate(s): Warrandyte
- Federal division(s): Deakin; Menzies
Localities around Warrandyte South:
Warrandyte	Wonga Park	Wonga Park
Park Orchards	Warrandyte South	Wonga Park
Park Orchards	Ringwood North	Warranwood

Warrandyte South is a locality within Greater Melbourne, beyond the Melbourne Metropolitan Area Urban Growth Boundary, 25 km north-east of Melbourne's Central Business District, located within the City of Manningham local government area. Warrandyte South recorded a population of 671 at the 2021 census.

It is bounded in the west by Ringwood Road, in the north by Anzac Road, in the east by Jumping Creek and in the south by Old Warrandyte Road.

== History ==
Warrandyte South State School Post Office opened in 1906, was renamed Warrandyte South in 1907 and closed in 1990.

== See also ==
- City of Doncaster and Templestowe – Warrandyte South was previously within this former local government area.
- Shire of Lillydale – Warrandyte South was previously within this former local government area.
