= Tom Rankin =

Australian rules footballer

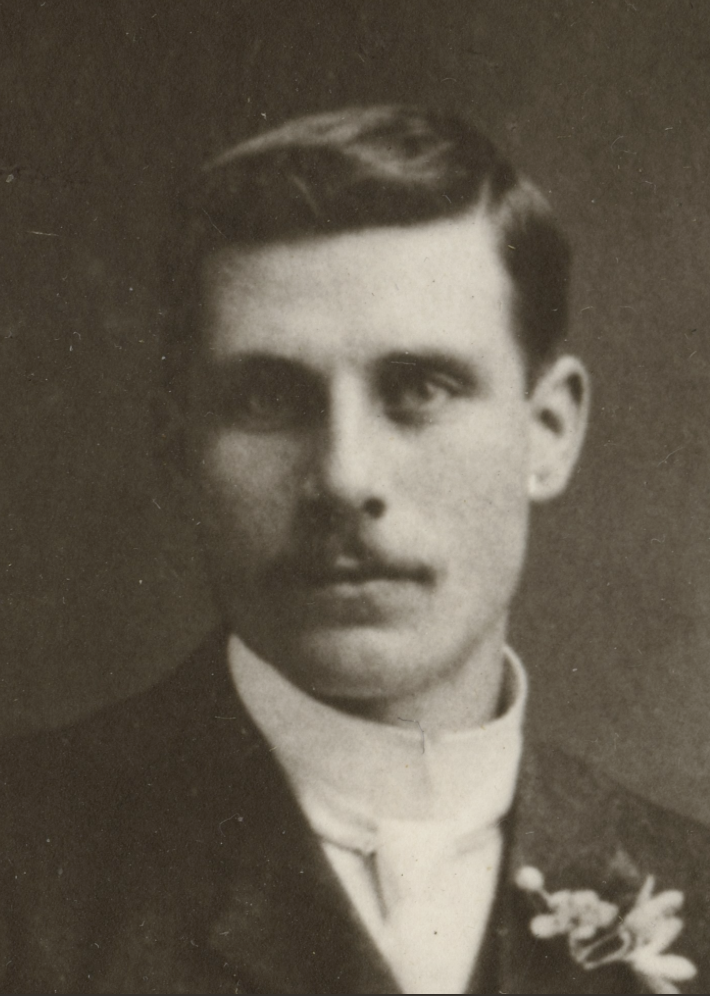
- Tom Rankin, Geelong footballer, 1905

Personal information
- Full name: Thomas Charles Rankin
- Born: 3 May 1881; Geelong, Victoria
- Died: 18 February 1958 (aged 76); Geelong, Victoria
- Height: 180 cm (5 ft 11 in)
- Weight: 70 kg (154 lb)

Playing career^{1}
Years	Club	Games (Goals)
1904–06	Geelong	47 (12)
- ^{1} Playing statistics correct to the end of 1906.

Thomas Charles Rankin (3 May 1881 – 18 February 1958) was an Australian rules footballer who played with Geelong in the Victorian Football League (VFL). His brother, Edwin (known as ‘Teddy’) and other members of the Rankin family also played for Geelong.

Rankin got off to a promising start in the 1904 and early 1905 seasons, but his career was compromised by serious injuries to his knee and kidney sustained during a match in May 1905. He married Adeline Harrison and raised a family of ten children. After football, he remained in Geelong where he worked as a gardener and greenkeeper.
