= Norwood Secondary College =

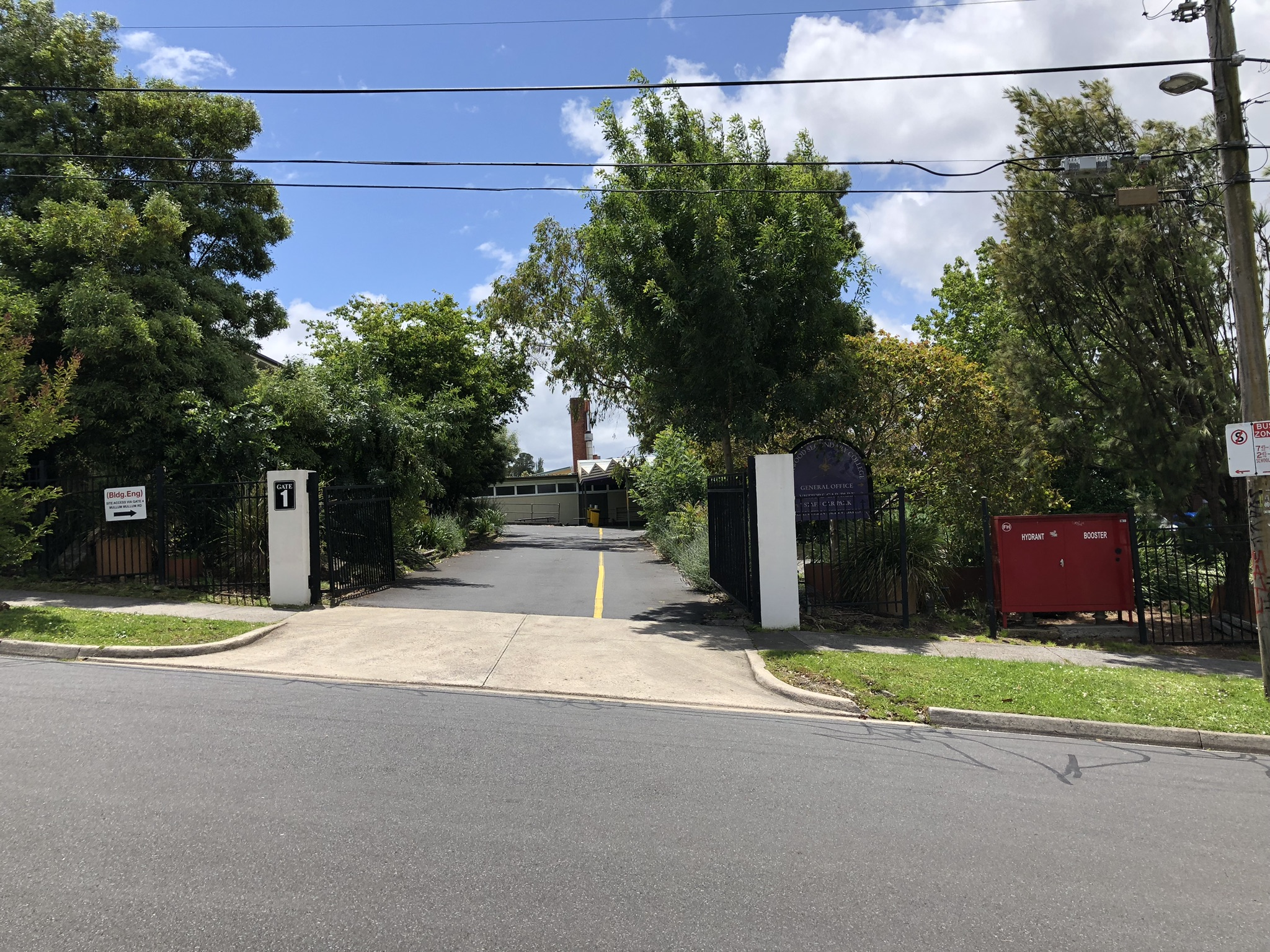
- Entrance from Byron Street

Location
- 9 Byron Street; Ringwood, Victoria; Australia; 37°47′59″S 145°14′15″E

Information
- Type: State, co-educational, Secondary, day school
- Motto: Latin: Fidelis (Faithful)
- Established: 1958; 68 years ago
- Principal: Jackie Harris; Junior school: Nicholas Mammoliti; Senior school: Alexis Ford
- Years: 7–12
- Gender: co-educational
- Enrolment: ~1100
- Campus: Suburban
- Houses: Yarra, Maroondah, Kalinda, Mullum
- Colours: Purple, yellow, grey, black, white
- Website: www.norwood.vic.edu.au

Norwood Secondary College is a secondary school located in Melbourne's eastern suburbs, situated in Ringwood, Victoria, Australia and right next to Mullum Primary School. Norwood Secondary College, in the City of Maroondah, is a single campus co-educational year 7–12 college with an enrolment of around 1100 students. Year 11 and 12 students can elect to undertake a VCE or VCAL. The year 2018 was Norwood's 60th anniversary.

== New buildings ==
In late 2017, approximately one third of the school's multipurpose courts were demolished so Norwood's new gymnasium facilities could be built. Norwood Secondary College had been awaiting this construction for many years. Construction has since been completed, and classes have been running inside the gym and the classrooms located within the building. On the second day of the 2019 school year the first ever indoor full college assembly was held in the gymnasium with a number of special guests.

In late 2023, some classrooms were demolished as well as a locker bay that made way for a large 2 story building full of classrooms named M Block. Year 11's and 12's use those classrooms primarily and there is also a small study classroom downstairs.

In late 2018, the senior science classrooms were demolished, and the media room (a portable classroom) relocated to the oval to make way for a dedicated STEM centre with a senior chemistry/biology laboratory, a senior physics laboratory, a junior science laboratory and a "maker space". The new STEM centre was constructed at a factory in Kilsyth separated into modules, transported to Norwood and reassembled on site to a satisfactory level such that the external appearance of the building could be observed on the 2019 college open night. From 17 July 2019 students will have classes scheduled in the newly assembled building. The college community has been waiting for an upgrade such as this for decades. The STEM centre was built in such a way that when Norwood is given more funds, further science labs will be able to be added to the building.

== Potential for amalgamation ==
From 2004 to 2010, discussions were held with the aim of amalgamating Parkwood and Norwood Secondary Colleges on the Parkwood site. This would have led to the redevelopment of the Norwood site for housing, and the relocation of the school away from its local community. In 2010, it was announced that these plans were not supported by the school communities and did not proceed. Parkwood Secondary College closed in a positive fashion as the result of a decision of its School Council. Norwood Secondary College Has gained some Government funding for upgraded and new facilities to be built at its current location in Byron Street. The driving force behind the decision not to proceed to amalgamate Norwood and Parkwood Secondary Colleges on the Parkwood site was Vincent Virtue who had served for long periods of time as principal of both schools.

== The "Ringwood Deer Attack" ==
On 17 August 2015, a wild sambar deer forced the school into lockdown shortly before recess. Initially, the deer was sighted in a number of backyards prior to making an appearance at Norwood. The deer was injured and a risk to the public; it was decided that it had to be put down. A few students from Norwood Secondary College witnessed the deer being euthanized and had undergone counselling.

== The "controversial" uniform policy and petition ==
In 2017, a parent of students attending school at Norwood Secondary College started a change.org petition because of a poorly timed change to the college uniform policy (occurred in 2016).

== Notable alumni ==
- Greg Macainsh – Musician and songwriter – member of Skyhooks
- Neil Robertson – 2010 World Snooker Champion
- Paul Salmon – AFL footballer, Essendon Football Club and Hawthorn Football Club
- Gary O’Donnell – AFL footballer, Essendon Football Club
- Adam Cerra – AFL footballer, Carlton and Fremantle
- Shelley O’Donnell – Netballer
- Stephen Quartermain – Sports Broadcaster/Journalist
- Wil Parker - AFL Footballer, Collingwood Football Club
- Geoff Parker - AFL Footballer, Essendon Football Club - First Class Cricketer, Victoria and Sth Australia

== See also ==
- List of schools in Victoria
