= Electoral district of Warrandyte =

State electoral district of Victoria, Australia

Warrandyte Victoria—Legislative Assembly
- Interactive map of electoral district boundaries from the 2022 state election
- State: Victoria
- Created: 1976
- MP: Nicole Werner
- Party: Liberal
- Namesake: Warrandyte
- Electors: 43,282 (2018)
- Area: 107 km^{2} (41.3 sq mi)
- Demographic: Outer metropolitan
- Coordinates: 37°45′36″S 145°13′48″E

The electoral district of Warrandyte is an Australian electoral district of the Victorian Legislative Assembly. It is an outer metropolitan electorate and contains the suburbs of Park Orchards, Ringwood North, Warrandyte, Warrandyte North, Warrandyte South, Warranwood, Wonga Park, most of Donvale, and parts of Chirnside Park, Doncaster East, and Ringwood.

Warrandyte was originally a marginal seat, being held by the Liberal Party from the creation of the electorate at the 1976 election until it lost government at the 1982 election. The seat was then Labor-held until the 1988 election, when Phil Honeywood became the only Liberal to win a seat from Labor.

Honeywood made the seat very secure for the Liberals, to the extent that he comfortably held the seat at the 2002 election, despite over half of his Legislative Assembly colleagues losing their seats. Honeywood became Deputy Leader of the Opposition, before retiring at the 2006 election. Fellow Liberal, Ryan Smith, easily retained the seat.

Smith resigned just six months after being re-elected at the 2022 Victorian state election, causing the 2023 Warrandyte state by-election. Nicole Werner retained the seat for the Liberal Party.

== Members for Warrandyte ==
| Member | Party | Term |
|---|---|---|
| Norman Lacy | Liberal | 1976–1982 |
| Lou Hill | Labor | 1982–1988 |
| Phil Honeywood | Liberal | 1988–2006 |
| Ryan Smith | Liberal | 2006–2023 |
| Nicole Werner | Liberal | 2023–present |

== Election results ==
2023 Warrandyte state by-election
| Party | Candidate | Votes | % | ±% |
|---|---|---|---|---|
| Liberal | Nicole Werner | 21,921 | 57.3 | +9.9 |
| Greens | Tomas Lightbody | 7,130 | 18.6 | +6.9 |
| Democratic Labour | Cary de Wit | 2,204 | 5.8 | +5.8 |
| Independent | Maya Tesa | 1,556 | 4.1 | +4.1 |
| Victorian Socialists | Colleen Bolger | 1,459 | 3.8 | +3.8 |
| Family First | Richard Griffith-Jones | 1,073 | 2.8 | −1.2 |
| Sustainable Australia | Jack Corcoran | 1,030 | 2.7 | +2.7 |
| Freedom | Greg Cheesman | 846 | 2.2 | +2.2 |
| Independent | Wai Man Raymond Chow | 694 | 1.8 | +1.8 |
| Independent | Morgan Ranieri | 168 | 0.4 | +0.4 |
| Independent | Alan Max Menadue | 121 | 0.3 | +0.3 |
| Independent | Philip Jenkins | 77 | 0.2 | +0.2 |
| Total formal votes | | 38,279 | 94.2 | −2.4 |
| Informal votes | | 2,344 | 5.8 | +2.4 |
| Turnout | | 40,623 | 79.7 | −11.9 |
Two-candidate-preferred result
| Liberal | Nicole Werner | 27,334 | 71.0 | +16.7 |
| Greens | Tomas Lightbody | 11,172 | 29.0 | +29.0 |
| Liberal hold | | | | |

== See also ==
- Parliaments of the Australian states and territories
- List of members of the Victorian Legislative Assembly
