= Warranwood =

Warranwood Melbourne, Victoria
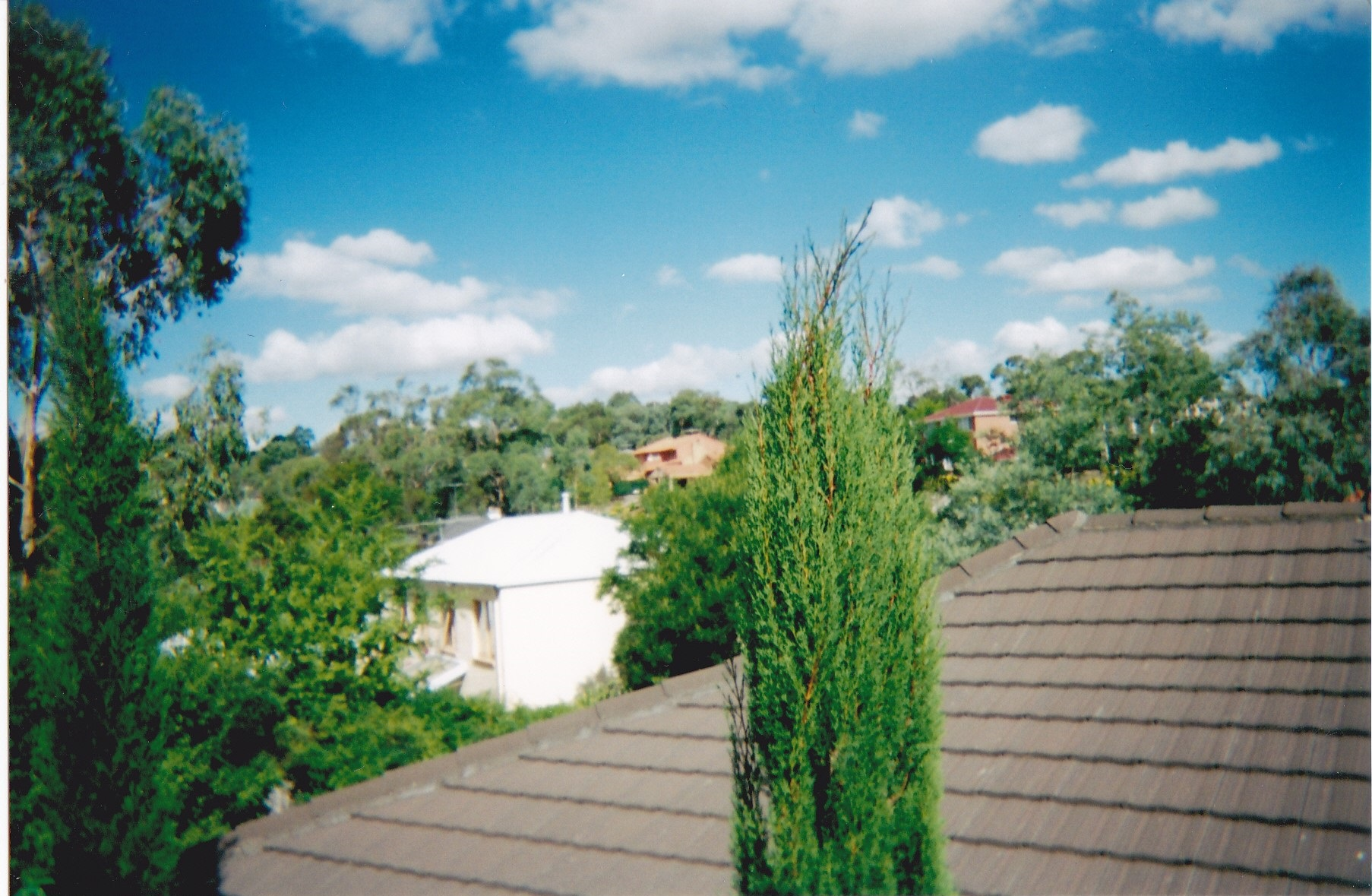
- Houses in Warranwood

- Coordinates: 37.773°S 145.251°E
- Population: 4,820 (2021 census)
  - Density: 1,610/km^{2} (4,200/sq mi)
- Postcode(s): 3134
- Elevation: 128 m (420 ft)
- Area: 3 km^{2} (1.2 sq mi)
- Location: 28 km (17 mi) E of Melbourne CBD (Central Melbourne)
- LGA(s): City of Maroondah
- Region: Greater Melbourne
- County: Evelyn
- State electorate(s): Warrandyte
- Federal division(s): Menzies
Suburbs around Warranwood:
Warrandyte South	Warrandyte South	Wonga Park
Ringwood North	Warranwood	Croydon Hills
Ringwood North	Ringwood	Croydon

Warranwood is a suburb of Melbourne, Victoria, Australia, 28 kilometres (17 mi) east of Melbourne's Central Business District, located within the City of Maroondah local government area. Warranwood recorded a population of 4,820 at the 2021 census.

== Etymology ==
Warranwood is adjacent to Warrandyte South and Ringwood North; its name is a conjunction of the two words. In 1946, the South Warrandyte Progress Association invited suggestions for a name, as at the time there was no definite name for the locality. At one time, it had been referred to as "Croydon Heights". The choice of "Warranwood" from part-time resident Mrs. J. Harrison of Brysons Road was accepted by postal authorities and the Shire of Lillydale.

== Education ==
Two schools are located in Warranwood; Melbourne Rudolf Steiner School, on Wonga Road and Warranwood Primary School, on Wellington Park Drive.

Warranwood Primary was formerly known as Warrandyte South Primary and relocated from Hall Rd. in Warrandyte South to its current location in Term 2, 1996.

== See also ==
- City of Doncaster and Templestowe – Warranwood was previously within this former local government area.
