= City of Doncaster & Templestowe =

Coordinates: 37°47′13″S 145°07′26″E

- Local government area
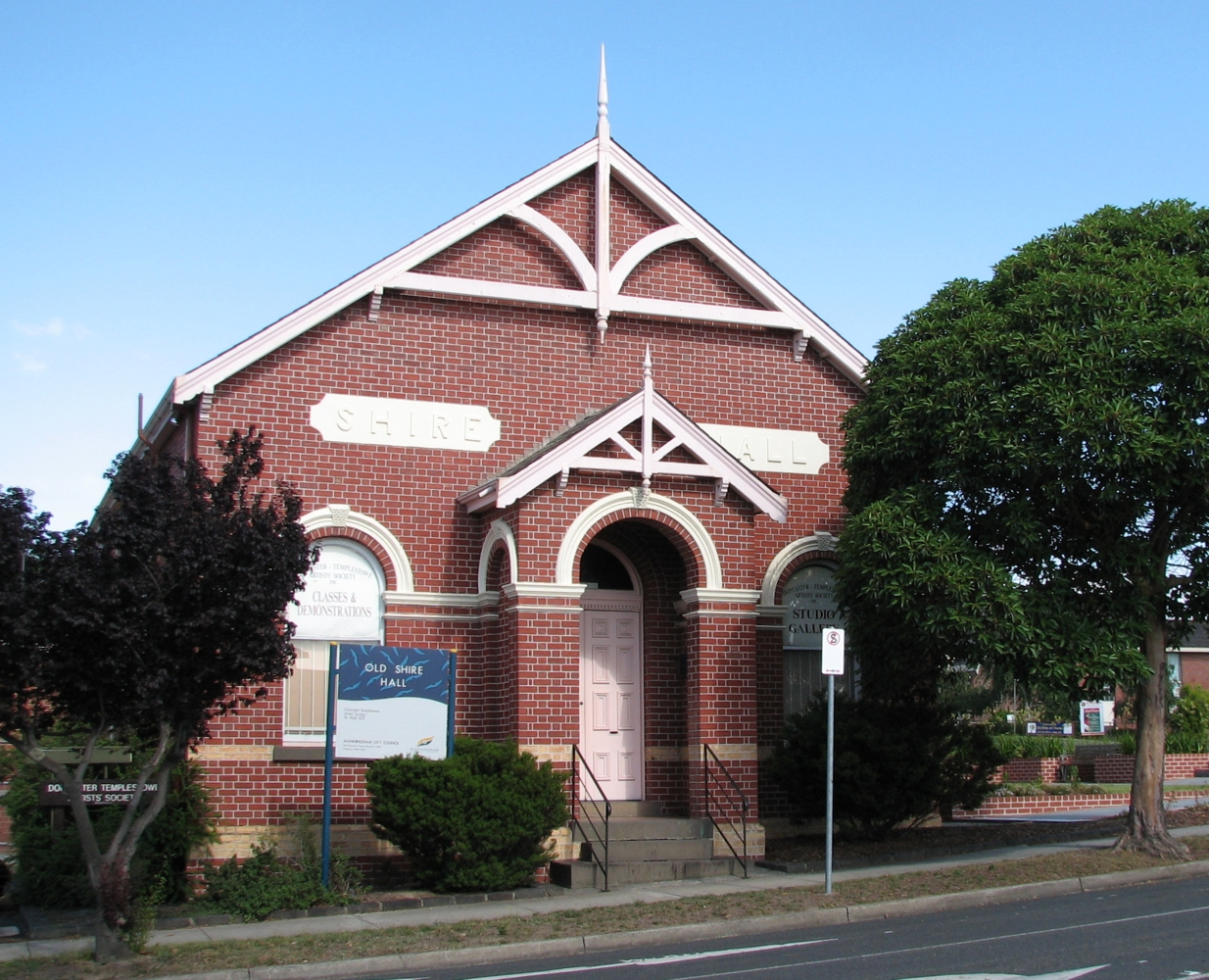
- Former Shire Hall in Council Street

- The extent of the City of Doncaster & Templestowe at its dissolution in 1994
- Country: Australia
- State: Victoria
- Region: Northeast Melbourne
- Established: 1856
- Council seat: Doncaster

Area
  - Total: 89.42 km^{2} (34.53 sq mi)

Population
  - Total: 102,898 (1991)
  - Density: 1,150.73/km^{2} (2,980.37/sq mi)
- County: Bourke, Evelyn
LGAs around City of Doncaster & Templestowe
Heidelberg	Eltham	Healesville
Heidelberg	City of Doncaster & Templestowe	Lillydale
Camberwell	Box Hill; Nunawading	Ringwood

The City of Doncaster & Templestowe was a local government area about 20 kilometres (12 mi) east-northeast of Melbourne, the state capital of Victoria, Australia. The city covered an area of 89.42 square kilometres (34.53 sq mi), and existed from 1915 until 1994. At its peak in the early 1990s, it had a population of just over 100,000.

== History ==
The origin of local government in the area dates back to 19 December 1856, when the Templestowe Road District was formed, following a public meeting and election at Bulleen Hotel. Two decades later, on 7 May 1875, the Shire of Bulleen was formed, incorporating the Roads Board area and Warrandyte. On 30 May 1890, the Doncaster Riding was severed and incorporated as the Shire of Doncaster, meeting in the old Shire Hall in Council Street. By this time, fruit growing had become the mainstay of Doncaster's rural economy. The Shire of Bulleen was renamed to the Shire of Templestowe on 12 May 1892, and reunited with Doncaster 23 years later under local government reforms on 1 October 1915, with the combined entity named the Shire of Doncaster & Templestowe on 16 March 1926.

Urbanisation was slow to reach the area, and the 1949 Australian Blue Book described the shire as "mainly undulating country with extensive views [and] some low, hilly ranges". Agricultural activities, such as fruit growing, dairying and sheep and cattle grazing, dominated the shire's economic life. By 1955, the population of the area had grown with suburban settlement and a new Shire Hall was built.

In July 1966, at a time of rapid suburban growth, the Shire sought to be created a City under the name of the "City of Koonarra", a portmanteau of Koonung (Creek) and Yarra (River). The name, invented by councillors, was perceived as "contrived" and lacking historical ties. After almost 2,500 residents signed petitions opposing the new name, the council abandoned it in December 1966. The municipality was proclaimed the City of Doncaster and Templestowe on 28 February 1967.

On 15 December 1994, the City of Doncaster & Templestowe was abolished, and along with the Wonga Park area from the Shire of Lillydale, was merged into the newly created City of Manningham.

At the time of dissolution, council meetings were held in the Municipal Offices in Doncaster Road, Doncaster. This facility is still used for the same purpose by the City of Manningham.

=== Land zoning ===
The City of Doncaster & Templestowe had about three hundred parks by the 1990s.

== Wards ==
The City of Doncaster & Templestowe was subdivided into four wards, each electing three councillors:

- Doncaster Ward
- Doncaster West Ward
- Templestowe Ward
- Warrandyte Ward

== Suburbs ==
- Bulleen
- Doncaster*
- Doncaster East
- Donvale
- Mitcham (shared with the City of Nunawading)
- Park Orchards
- Ringwood North (shared with the City of Ringwood)
- Templestowe
- Templestowe Lower
- Warrandyte
- Warrandyte South (shared with the Shire of Lillydale)
- Warranwood

* Council seat.

== Population ==
Year	Population
1911	1,195
1947	3,786
1954	6,814
1958	11,200*
1961	19,061
1966	38,061
1971	64,286
1976	82,090
1981	90,660
1986	99,269
1991	102,898

* Estimate in the 1958 Victorian Year Book.
