= Gary O'Donnell (Australian footballer) =

Australian rules footballer, born 1965

Personal information
- Full name: Gary O'Donnell
- Born: 12 May 1965 (age 61)
- Original team: North Ringwood (EFL)
- Height: 181 cm (5 ft 11 in)
- Weight: 85 kg (187 lb)
- Position: Midfielder

Playing career^{1}
Years	Club	Games (Goals)
1987–1998	Essendon	243 (88)

Representative team honours
Years	Team	Games (Goals)
	Victoria	9

Coaching career^{3}
Years	Club	Games (W–L–D)
2006	Essendon	1 (0–0–1)
- ^{1} Playing statistics correct to the end of 1998.^{3} Coaching statistics correct as of 2006.

Career highlights
- Essendon premiership player 1993; Crichton Medal 1993; Michael Tuck Medal 1994; Essendon captain 1996–1997

Gary O'Donnell (born 12 May 1965) is a former Australian rules footballer who played 243 games for the Essendon Football Club between 1987 and 1998. He previously served as the assistant coach in the role Offensive Strategy Coach at the Brisbane Lions.

== Family ==
O'Donnell is the son of Bev and Graeme O'Donnell. He is a member of a prominent Australian rules football family. O'Donnell's paternal grandmother, Eileen O'Donnell (née Rankin) was the daughter of Teddy Rankin and the sister of Bert, Cliff and Doug Rankin. All four were prominent players with Geelong. His father was also a notable player. His sister, Shelley O'Donnell, is a former Australia netball international.

== Playing career ==
O’Donnell was a junior teammate of Paul Salmon at North Ringwood where they won 4 premierships in succession from 1977 up to the under 16s in 1980. Before the introduction of the player draft, Ringwood was part of Essendon's recruitment zone.

=== Essendon Football Club ===
O’Donnell's start at VFL football didn't come easy: he played nearly 50 reserve grade matches before being selected to make his debut in the last game of the 1987 season. From there, he held down a steady place in the side, first as a defender, then later developing into a tagging midfielder who was capable of getting the football as well as keeping an opposition player quiet. At his peak, O'Donnell was regarded as one of the most consistent players in the competition, with commentators often stating that he "never plays a bad game".

O'Donnell played 243 games from 1987 to 1998, leading the Bombers as captain for two seasons in a decorated career in the red and black. Known as 'Mr Reliable', he was a vital part of Essendon's 1993 premiership side, a year which also saw him win the Crichton Medal as the Bombers' best and fairest.

Underlining this consistency is his record in the club best-and-fairest: O'Donnell finished in the top three six years in a row, winning it in 1993, a premiership year for the Bombers. He also won the Michael Tuck Medal in 1994 as the best player in the pre-season grand final. Additionally, O'Donnell represented Victoria nine times in state of origin football.

O'Donnell was always regarded as one of the most astute thinkers in the game, and was rewarded with the captaincy for the 1996 and 1997 seasons.

In 2025, O'Donnell was named at Number 19 in Don The Stat's Top 100 Essendon Players Since 1980.

== Coaching career ==
=== Brisbane Lions ===
He reputation was further enhanced when after his retirement from his playing career, he took up an assistant coaching role with the Brisbane Lions in 1999 under senior coach Leigh Matthews. His tactical insight was a key part of the Lions' rise up the ladder, culminating in three premierships from 2001 to 2003.

=== Essendon Football Club ===
After Brisbane's grand final loss in 2004, Gary O'Donnell announced that he would be returning to Essendon in 2005 as an assistant coach under senior coach Kevin Sheedy. In Round 16, 2006, O'Donnell coached Essendon as caretaker interim senior coach for one game due to the absence of regular senior coach Kevin Sheedy, who injured his shoulder in a collision with defender Dean Solomon at training. Essendon drew with rivals Carlton to end its then-record 14-match losing streak dating back to round two.

O'Donnell remained as an assistant coach at Essendon Football Club until the end of the 2010 season.

=== Return to Brisbane Lions ===
In October 2010, O'Donnell returned to the Brisbane Lions as an assistant coach under senior coach Michael Voss. O'Donnell left the Brisbane Lions at the end of the 2016 season.

== Statistics ==
=== Playing statistics ===
Legend
G	Goals	K	Kicks	D	Disposals	T	Tackles
B	Behinds	H	Handballs	M	Marks

Season	Team	No.	Games	Totals							Averages (per game)							Votes
Season	Team	No.	Games	G	B	K	H	D	M	T	G	B	K	H	D	M	T	Votes
1987	Essendon	44	1	0	0	4	3	7	1	3	0.0	0.0	4.0	3.0	7.0	1.0	3.0	0
1988	Essendon	44	20	5	1	196	109	305	41	35	0.3	0.1	9.8	5.5	15.3	2.1	1.8	0
1989	Essendon	44	25	3	7	277	176	453	73	32	0.1	0.3	11.1	7.0	18.1	2.9	1.3	3
1990	Essendon	10	25	11	11	346	158	504	69	32	0.4	0.4	13.8	6.3	20.2	2.8	1.3	10
1991	Essendon	10	22	5	5	253	174	427	50	23	0.2	0.2	11.5	7.9	19.4	2.3	1.0	2
1992	Essendon	10	20	10	13	296	157	453	75	31	0.5	0.7	14.8	7.9	22.7	3.8	1.6	2
1993†	Essendon	10	24	14	9	389	221	610	85	49	0.6	0.4	16.2	9.2	25.4	3.5	2.0	6
1994	Essendon	10	20	5	5	250	202	452	63	26	0.3	0.3	12.5	10.1	22.6	3.2	1.3	5
1995	Essendon	10	24	16	10	339	182	521	69	21	0.7	0.4	14.1	7.6	21.7	2.9	0.9	1
1996	Essendon	10	25	8	6	281	195	476	81	46	0.3	0.2	11.2	7.8	19.0	3.2	1.8	4
1997	Essendon	10	20	8	3	211	116	327	44	27	0.4	0.2	10.6	5.8	16.4	2.2	1.4	1
1998	Essendon	10	17	3	2	205	92	297	45	34	0.2	0.1	12.1	5.4	17.5	2.6	2.0	1
Career			243	88	72	3047	1785	4832	696	359	0.4	0.3	12.5	7.3	19.9	2.9	1.5	35

=== Coaching statistics ===
Legend
W	Wins	L	Losses	D	Draws	W%	Winning percentage	LP	Ladder position	LT	League teams

Season	Team	Games	W	L	D	W %	LP	LT
2006	Essendon	1	0	0	1	50.0%	—N/a	—N/a
Career totals		1	0	0	1	50.0%		
