= Park Orchards =

- Suburb
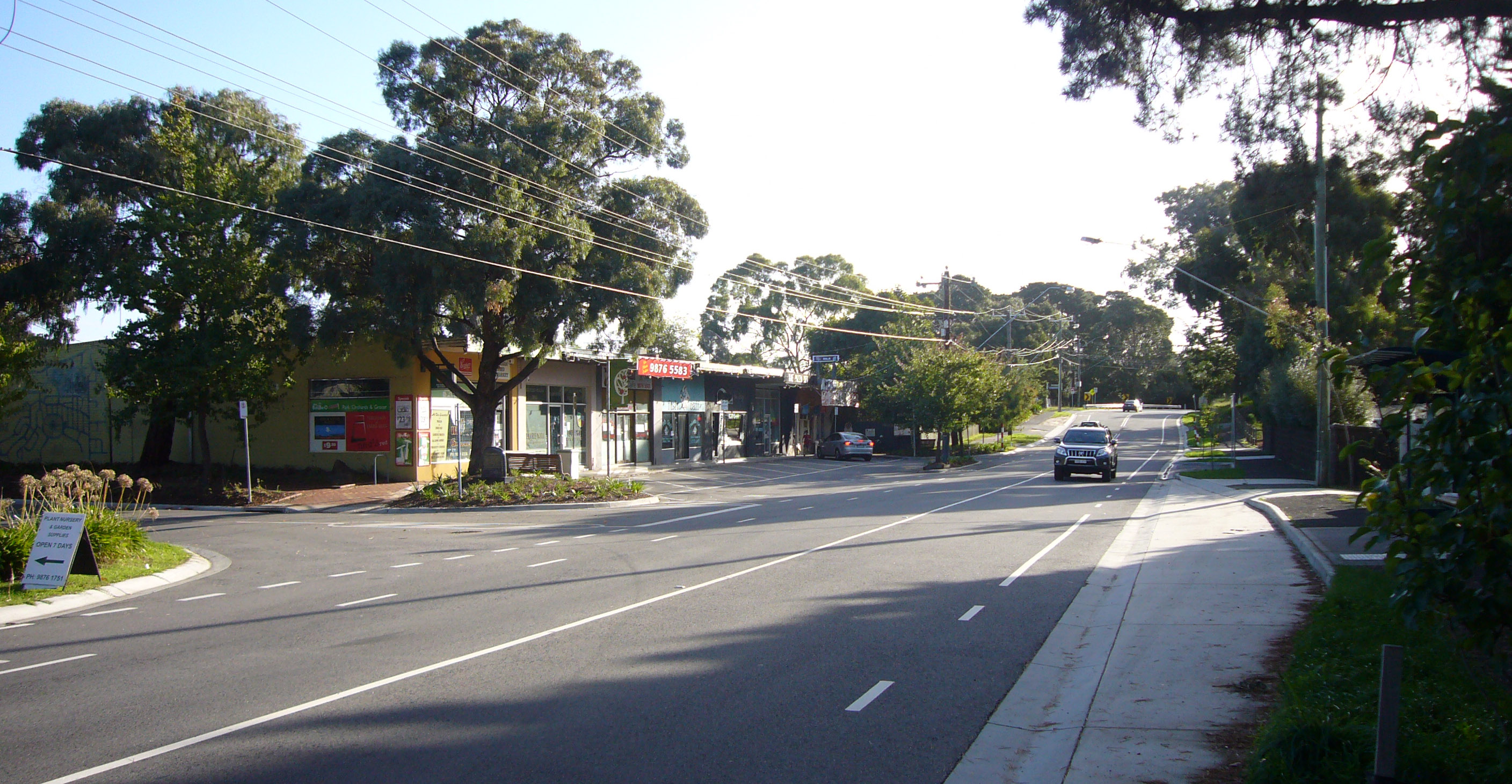
- Park Orchards shops

- Interactive map of Park Orchards
- Coordinates: 37.778°S 145.214°E
- Country: Australia
- State: Victoria
- City: Melbourne
- LGAs: City of Manningham; City of Maroondah
- Location: 25 km (16 mi) from Melbourne CBD

Government
  - State electorate: Warrandyte
  - Federal divisions: Deakin; Menzies

Area
  - Total: 9.5 km^{2} (3.7 sq mi)
- Elevation: 134 m (440 ft)

Population
  - Total: 3,835 (2021 census)
  - Density: 403.7/km^{2} (1,046/sq mi)
- Postcode: 3114
Suburbs around Park Orchards
Warrandyte	Warrandyte	Warrandyte South
Donvale	Park Orchards	Ringwood North
Donvale	Nunawading	Ringwood North

Park Orchards is a suburb of Melbourne, Victoria, Australia. It is 25 kilometres (16 mi) north-east of the Melbourne Central Business District, located within the City of Manningham and City of Maroondah local government areas. At the 2021 census, Park Orchards recorded a population of 3,835.

Park Orchards is primarily within the City of Manningham, with a small portion (the southern side of Williams road) located within the City of Maroondah. The suburb is within a Green Wedge area and is listed in the Australian Heritage Database.

== History ==
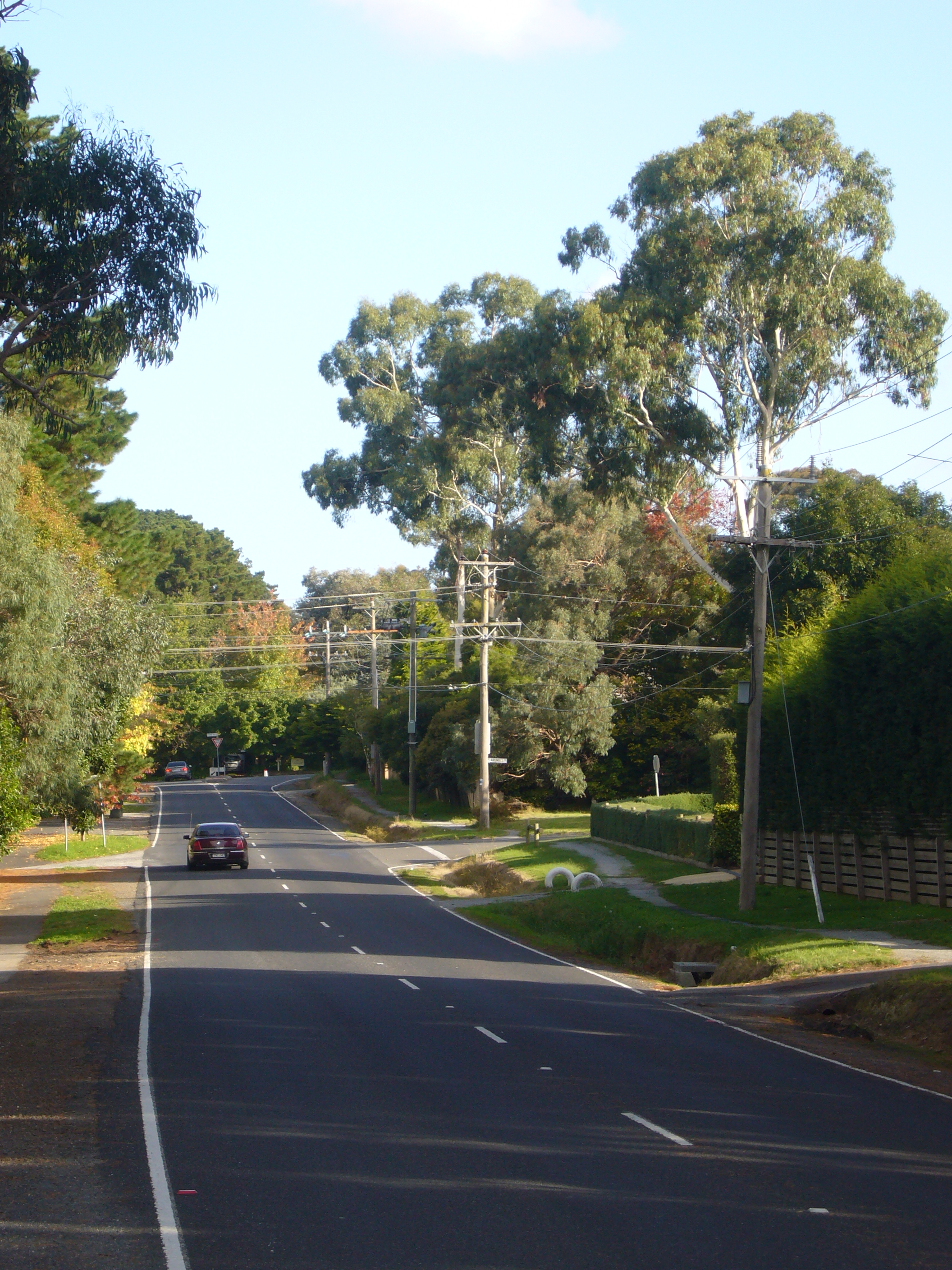
Knees Road

In 1902, prominent Victorian orchardist, Tom Petty, purchased 559 acres (226 ha) of land north of the Mitcham district and converted it to 80 orchard blocks.

In 1925, South Melbourne timber merchants, Australias Sharp and John Taylor, purchased Petty's land and launched the Park Orchards Country Club Estate. The subdivision was designed by Saxil Tuxen and George Miller. Tuxen had previously worked with Marion Mahony and Walter Burley Griffin on the Ranelagh Estate in Mt Eliza, which Sharp and Taylor also owned. Park Orchards was designed around a similar "Country Club" development.

The Clubhouse, named "The Chalet" (c.1929), was built in the Spanish Mission style, featuring a blackwood panelled interior, with a ballroom and billiard rooms. The Estate failed to attract buyers during the 1930s Depression, so Sharp and Taylor cleared much of the land and planted plant pine trees (many which still remain) to provide timber for their business.

In 1944, during World War II, the Australian Army requisitioned the Chalet and the football ground, and set up the School For Eastern Interpreters for Z Special Unit, as well as a training facility for the Australian Special Wireless Group. 400 personnel were stationed there, living in tents on the football ground. The army constructed the first water mains and connected the estate to the electrical grid.

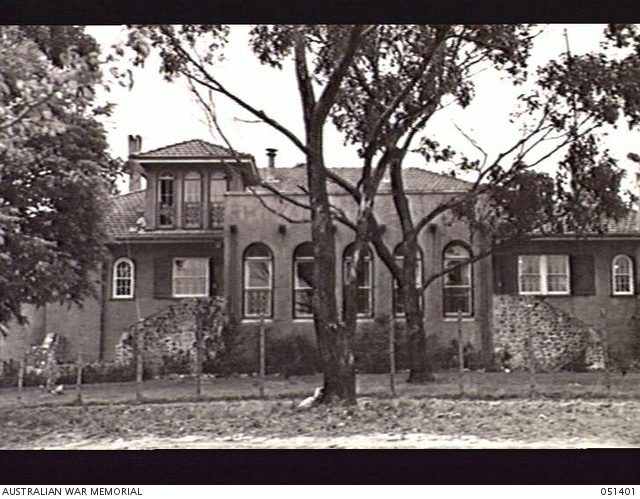
The Chalet in 1943 when being used by the Australian Army.

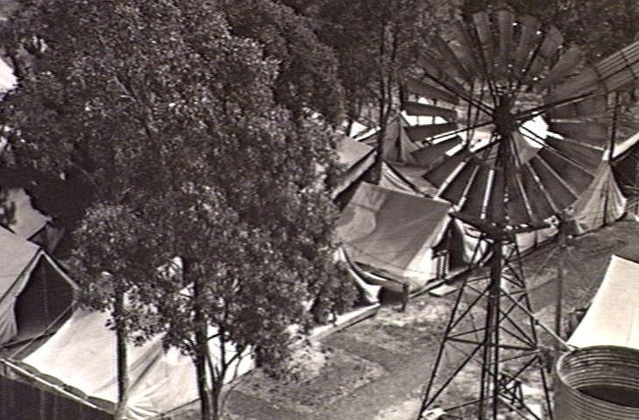
Domeney Reserve (behind the Chalet) in 1943 when being used by the Australian Army.

In late 1946, Sharp & Taylor sold the Estate at auction to Edments Ltd, owners of a department store in Melbourne, who reportedly planned to develop part of it into a holiday resort for their staff. They had a 9-hole golf course and cricket ground constructed in the 1950s.

By the late 1950s, the post-war migration boom saw an increase in properties being developed, and most of the blocks had been sold by 1960. The Park Orchards Post Office opened on 1 November 1959, and the Primary School opened on 14 March 1961. The final blocks sold in the early 1990s.

In 1965, The Chalet was the location of the first Catholic mass in Park Orchards. From the 1970s, the building was used as a restaurant and reception centre, and hosted the wedding of Mick Gatto in 1978. In 1994, the exterior was heritage-listed by the local council.

After The Chalet was sold in 2007, the new owners shut it down and submitted an application to build an aged care facility, which was rejected by the local council. In 2009, the community attempted to raise $1.5m to purchase the property to turn it into a community centre but failed. In 2010, VCAT determined, contrary to the local council ruling, that a planning permit should be issued, albeit with a requirement for reticulated sewerage services to be established. Later in 2010, the Park Orchards Ratepayers Association submitted that both The Chalet and the original Estate area be registered as places of significance by the Heritage Council, but the application was rejected due to not meeting the minimum criteria. As of 2015, The Chalet remains unused and neglected.

== Facilities ==
Park Orchards features a small commercial-zoned area on Park Rd (spread over either side of Hopetoun Rd) with around 20 lots.

There are two local primary schools and a number of private and state secondary schools in close proximity. The two primary schools are Park Orchards Primary School (public), which hosts a monthly Farmers Market, and St. Anne's (private).

Park Orchards Reserve is home to the Basketball Centre, Community House, Tennis Club, Children's Service Centre, Pre-school and Playground.

There are several other public reserves, including a large 41 hectare area of natural bushland known as 'The 100 Acres'.

Horse riding is a popular pastime in the area, with facilities including Helmast Park providing agistment and riding arenas, along with others in nearby Warrandyte.

== Sporting clubs ==
Domeney Reserve hosts the home games of the Park Orchards Cricket Club and the Park Orchards North Ringwood Parish Sharks Junior Football Club and the Park Orchards Football Netball Club. The Yarra Valley Old Boys Football Club used to hold their home games here as well.

The Park Orchards Tennis Club, the Steelers Park Orchards Basketball Club, Park Orchards Power Netball Club and the Park Orchards BMX Club are also based here.

Domeny Reserve and several roads in the area were used during the 1960s up until 1975 by the Austin 7 Club as part of their Observed Section (Mud) Trials.

== See also ==
- City of Doncaster and Templestowe – Park Orchards was previously within this former local government area.
