= Nicole Werner =

Australian politician

Nicole Werner MP
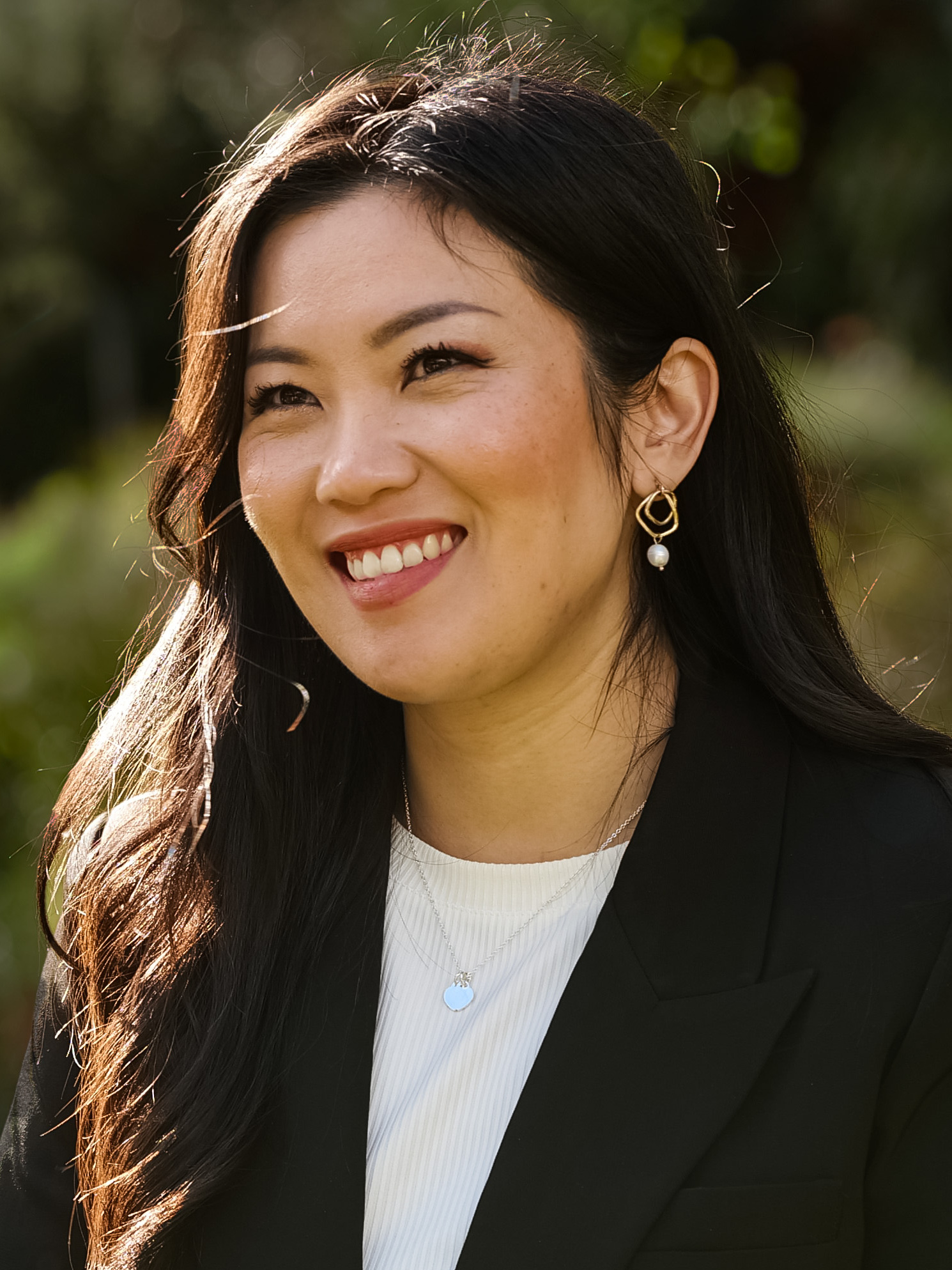

Member of the Victorian Legislative Assembly for Warrandyte
- Incumbent
- Assumed office 26 August 2023
- Preceded by: Ryan Smith

Personal details
- Born: Ta-Ei Yow Box Hill, Victoria, Australia
- Party: Liberal (since 2020)
- Spouse: Fraser Werner

Nicole Ta-Ei Werner is an Australian politician. She was elected as the member for Warrandyte in the Victorian Legislative Assembly at a by-election in 2023.

Before entering politics, Werner worked for not-for-profit organisations, including as a youth pastor at the Christian Pentecostal megachurch Planetshakers.

== Early life and career ==
Werner's parents migrated to Australia from Malaysia in the 1980s with their life savings of $800.

Werner was unable to speak English when she started kindergarten. She went on to study at language school in Doncaster East.

== Political career ==
Werner joined the Liberal Party in 2020, triggered by frustration of COVID-19 lockdowns.

Werner ran for the state seat of Box Hill in the 2022 Victorian State election, losing to incumbent member, Paul Hamer.

Following the retirement of long term Victorian Liberal MP, Ryan Smith, in the state seat of Warrandyte, sparking a by-election in the seat, Werner was preselected as the Liberal candidate in June 2023. Werner was elected to succeed Ryan Smith at the by-election on 26 August 2023.

Werner was the first woman to represent the seat of Warrandyte, first Asian-Australian woman and the youngest member of the Legislative Assembly.

Werner is considered a member of the Liberal party's 'religious right' grouping.

Victorian Legislative Assembly
Preceded by Ryan Smith	Member for Warrandyte; 2023–present	Incumbent
