= Freedom Party of Victoria =

Australian political party

- Abbreviation: FPV
- Leader: Morgan Jonas
- Founded: June 2022
- Registered: 29 September 2022
- Ideology: Anti-lockdown politics; Australian conservatism
- Political position: Right-wing to far-right
- Colors: Red Blue
- Slogan: “Protecting Victorian Jobs – Homes – Families”
- Legislative Assembly: 0 / 88
- Legislative Council: 0 / 40

Website
- freedompartyvic.com.au

The Freedom Party of Victoria is a right-wing to far right micro party registered in the Australian state of Victoria. Founded and registered in 2022, by anti-vaxxer and alt-right blogger Morgan Jonas, the party ran in the 2022 Victorian state election on an anti-lockdown and anti-vaccine mandate platform, but was unsuccessful in winning any seats.

The party emerged from the protests to the response from the state government during the COVID-19 pandemic, and features many candidates that hold anti-vaccine, anti-lockdown and anti-mandate views. The party's leader is Morgan Jonas, an anti-vaccine, anti-lockdown campaigner and former candidate of the United Australia Party (UAP). Jonas was later involved in stunts by far-right political operatives and the Exclusive Brethren to ambush progressive politicians during the 2025 Australian federal election campaign. From 2022 to 2023 the party's deputy leader was former Liberal National (LNP) Queensland politician Aidan McLindon, who left the party in 2023 to try to rejoin the Liberal Party.

The party contested the 2022 Victorian state election, winning less than 2% of the statewide vote and winning no seats in either chamber of the Victorian Parliament. Actor Damien Richardson ran for the party in 2022. The Party also contested the 2023 Narracan state supplementary election and 2023 Warrandyte state by-election.

In 2023, the party endorsed the No vote during the 2023 Australian Indigenous Voice referendum.

Critics of the party say that it spreads conspiracy theories and misinformation, especially about vaccines.

The party applied to change its name to Safety Victoria — Violent Crime Prevention in July 2026, which was approved by the Victorian Electoral Commission the following month.
