= Lou Hill =

Australian politician (born 1944)

Louis Joseph Hill (born 31 August 1944) is a Dutch-born Australian former barrister, member of the Victorian Legislative Assembly, Victorian Magistrate and currently a Nationally Accredited Mediator and recreational sailor.

Hill was born in Utrecht to clerk Louis Hill and Theodora Kleinhans and migrated to Australia in 1953. He attended St Francis Xavier's in Frankston, St Bede's in Mentone and then Melbourne University, where he received a Bachelor of Law in 1973 (and much later, in 1996, a Master of Law).

From 1961 to 1964, Hill was a bank officer, then a public servant from 1965 to 1970. He was admitted as a Barrister and Solicitor in 1973 and called to the Victorian Bar in 1975. In 1974 he married Elish Josephine Cooke; they had two sons. They divorced in 2008.

In 1982, he was elected to the Victorian Legislative Assembly as the Labor member for Warrandyte. He served until his defeat in September 1988. He continued to practice as a Barrister.

He was appointed as a Victorian Magistrate and Coroner in 1989 and sat in all jurisdictions. He was a part-time chairperson of the Victorian Parole Board from 2013 to 2016.

He retired from the Magistracy in 2022. He now practices as a Nationally Accredited Mediator.

He lives on the shores of the Gippsland Lakes and is an active member of the Gippsland Lakes Yacht Club.

Victorian Legislative Assembly
Preceded by Norman Lacy	Member for Warrandyte; 1982–1988	Succeeded by Phil Honeywood
