= Phil Honeywood =

Australian politician

The Honourable Phil Honeywood

Member of the Victorian Legislative Assembly for Warrandyte
- In office 1 October 1988 – 25 November 2006
- Preceded by: Lou Hill
- Succeeded by: Ryan Smith

Deputy Leader of the Opposition in Victoria
- In office August 2002 – March 2006
- Premier: Steve Bracks
- Leader: Robert Doyle; Ted Baillieu

Minister for Tertiary Education and Training
- In office 3 April 1996 – 20 October 1999
- Premier: Jeff Kennett
- Preceded by: Haddon Storey
- Succeeded by: Lynne Kosky

Parliamentary Secretary to the Minister for Ethnic Affairs
- In office 1992–1996
- Premier: Jeff Kennett

Personal details
- Born: 26 April 1960 (age 65) Sydney
- Party: Liberal Party

Phillip Neville Honeywood (born 26 April 1960) is a former Australian politician.

== Early life ==
Born in Sydney, he received his Higher School Certificate in 1977 and the following year was a Rotary Youth Exchange student to Gakushuin High School in Tokyo. He was an executive for International Express Company in Japan in 1982, and was executive assistant to the chief executive officer of Gosford City Council in 1983. In 1984 he received his Bachelor of Arts (Honours) from the Australian National University in Canberra.

== Career ==
In 1985 he became an Industrial Relations Officer with Shell Australia in Melbourne, and in 1986 became president of the Malvern branch of the Young Liberals, and was also a member of the Liberal Party's Youth Affairs Policy Committee. He was finance director of the Young Liberal Movement in 1987.

== Politics ==
In 1988 he was preselected as the Liberal candidate for the marginal Labor-held state seat of Warrandyte in Victoria. He was successful in winning the seat, becoming the only Liberal candidate to defeat a Labor incumbent member in that election. When the Coalition won government in Victoria in 1992 under Jeff Kennett, he became Parliamentary Secretary to the Minister for Ethnic Affairs until 1996, when he was promoted to the ministry as Minister for Tertiary Education and Training. When the Coalition lost government in 1999 he became Shadow Minister for Education, moving to Multicultural Affairs for part of 2002, and Employment and Industry in 2002. In 2002 he became Deputy Leader of the Opposition, holding various shadow ministerial positions including Environment, Scrutiny of Government and Policy Coordination. He stood down as Deputy Leader in March 2006 and retired at the election in November.

Since retiring from full-time politics in 2006, Honeywood was Marketing Director and CEO at Stott's Business College and Cambridge International College in Melbourne, Australia. Honeywood also served two terms on the Governing Council of Swinburne University of Technology.

Honeywood became Chief Executive of the International Education Association of Australia (IEAA) in November 2011. Phil is currently a member of the TEQSA Advisory Council, New Colombo Plan Steering Committee, Education Visa Consultative Committee and the Coordinating Council for International Education. He is also a volunteer adviser to the Bennelong Philanthropic Foundation.

Political offices
Preceded by Haddon Story	Minister for Tertiary Education and Training; 1996–1999	Succeeded by Lynne Kosky
Parliament of Victoria
Preceded by Lou Hill	Member for Warrandyte; 1988–2006	Succeeded by Ryan Smith
