= Ryan Smith (Australian politician) =

Australian state politician

The Honourable Ryan Smith
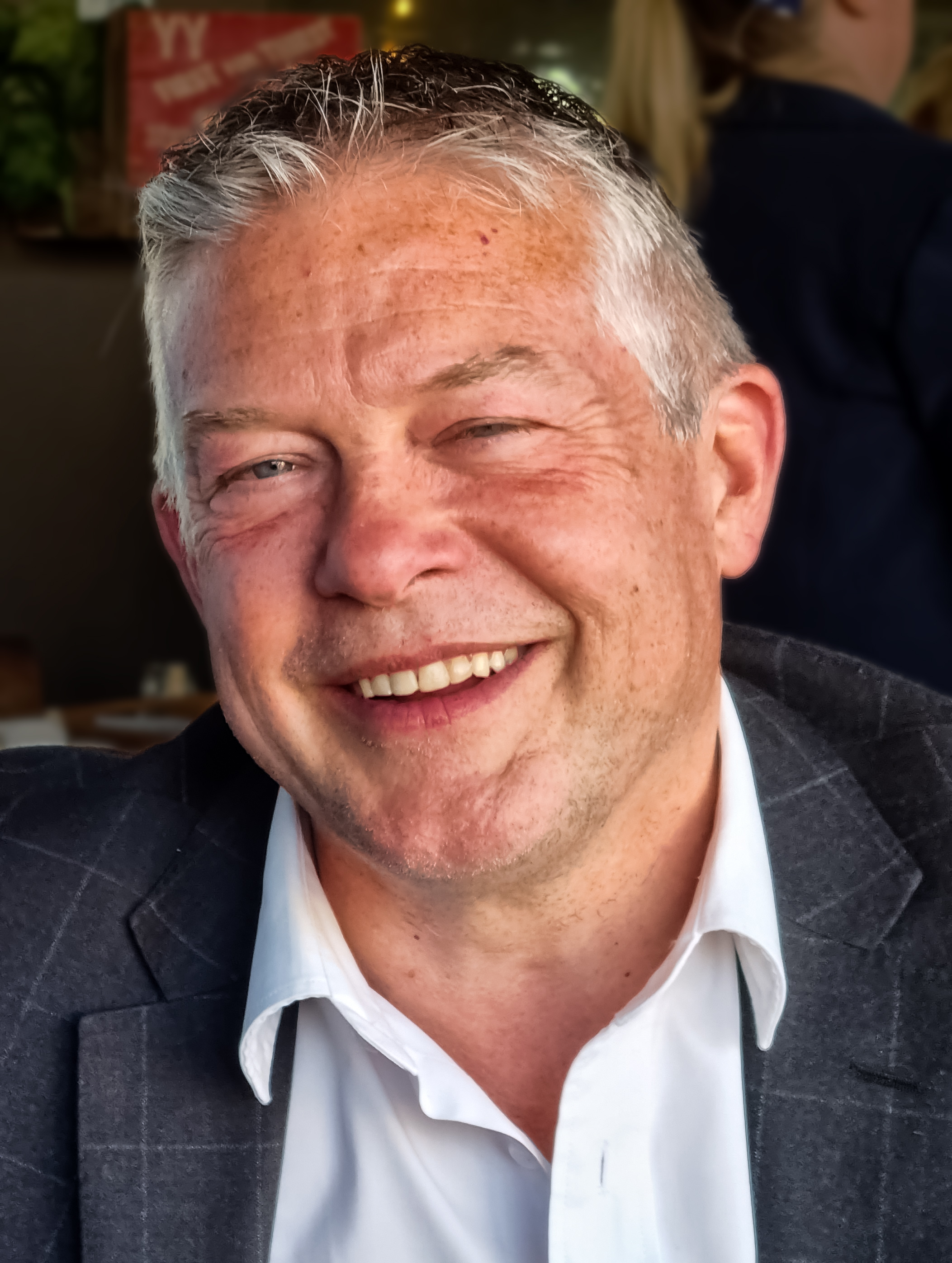
- Smith in 2022

Member of the Victorian Legislative Assembly for Warrandyte
- In office 25 November 2006 – 7 July 2023
- Preceded by: Phil Honeywood
- Succeeded by: Nicole Werner

Minister for Environment and Climate Change
- In office 2010–2014
- Premier: Ted Baillieu; Denis Napthine
- Succeeded by: Lily D'Ambrosio

Minister for Youth Affairs
- In office 2010–2014
- Premier: Ted Baillieu; Denis Napthine
- Succeeded by: Gavin Jennings

Personal details
- Born: 2 April 1969 (age 57) Greensborough, Victoria
- Party: Liberal Party

Ryan James Smith (born 2 April 1969) is an Australian politician. He was a Liberal Party member of the Victorian Legislative Assembly from 2006 to 2023, representing the electorate of Warrandyte. He was Minister for Environment and Climate Change and Minister for Youth Affairs from 2010 to 2014, serving in both the Baillieu and Napthine governments.

== Career ==
Smith worked in various roles in financial services prior to entering politics, including as a treasury officer for North Limited from 1989 to 1992, a currency dealer for the National Australia Bank from 1992 to 1994, a treasury officer for BP Finance from 1994 to 1999, a finance officer for Orica from 1999 to 2000, a foreign exchange specialist for Suncorp Metway from 2000 to 2002, and as a manager with the Commonwealth Bank from 2003 to 2006. He was elected to the Legislative Assembly at the 2006 state election, succeeding retiring veteran Liberal MP Phil Honeywood. He was shadow parliamentary secretary for environment and the arts from 2008 to 2009, before being promoted to the shadow ministry, serving as Shadow Minister for Industrial Relations and Shadow Minister for Manufacturing from 2009 to 2010. Upon the Liberal-National victory at the 2010 election, Smith was appointed Minister for Environment and Climate Change and Minister for Youth Affairs. Smith lost his ministerial responsibilities following the defeat of the Liberal-National coalition at the 2014 Victorian state election.

During 2014 Lisa Neville, a Labor MP, accused Smith of insulting her. Smith rejected the claim.

In 2015 Smith voted for banning anti abortion protesters from protesting outside abortion clinics.

Smith voted against legalising abortion in Victoria during 2008. In December 2014 Ryan Smith was appointed Shadow Minister for Roads until 2017 when he was made Shadow Minister for Cost of Living and Shadow Special Minister of State.

After the Liberal party loss during the 2022 Victorian state election, Smith announced his candidacy for the 2022 Liberal Party of Australia (Victorian Division) leadership election. A few days later he would withdraw and announce his support for Brad Battin for the leadership election.

On 31 May 2023, he announced that he would resign from parliament on 7 July, to take up a job in the corporate sector. He said his reasons included discomfort with the growing negative tone of politics.

== Personal life ==
Smith was born in Greensborough and was educated at Lilydale High School. Smith is married and has two children.

Victorian Legislative Assembly
Preceded by Phil Honeywood	Member for Warrandyte; 2006–2023	Succeeded by Nicole Werner
