= Doug Rankin =

Australian rules footballer, born 1915

Personal information
- Full name: Edwin Douglas Rankin
- Born: 21 December 1915; Geelong, Victoria
- Died: 7 January 1987 (aged 71)
- Original teams: Guild Scouts, Geelong
- Height: 183 cm (6 ft 0 in)
- Weight: 81 kg (179 lb)

Playing career^{1}
Years	Club	Games (Goals)
1938–1939	Geelong	9 (8)
- ^{1} Playing statistics correct to the end of 1939.

Edwin Douglas Rankin (21 December 1915 – 7 January 1987) was an Australian rules footballer who played with Geelong in the Victorian Football League (VFL).

Rankin was the son of Teddy Rankin, a former Geelong player who made 180 VFL appearances for the club. Doug's half brothers, Cliff and Bert, both also played over 100 games with Geelong. Other members of the Rankin family also played for Geelong.

A Guild Scouts recruit, Rankin played nine games for Geelong as a forward, five in the 1938 VFL season and four in the 1939 season. In April 1939 he suffered a serious knee injury, from which he struggled to recover.
