= Cliff Rankin =

Australian rules footballer

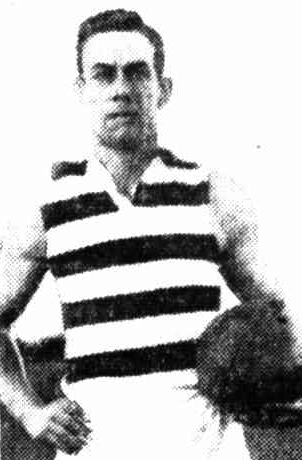

Personal information
- Full name: Clifford Egerton Laure Rankin
- Born: 4 December 1896; Geelong, Victoria
- Died: 12 February 1975 (aged 78); Geelong, Victoria
- Original team: Chilwell
- Height: 175 cm (5 ft 9 in)
- Weight: 69 kg (152 lb)
- Position: Forward

Playing career^{1}
| Years | Club | Games (Goals) |
| 1915, 1919–1928 | Geelong | 153 (399) |

Coaching career
| Years | Club | Games (W–L–D) |
| 1925–1927 | Geelong | 57 (45–12–0) |
- ^{1} Playing statistics correct to the end of 1928.

Career highlights
- Geelong captain-coach 1925–1927; 14-time state representative; 1925 Geelong premiership captain-coach; 1921 VFL Leading Goalkicker Medal; Four-time Geelong Leading Goalkicker (1920–1923); Geelong Team of the Century (Emergency)

Cliff Rankin (4 December 1896 – 12 February 1975) was an Australian rules footballer, who played for the Geelong Football Club in the Victorian Football League (VFL) from 1915 to 1928.

== Football career ==
Nicknamed "Ticker", his father Teddy and brother Bert both played football for Geelong as well as a number of other members of the Rankin family.

Despite making his debut in 1915, Rankin did not play a full season until 1920 due to World War I, when he served as a gunner in France. While with the army he even represented the Australian Imperial Force in the rival code of rugby, playing as the fullback of the Australian team, which defeated the New Zealand All Blacks.

After the war, Rankin kicked 48 goals in 1920 to finish the season as Geelong's top goal-kicker. The following season he again topped their goal-kicking with 63 goals, which set a then club record for most ever goals in a season. It was also the highest tally by any player in the league that year for the home-and-away season and included a bag of ten goals against Fitzroy. In total, Rankin won Geelong's leading goal-kicker award on four separate occasions. During a game in the 1924 season, as Cliff Rankin was shooting for goal, Arthur Hando of South Melbourne was seen shaking the posts in order to increase the chances of the ball hitting the goal post, an action for which Hando was subsequently censured by the league.

Rankin captained-coached Geelong from 1925 until 1927, steering them to 1925 premiership in his first year in charge. He led from the front in the Grand Final with five goals.

A regular Victorian interstate representative, Rankin appeared in 14 games for his state, kicking 30 goals. He was captain of the state team in 1926. In that year, he controversially criticised the spiteful play of the Western Australian team.

Rankin was named as an emergency in Geelong's official 'Team of the Century'.

== Personal life ==
Rankin married Evelyn Beckham in 1921. He worked as a gasfitter. His great-grandson, Gary O'Donnell, played for the Essendon Football Club in the 1990s.
