= Bert Rankin =

Australian rules footballer

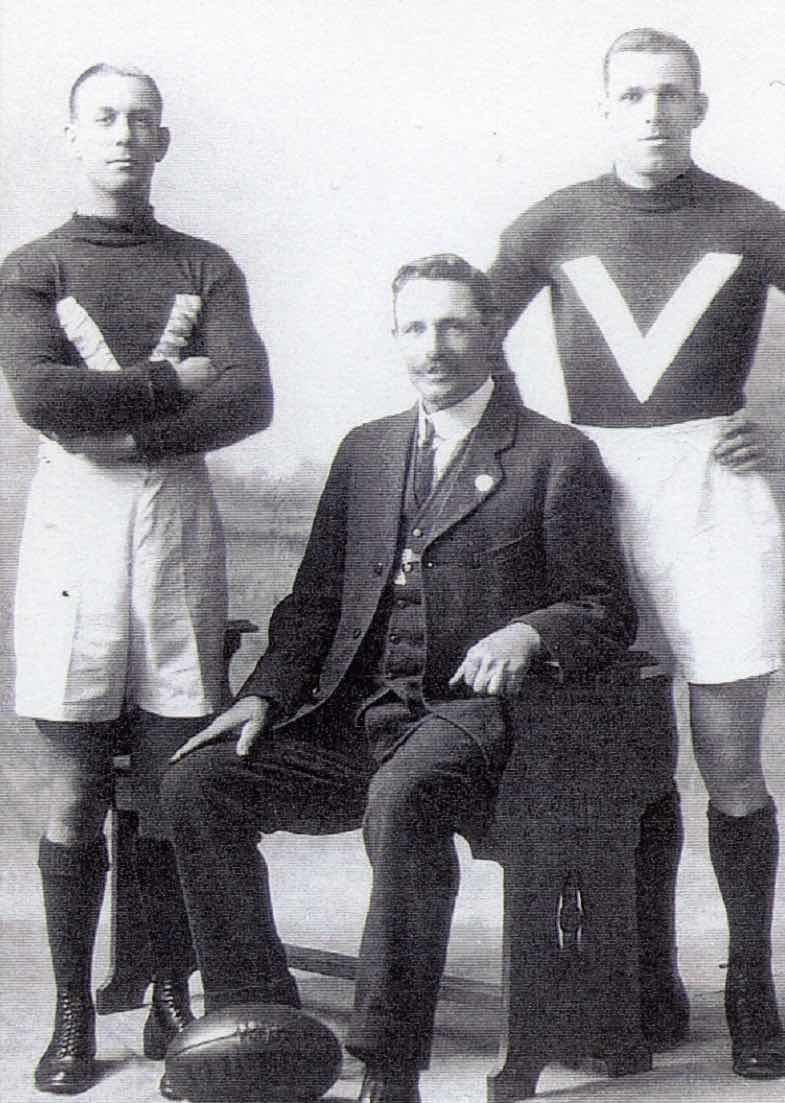
- Cliff and Bert Rankin standing with their father, Edwin "Teddy" Rankin, on the occasion of the sons' selection in the 1923 Victorian state team

Personal information
- Full name: Albert Vivian Rankin
- Born: 17 February 1893; Geelong, Victoria
- Died: 20 June 1971 (aged 78); Dimboola, Victoria
- Original team: Chilwell (GDFA)
- Height: 178 cm (5 ft 10 in)
- Weight: 77 kg (170 lb)

Playing career^{1}
Years	Club	Games (Goals)
1912–1923	Geelong	132 (21)
1924-25, 1928-36	Dimboola	? (?)
1926	Wycheproof	? (?)
1927	Beechworth	? (?)
- ^{1} Playing statistics correct to the end of 1936.

Albert Vivian Rankin (17 February 1893 – 20 June 1971) was an Australian rules footballer who played with Geelong in the Victorian Football League (VFL). His brothers Cliff and Doug as well as his father Teddy and other members of the family played league football for Geelong.

Rankin started his career as a forward, but played most of his football as a centreman. A player with exceptional pace, he was also a regular user of the drop kick. In 1917 he won Geelong's best and fairest award. He captained Victoria at interstate football in 1922 and then Geelong in 1923. His brother Cliff was vice captain. This was the first time in VFL history that a pair of brothers filled both positions at the same time. It turned out to be Bert Rankin's last season in the league as, controversially, he lost his spot in the side during the finals and walked out on the club. His brother, Cliff, refused to take the field in support of his brother.

He is credited with suggesting that Geelong adopt the nickname of the Cats. Rankin made his senior VFL debut one year and 320 days after the retirement of his father; a VFL/AFL record.

After the disappointment of the 1923 season, Rankin left Geelong to coach the Dimboola Football Club and led them to a Wimmera Football League premiership in 1929. Rankin also played in Dimboola's 1928 premiership side, which was coached by Leo Wescott and was still playing for Dimboola in 1936.

In 1915, Rankin married Winifred Hornsey. He died in Dimboola in 1971.

Rankin was the secretary of the Dimboola Agricultural and Pastoral Society for at least 15 years from 1928 onwards.
