= Mawarra =

Heritage-listed house and gardens in Melbourne, Victoria, Australia

- Location of the house and gardens in Greater Metropolitan Melbourne
- Interactive map of the Mawarra area
- Former names: The Grove

General information
- Status: Completed
- Type: House and gardens
- Architectural style: Arts and Crafts (house); Classic Italian Renaissance (garden)
- Location: 6 Sherbrooke Road, Sherbrooke, Yarra Ranges, Melbourne, Victoria, Australia
- Coordinates: 37°52′56″S 145°21′44″E
- Completed: 1925; 101 years ago
- Client: Mrs A. W. McMillan, and; The Misses Marshall

Technical details
- Material: Timber; cement-sheet; tiles; glass; stone
- Grounds: 1.128 ha (2.79 acres)

Design and construction
- Architect: Harold Desbrowe-Annear
- Other designers: Edna Walling (gardens)

Victorian Heritage Register
- Official name: Mawarra
- Type: Registered place
- Designated: 10 May 2012
- Reference no.: H2300
- Heritage overlay no.: HO18
- Category: Parks, Gardens and Trees

Register of the National Estate
- Official name: Marwarra Garden
- Type: Defunct register
- Designated: 14 May 1991
- Reference no.: 17283

Mawarra is a house and gardens located at 6 Sherbrooke Road in Sherbrooke, in the Yarra Ranges, in the north eastern suburbs of Melbourne, in Victoria, Australia. Mawarra comprises a house designed in 1925–1927 and attributed to Harold Desbrowe-Annear, and a garden designed in 1932 by Edna Walling, a prominent and influential garden designer.

Built on the traditional lands of the Kulin nation, the house and gardens were added to the Victorian Heritage Register on 10 May 2012 in recognition of their historical, aesthetic, scientific (botanical), and architectural significance; and, on an unknown date, was also added to a non-statutory list by the Victorian branch of the National Trust, and to the now defunct Register of the National Estate on 14 May 1991.

== History ==
Originally known as The Grove, the c. 1.4-hectare (3-acre) property, Mawarra, was developed for three sisters, Mrs A. W. McMillan and the Misses Marshall, in the popular Dandenong Ranges. They appear to have commissioned Desbrowe-Annear, a noted architect, to design a large house in the mid-1920s and some five years later they engaged Walling to design extensive gardens. By the time of their involvement at The Grove, both Desbrowe-Annear and Walling had established themselves as fashionable and prolific designers. After a disagreement between Walling and the sisters, the garden was completed by Eric Hammond, Walling's principal contractor, who was retained to finish constructing the garden and its extensive stonework. As was common at the time, the sisters hosted a number of fundraising events at the property in the 1940s, before selling the house in 1960. Walling became friends with the subsequent owners, and was highly complimentary of their care of the garden. The property changed hands in 2002 and again in 2010.

== Description ==
=== House ===
The garden provided a setting for the existing 1920s Arts and Crafts style house which incorporated features typical of the work of Desbrowe-Annear. It is a timber and cement-sheet house with tiled roof, half timbering, windows contained within the strapping, random-coursed stone chimneys and a bowed north wall. An east-facing cantilevered balcony, supported on over-sized brackets, is positioned to provide a panoramic view of the countryside and garden.

=== Gardens ===
The 1.128-hectare (3-acre) garden was designed for the Misses Marshall in 1928–1929 by Walling and constructed by Hammond. The garden is located on a steep hill in rich loamy soil. The design is based on a Classic Italian Renaissance pattern with a main axis plunging down a steep hill with terraces of different character at right angles to this axis, running across the slope. The garden has a strong architectural form with massive flights of stairs, ramps, pergolas and geometric ponds. The whole is softened by a very delicate planting system. The paths which run at right angles to the main axis path are given a special generic planting style and the character is reinforced with names such as Birch Walk and Nut Walk. Although the garden has a formal structure reinforced by formally planted cupressus sempervirens and a hedged rose garden, planting throughout is predominantly informal.

The extensive garden was designed to use the established axis of the house and the sloping site, by the use of terraces, steps, decorative pools and stone walling. Formal architectural design, similar to that of the Italian Renaissance, was used to create a series of rooms, or pictures, and the illusion of space within the overall composition. A central stairway, leading from the house to a reflecting pool below, provides the spine of the garden and enables access to five parallel terraces that run across the site, each of which was given its own distinctive character. Carefully constructed stone walls, steps and stairways are a feature of the garden including the symmetrical walled house terrace with curved stone walls and stepped ramps either side. A tennis court was built to the north-east of the site, a sun dial positioned adjacent to the house and a small cottage, Wendy Cottage, was constructed to the north of the main house by the late 1930s. Reputedly based on the playhouse for Princesses Elizabeth and Margaret, built in 1932 at Royal Lodge, this cottage remains.

Walling described Mawarra as a 'symphony in steps and beautiful trees' and the structure of the garden is strengthened and enhanced by the carefully positioned trees and shrubs. The garden has a woodland character and uses a diverse variety of trees and shrubs, herbaceous plants and bulbs, evergreen, deciduous and conifer plants, many displaying spectacular autumnal colour, and a variety of leaf shapes and variegations, and plant forms. The planting is dominated by maples, oaks, beeches, magnolias, silver birches, tulip trees, linden, lilly pilly, Douglas firs, and dogwoods.

The formality of the garden is strengthened by the planting of pairs of trees and shrubs either side of the paths and steps, and the garden spaces. The dense planting creates a series of garden rooms between the terraces, through which the pathways pass to give a sense of discovery. These include a pond area, a silver birch stand under planted with bluebells, an orchard, herbaceous border, Wendy Cottage and formal garden, nursery and tennis court. Along the main garden axis are pairs of plants, beginning with upright Irish Yews, Kalmia latifolia, Cedrella sinensis, and the uncommon Pearl Bush (Exochorda racemosa), a pair of large Purple Beech at the top of the stairs which are framed by dwarf conifers, azaleas, mollis azalea, Japanese maples, and camellias. The garden features many of Walling's signature plants, including viburnum, philadelphus, spiraea, berberis, cotoneaster, mahonia, corylus, camellia, aucuba, amelanchier, malus, kolkwitzia, clethera, rhododendron, and hydrangea.

== See also ==
- Architecture of Melbourne
- List of gardens in Victoria
- List of places on the Victorian Heritage Register in the Shire of Yarra Ranges
