= Harold Wyndham =

Director of Education in new south wales

Sir Harold Wyndham CBE (27 June 1903 – 22 April 1988) was Director-General of Education in New South Wales between 1952 and 1968. He chaired the committee whose report (referred to as "The Wyndham Report") led to the Education Act 1961 which completely re-organised secondary education in NSW.

== Early life and background ==
Wyndham was a great-grandson of Wadham Wyndham. His grandfather Alexander Wyndham (d.1915) arrived in Australia in the 1850s with a sizeable inheritance but within 20 years the fortune had been spent, lent or otherwise lost.

Harold Stanley Wyndham was born in Forbes, New South Wales on 27 June 1903, first child to Agnes Effie (née Finigan) and Stanley Charles Wyndham. His mother Effie died in June 1908, a short time after the arrival of her third child, Norman. The children were cared for by their aunt Rachel, Effie's younger sister, whom Stanley later married. Rachel urged that the family be moved to Sydney to ensure the children could receive a more rounded education. Rachel and Stanley had a son Robert. Harold's sister Kathleen founded Wadham Preparatory School and his brother Norman became a noted Sydney-based surgeon.

Harold married Beatrice Margaret (Margaret) Grieve in 1936 and moved to the Sydney suburb of Roseville in 1937 where the couple raised three sons, Philip, John and David, all of whom attended the academically selective North Sydney Boys High School. Wyndham died of a heart attack in Roseville on 22 April 1988.

== Education ==
Wyndham attended Fort Street High School and graduated in arts at the University of Sydney in 1924. In 1925 he was awarded a Diploma in Education, winning the Peter Board Prize. He served for 8 years as a teacher in Primary schools and as a member of staff of Sydney Teachers College.

In 1928 he graduated Master of Arts (1st Class honours in History). In 1932 he won the NSW Teacher's Federation travelling scholarship and the Carnegie Travel Grant to the USA where he studied at Stanford University in California. He earned his Doctorate in Education in 1934. During World War II he served with the Royal Australian Air Force as a Flight Lieutenant and was involved in the early stages of the Commonwealth Reconstruction Training Scheme and the re-establishment of disabled ex-servicemen.

== Career and the "Wyndham Report" ==
In 1935 Wyndham was appointed as the first research officer for the Department of Education. In 1946 he was appointed Staff Inspector, Secretary in 1948 and Deputy Director-General in 1951. In November 1952 he became Director-General of Education

In 1954 he was appointed to chair a committee tasked to completely review the Secondary education system in New South Wales and make recommendations for improvements to be implemented. The committee's report, popularly referred to as "The Wyndham Report", was presented to the Minister in October 1957. The report gave rise to the Public Education Act of 1961 and was brought into effect in 1962. Key amongst the changes was the objective of presenting all students with the opportunity to experience a wide range of subjects, including visual arts, industrial arts, music and drama, and a wide range of languages. The Five-year Secondary School system was abandoned in favour of adding another year to the course, with major statewide external examinations at the end of the tenth (School Certificate) and the twelfth (Higher School Certificate) years of schooling.

When Wyndham was appointed as Director-General of Education there were 455,000 students in the NSW Education system, of whom 100,000 were in Secondary schools; By 1968 there was over 244,000 students in secondary school of whom 64% could be expected to complete the Higher School Certificate.

== Public life ==
Wyndham devoted much of his life to public service outside of his role in the Department of Education. In 1945 he led the Australian delegation at the conference which created UNESCO and was a member of the Australian delegation to UNESCO in 1958 and again in 1966. In 1959 he represented Australia at the Commonwealth Education Conference at Oxford and again in New Delhi in 1962. He was a Fellow of the Royal Institute of Public Administration and a Fellow and President (1963–1965) of the Australian College of Educators. He was Chairman of the NSW State Library Board, NSW State Archives Authority, Secondary Schools Board, Board of Senior School Studies, Board of Teacher Education, Sydney Symphony Orchestra Advisory Committee and Intellectually Handicapped Standing Committee amongst others. He was a member of the Senate of the University of Sydney, Council of the University of New South Wales, Council of the University of New England, Council of Macquarie University, Technical Education Advisory Council and the Sydney Opera House Trust. In 1961 Wyndham was appointed a Commander of the Order of the British Empire for "services to education in NSW" and in 1969 appointed a Knight Bachelor.

Government offices
Preceded by John McKenzie	New South Wales Director-General of Education; 1952 – 1968	Succeeded by David Verco
Professional and academic associations
Preceded by Sir James Darling	President of the Australian College of Educators; 1963 – 1965	Succeeded by Charles Moorhouse
