= Desmonde Downing =

Australian stage designer (1920–1975)

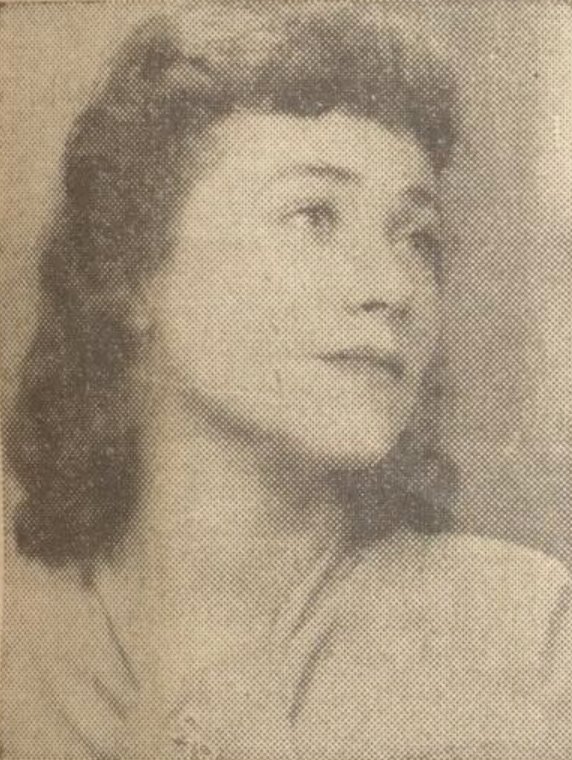
- Downing in 1949
- Born: Desmonde Florence Downing; 26 November 1920; Neutral Bay, New South Wales, Australia
- Died: 11 July 1975 (aged 54); Manly, New South Wales, Australia
- Education: East Sydney Technical College; Julian Ashton Art School

Desmonde Florence Downing (26 November 1920 – 11 July 1975) was an Australian set and costume designer. Known as Desmonde Downing and sometimes Des Downing, she was mentioned in despatches for her war service in Papua New Guinea.

== Early life and education ==
Born on 26 November 1920 at Neutral Bay, New South Wales, Desmonde Florence Downing was the eldest child of Violet Hester (née Sadler) and engineer Frank Hammersley Downing. She was educated at Meriden Church of England Grammar School in Strathfield on a scholarship and completed the Intermediate there. Next she enrolled in commercial art at the East Sydney Technical College in 1937.

== Career ==
In the late 1930s, Downing was working as a solicitor's clerk at Allen, Allen & Hemsley in Sydney. She enlisted in the 16th Australian Camp Hospital in December 1942 to train as a nursing orderly, transferring to the Australian Imperial Force in April 1943. She saw service in Australia, then, in 1945 she was flown first to Bougainville and later to Lae. At the end of the war her services were considered "essential. Retained until 30/10/46". She was discharged in November 1946 and mentioned in despatches for her service with the Australian Army Medical Women's Service in Bougainville, gazetted on 6 March 1947.

She took advantage of the Commonwealth Reconstruction Training Scheme and enrolled in painting at the Julian Ashton Art School and in theatre studies with Doris Fitton at the Independent Theatre. This led to her designing costumes and sets for the stage, while also taking part in some of the plays.

== Death and legacy ==
Downing died of cancer at Manly, New South Wales on 11 July 1975.
