= Bickleigh Vale =

Heritage-listed real estate subdivision in Melbourne, Victoria, Australia

- Location of the village in Greater Metropolitan Melbourne
- Interactive map of the Bickleigh Vale area
- Alternative names: Bickleigh Vale Village; Bickleigh Vale Estate
- Etymology: Bickleigh, South Hams

General information
- Status: Completed
- Type: Real estate subdivision
- Architectural style: Garden suburb; Federation Arts and Crafts
- Location: Mooroolbark, Yarra Ranges, Melbourne, Victoria, Australia
- Coordinates: 37°47′27″S 145°19′50″E
- Completed: 1890; 136 years ago

Technical details
- Material: Local stone; shingles; timber
- Grounds: 10 ha (25 acres)

Design and construction
- Other designers: Edna Walling

Website
- bickleighvale.com.au

Site notes
- Public access: No. Private properties; Open days held by public notice

Victorian Heritage Register
- Official name: Bickleigh Vale
- Type: Registered place
- Designated: 25 March 2004
- Reference no.: H2053
- Heritage overlay no.: HO75
- Categories: Residential buildings (private); Education

Register of the National Estate
- Official name: Bickleigh Vale
- Type: Defunct register
- Designated: 21 October 1980
- Reference no.: 5700

Bickleigh Vale, also known as Bickleigh Vale Village and the Bickleigh Vale Estate, is a ten-hectare (twenty-five-acre) (Note: One source states that the area is 24 ha (59 acres); However, it is most likely a typographical error, referring to 24–25 acres, not hectares.) garden suburb real estate subdivision, sometimes referred to as a village, located in Mooroolbark, in the Yarra Ranges, in the north eastern suburbs of Melbourne, in Victoria, Australia.

Created by Edna Walling from the 1920s on the traditional lands of the Wurundjeri Woi Wurrung people, the Federation Arts and Crafts-styled estate was added to the Victorian Heritage Register on 25 March 2004 in recognition of its aesthetic (landscape), scientific (horticultural), historical and architectural significance; and was also added to non-statutory lists by the Victorian branch of the National Trust on 12 December 1995 and the now defunct Register of the National Estate on 21 October 1980.

== History ==
Edna Walling was born in England in 1895 and spent her formative years in the village of Bickleigh in Devon. Aged 19 years in c. 1914, she arrived in Australia, via New Zealand, with her family; and obtained gardening qualifications from Burnley College in 1917. In the 1920s, as Australia's first female land developer, Walling began to create the garden village on the outskirts of Mooroolbark. In c. 1921, Walling acquired one hectare (three acres) and built a cottage called Sonning – named after the village of Sonning on the River Thames – and a studio called The Cabin. After a fire in 1935, Sonning was completely rebuilt.

After building Sonning, Walling purchased another 7.4 hectares (18 acres) and sold subdivisions of this land only to people who were prepared to accept designs for a cottage and garden prepared by her, until the 1950s, whilst subsequent subdivision has created more than thirty properties. The design of all allotments in the first few decades was closely controlled by Walling, and part of the Sonning garden was used by Walling as a nursery from which plants were supplied to purchasers. Many of Victoria's most influential landscape designers, including Eric Hammond, Ellis Stones, and Glen Wilson, gained experience working in the village.

Walling lived in Bickleigh Vale for most of her working life, living in Sonning and, from 1951, The Barn. In 1967, Walling moved to Buderim, Queensland. Walling's only other completed garden estate was in Mount Kembla in New South Wales.

== Description ==
Bickleigh Vale is a landscaped village of approximately 10 hectares (25 acres) that contains gardens, houses, and other buildings, created in the 1920s. It is an extraordinary experiment in urban development, well ahead of its time, and has become a place of pilgrimage for many of Walling's followers.

The landscape character is of densely planted trees and shrubs across the gently undulating topography into which cottages and roads were constructed. The mature enclosed landscape allows only glimpses of the cottages and houses behind the plantings and sloping land. The planting is diverse and includes old remnant gums, and introduced evergreen trees and shrubs that provide contrasts of leaf and flower colour, and form and texture throughout the seasons. The landscape design includes stone walls, steps, ponds, arbours, flagstones and gravel drives, and richly planted gardens. Low front fences of timber, stone or wire occur, and some properties have place names fixed to gates or fences. An important feature of the village is the use of wire fences covered in shrubs and climbers to provide a continuous uninterrupted landscape amongst the cottages and houses.

John Patrick, a leading contemporary Australian landscape architect, wrote in 2021:

"The village has a wonderful sense of community and use of vegetation, especially the trees, which is particularly important with the current climate change. If town planners had continued to use this style of landscaping, we may not have the plethora of McMansions seen today. Edna used many different styles of landscape design, but at Bickleigh Vale she created a softer, more natural effect that I think is very beautiful. However, the residents do have a problem with trying to achieve a sense of balance so that many of the plants that were popular in Edna’s time, such as cotoneaster and some of the prunus, don’t become weeds. That is a difficulty."

— John Patrick, landscape architect, 2021.

=== Plantings ===
The landscape retains indigenous Blackwood (Acacia melanoxylon) and gums, including Eucalyptus macrorhyncha, E. rubida, E. goniocalyx, E. melliodora, E. obliqua, E. ovata, E. radiata, E. cephalocarpa, and E. viminalis. Exotic plants were introduced into the remnant vegetation and include conifers, deciduous and evergreen trees, shrubs, perennials and bulbs, and many Australian natives that are a feature of Walling gardens. Of the larger growing trees there are numerous pines (Pinus), oaks (Quercus), cypress (Cupressus), cedar (Cedrus), elms (Ulmus), poplars (Populus), ash (Fraxinus) and gums (Eucalyptus and Corymbia). The earliest introduced plantings were pines, and numerous Monterey Pines (Pinus radiata) occur along Pine Road and Bickleigh Vale Road, and throughout the estate. Also along Bickleigh Vale Road are several uncommon Bishop's-cone Pine (Pinus muricata). Other conifers of contrasting form have been planted including Monterey Cypress (Cupressus macrocarpa), Golden Cypress (C. macrocarpa 'Horizontalis Aurea'), Bhutan Cypress (C. torulosa), Mexican Cypress (C. lusitanica), Smooth-barked Arizona Cypress (C. glabra), with blue-green foliage, and the narrow crowned Italian Cypress (C. sempervirens).

The Walling 'signature' plants widely planted at Bickleigh Vale include Acacia, Acer palmatum, Acmena, Abelia, Amelanchia, Arbutus, Betula, Berberis, Buddleja, Buxus, Camellia japonica, Camellia sasanqua, Carpinus, Catalpa, Chaenomeles, Chimonanthus, Choisya, Cornus, Cotinus, Cotoneaster, Crataegus, Diospyros, Duetzia, Eleaegnus, Enkianthus, Forsythia, Hydrangea, Jasminum, Kerria, Kolkwitzia, Laurus, Leptospermum, Ligustrum, Liquidambar, Liriodendron, Lonicera, Malus, Magnolia Nandina, Osmanthus, Philadelphus, Photinia, Pittosporum, Populus, Prostanthera, Prunus, Prunus lusitanica, Pyracantha, Pyrus, Rhaphiolepis, Spiraea, Syringa, Viburnum, Wisteria; and Helleborus, Anemone, Agapanthus, Viola, rose cultivars and numerous bulbs, including Nerine, Ixia, Sparaxis, Narcissus, Hyacinthoides, Leucojum, Iris, and Muscari.

=== Structures ===
Walling's own home Sonning and her studio, The Cabin (now Sarn), were both designed by Walling in what she termed 'the English style'. Sonning was rebuilt in 1936 following the destruction of Sonning I in a fire. Other houses and outbuildings that were designed or approved by Walling include Badgers Wood, The Barn, Bena Lodge, Braemark, The Cabin, 112 Cardigan Road, Cornerways, Devon Cottage, Downderry, Glencairn, Hurst, Lynton Lee, Mistover, The Sheilan, Sonning, Wimborne, Winty, a cottage at 11 Bickleigh Vale Road, a guest cottage and workshop at 138 Cardigan Road (formerly part of Braemark), a garage, a workshop, and a shed. All have a harmonious combination of design elements such as rustic stone on lower levels, dark stained shingles on upper gable ends, simple multi-paned casement windows, dormer windows, prominent stone chimneys, and French doors opening onto patios with attached stone and timber pergolas.

Although some of the original allotments have been re-subdivided and many newer houses have been constructed, it retains Edna Walling's original design intention. Due to its unique planning and its unitary style, the estate takes the form of a small village. It contains both the original cottages and many more recent houses. It is distinguished from the surrounding area by its prolific vegetation. Both private gardens and roadsides (particularly Bickleigh Vale Road) contain a profusion of well established trees and shrubs. Both private gardens and roadsides contain a profusion of well established trees and shrubs.

== See also ==
- List of gardens in Victoria
- List of places on the Victorian Heritage Register in the Shire of Yarra Ranges
