= Mooroolbark College =

Location
- 186 Manchester Rd, Mooroolbark; Mooroolbark, Victoria; Australia; 37.7742°S 145.3142°E

Information
- Type: Co-educational public
- Motto: A place to inspire discovery, to value and to seize opportunity
- Established: 1973
- Principal: Ann Stratford
- Enrollment: 1182
- Colours: Green, navy and white
- Website: www.mooroolbarkcollege.vic.edu.au

Mooroolbark College is a government secondary school situated in Victoria, Australia, near the Dandenong Ranges and the Yarra Valley. It has a student population of around 1,160 (fluctuating between 1,100 and 1,200).

The school operates a house system across all year levels. Vertical homegroups allow senior students to provide leadership and role models for younger students. The houses are recognised by colours, and each has its own name: Biik House (red), Baan House (blue), Ngawan House (yellow), and Darrang House (green).
