= Meriden School =

Location
- Strathfield, Sydney, New South Wales; Australia; 33°52′25″S 151°5′30″E

Information
- Type: Independent single-sex early learning, primary, and secondary day school
- Motto: Latin: Semper fidelis (Always faithful)
- Denomination: Anglicanism
- Established: 1897; 129 years ago
- Founder: Jane Monckton
- Educational authority: New South Wales Education Standards Authority
- Principal: Lisa Brown
- Years: Early learning and K–12
- Gender: Girls
- Enrolment: 1650
- Colours: Navy blue, blue and white
- Affiliations: Association of Heads of Independent Girls' Schools; Alliance of Girls' Schools Australasia; Junior School Heads Association of Australia; Association of Heads of Independent Schools of Australia
- Brother school: Trinity Grammar School
- Website: www.meriden.nsw.edu.au

Meriden, An Anglican School for Girls is an independent Anglican single-sex early learning, primary, and secondary day school for girls, located in Strathfield, an Inner West suburb of Sydney, New South Wales, Australia.

Founded in 1897 by Jane Monckton, the school has a non-selective enrolment policy and currently caters for approximately 1650 students from early learning, through Year K to Year 12.

Meriden is affiliated with the Association of Heads of Independent Girls' Schools (AHIGS), the Alliance of Girls' Schools Australasia, the Junior School Heads Association of Australia (JSHAA), and the Association of Heads of Independent Schools of Australia (AHISA).

== History ==
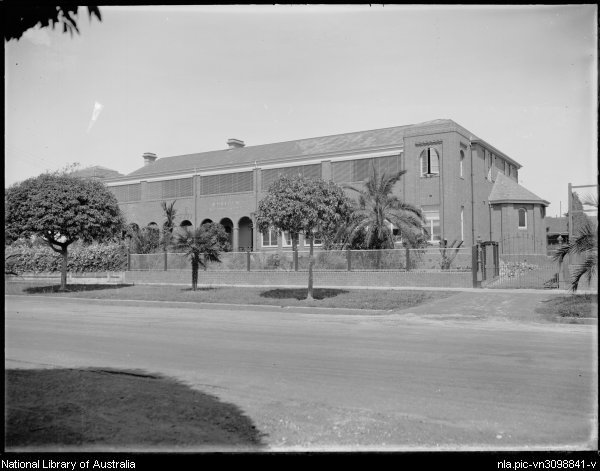
The main wing at Meriden after the 1936 redevelopment designed by Thomas Pollard Sampson that retained a portion of The Briars.

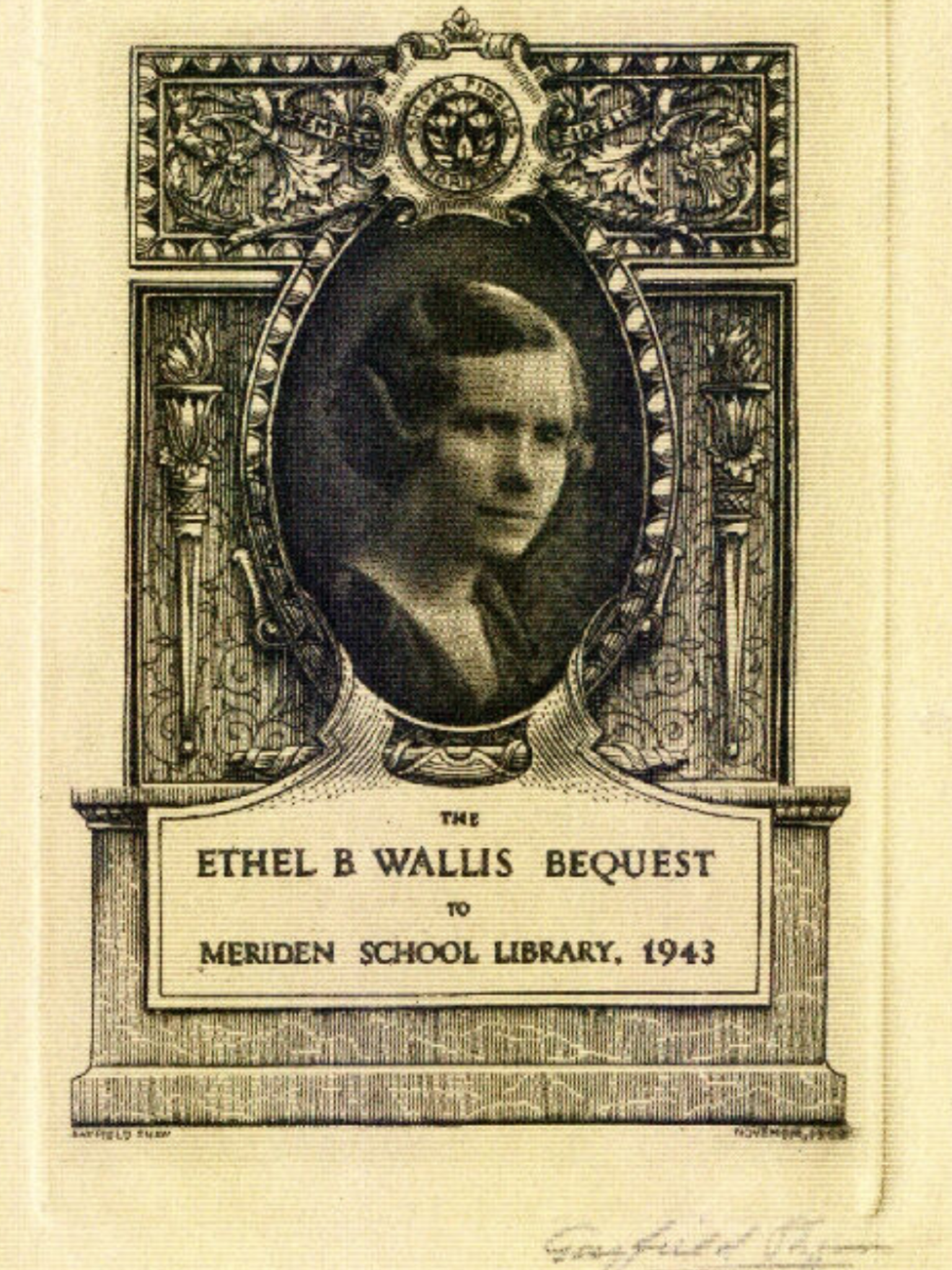
Frederick Wallis Mayor of Strathfield in 1923 & 1924, and his family, were generous donors to Meriden.

Administratively operating as an Australian company limited by guarantee since 17 March 1997, Meriden was founded by Jane (Jeannie) Monckton in 1897, at Agnes Street, Strathfield. Monckton had decided to educate her two sons at home due to a lack of suitable educational facilities for boys in the Strathfield area. Friends and neighbours asked to have their children join the two boys under her instruction, and so it was decided to establish Meriden, a school with approximately 19 students and two staff to assist. Boarding facilities were available and fees for tuition were from 1½ guineas ($3.15) to 2 guineas per quarter for the regular curriculum, which included English, French, Latin, Mathematics, Australian History, Music, Needlework and Dancing. In 1907, Meriden moved to Woodward Avenue, where it was sold to Bertha Turner in 1908. Turner continued at Woodward Ave until larger premises could be found near Santa Sabina College on the Boulevarde, moving again soon after to its current location in the original Redmire Estate, on Redmyre Road. The school expanded in 1914 with the purchase two properties, The Briars, located adjacent to Meriden, and the original site at Redmyre Road.

In 1918, following the 1916 changes to Department of Education requirements, Turner approached the Sydney Church of England Girls' Grammar School (SCEGGS) in Darlinghurst with the concept of amalgamation. Further negotiations were however prevented due to financial commitments, and the SCEGGS Council suggested that a group of local church people might be interested. The first school uniform and the school logo were introduced in 1921, and in 1922 the Meriden flag was presented by the Old Girls' Union.

As Turner's health deteriorated, there was a suspicion that the school might close, and subsequently, a group of local people met to discuss the future of Meriden. It was agreed that a Council should manage the school, and debentures were sold in order to obtain the necessary finance. The original home, Wariora, which was owned by Turner, was not included in this transfer but remained her property. On her death, Wariora was transferred to her brother, who sold it on to the gardener and his wife, who in turn ran it as a boarding house. Wariora was eventually purchased by Meriden and was extended to include the school tuck shop. This building has since been demolished.

After Turner's death, Grace Ovary was appointed by the Council as the new Headmistress. In 1927, sports practice was carried out at the cow pastures in the grounds of a ruined mansion named Milroy in Broughton Road, Strathfield. The end of this decade saw a growing and profitable school.

In 1936, additions were made to the school with the erection of Wallis Hall, seating 450 people. The new building, designed by Thomas Pollard Sampson, encased the existing residence, The Briars, that had become the centre of the school with a new red brick facade along Redmyre Road. The additions included an octagonal chapel forming an apsidal end to the main building with quatrefoil stained glass windows. A library, dormitories, bathrooms and classrooms were part of the development. This building, with further additions, is still the main wing of the school.

In 1961, a brick-faced Edwardian-style mansion, Selbourne, facing Redmyre Road, became part of the school campus. It housed domestic staff for the boarding house students until it was demolished in 1978 for sports grounds. Originally known by different spelling, Selborne, the house was the family home of George A. Wilson, chairman of the Public Service Board of NSW until the death of his wife Philippa Marion Wilson in 1900. Selbourne became the home of the Walsord family in the first two decades of the 1900s and became the Earwaker family home in the 1927.

In 1942, Meriden temporarily became the home of two schools as the Presbyterian Ladies' College (PLC), from the nearby suburb of Croydon, was occupied by the Royal Australian Air Force for the purpose of establishing a top secret Radar Unit. Meriden offered to accommodate the PLC boarders and the school's singing, domestic science, and physical education classes. The PLC Principal, Dr Helen Wilkie, recommended that further integration between the two schools should not proceed, and the PLC boarders left.

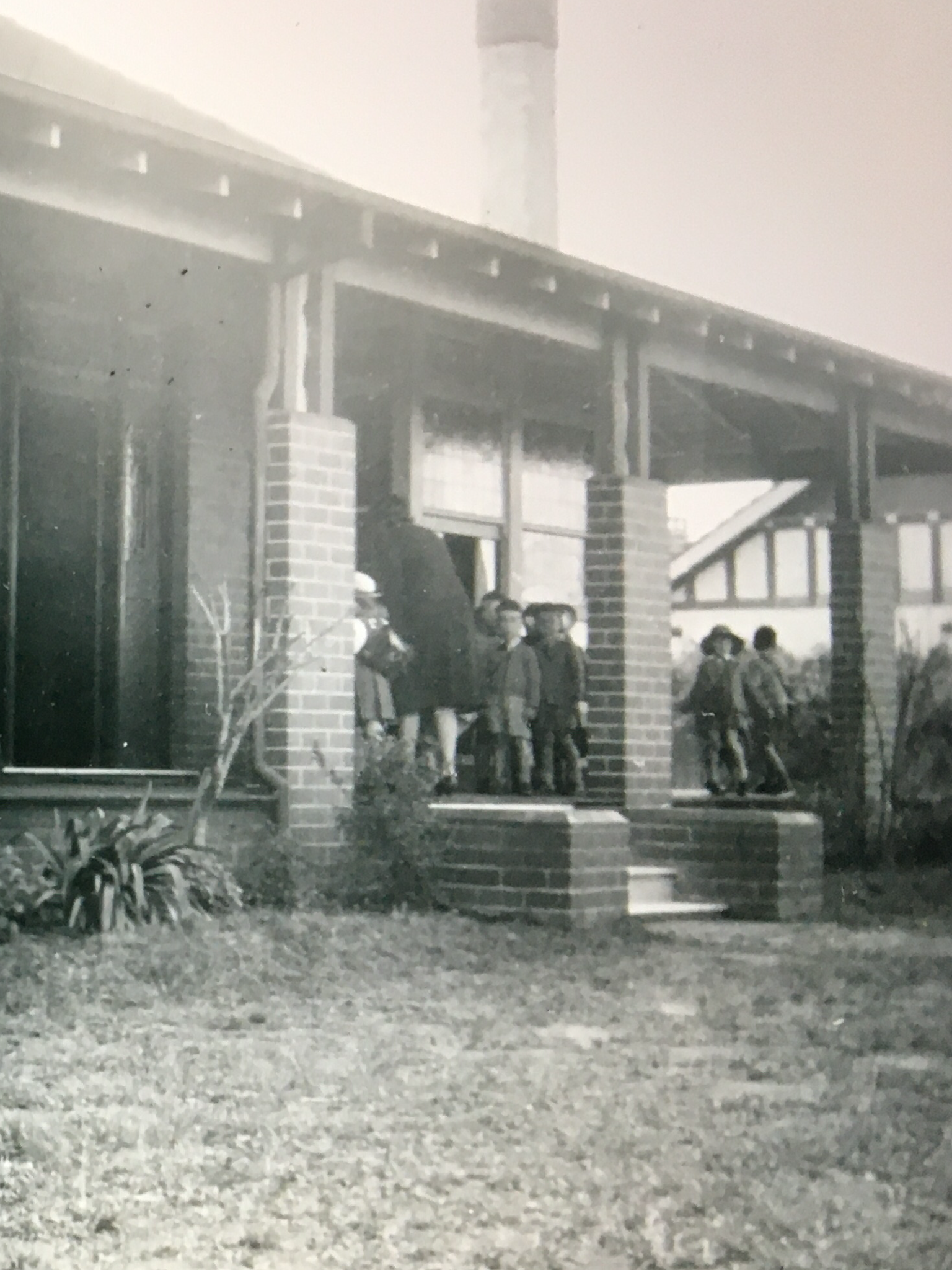
Wadham in Wallis Avenue Strathfield was purchased by Meriden in 1957 and served as a sub–primary branch of the school until 1967.

In 1957, Meriden purchased Wadham Preparatory School an independent day, co-educational, preparatory school located at 9–11 Wallis Avenue, Strathfield. The school had been established in 1943 by Kathleen Wyndham. The site was used as a sub-primary campus principally for girls, but also for nursery and kindergarten boys. In 1967 Meriden closed the Wadham campus having purchased land for its entire junior school in Redmyre Road, Strathfield. After its closure, the building was demolished and two large 1970s style face-brick houses now stand in its place.

In 1979, as with numerous other schools at the time, Meriden closed its boarding facility due to a steady decline in enrolments.

The Greenhalgh Centre for Music and Drama (named for former principal Dr Julie Greenhalgh), was opened in 2022, and a new Design and Creative Arts Building opened for use in 2025.

== Principals ==
Period	Details
1897–1908	Jeannie Monckton, Founder
1908–1925	Bertha Turner
1926–1940	Grace Overy
1941–1957	Elsie Hannam
1958	Acting Principal – Eleanor Colborne
1959–1961	Evelyn James
1961–1965	Joy Fox
1966–1984	Sheila Morton (dec'd. 7 August 2012)
1985–2002	Denise Thomas
2003–2006	Carolyn Blanden
2006	Acting Principal – Denise Thomas
2007–2022	Dr Julie Greenhalgh
2023-now	Mrs Lisa Brown

== School crest ==
Meriden's crest was designed by the school's art teacher, Mr Albert Collins, in 1921. The crest features Meriden's motto of Semper fidelis (translated from Latin as "always faithful"), together with a representation of the lilies of Parnassus. In ancient Greece, Mount Parnassus was regarded as the mountain sacred to the muses and the centre of the earth. The muses were said to preside over the realm of learning, with each having a special province, such as poetry, science or history.

== House system ==
Meriden School's original house system was established in 1931 by the headmistress at the time, Miss Overy, who named the houses after English counties. The original four houses were:

- Warwick (Yellow)
- Cumberland (Blue)
- Kent (Green)
- Sussex (Red)

In 2014, two more houses were introduced to meet the need for improved house-based pastoral care. In line with tradition, the new houses were named after English counties that are famous for their universities. The two new houses were:

- Oxford (Orange)
- Durham (Purple)

Each year, students in each house are to vote for their new Year 11 house leaders – the House Captain who is supported by the Service Officer, Arts Officer, Chapel Officer and Sports Officer. Through the house system, students participate in inter-house competitions in order to gain points for their house. Competitions include the Athletics Carnival, Swimming Carnival, House Choral Competition, House Arts Competition, Inter-house Sport Competition and Inter-house Maths Competition. The house with the most points at the end of the school year is awarded the Wallis Cup. In 2024, it was announced by Headmistress Lisa Brown that four more houses will be added to accommodate the growth of the school:

- Lincoln (Hot pink).
- York (Burgundy).
- Cambridge (Teal).
- Norfolk (Navy).

== Associated schools ==
Meriden's brother school is Trinity Grammar School at Summer Hill, an Anglican day school for boys.

== Old Girls ==
=== Education and community ===
- Silma Ihram – education pioneer
- Robin Morrow – lecturer, critic and editor in children's literature and president of the Australian section of the International Board on Books for Young People IBBY Australia.

=== Entertainment, media and the arts ===
- Kath Carr – garden designer
- Pamela Clark – cooking editor, editorial and food director of the Australian Women's Weekly
- Kellie Crawford – singer and actress, Teen Queens and Hi-5
- Patti Crocker – actress and author of Radio Days
- Barbara Davidson – printmaker who specialised in etching
- Desmonde Downing – stage designer
- Sarah Monahan – actress on Hey Dad..!
- Natalie Tran – vlogger, actress, comedian and writer, known by the handle communitychannel
- Nadia Wheatley – writer, journalist
- Claire McCarthy – screenwriter, director, producer, and visual artist

=== Law ===
- Elizabeth Broderick – lawyer and former Sex Discrimination Commissioner

=== Government and politics ===
- Elaine Cassidy – former mayor
- Betty Davy – teacher and activist
- Eve Dutton – former mayor
- Anne Aly – Labor Party member of the Australian House of Representatives
- Catherine West – Labour Party member of the House of Commons of the United Kingdom

== See also ==
- List of non-government schools in New South Wales
- Wadham Preparatory School
