= Elaine Cassidy (mayor) =

Australian teacher and politician

Councillor Elaine Cassidy

Mayor Municipality of Woollahra
- In office September 1988 – September 1989
- Preceded by: Susan Collett
- Succeeded by: Hylda Rofe

Deputy Mayor of Woollahra
- In office September 1987 – September 1988
- Preceded by: Susan Collett
- Succeeded by: Margaret Carter

Personal details
- Born: 15 March 1930 Strathfield, New South Wales
- Died: 21 February 2014 (aged 83) Orange, New South Wales
- Spouse: Derek Cassidy QC
- Education: Meriden School; Macquarie Secretarial School; University of Sydney
- Occupation: Teacher

Elaine Armgard Cassidy (15 March 1930 – 21 February 2014) was a socially prominent Australian teacher and municipal politician. She served as Mayor and Deputy Mayor in the local government area of the Municipality of Woollahra in Sydney. Cassidy compiled and edited a Bicentennial book on the Eastern Suburbs of Sydney.

== Birth and education ==
Cassidy (née Hirstman) was born in Strathfield, New South Wales, and was the first of two children of Margot (née Ludwig) and Frank Hirstman. She attended Meriden School and Macquarie Secretarial School, and then studied arts at the University of Sydney. She turned her focus to education and started teaching.

== Working life ==
=== Teaching ===
Frensham School at Mittagong was her first appointment, teaching geography, history and English to senior students. In her second year on staff, Cassidy became an economics teacher. In that year two of her Leaving Certificate students were placed first and third in the state in economics. After travelling abroad, and having children, she returned to teaching; first as a relief teacher at Kambala and then, from 1970 until 1974, teaching economics at Ascham.

=== Public Relations ===
During the late-1950s, in London Cassidy joined a public relations firm and specialised in fashion and theatre work. After her return to Sydney in 1960, she undertook the role of executive secretary and public relations officer for the fund-raising appeal to build the Sydney Opera House. She worked in that position until midway through her first pregnancy.

== Community work ==
For two decades, Cassidy raised funds for the Royal Prince Alfred Hospital and King George V Hospital appeals committees. She was president of the Friends of the Australian Opera (now Friends of Opera Australia) and in 1963 was the inaugural treasurer of the Women's Committee of the National Trust of Australia (New South Wales). In that role she role she was involved is setting up Lindesay, Darling Point, as the headquarters of the committee. Cassidy was a council member of the Benevolent Society for 16 years from 1990 and served as chairman of the management committee of the Royal Hospital for Women prior to its move from Paddington to Randwick. She was chairwoman of HMAS Rushcutter until the Commonwealth Government transferred the site to state ownership for public recreational use.

== Municipal government ==
Cassidy was elected to the Woollahra Municipal Council in 1979 and was elected Deputy Mayor in September 1987 and Mayor in September 1988. She served on the council until 1995. For six years, she was a member of the executive of the Local Government Association.

== Marriage and family ==
In 1961, she married Derek Cassidy, the son of Sydney Queen's Counsel Jack Cassidy and his wife Elaine (later Sir Jack and Lady Cassidy). The couple met at a bridge table during a blizzard in Thredbo. The wedding was at St. Swithun's Church, Pymble and the bride wore a pinky beige guipure lace gown specially woven to order in Switzerland. The union produced two children. Cassidy died on 21 February 2014 and was survived by her husband, Derek Cassidy QC, daughters, Edwena and Belinda, and three grandchildren. Continuing her interest in competitive duplicate bridge, she achieved gold life master status.

== Portraits ==
Photographic portraits of Cassidy as a councillor and mayor are held by the Woollahra History Centre.

== Honours ==
- January 2001 – Centenary Medal for her services to the community.

== Publications ==
- Impressions of Woollahra, past and present (Sydney : Published on behalf of the Woollahra Bicentennial Community Committee by Allen & Unwin, 1988.)
