= Mooroolbark, Victoria =

Suburb of Melbourne, Victoria, Australia

Mooroolbark
- Suburb
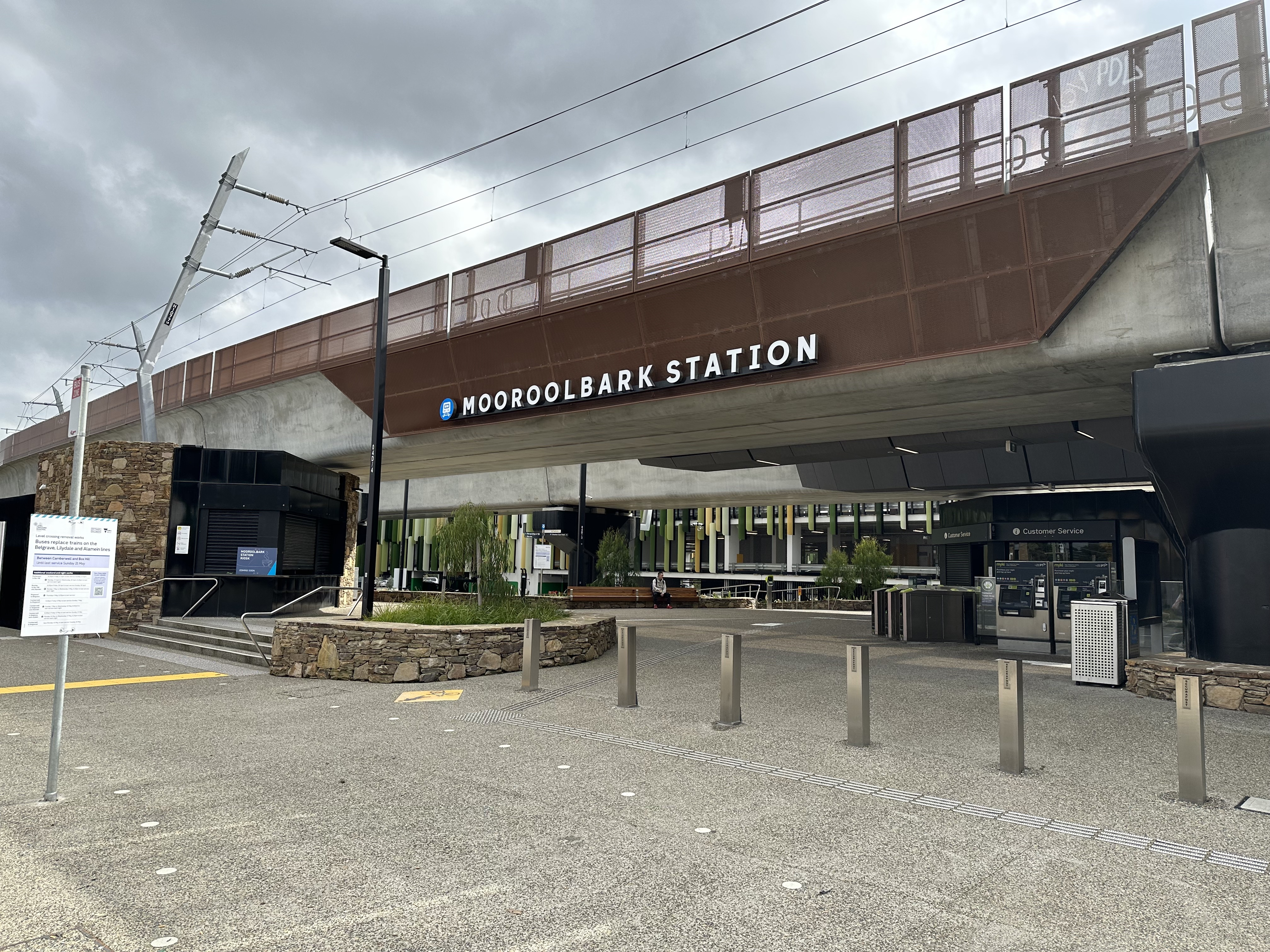
- Mooroolbark Station in April 2023

- Interactive map of Mooroolbark
- Coordinates: 37.785°S 145.315°E
- Country: Australia
- State: Victoria
- City: Melbourne
- LGA: Shire of Yarra Ranges
- Location: 37 km (23 mi) from Melbourne; 6 km (3.7 mi) from Lilydale

Government
  - State electorates: Croydon; Evelyn
  - Federal division: Casey

Area
  - Total: 13.3 km^{2} (5.1 sq mi)

Population
  - Total: 23,059 (2021 census)
  - Density: 1,734/km^{2} (4,490/sq mi)
- Postcode: 3138
Suburbs around Mooroolbark
Croydon North	Chirnside Park	Lilydale
Croydon	Mooroolbark	Lilydale
Croydon	Kilsyth	Montrose

Mooroolbark is a suburb of Melbourne, Victoria, Australia, 37 km East of Melbourne's central business district, located within the Shire of Yarra Ranges local government area. Mooroolbark recorded a population of 23,059 at the 2021 census.

Mooroolbark is at an elevation of approximately 93 metres.

== History ==
"Mooroolbark" has been popularly believed for some time to have the meaning "red earth", leading to extensive use of that meaning in the community. More recently it has been suggested that "Mooroolbik" is the name given by the local Wurundjeri Aboriginal people ("moorool" meaning great water and "bik" meaning place). An alternative meaning of Mooroolbark being "the place where the wide waters meet" is recorded by Museum Victoria. Another meaning recorded is "red bark".

The Parish of Mooroolbark was surveyed in 1855, with a township originally called Brushy Creek standing where North Croydon is today. The name "Mooroolbark" was to be popularised with eventual European settlement in the late 19th century. A rural hub developed around the train station, which opened in 1887 and offered rail access to Melbourne. The Post Office opened shortly after on 15 March 1888.

Wonga Park used to be a part of Mooroolbark until the early 20th century when it became a separate suburb. Another locality called Mooroolbark Park was later renamed as Chirnside Park.

=== Heritage listing ===
The following place in Mooroolbark is listed on the Victorian Heritage Register:

- Bickleigh Vale, also known as Bickleigh Vale Village and the Bickleigh Vale Estate, a 10-hectare (25-acre) garden suburb real estate subdivision

== Transport ==
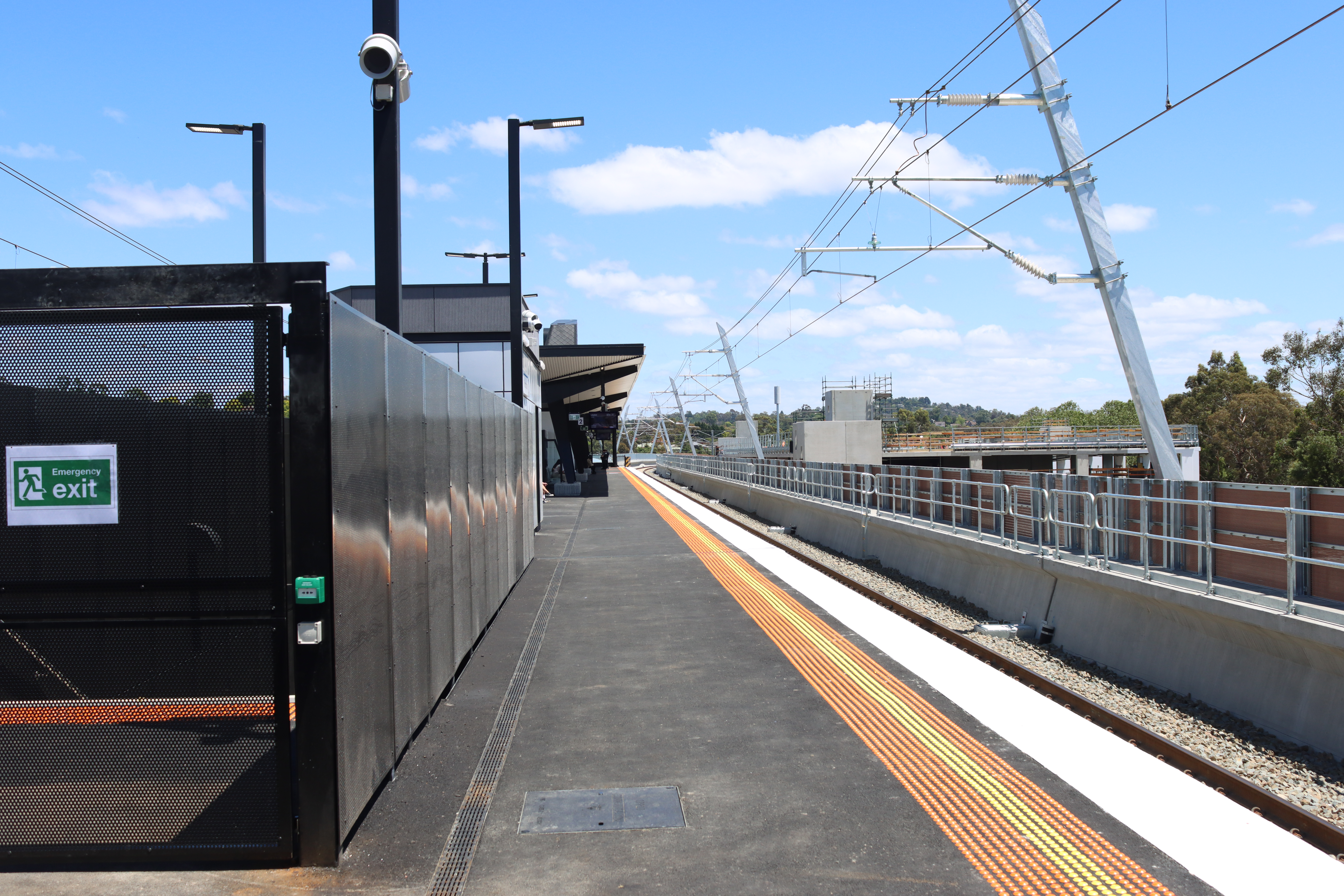
Mooroolbark railway station in November 2021

Mooroolbark has a train station which is on the Lilydale railway line. It has 900 car parking spaces. The station was rebuilt in 2021 as part of the Level Crossing Removal Project.

=== Bus routes ===
A number of bus routes serve the Mooroolbark area, and FlexiRide services, where passengers can request to be picked up or dropped off from home, also operate in the area. All services are operated by Ventura Bus Lines. Curiously for a Melbourne suburb, none of the buses which serve Mooroolbark run on Sundays, with the sole exception of the 664 which is more than a kilometre north of the railway station. Additionally, the FlexiRide services only run limited hours, falling well below the Victorian Government's minimum service standards.

Bus routes 664, 675, 680 and 689 and two FlexiRide routes service Mooroolbark. (All but 664 & 689 stop at the station)

664: Knox City Shopping Centre to Chirnside Park Shopping Centre (seven days)

675: to Chirnside Park Shopping Centre (Monday to Friday)

680: to Lilydale (Monday to Friday)

689: Croydon to Montrose (Monday to Saturday)

Mooroolbark FlexiRide (Monday to Saturday)

Croydon FlexiRide (Monday to Saturday)

=== "Five Ways" ===
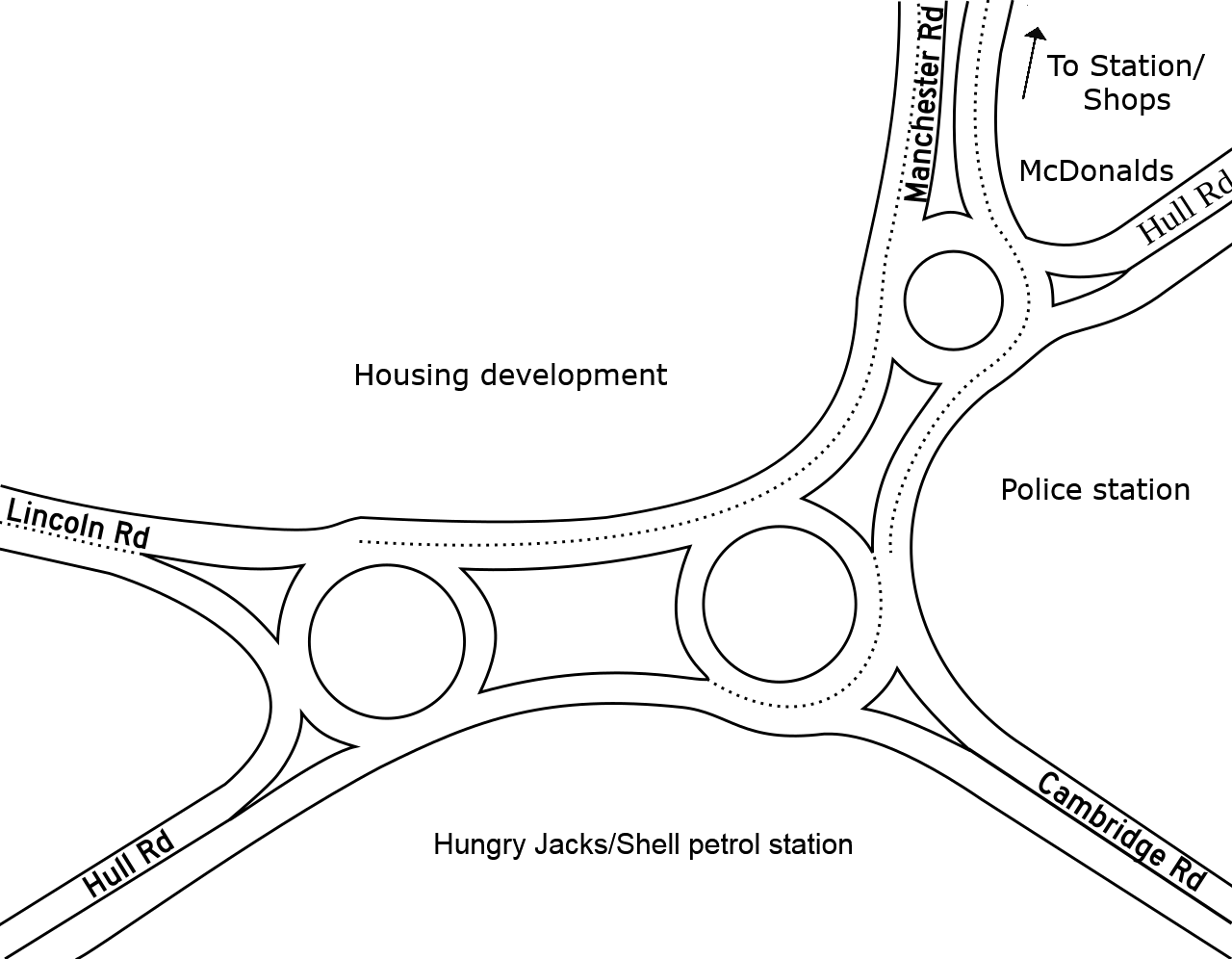
Map of the "Five Ways" intersection in Mooroolbark

Located in Mooroolbark is one of Melbourne's most unusual intersections between Hull Road, Lincoln Road, Manchester Road and Cambridge Road: three consecutive roundabouts (pictured). Initially, the three latter streets simply connected to Hull Road at close, but slightly different, locations. In order to eliminate the troubles caused by vehicles failing to give way to those coming from other adjoining streets, it was decided to build individual roundabouts at each intersection, and employ the standard 'give way' road rules. This has cleared up most of the troubles on Hull Road (southwest to northeast), but the prospect of passing through the intersection for those who don't know it may be a little daunting. This intersection is usually referred to by locals as "Five Ways" or "The Mooroolbark Roundabouts".

== Shopping district ==
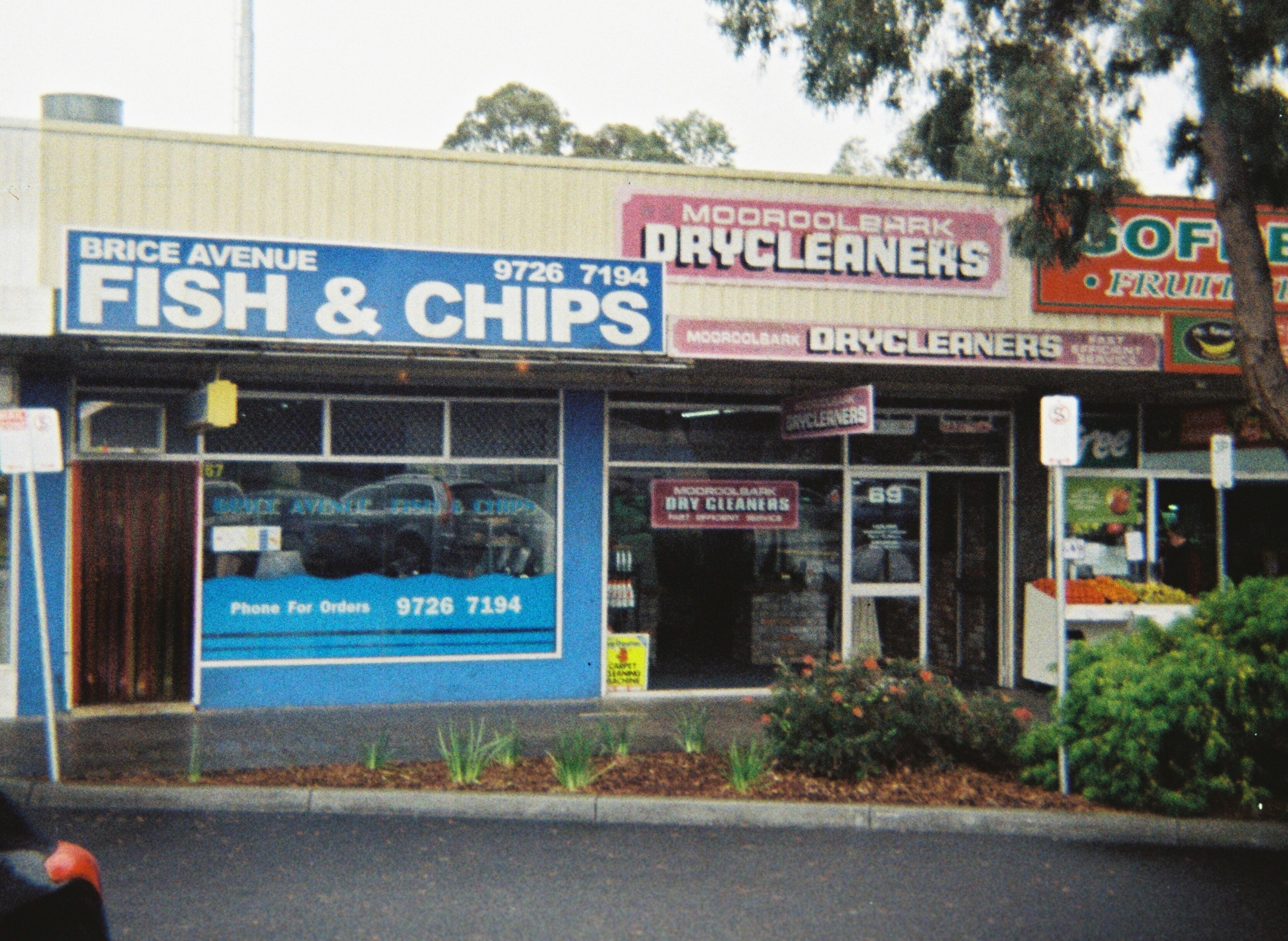
Shops in Mooroolbark

The main shopping district is located along Brice Avenue and Manchester Road, featuring a Coles supermarket, two gymnasiums, two pharmacies, fast food franchises, cafés, hair salons and thrift shops. Mooroolbark also has a tavern and wine bar.

The shopping strip on the north side of Brice Avenue was developed by the Masaga Group in the mid-1960s on land leased from Victorian Railways.

== Police station ==
Mooroolbark has a 24-hour police station. It is located at the corner of Hull and Cambridge Roads ("Five Ways"), 700 metres from the Mooroolbark train station and town centre.

== Schools ==
There are a number of primary and secondary schools within Mooroolbark offering a choice between government and private education.

=== Government schools ===
- Bimbadeen Heights Primary School
- Manchester Primary School
- Mooroolbark East Primary School
- Pembroke Primary School
- Rolling Hills Primary
- Mooroolbark College
- Yarra Hills Secondary College

=== Private schools ===
- Billanook College
- St Peter Julian Eymard Primary School
- Mooroolbark Grammar (formerly Yarralinda Primary School)

== Community Centre & Places of Interest ==
Another point of interest within Mooroolbark is the Mooroolbark Community Centre, which has undergone radical changes since 2004 as part of a civil beautification and anti-graffiti project. The community centre is now surrounded by colourful mosaics and street art, including a stencil art representation of Mooroolbark's most famous citizen, the early 20th Century landscape designer Edna Walling. In 2025, the Mooroolbark Community House was established and is located in the Mooroolbark Community Centre.

The first Blue Light Disco in Australia was held in Mooroolbark in 1976. The 'Blue Light Disco', specifically a local Victoria Police initiative, is now a well-known attraction for teenagers Australia-wide.

The Mooroolbark library, a branch of Your Library, is located at 7 Station Street. It offers a variety of events, including storytimes for preschool children. The library is next to Hookey Park, a children's adventure park.

== Places of worship ==
- Mooroolbark Baptist Church
- Saint Margaret's Uniting Church
- Saint Peter Julian Eymard Catholic Church
- Mooroolbark Neighbourhood Church
- Mooroolbark Christadelphians

== Brushy Creek ==
Most of Mooroolbark is in the catchment of Brushy Creek, a tributary of the Yarra River. A number of environmental concerns exist because of its location almost entirely within an urban environment.

== Community festivals ==
From 1980 to 2001, Mooroolbark had the 'Red Earth Festival', usually on the third or fourth weekend of March every year beginning on Friday evening and running all day Saturday and Sunday. The 'Red Earth Festival' had many stores and amusement rides. The highlights of that festival included a parade on the Saturday, which began in the grounds of the former Mooroolbark Primary School (which closed at the end of 2004) and went down Brice Avenue towards the fairground. On the Sunday, the festival hosted an open-air market followed by a fireworks display at night. Due to a number of problems including falling attendances and a significant increase in insurance premiums, the Red Earth Festival ran for the last time in March 2001.

Since 2002, there has been a smaller festival known as 'Celebrate Mooroolbark', at around the same time of the year.

== Sport ==
Mooroolbark Soccer Club "The Barkers" - founded as a Dutch team with the name Mooroolbark United Soccer Club in 1962, Mooroolbark's backing changed to a British influenced club in its formative years. In 1978 the United tagline was dropped from the name. The club's claim to fame is as Victoria's (and Australia's) first national sporting club side. Mooroolbark enabled the National Soccer League to proceed, breaking the deadlock which was then in force between the budding national league and clubs from Victoria whom the Victorian Soccer Federation had forbidden to join the competition.

Mooroolbark Football Club "The Mustangs" - Compete in Division 1 of the Eastern Football League. Their home ground is known as Heights Reserve, Longfellow Dr, Mooroolbark. Both Seniors and Juniors are represented by the club, with two junior girls teams joining the Club in 2017.

== Air monitoring ==
Mooroolbark has an EPA 'Air Monitoring Station'. It measures Carbon Monoxide (CO) Nitrogen Dioxide (NO²) Ozone (O³) Particles. Monitoring began on Monday, 8 April 2002. Data is compiled by EPA Victoria.

== Notable people ==
- Rebecca Barnard, an Australian singer-songwriter who fronted the band Rebecca's Empire
- John Gardiner, a 19th-century grazier
- Heath Hocking, an Australian rules footballer who played for Essendon
- Sam Mitchell, an Australian rules footballer
- Barney McAll, an ARIA award-winning jazz musician who released an album called Mooroolbark in 2015
- Edna Walling, an early 20th-century landscape designer

== See also ==
- Mooroolbark Soccer Club
- Mooroolbark railway station
