= Betty Davy =

Australian teacher (1919–2010)

Betty Davy (September 1919 – September 2010) was an Australian teacher who is credited with playing a "pivotal role" in the introduction of the NSW Senior's Card.

== Biography ==
Davy, whose mother was a teacher at Sydney Technical College, was born in September 1919. She grew up in Strathfield, New South Wales, and attended Meriden School. She studied English and History at the University of Sydney, and gained an educational degree from Sydney Teachers College. She taught at various schools until she got married, and in the late 1960s returned to teaching.

Davy was associated with the Liberal Party since the 1940s, and was secretary of the party's Women's Council in the 1980s. With Betty Combe and Betty Grant, she was praised for her "tireless and uncompromising work". Through the Council she was able to propose a Senior's Card for New South Wales residents, which was introduced in 1992, and is cited as "among the enduring achievements of the Greiner-Fahey Government". She was awarded a medal of the Order of Australia for her community service.
