= Barbara A. Davidson =

Australian artist

- Born: Barbara Anne Abbott; 26 July 1928; Summer Hill, New South Wales, Australia
- Died: 7 November 2022 (aged 94); Double Bay, New South Wales, Australia
- Education: Meriden Church of England School for Girls; East Sydney Technical College
- Known for: Etching & works on paper
- Spouse: George Madgwick Davidson AM
- Children: 2 sons 1 daughter
- Father: Dr J H Abbott
- Relatives: Grandfather; Joseph Abbott

Barbara Anne Davidson (26 July 1928 – 7 November 2022) was a New South Wales–born Australian artist who worked in a variety of print media including etching, lithography, collagraph and artists books. She was a key proponent of the printmaking revival in Sydney in the 1970s and an active member of Sydney printmakers.

== Biography ==
Abbott was born at her parents' house in Summer Hill on 26 July 1928. She was the daughter of Dr Joseph Henry Abbott, a Sydney medical practitioner. She had two brothers, Philip and Rodney, and a sister, Audrey.

In the 1930s she was educated at Meriden Church of England School for Girls in Redmyre Road, Strathfield, completing the Leaving Certificate in 1944. From 1945 until 1949 she attended the East Sydney Technical College which is now known as the National Art School. At East Sydney, she was influenced by the colour curriculum of pioneering Sydney-based colour designer and educator Phyllis Shillito (1895–1980). Abbott graduated in textile design with honours in 1950.

In 1951, she married George Madgwick Davidson, a Sydney medical practitioner. He went on to be the director of anaesthetics and resuscitation at the Prince of Wales Hospital. The Davidsons had three children.

Davidson's work is included in public and private collections worldwide, including in America, Brazil, Britain, the Czech Republic, New Zealand, and Sweden. She has worked in the National Gallery of Australia, the State Library of Queensland, and the Powerhouse Museum. A 2017 oral history interview is held by the State Library of New South Wales.

She has undertaken three commissions for the Print Council of Australia and has won many awards. In 2001, the author Tanya Crothers wrote a book about Davidson explaining the complexities of her work and how she draws on her home and her city in her art. Davidson died in Sydney in 2022.
