= Kath Carr =

Australian gardener

- Born: Kathleen Baldick; 14 September 1909; Haberfield, New South Wales
- Died: 20 September 1999 (aged 90); Bayview, New South Wales
- Occupation: Garden designer
- Known for: Rural garden design
- Partner: Robert (Bob) Carr

Kathleen Carr (14 September 1909 – 20 September 1999) was a garden designer working in the eastern states of Australia for over 40 years.

== Biography ==
Kathleen Baldick was born at her parents' house Cornahir in Ramsay Street Haberfield on 14 September 1909. She was the first child of Lavinia Hazel and James Frederick Baldick. The family home where she was born was built in 1907 in the second subdivision of Richard Stanton's Haberfield Estate. After the birth of their sons, Allen and Kenric, the Baldick family sold the Haberfield house and moved to Strathfield. Moolah was on The Boulevarde, Strathfield, and was a large single story Federation-era home constructed of brick with wooden fretwork on sandstone foundations. It was set on three blocks of land with a tennis court and had gardens tended by a full-time gardener. Carr attended Meriden Church of England School for Girls. Her brothers attended Strathfield Grammar School. Her childhood aesthetic was shaped by the artistic family in which she grew up. Her father was a grain broker but her mother was a gifted pianist and artist who was a china painter, a potter, a wood worker and an embroiderer. Carr excelled at school winning many prizes but left aged fifteen. Her early artistic talent and love of plants were displayed in the detailed botanical illustrations she drew in her school botany book. It was not uncommon for Australian women in the 1920s to leave school early ignoring obvious talent rather than striving for a vocation. At that time many privileged young women spent the years between school and marriage at home playing cards and tennis, attending tea parties and sailing on Sydney harbour.

Carr married Robert (Bob) Carr, a farmer from western New South Wales, in 1935 at St Philip's Church, Sydney. They spent their honeymoon in Melbourne, Victoria. Carr's appreciation of native flora was born of necessity. After marriage she settled with her husband on a property between Hillston and Ivanhoe, New South Wales, where the rainfall is 250 millimeters in a good year, the soil a sandy loam and summer temperatures reach 40 °C (104 °F) for days at a time. In 1947 the Carr's moved to their own property Hidden Brook a 480 hectare property out of Binalong, New South Wales. By the time Carr was designing her own garden she was well versed in the writings of her gardening mentor Edna Walling.

Carr had enormous influence on rural garden making on the south-west slopes and plains of New South Wales in area like Binalong, Galong, Harden, and Young. It is an area of rich black soils, good rainfall and rolling open pastures. The properties in this district are reminiscent of the quintessential country landscapes depicted by painters like Arthur Streeton and Tom Roberts. The homestead garden that Carr created for Rhonda and Bill Daly at Milgadara is only a small part of that 1182 hectare property 20 km (12 mi) east of the town of Young but is integral to the way three generations of that family manage their thriving mixed-farming enterprise.

In 1964 Carr and her husband retired to Sydney. After a series of strokes Carr died childless in a nursing home in Bayview, New South Wales, aged 90.
