= Eve Dutton =

Councillor Eve Dutton OAM

Mayor Municipality of Strathfield
- In office 1991–1992
- Preceded by: Robert Kell
- Succeeded by: Leo O'Donnell
- In office 1995–1996
- Preceded by: John Elvy
- Succeeded by: Peter Smith

Personal details
- Born: 1928 New South Wales Australia
- Died: 14 October 2014 (aged 86) Brisbane
- Education: Meriden School
- Occupation: TAFE college lecturer

Margaret Eve Dutton (1928 – 14 October 2014) was an Australian Technical and further education college lecturer and former councillor of a local government area of Sydney, New South Wales. She was the first female mayor of the Municipality of Strathfield and Head, Design Branch, of Randwick College, Sydney Institute of TAFE.

== Early life ==
Dutton attended Meriden School as a boarding student from the age of seven.

== Teaching career ==
For 25 years, Dutton taught at the TAFE School of Art and Design. She became head of the design department at Randwick TAFE in 1978 and remained in that position until her retirement in 1986.

== Municipal Council career ==
Dutton was an alderman on Strathfield Council from 1987 to 2000. She was Mayor of Strathfield in 1991–1992 and 1995–1996 and the first female to hold that position in the 112-year history of that council.

== Death ==
Dutton died on 14 October 2014 in a Brisbane nursing home.

== Publications ==
- A students' guide to model making: Model buildings and construction (Rushcutters Bay; Oxford : Pergamon, 1970.)

== Honours ==
- The Medal of the Order of Australia was awarded to her on 11 June 2007 for service to local government, and to the community through a range of aged care, charitable, educational and service groups.
- The Dutton Centre was opened by the Municipality of Strathfield on 3 December 2012 and named in her honour.
