= Wadham Preparatory School =

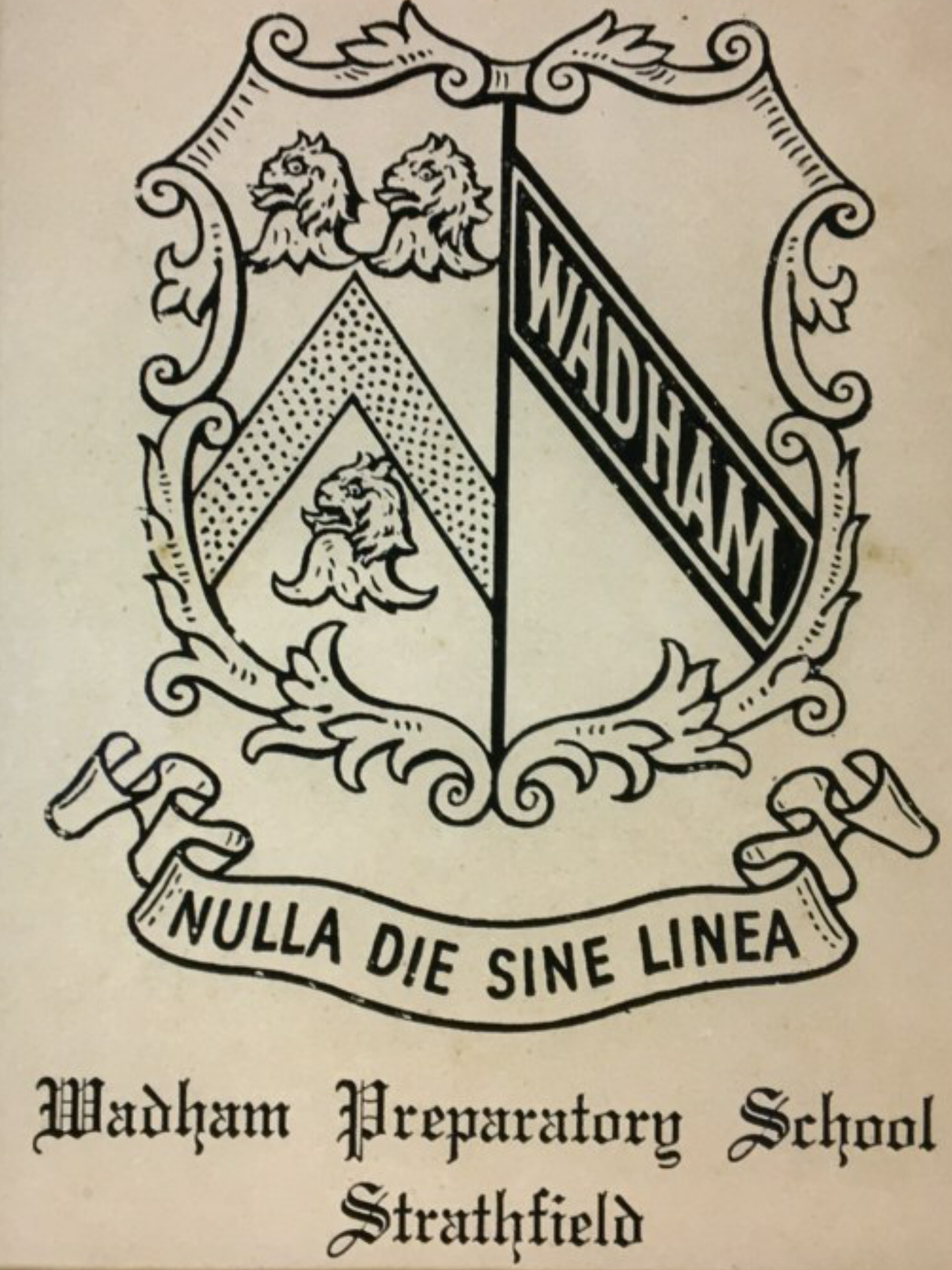
- Strathfield, New South Wales; Australia

Information
- Type: Independent, primary, day school
- Motto: Nulla Dies Sine Linea
- Denomination: Non-denominational
- Established: 1943
- Founder: K. A. Wyndham
- Status: Wadham was bought by Meriden School. The school is now closed and the building has been demolished.
- Closed: 1957

Wadham Preparatory School was an independent day, co-educational, preparatory school founded on Christian principles. The school was located at 9–11 Wallis Avenue Strathfield, New South Wales, Australia.

== History ==
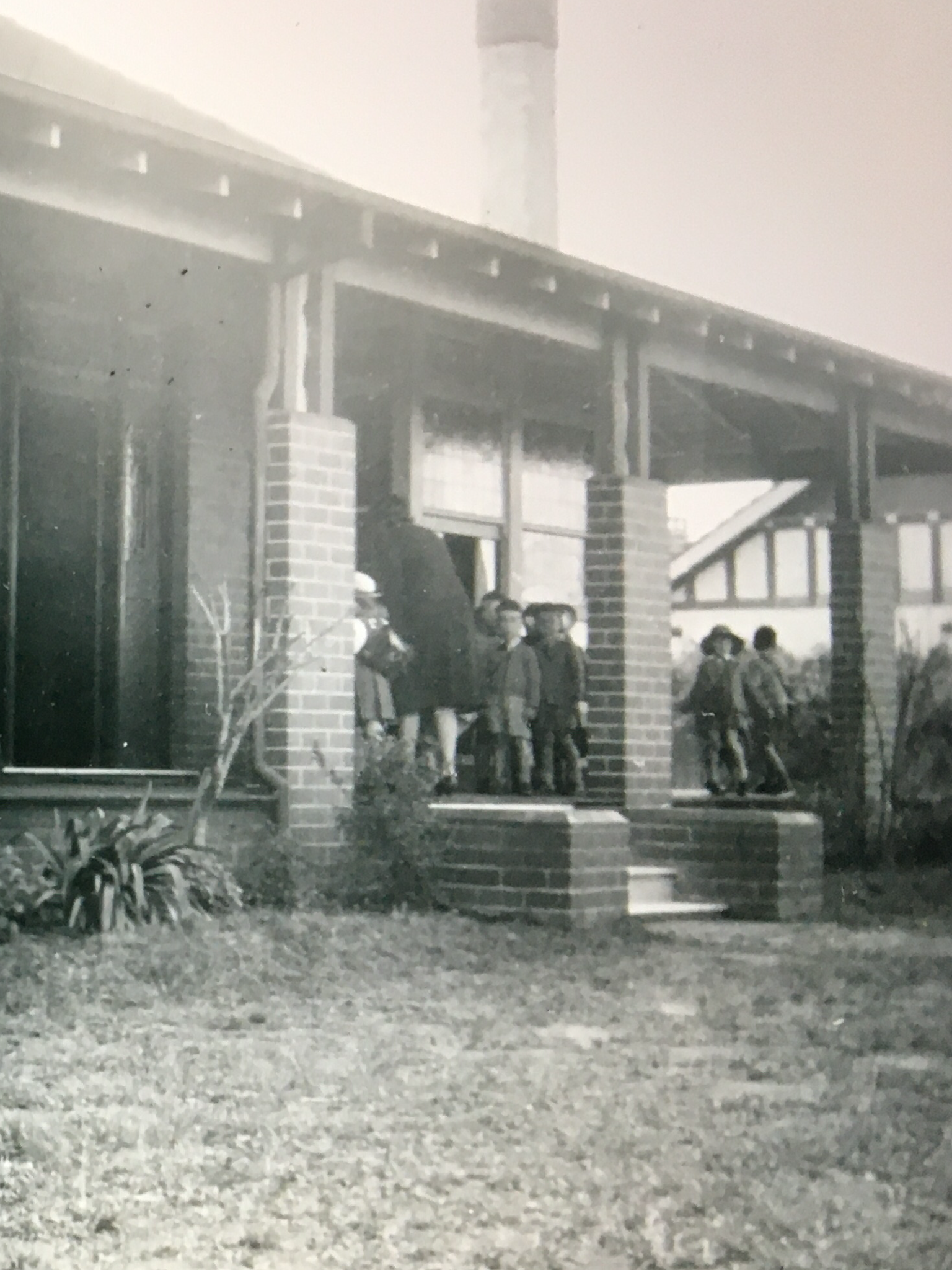
Wadham Preparatory School in Wallis Avenue Strathfield

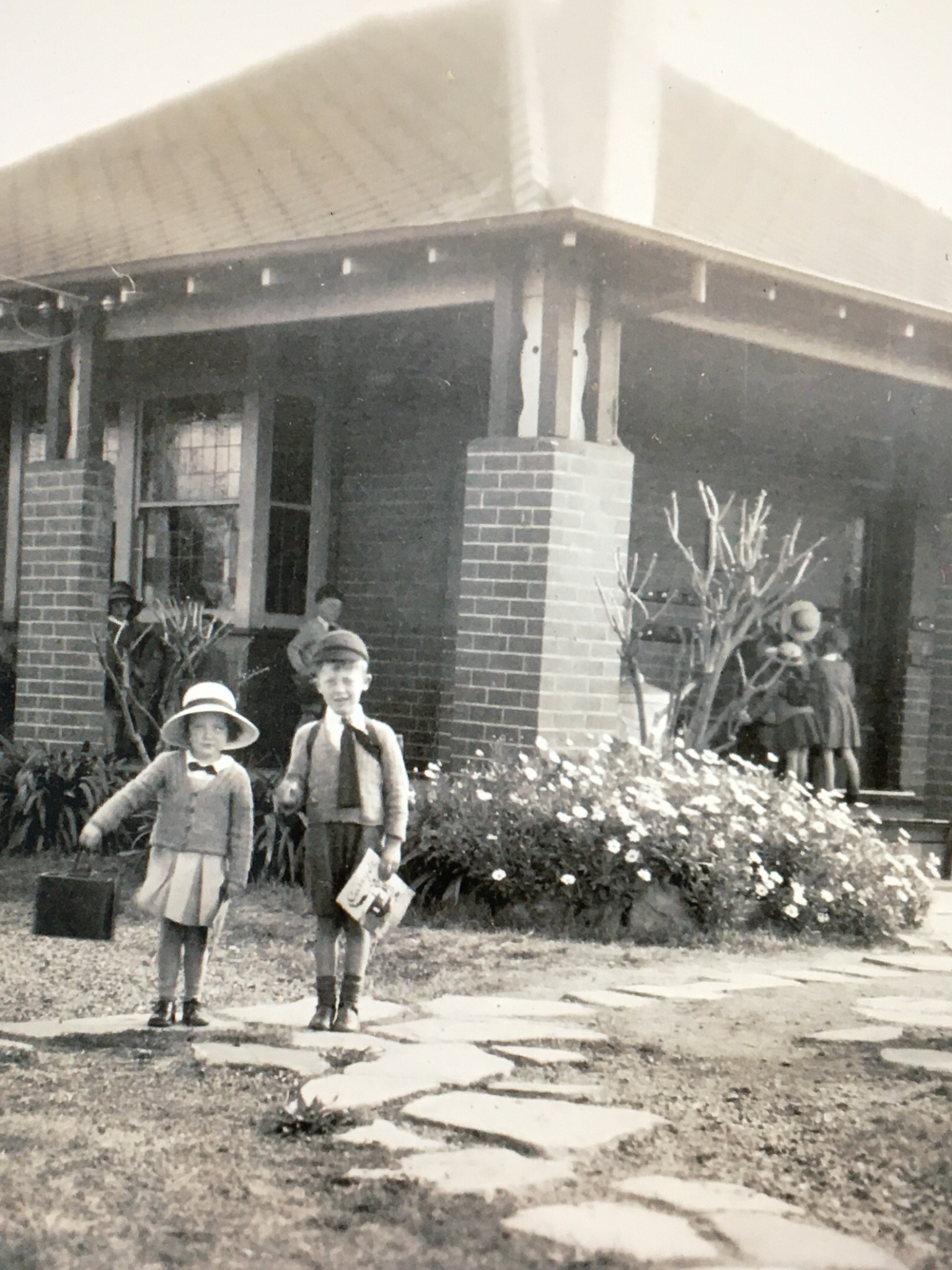
Prep school students in uniform in front of Wadham

The school was established in 1943 by K. A. Wyndham. In February 1942, Wyndham and her stepmother purchased a house known as Telerah from the Protestant Alliance Friendly Society for £1750. The house had previously been owned by George Christie. Christie was an accountant who had served as an Alderman on Municipality of Strathfield from 1892 until 1898. Upon her purchase of the property Wyndham changed the name to Wadham and opened a school. The school catered to children from pre-Kindergarten (known as nursery) to Year Six. Having been an early 20th Century domestic building the house was then adapted to school use. It had been built in the Federation style and was single storied face brick with a distinctive diamond pattern asbestos tile roof, a wrap-around verandah on three sides and a central hall. Miss Wyndham was strong on teaching cultural activities outside the curriculum. The school staff included Miss Joyce Foreman and Miss Heather Gell. Under the direction of Gell and with Charles Mackerras conducting the children performed in pantomimes at the Theatre Royal each Christmas including the Pied Piper of Hamelin in which Leonard Teale played the Pied Piper. In 1957, Wadham was purchased by Meriden, a neighbouring Anglican school, and was used as a sub-primary campus principally for girls, but also for nursery and kindergarten boys. In 1967 Meriden closed the Wadham campus having purchased land for its entire junior school in Redmyre Road, Strathfield. After its closure, the building was demolished and two large 1970s style face-brick houses now stand in its place at 9 and 11 Wallis Avenue Strathfield.

== Motto ==
The Latin motto of the school was “Nulla Dies Sine Linea” which translated into English meant “Never a day without a line”. It was first attributed to the Roman poet Horace but was later attributed to Roman author Pliny the Elder. The expression Nulla Dies Sine Linea is a reminder to young students to engage their creative minds every day.

== Kathleen Wyndham ==
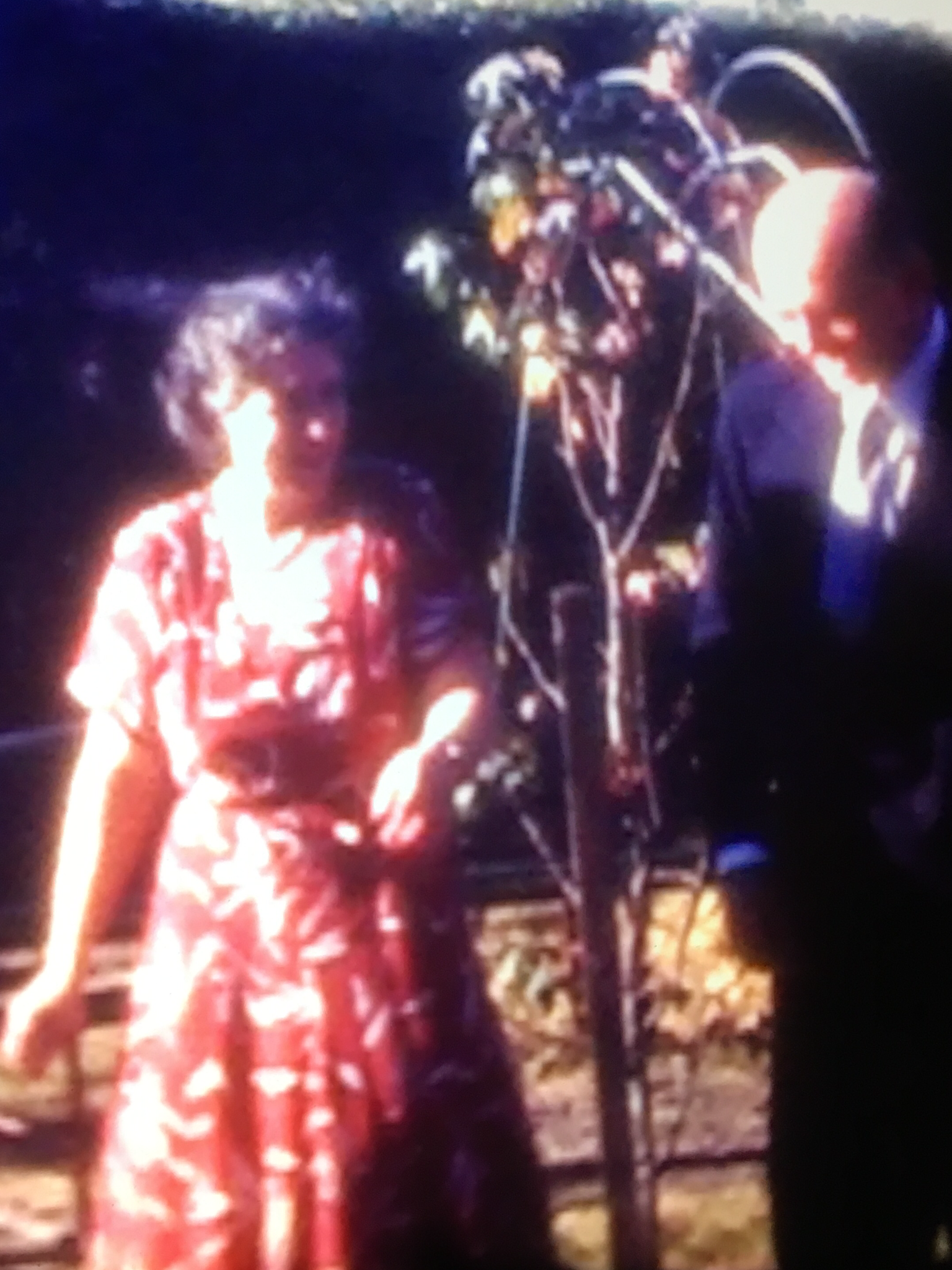
Kathleen Wyndham and Bill McMahon MHR in the garden of Wadham on Empire Day in the 1950s.

Kathleen Aimee Wyndham was born in Forbes, New South Wales, in 1905 and was the middle of three children of Agnes Euphemia (née Finigan) and Stanley Charles Wyndham. She was a great-granddaughter of Wadham Wyndham and her grandfather, Alexander Wyndham (died 1915), had arrived in Australia in the 1850s. Her father was a grocer and furniture dealer in Forbes and after his wife died in 1908, he moved to Glebe with his children who were looked after by their aunt, Rachel Kate Finigan. Rae Finigan, who had been a nurse, married Stanley Wyndham in 1911 and in 1912 the Wyndham family moved to 154 Albert, Strathfield. Kathleen Wyndham commenced studying at Methodist Ladies College in Burwood, in 1921 at the age of 15. She completed the Leaving Certificate in 1923. In her youth she was a competitive grade tennis player. After studying under Baddie Dumolo at the Sydney Kindergarten Training College in Henrietta Street, Waverley, Wyndham graduated in 1925. She became the director of the kindergarten and primary department at the Methodist Ladies College. In 1935 she undertook a seven months' tour of England, Scotland and the Continent to study the latest methods practised in early childhood education. In the early 1940s Wyndham established Wadham Preparatory School in the new Wyndham family home at Wallis Avenue, Strathfield. In 1954, Rachel Kate Wyndham died at home at Wadham. On 7 January 1956, aged 52, Wyndham married Harold Wenham Robinson CBE in the chapel of Wesley College, University of Sydney. That year she sold Wadham to Meriden. Wyndham died aged 83 in 1988.

Wyndham's elder brother was Sir Harold Wyndham CBE who was Director-General of Education in New South Wales between 1952 and 1968. He chaired the committee whose report (referred to as "The Wyndham Report") led to the Education Act of 1961 which completely re-organised secondary education in the State. Her younger brother, Norman Wyndham OBE, became a surgeon, a FRCS and a major in the Australian Army in World War II. From her father's second marriage she also had a half-brother, Robert.

== Past students ==
- Catherine Harris

== Past staff ==
- Heather Gell

== See also ==
- Meriden School
