= List of mayors of Strathfield =

Mayor of Strathfield Council
- Incumbent; Cr. Sandy Reddy since 29 September 2026
- Style: His/Her Worship
- Appointer: Municipality of Strathfield
- Term length: Two Years (1885–date)
- Formation: 30 August 1885
- First holder: George Hardie
- Deputy: Esther Kim
- Website: www.strathfield.nsw.gov.au Strathfield Heritage

This is a list of mayors of the Council of the Municipality of Strathfield, a local government area in the Inner West region of Sydney, New South Wales, Australia. First incorporated on 2 June 1885 as the "Municipal District of Strathfield" the first council was convened and elected on 19 August 1885, which later changed to the "Municipality of Strathfield" following the passing of the 1906 Local Government Act. The council became known as "Strathfield Council" on 1 July 1993 following the enactment of a new Local Government Act, which also stipulated a change of title from "Alderman" to "Councillor". Since 1971, the Mayor is elected bi-annually by the Councillors each September. The current mayor is Cr Sandy Reddy (Independent), elected on the 29 September 2026.

== Mayors ==
#	Years	Mayor	Notes
1	30 August 1885 – 4 February 1886	George Hardie	
2	4 February 1886 – 8 February 1889	Wilhelm von der Heyde	
3	8 February 1889 – February 1890	Albert Allen	
4	February 1890 – February 1891	John Hinchcliffe	
–	February 1891 – February 1892	Albert Allen	
–	February 1892 – February 1893	John Hinchcliffe	
–	February 1893 – February 1895	Albert Allen	
5	February 1895 – February 1898	Frederick Parsons	
6	February 1898 – February 1902	Thomas Mackenzie	
7	February 1902 – February 1904	Thomas J. Dickson	
–	February 1904 – February 1906	Frederick Parsons	
8	February 1906 – February 1908	John Price	
–	February 1908 – February 1911	Thomas Mackenzie	
9	February 1911 – February 1913	Charles C. Capper	
10	February 1913 – February 1916	Benjamin R. Gelling	
11	February 1916 – February 1917	John Robert Firth	
12	February 1917 – February 1919	Ernest Laurence	
13	February 1919 – December 1920	Arthur Kessell	
14	December 1920 – December 1922	William Pilgrim	
15	December 1922 – December 1924	Frederick Wallis	
16	December 1924 – December 1925	John Curnow	
17	December 1925 – December 1927	George Arthur Davey	
–	December 1927 – December 1932	John Robert Firth	
18	December 1932 – December 1938	Percy Douglas Shortland	
19	December 1938 – 1 June 1940	Alexander Melville	
20	June 1940 – December 1943	William Winter Cosgrove	
21	December 1943 – December 1949	Colin Hudson	
22	December 1949 – December 1951	Charles Morgan	
23	December 1951 – December 1954	Arthur Cave	
24	December 1954 – 1957	William Dunlop	
25	1957 – December 1959	Stanley Nelson Hedges	
26	December 1959 – December 1962	Bruce W. Ward	
27	December 1962 – December 1964	Beresford Calverley	
28	December 1964 – December 1966	Harvey Ford	
29	December 1966 – December 1967	Frederick Cartwright	
30	December 1967 – December 1968	James E. Smith	
31	December 1968 – December 1970	William H. Boyce	
32	December 1970 – September 1972	Frank Zions	
–	September 1972 – September 1976	William H. Boyce	
33	September 1976 – September 1983	Clarrie G. Edwards	
34	September 1983 – September 1984	Robert B. Kell	
35	September 1984 – September 1985	Rodney J. Rimes	
–	September 1985 – September 1988	Robert B. Kell	
36	September 1988 – September 1990	John C. Elvy	
–	September 1990 – September 1991	Robert B. Kell	
37	September 1991 – September 1992	Eve Dutton	
38	September 1992 – September 1994	Leo T. O’Donnell	
–	September 1994 – September 1995	John C. Elvy	
–	September 1995 – September 1996	Eve Dutton	
39	September 1996 – September 1997	Peter Smith	
40	September 1997 – September 1998	Elizabeth Gewandt	
41	September 1998 – September 2000	Laurel O’Toole	
42	September 2000 – September 2003	Virginia Judge (Labor)	
43	September 2003 – September 2004	John Abi-Saab	
44	September 2004 – September 2005	Alfred Tsang	
45	September 2005 – September 2007	Bill Carney	
46	September 2007 – 26 February 2008	Scott Farlow (Liberal)	
47	26 February 2008 – September 2008	Paul Barron (Labor)	
48	September 2008 – September 2009	Keith Kwon (Labor)	
49	September 2009 – September 2011	Tony Maroun (Liberal)	
–	September 2011 – September 2012	Paul Barron (Independent)	
50	17 September 2012 – 3 September 2013	Guilian Vaccari (Liberal)	
51	3 September 2013 – 30 September 2014	Daniel Bott (Labor)	
–	30 September 2014 – 29 September 2015	Guilian Vaccari (Liberal)	
52	29 September 2015 – 27 September 2016	Sang Ok (Liberal)	
53	27 September 2016 – September 2017	Andrew Soulos (Independent)	
–	26 September 2017 – 3 September 2019	Guilian Vaccari (Liberal)	
54	3 September 2019 – 14 September 2021	Antoine Doueihi (Liberal)	
55	14 September 2021 – 3 December 2021	Stephanie Kokkolis (Liberal)	
56	12 January 2022 - 2 March 2023	Matthew Blackmore (Strathfield Independents)	
57	2 March 2023 – August 2024	Karen Pensabene (Labor)	
58	October 8 2024 - 30 September 2025	John-Paul Baladi (Liberal)	
59	30 September 2025 - 29 September 2026	Ben Cai (Independent)	
60	29 September 2026 -	Sandy Reddy (Independent)	
