= Edna Walling =

Australian gardener

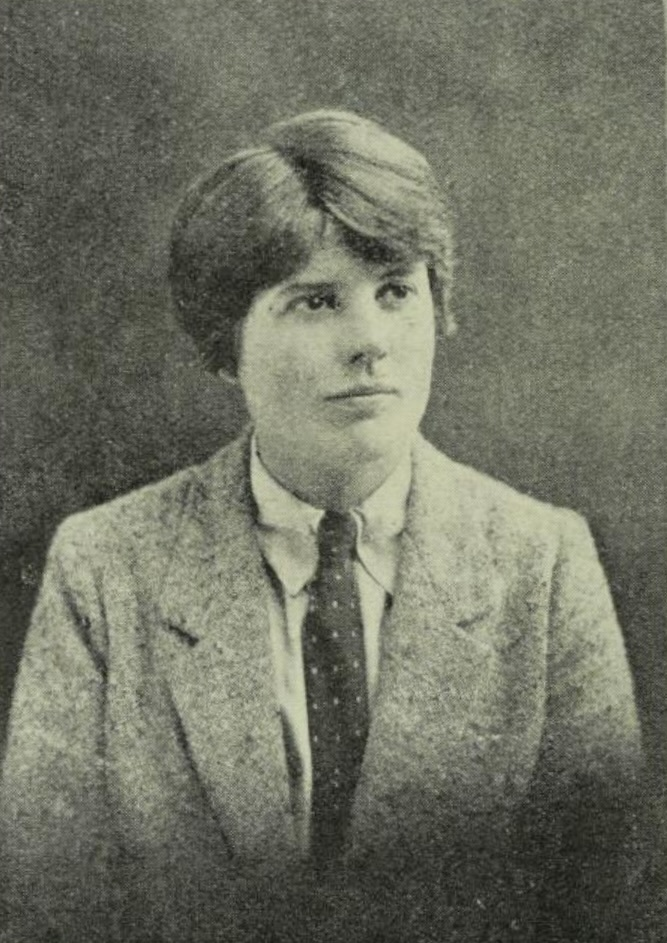
- Walling in 1925
- Born: 4 December 1895; York
- Died: 8 August 1973 (aged 77); Nambour, Queensland
- Other name: Margaret
- Occupation: Garden designer
- Known for: Garden design, conservation, writer, photographer
- Partner: Lorna Fielden

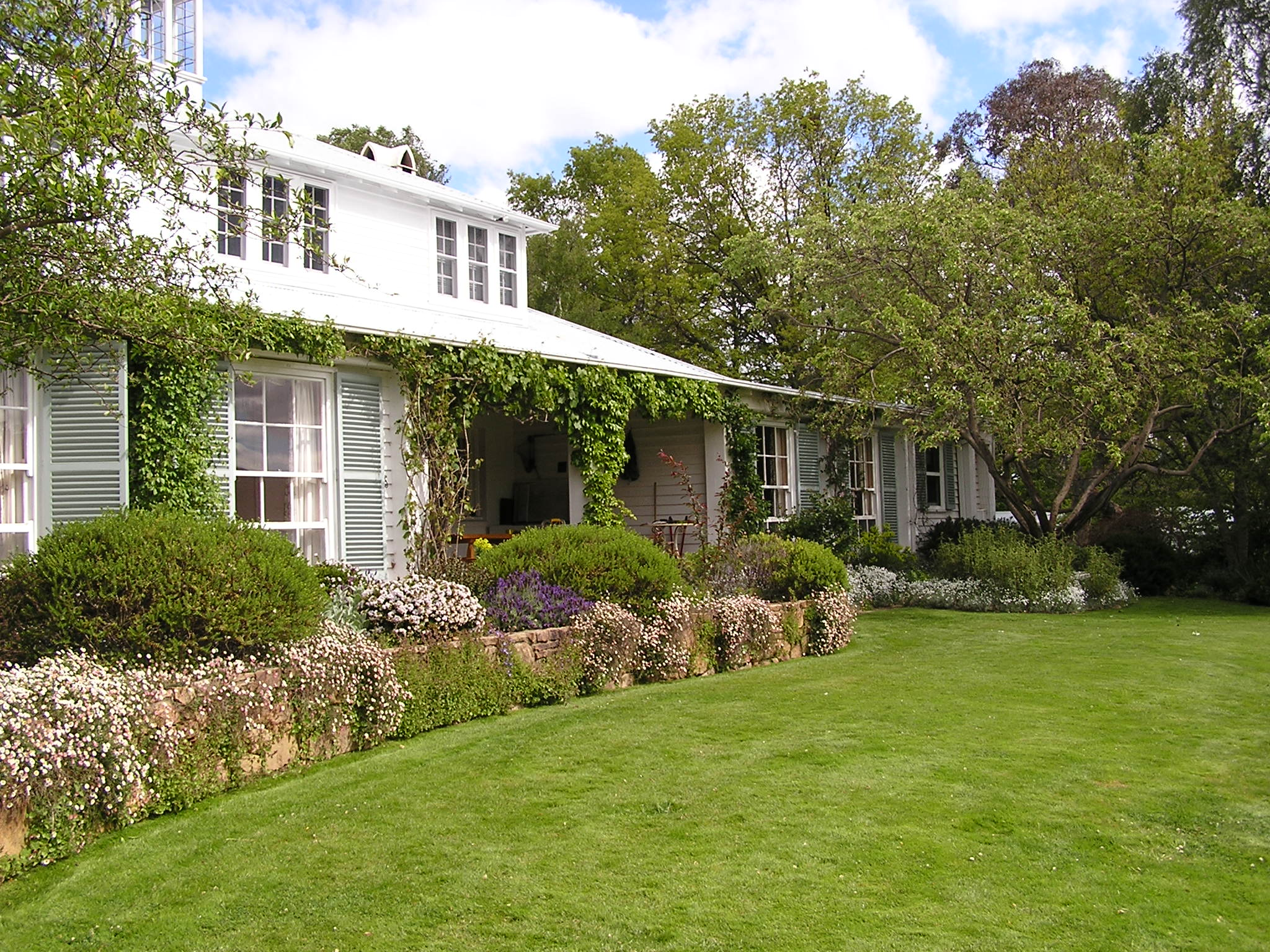
Markdale, near Crookwell, New South Wales – garden designed by Walling in 1947

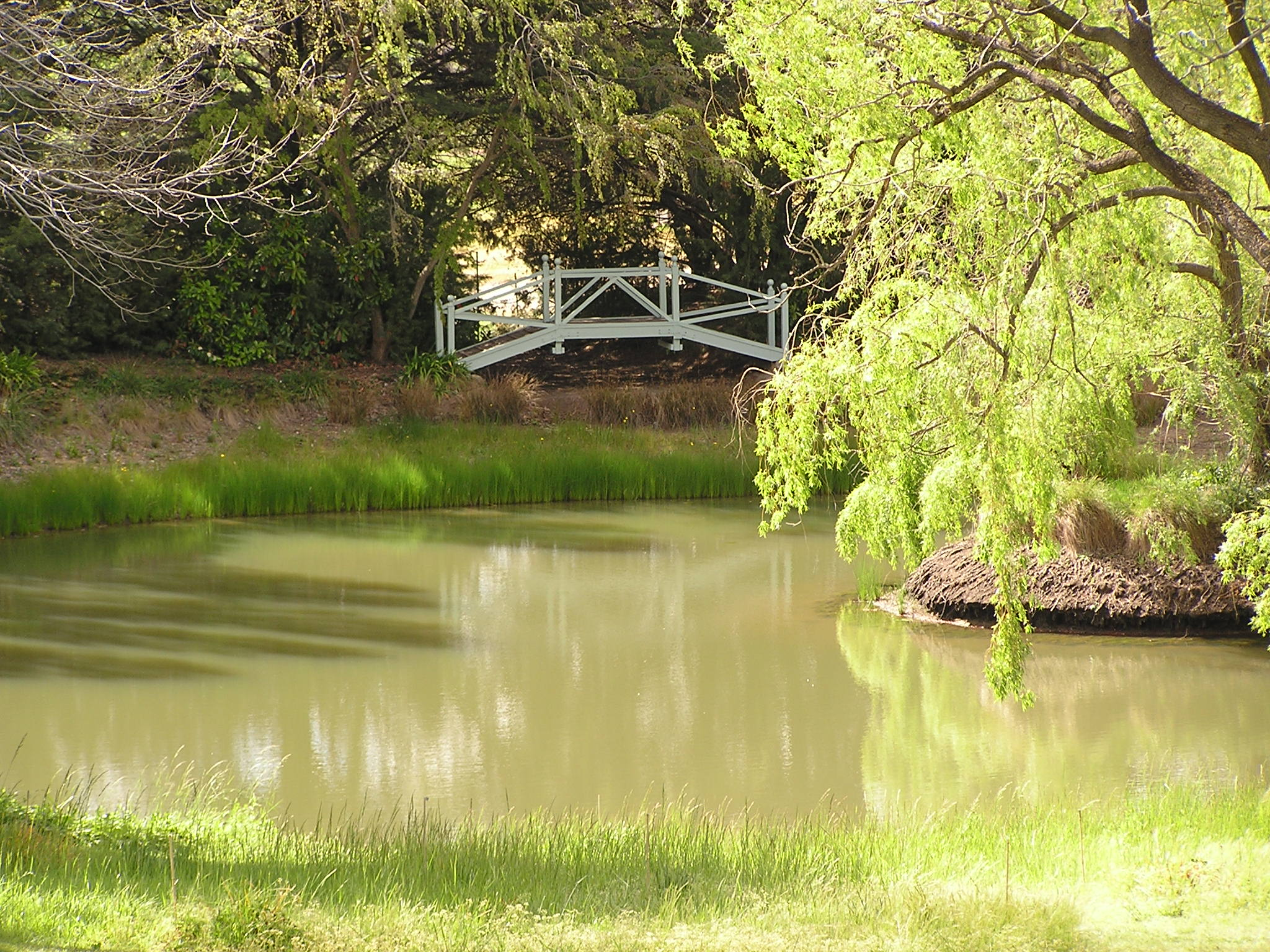
The lake at Markdale

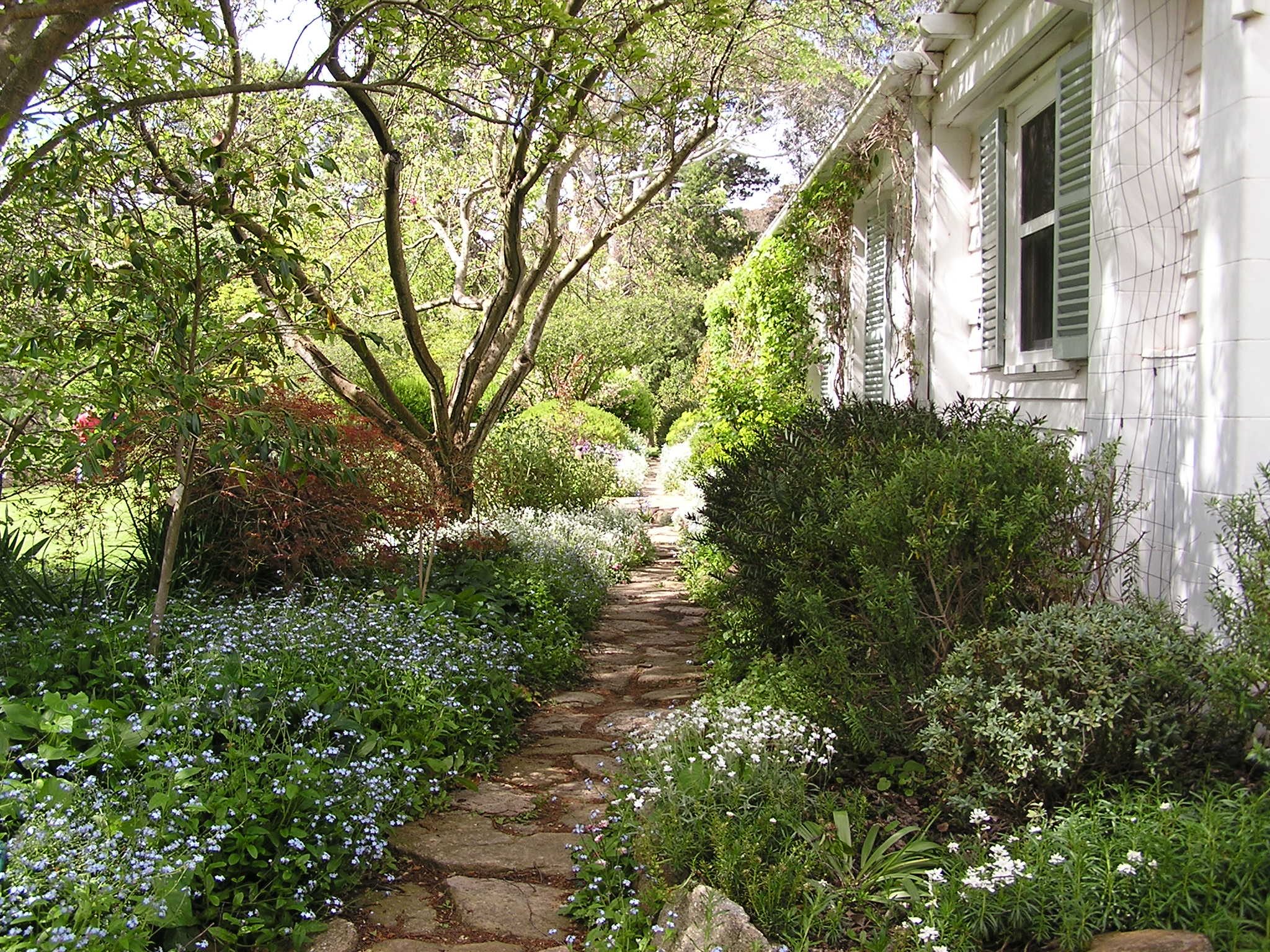
Garden path at Markdale

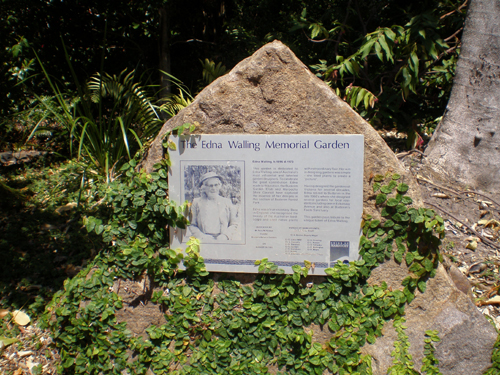
Edna Walling Memorial Garden in Buderim, Queensland. Walling retired to Buderim in the 1960s, designing a number of local gardens there.

Edna Margaret Walling (4 December 1895 – 8 August 1973) was one of Australia's most influential landscape designers.

== Early years and migration ==
Walling was born in Yorkshire and grew up in the village of Bickleigh in Devon, England, second daughter of William Walling, a furniture dealer's clerk, and Harriet Margaret, née Goff. Her father encouraged her exploration and love of the English countryside and taught her woodworking. Edna was schooled at the Convent of Notre Dame, Plymouth, Devon. When she was fourteen years old the family emigrated to New Zealand and in 1914 moved with her family to Melbourne, Victoria, Australia where her father had gone in advance in 1911.

== Training ==
With the encouragement of her mother, Walling was awarded her government certificate in horticulture at Burnley College in December 1917, and after some years as a jobbing gardener she commenced her own landscape design practice in the 1920s. Garden construction rather than horticulture interested her most, and she sought work from Melbourne's architects, and secured commissions including several from the fashionable architect Marcus Martin. She "went on to design some significant Arts and Crafts gardens".

== Bickleigh Vale ==
In the 1920s, as Australia's first woman land developer, Walling began to create a village at Mooroolbark on the outskirts of Melbourne called Bickleigh Vale. It is one of her most acclaimed achievements. It was designed to be 'the nucleus of an English village' and she built the first cottage, named after the village of Sonning on the River Thames in England, as her own home, though it had to be completely rebuilt after a disastrous fire. She sold subdivisions of the land only to people who were prepared to accept designs for a cottage and garden prepared by her.

== Garden design ==
In 1935 Ellis Stones built a wall for her. Recognising his ability—which she called 'a rare thing this gift for placing stones' – she suggested that he work for her. She gave him a free hand to create walls, outcrops, pools and paths in her gardens at some of Melbourne's finest homes which assisted in establishing a local garden tradition. Their best collaboration was seen in a free-form swimming pool and outcrop, built in 1939–40 for Edith Hughes-Jones at Olinda, Victoria.

Her design practice grew and she worked across Australia, in Perth, Hobart, Sydney, and Buderim in Queensland. Her commissions in Victoria included designing the lily pond for Coombe Cottage, the Yarra Ranges residence of Dame Nellie Melba; Durrol for Mrs Stanley Allen at Mount Macedon – the garden remains though the house was destroyed by fire on 11 July 2018; Rock Lodge garden for Mrs P.F. O'Collins in Frankston; Cruden Farm garden for Mrs Keith Murdoch (later Dame Elisabeth), Langwarrin; and the Marshall garden in Eaglemont. One of her most intact commissions in New South Wales is Markdale, Binda.

Walling's expertise as an artist enabled her to produce watercolour plans to convey to clients the ambience of the finished gardens she intended to create. Her plans from the 1920s and 1930s show a strong architectural framework with 'low stone walls, wide pergolas and paths – always softened with a mantle of greenery'. She later drew inspiration from the Australian bush, creating a more naturalistic style with boulders, rocky outcrops and indigenous plants. In small suburban gardens, Walling created garden 'rooms' to make the garden appear far larger than it actually was.

Her designs were heavily influenced by her experience of the Devon countryside as a child and designers such as Gertrude Jekyll. The houses of American architect Royal Barry Wills (renowned for his Cape Cod designs) and Lewis Mumford's books, The Culture of Cities and The Image of the City, also provided early inspiration.

== Conservationist ==
In the mid-1940s Walling concentrated her interest in native plants which she had begun using in domestic gardens in the 1920s. In the 1950s, she became interested in the conservation of roadside vegetation and was a prolific writer in the press on the subject as well as her 1952 book The Australian Roadside. According to Trisha Dixon, Walling was an important influence on Australian gardening, steering tastes away from an Anglo-centric heritage towards a respect for the Australian climate and landscape.

In 1967, she moved from Melbourne to Bendles at Buderim in Queensland, where she had hoped to further develop the village concept but it did not progress. Despite her ill-health during her last years at Bendles, Walling continued to write prolifically, rewriting manuscripts, corresponding to newspapers on environmental issues, and trying to republish her books. About a quarter of Walling's designs survive and these are held in the State Library of Victoria and in private collections in Tasmania, South Australia, New South Wales and Victoria.

== Writer-photographer ==
In 1926, Walling began contributing regularly to The Australian Home Beautiful, and by the mid-1930s had become an expert photographer in order to illustrate her articles. By the 1950s, Walling had stopped producing her regular column for The Australian Home Beautiful, but continued to write occasional articles for Walkabout, Woman's World, Australian House and Garden, The Sun News-Pictorial and The Age. She continued to send articles to editors until shortly before her death. The Happiest Days of My Life, covering the development of her holiday property at Lorne, was written by Walling but not published until 2008. She was the author of several books on landscape design, and she and garden writer and botanist Jean Galbraith enjoyed a long correspondence, generating materials for an unpublished manuscript 'The Harvest of a Quiet Eye'.

== Select publications ==
- Walling, Edna; Dixon, Trisha, 1953- (1943), Gardens in Australia : their design and care (2nd. facsim. ed.), Bloomings Books, ISBN 978-1-876473-15-0
- Walling, Edna (1947), Cottage and garden in Australia, Oxford University Press
- Walling, Edna (1948), A gardener's log, Oxford University Press
- Walling, Edna (1952), The Australian roadside, Oxford University Press
- Fielden, Lorna; Walling, Edna, 1895-1973 (1947), The gardener's warning, L. Fielden
- Walling, Edna (2008), The happiest days of my life (1st. ed.), Barbara Barnes, ISBN 978-0-646-49075-5

== Personal life ==
Walling never married and called herself a 'misfit' or 'odd' and, as she dressed in a masculine manner and cropped her hair short, male clients were unsure how to react to her. Though she had long working association with Eric Hammond and Ellis Stones, her succession of female assistants and close relationships with women including Esmé Johnston and poet Lorna Fielden and friendships with other women who lived openly in a partnership, like bookshop owner Margareta Webber with Dr Jean Littlejohn, and landscape architect Mervyn Davis (her name was Welsh) and Daphne Pearson, have led some researchers to the conclusion that she was lesbian, though Walling herself, who lived through Australia's more conservative, homophobic cultural period, made no such admission. She mentored the rural garden designer Kath Carr for many years. A design commission prompted her move to Bendles in Buderim in Queensland 1967, where she was later joined by her partner Lorna Fielden, who had been a teacher at MLC and also edited Walling's writings. Walling died at Nambour on 8 August 1973, and Lorna four years later; she and Edna are buried there side by side under two trees.

== See also ==
- List of gardens by Edna Walling
- Gardens in Australia
