= Commonwealth Reconstruction Training Scheme =

Commonwealth Reconstruction Training Scheme (CRTS) was an Australian government scheme started during World War II to offer vocational or academic training to both men and women who had served in the Australian Defence Force. Its purpose was to aid in the return of ex-service personnel to civilian employment. It operated from 1942 until last acceptances were taken in 1950. It was managed by the Department of Post-War Reconstruction.

== Background ==
The purpose of the Commonwealth Reconstruction Training Scheme was to provided training to ex-service personnel and certain non-service personnel to resume civilian employment. The scheme had a closing date for applications of 30 June 1950.

On 30 July 1943, the Minister of Post-War Reconstruction, Ben Chifley, announced that the scheme, long underway, for a post-service training scheme for ex-service personnel consisting of both vocational and professional training. The emphasis would be on vocational training such as building trades to supplement the governments housing plans and Chifley said that some servicemen were already being trained as part of the army education scheme.

In October 1943, Dr H. C. Coombs, Director of Post-War Reconstruction met with the ACTU to discuss the establishment of regional training bodies as part of the CRTS. The ACTU would instruct its branches to consult with the regional committees that would be set up by the CRTS. In November 1943, Chifley announced that the Commonwealth would financially assist the state governments to extend their educational facilities and accommodation.

In November 1943, the Minister of Post War Reconstruction announced that university correspondence courses, of 40 to 50 subjects, would be offered to service personnel in preparation to them starting the CRTS. The Universities of Western Australia, South Australia, Victoria, and Queensland agreed to offer various subjects, beginning from 1944 and managed through the ADF's education service branches. In early 1944, the scheme was forecasted to cost over £20,000,000.

The Commonwealth Reconstruction Training Scheme's planning, organisation and direction was conducted by the Central Reconstruction Training Committee. This committee was made up of representatives from Repatriation Commission, Universities Commission, Department of Labour and National Service, and lastly three members appointed by Minister representing employers, employees and ex-servicemen. Regional executive committees would administer the scheme in individual states. The scheme would be introduced via three phases, during the war, after demobilisation and lastly, after discharge. The Federal government would ensure that the training opportunities provided by the scheme would not be wasted with employment to be ensured by employers and employee organisations, especially in the trades.

The scheme provided funding for training in three key areas. Academic university training, technical colleges and schools for both academic and technical education and rural training. Vocational trainees received six months training and after reaching a 40% level of proficiency, and were then placed in employment and paid the full wage for their profession with the federal government subsidizing the wage to the employer based on the employees level of proficiency.

Full-time men training in the scheme were paid £4 10s per week rising to £6 10s if they were married with children. Tuition fees were paid an allowance for travel, books and equipment. Full-time training for women service personnel and war widows were provided for at £2 a week if not maintaining themselves already and £2 15s a week for those not living at home or who had dependents. Part-time trainees were paid a tuition fee up time £60. War widows were also included under the part-time training program.

In January 1950, the Commonwealth Department of Post-War Reconstruction was closed and the CRTS was moved to the Department of National Development. The financial cost of the scheme to the country was said to be £341 million by 1950. By 31 May 1951, 334,269 ex-servicemen and women were accepted for training.

== Requirements ==
Firstly ADF personnel must have served a minimum of six months, honorably discharged and the scheme was open to both men and women. Secondly, there were a number of requirements to be met in order to qualify for the scheme:

- they could not return to their pre-war occupation because of an incapacity suffered due to the war;
- they enlisted or were called up before they turned 21 and they were suitable for professional or vocational training;
- they required a refresher course, or wished to complete a course interrupted by service;
- they were self-employed and were unable to resume their business; or
- they displayed conspicuous ability during their war service and were suitable for professional or vocational training.

== Training numbers ==
From March 1944 until the 31 May 1951, 334,269 ex-service men and women took part in the scheme. By the latter date, 94,448 people had completed their training in all fields while another 39,762 were still in training:

=== University full-time ===
Accepted	Withdrew prior	Awaiting start	Commenced	Withdrawn after start	Completed	In Training
24,939	3,137	74	21,728	6,246	12,177	3,305

=== University part-time ===
Accepted	Withdrew prior	Awaiting start	Commenced	Withdrawn after start	Completed	In Training
19,086	2,349	141	16,596	6,743	4,983	4,870

=== Technical training full-time ===
Accepted	Withdrew prior	Awaiting start	Commenced	Withdrawn after start	Completed	In Training
91,253	26,768	199	64,286	22,724	33,757	7,805

=== Technical training part-time ===
Accepted	Withdrew prior	Awaiting start	Commenced	Withdrawn after start	Completed	In Training
195,985	31,420	0	164,565	98,905	41,948	23,712

=== Rural training full-time ===
Accepted	Withdrew prior	Awaiting start	Commenced	Withdrawn after start	Completed	In Training
3,006	815	13	2,178	525	1,583	70

== Known Executive Committee Members ==
- DR. H.C Coombs (chairman)
- Instructor-Captain Morton Moyes
- Commander John Walsh
- Dr P.W.E Curtin (co-chairman)
- Doris Carter
- Brigadier E.F Harrison
