= Belgrave Heights =

- Suburb
- Interactive map of Belgrave Heights
- Coordinates: 37.923°S 145.340°E
- Country: Australia
- State: Victoria
- City: Melbourne
- LGA: Shire of Yarra Ranges
- Location: 36 km (22 mi) from Melbourne; 2 km (1.2 mi) from Belgrave

Government
  - State electorate: Monbulk
  - Federal division: Casey

Area
  - Total: 1.7 km^{2} (0.66 sq mi)

Population
  - Total: 1,398 (2021 census)
  - Density: 822/km^{2} (2,130/sq mi)
- Postcode: 3160
Suburbs around Belgrave Heights
Tecoma	Belgrave	Selby
Lysterfield	Belgrave Heights	Selby
Lysterfield	Belgrave South	Belgrave South

Belgrave Heights is a suburb in Melbourne, Victoria, Australia, 36 km south-east from Melbourne's central business district, located within the Shire of Yarra Ranges local government area. Belgrave Heights recorded a population of 1,398 at the 2021 census.

Belgrave Heights Post Office opened on 1 August 1938 as settlement began in the area, and closed in 1977.

In February 1983, the Ash Wednesday fires swept through the area, destroying 238 houses and causing 21 deaths.

== Schools ==
- Belgrave Heights Christian School

== Birdsland Reserve ==
Belgrave Heights has a 75-hectare (190-acre) bushland park called Birdsland. Originally owned by a farming family, the Birds, it was known locally as "Birds' Paddock". It was later purchased in 1982 by the former Shire of Sherbrooke (now part of Yarra Ranges) expressly for public use. In 1983 the property was damaged by the Ash Wednesday bushfires. In 1984 it was opened to the public for bushwalking, picnicking, sightseeing, and local horse agistment. It is a very important habitat link for locally rare Platypus and the Yellow-belied Glider. The reserve waterways are managed by Melbourne Water and other areas managed by Shire of Yarra Ranges. Birdsland Advisory Committee help make decisions for a broad overview to management of the reserve. The committee has developed a sustainable design education centre, including solar panels, composting toilet and water tanks. Next door is the Southern Dandenongs Indigenous Plant Nursery which is a not-for profit group which provides a range of plants that are native to the Dandenong Ranges.

Many scenes in the 7 Network mini-series Against The Wind were filmed there in 1978.

Melbourne Water offers stream frontage grants to help landowners apply for money for weed eradication, fencing and more.
In February 2009 a bushfire swept through the Birdsland area. The bushfire grew to around 300 hectares coming just 2 weeks after the 2009 Victorian bushfires

== Monbulk Creek Corridor ==
Monbulk Creek is part of a biolink corridor (the biolink being between Dandenong Ranges National Park and Lysterfield Lake Park). This corridor is primarily located on the riparian zone (the area adjacent to the creek). This provides habitat to many different environments aquatic, creek banks and the floodplain.

These different elements can be separated into Abiotic (Non-living things) and Biotic (living things). The abiotic factors (such as climate, rocks, debris, water, etc.) and the biotic factors (flora and fauna) and the interactions between the two make up an ecosystem.

== Flora ==
Belgrave Heights is located on the borderline Southern Highlands Fall and Gippsland Plains Bioregion.

Belgrave Heights falls into a combination of different Ecological Vegetation Classes (EVC).

Shrubby Foothill Forest Eucalyptus Obliqua, radiata

Exocarpus cupressiformis Spyridium parvifolium Goodenia ovata Epacris impressa Tetratheca cilata Platylobium formosum Lomatia ilicifolia Acrotriche prostrata Viola hederacea Gonocarpus tetragynus Tetrarrhena juncea Leptosperma laterale Pteridium esculatum Billarderi scandens

The dominant overstorey is Acacia melanoxylon, Acacia dealbata, Acacia pycnantha, Eucalyptus cephalocarpa, Eucalyptus cypellocarpa (in areas near Belgrave Lake Park), Eucalyptus goniocalyx growing in and around Birdsland and Zig Zag Road, Eucalyptus obliqua growing through most of the area as well as in Belgrave South, Eucalyptus ovata which tends to grow in low-lying areas and Eucalyptus radiata which is quite common in the Belgrave South Primary school grounds with the very fine bark and peppermint smelling leaves.

Shrub layer

The shrub layer in gullies and shaded areas, consists of Coprosma quadrifida, Acacia verticillata, Pomaderris aspera, Bedfordia arborescens, Cassinia aculeata, Ozothamnus ferrugineus, Olearia lirata, Olearia argophylla, Prostanthera lasianthos, Gynatrix pulchella and Pimelea axiflora.

In open woodland there is Acacia leprosa, Acacia myrtifolia, Acacia mucronata, Acacia stricta, Allocasuarina paludosa, Goodia lotifolia and the more rarer fire dependent plants Hakea ulicina, Hakea nodosa and Banksia marginata and Banksia spinulosa. Pandorea pandorana and Clematis aristata are the two main climbers.

Ground layer

The ground layer is made up of Poa labillardieri, Poa ensiformis, Poa sieberiana, Themeda triandra, Dianella revoluta in dryer areas and Dianella longifolia and Dianella tasmanica in wetter areas. Microlaena stipoides, Bidgee Widgee, Goodenia ovata, Lomandra longifolia and Lomandra filiformis are common throughout the Belgrave area. Other plants like Xanthorrhoea minor is more common south of Belgrave. Also with pea family members Platylobium formosum, Platylobium obtusangulum, Pultenaea hispidula, Pultenaea scabra and Pultenaea stricta.

== Fauna ==
Animals in the area include:

Mammals

- Platypus (Ornithorhynchus anatinus)
- Short-beaked echidna (Tachyglossus aculeatus)
- Yellow-bellied glider (Petaurus australis)
- Sugar glider (Petaurus breviceps)
- Wombat (Vombatus ursinus)
- Common ringtail possum or "Ringtail" (Pseudocheirus peregrinus)
- Common brushtail possum (Trichosurus vulpecula)
- Swamp wallaby (Wallabia bicolor)
- Kangaroos (Macropus giganteus)

Birds

- Galah (Cacatua roseicapilla)
- Tawny frogmouth (Podargus strigoides)
- Yellow-tailed black cockatoo (Calyptorhynchus funereus)
- Sulphur crested cockatoo (Cacatua galerita)
- Long-billed corella (Cacatua tenuirostris)
- Australian king parrot (Alisterus scapularis)
- Crimson rosella (Platycercus elegans)
- Eastern rosella (Platycercus eximius)
- Powerful owl (Ninox strenua)
- Kookaburra (Dacelo novaeguineae)
- Superb fairy-wren (Malurus cyaneus)
- Red wattlebird (Anthochaera carunculata)
- Noisy miner (Manorina melanocephala)
- Eastern yellow robin (Eopsaltria australis)
- Mudlark (Grallina cyanoleuca)
- Grey butcherbird (Cracticus torquatus)
- Magpie (Gymnorhina tibicen)
- Wedge-tailed eagle (Aquila audax)
- Australian Raven (Corvus coronoides)

Reptiles

- Blue tongue lizard
- Red bellied snake
- Tiger snake
- Common eastern brown snake

Feral animals include

- Feral cats
- Foxes
- Indian mynahs
- Blackbirds
- Feral pigeons
- Garden snails

== The Convention ==
The Upwey Convention (commenced in 1918) moved to Belgrave Heights in 1950, establishing itself on the former Lockwood Golf Links in Lockwood Road. It continued to be called the Upwey Convention for a number of years before being renamed to the Belgrave Heights Convention, which it is known as to this day. The Convention Grounds, as the property became known, has been a notable landmark in Belgrave Heights with its many old buildings, including the main auditorium which has undergone major redevelopment in recent years.
