= H. commutata =

H. commutata may refer to:

- Hakea commutata, an Australian plant
- Hibbertia commutata, a plant endemic to Australia
- Hypolepis commutata, a polypod fern
