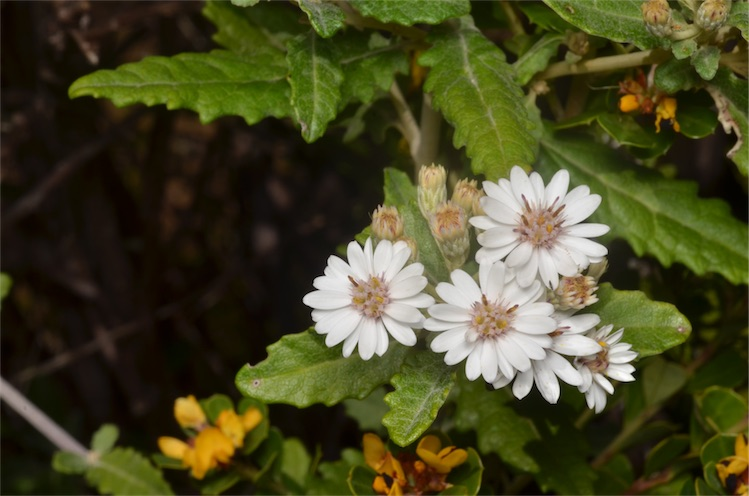
- In the Tasmanian Bushland Garden

Scientific classification
- Kingdom: Plantae
- Clade: Tracheophytes
- Clade: Angiosperms
- Clade: Eudicots
- Clade: Asterids
- Order: Asterales
- Family: Asteraceae
- Genus: Olearia
- Species: O. stellulata

Binomial name
- Olearia stellulata (Labill.) DC.

Synonyms
- Aster stellulatus Labill.; Diplostephium stellulatum (Labill.) Nees; Eurybia fulvida Cass. nom. illeg.; Eurybia gunniana var. scaberula Hook.f.; Olearia stellulata (Labill.) DC. f. stellulata; Olearia stellulata (Labill.) DC. var. stellulata

= Olearia stellulata =

Species of plant

Olearia stellulata is a species of flowering plant in the family Asteraceae and is endemic to south-eastern Australia. It is a shrub with lance-shaped or narrowly elliptic leaves, and white and yellow or mauve, daisy-like inflorescences.

== Description ==
Olearia stellulata is a shrub that typically grows to a height of up to 2 m (6 ft 7 in), its branchlets densely covered with yellowish, star-shaped hairs. Its leaves are lance-shaped or narrowly elliptic, 30–75 mm (1.2–3.0 in) long and 6–18 mm (0.24–0.71 in) wide with about 5 to 10 teeth on each side. The upper surface of mature leaves is glabrous, the lower surface densely covered with yellowish, star-shaped hairs. The heads or daisy-like "flowers" are arranged in corymbs or panicles on a peduncle 8–20 mm (0.31–0.79 in) and are 15–25 mm (0.59–0.98 in) in diameter with 8 to 15 white ray florets, surrounding 8 to 15 yellow or mauve disc florets, the ligule 6–10 mm (0.24–0.39 in) long. Flowering occurs from November to January and the fruit is a ribbed achene, the pappus with bristles 3–4 mm (0.12–0.16 in) long.

== Taxonomy ==
This daisy was first formally described in 1806 by Jacques Labillardière who gave it the name Aster stellulatus in his Novae Hollandiae Plantarum Specimen. In 1836, Augustin Pyramus de Candolle changed the name to Olearia stellulata in his Prodromus Systematis Naturalis Regni Vegetabilis. The specific epithet (stellulata) means "small stars".

== Distribution and habitat ==
Olearia stellulata is found in Victoria and Tasmania. In Victoria it is apparently confined to the Chapple Vale area in the Shire of Colac Otway and in Tasmania it is widespread and common in forests, sometimes intergrading with O. lirata and O. phlogopappa.
