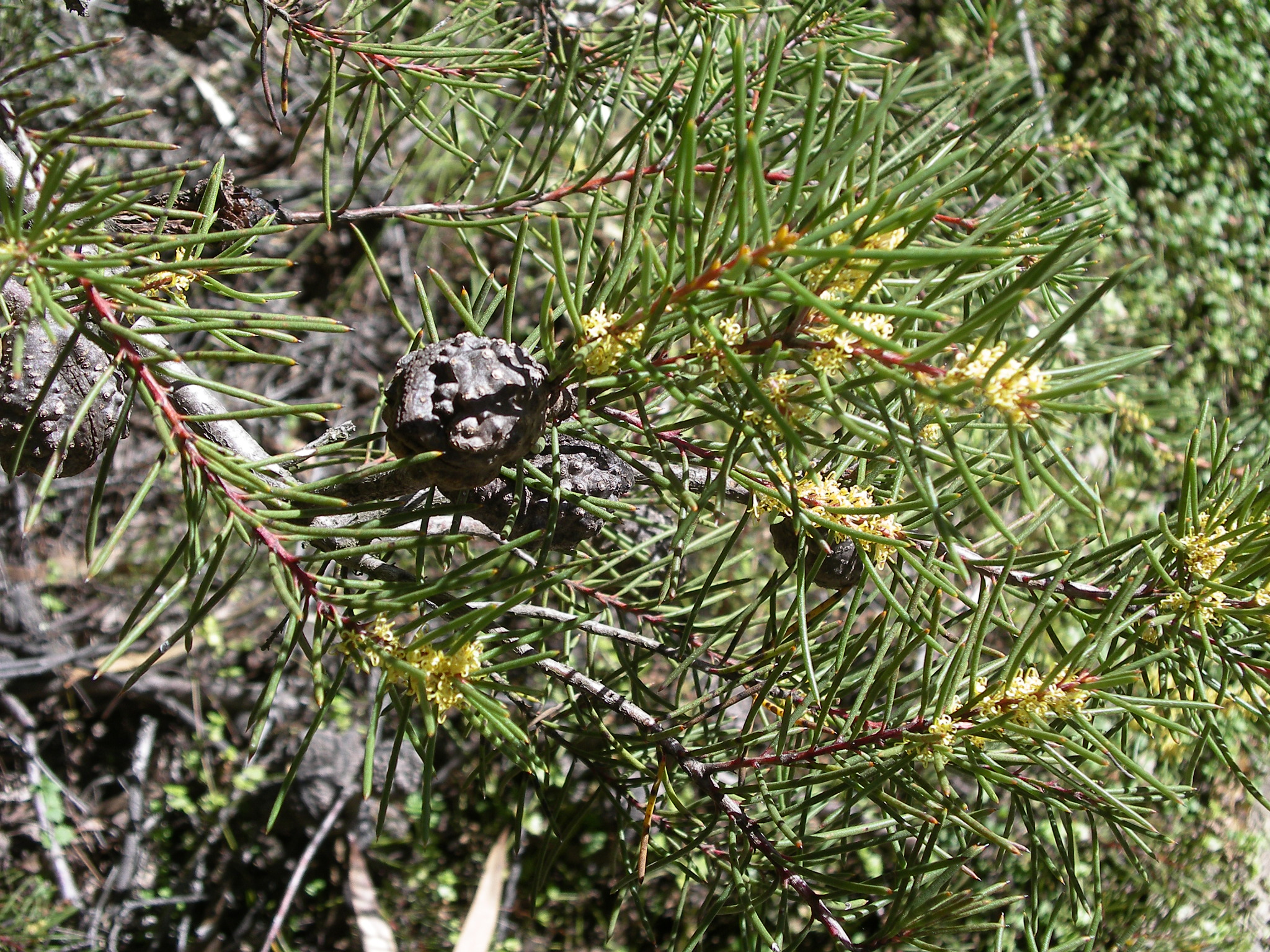

Scientific classification
- Kingdom: Plantae
- Clade: Embryophytes
- Clade: Tracheophytes
- Clade: Spermatophytes
- Clade: Angiosperms
- Clade: Eudicots
- Order: Proteales
- Family: Proteaceae
- Genus: Hakea
- Species: H. pachyphylla

Binomial name
- Hakea pachyphylla Sieber ex Spreng.
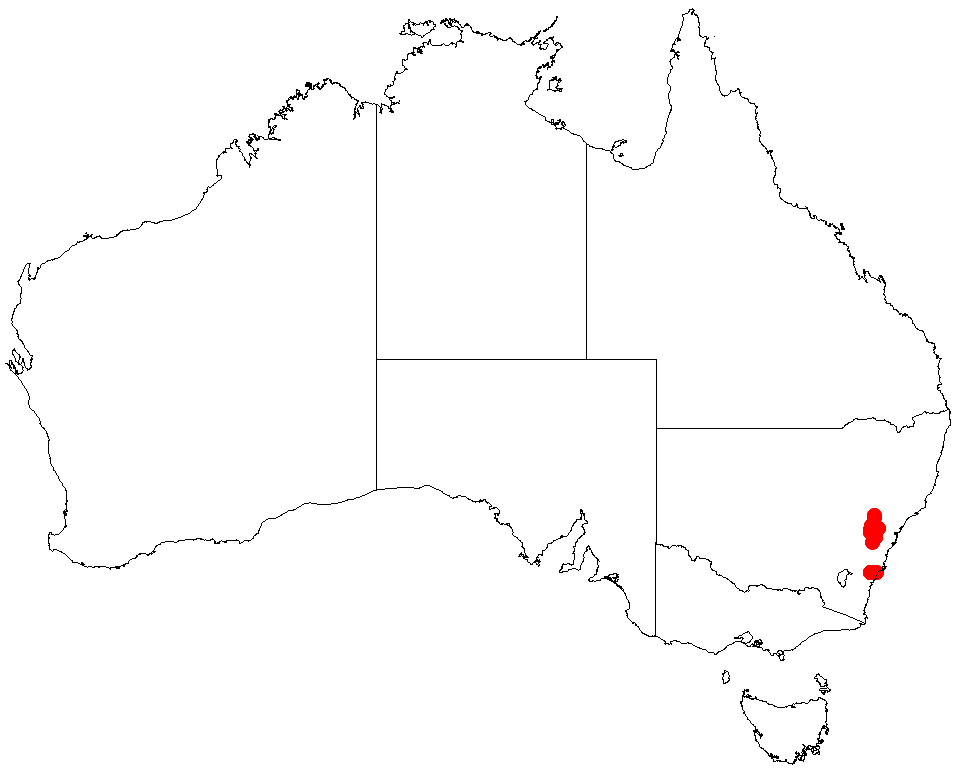
- Occurrence data from Australasian Virtual Herbarium

= Hakea pachyphylla =

Species of shrub endemic to Australia

Hakea pachyphylla is a species of flowering plant in the family Proteaceae. It is endemic to the upper Blue Mountains in New South Wales, Australia. It is a small shrub with stiff, needle-shaped leaves and clusters of yellow flowers. Formerly thought to be a Blue Mountains form of Hakea propinqua.

== Description ==
Hakea pachyphylla is a non lignotuberous compact to spreading single stemmed shrub growing to 0.3–2 m (1–7 ft) high. The inflorescence consists of 1-7 yellow flowers that appear in axillary clusters in spring. The white main stalk is 0.5–1.2 mm (0.02–0.05 in) long densely covered with short matted hairs. The small branches are ribbed and densely covered with soft mid-red matted hairs quickly becoming smooth or on occasion remain until flowering. The stiff needle-like leaves vary in length between 1–5.5 cm (0.4–2 in) long and 1.1–1.8 mm (0.04–0.07 in) wide with sparse flat hairs but quickly becoming smooth ending with a small point. Flowers occur from August to October followed by oval shaped fruit with small blunt wart-like protuberances 2.9–3.5 cm (1–1 in) long and 2.3–2.6 cm (0.9–1 in) wide with a short broad beak with obscure or no horns.

== Taxonomy and naming ==
Hakea pachyphylla was first formally described in 1827 by Curt Sprengel from an unpublished description by Franz Sieber in Systema Vegetabilium. The specific epithet (pachyphylla) means 'thick-leaved'.

== Distribution and habitat ==
Hakea pachyphylla has a restricted distribution occurring only in the Mount Victoria – Leura – Newnes area in swamp or heath or mallee-heath, occasionally on sandstone.
