= Gynatrix macrophylla =

Scientific classification
- Kingdom: Plantae
- Clade: Tracheophytes
- Clade: Angiosperms
- Clade: Eudicots
- Clade: Rosids
- Order: Malvales
- Family: Malvaceae
- Genus: Gynatrix
- Species: G. macrophylla

Binomial name
- Gynatrix macrophylla N.G.Walsh

Species of flowering plant

Gynatrix macrophylla, known commonly as the Gippsland hemp bush, is a species of shrub or small tree in the family Malvaceae that is endemic to Victoria in Australia.

== Habitat & distribution ==
The species is known to primarily inhabit open bushland, wet forest and sclerophyll woodland in or near the Australian Alps, with isolated occurrences west of Ballarat and near Foster.

== Description ==
It can grow as a shrub or tree to a height of 5 metres. The species has a perennial life cycle and is dioecious. It is capable of flowering all year round. The species features dehiscent mericarp fruit. The leaves have toothed crenate margins with an ovate or widely ovate leaf shape - they have a length of 180 mm and a width of 140mm.

== Conservation ==
It is recognised as a threatened species under the Flora and Fauna Guarantee Act 1988 in Victoria.
