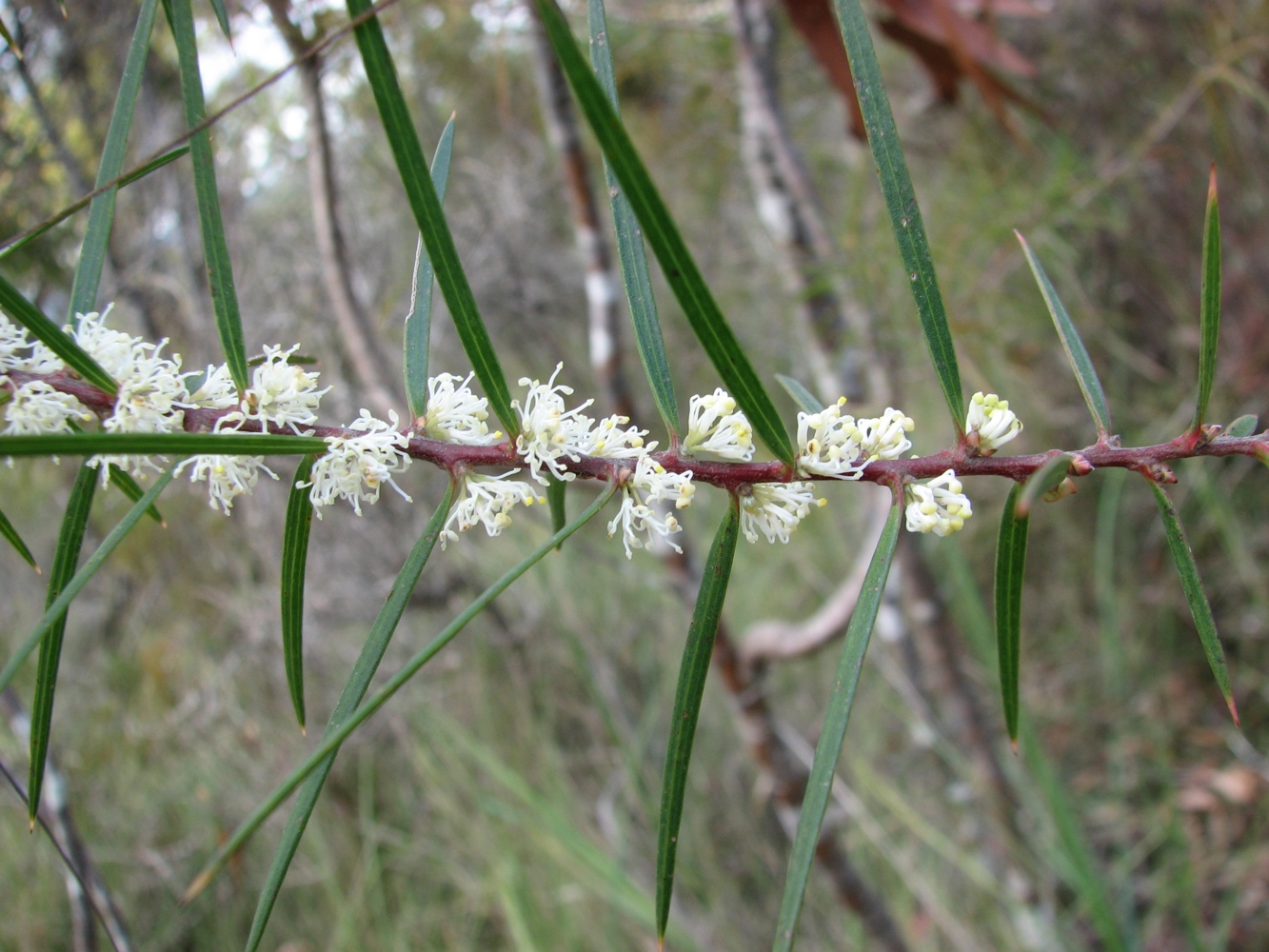
- Hakea ulicina in Bunyip State Park, Victoria

Conservation status
- Least Concern (IUCN 3.1)

Scientific classification
- Kingdom: Plantae
- Clade: Tracheophytes
- Clade: Angiosperms
- Clade: Eudicots
- Order: Proteales
- Family: Proteaceae
- Genus: Hakea
- Species: H. ulicina

Binomial name
- Hakea ulicina R.Br.

= Hakea ulicina =

Furze hakea

Species of shrub native to Australia

Hakea ulicina, commonly known as furze hakea, is a shrub in the family Proteaceae and endemic to Victoria, Australia. It has stiff, long, narrow leaves and creamy-white flowers.

== Description ==
Hakea ulicina is an erect shrub or small tree growing between 2–5 m (7–20 ft) tall, resprouting from a lignotuber. The leaves are mostly linear, curving, rigid, 3–18 cm (1–7 in) long and 1–4 mm (0.04–0.2 in) wide with 1-3 prominent longitudinal veins on the upper and lower surface. The white flowers are borne in clusters of 6-18 in leaf axils, and the pistil 4–6 mm (0.16–0.24 in) long. Flowering occurs from late winter to spring and the fruit are ovate or obliquely ovate 1.6–2.5 cm (0.6–1 in) long by 8–11 cm (3–4 in) wide with a short, straight, pointed beak.

== Taxonomy and naming ==
Hakea ulicina was first formally described by Robert Brown in Supplementum primum prodromi florae Novae Hollandiae in 1830, based on plant material collected by William Baxter in Wilsons Promontory. The specific epithet (ulicina) means Ulex-like.

== Distribution and habitat ==
Furze hakea occurs on the southern slopes of the Great Dividing Range as well as in coastal heathland. It is mostly found from the east of Port Phillip Bay in Victoria through to Eden in south-eastern New South Wales. Additional populations occur in the Brisbane Ranges and Anglesea to the west of Port Phillip Bay, as well as Tasmania's Furneaux Group of islands. A similar species from South Australia and western Victoria, Hakea repullulans, can be distinguished by its broader leaves and presence of a lignotuber.

== Conservation status ==
Hakea ulicina is listed as "vulnerable" under the Tasmanian Government Threatened Species Protection Act 1995.
