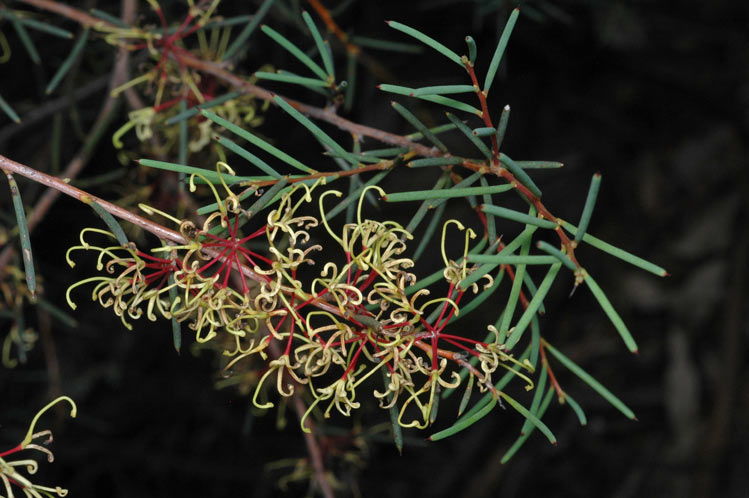
- Hakea commutata in the ANBG

Scientific classification
- Kingdom: Plantae
- Clade: Tracheophytes
- Clade: Angiosperms
- Clade: Eudicots
- Order: Proteales
- Family: Proteaceae
- Genus: Hakea
- Species: H. commutata

Binomial name
- Hakea commutata F.Muell.
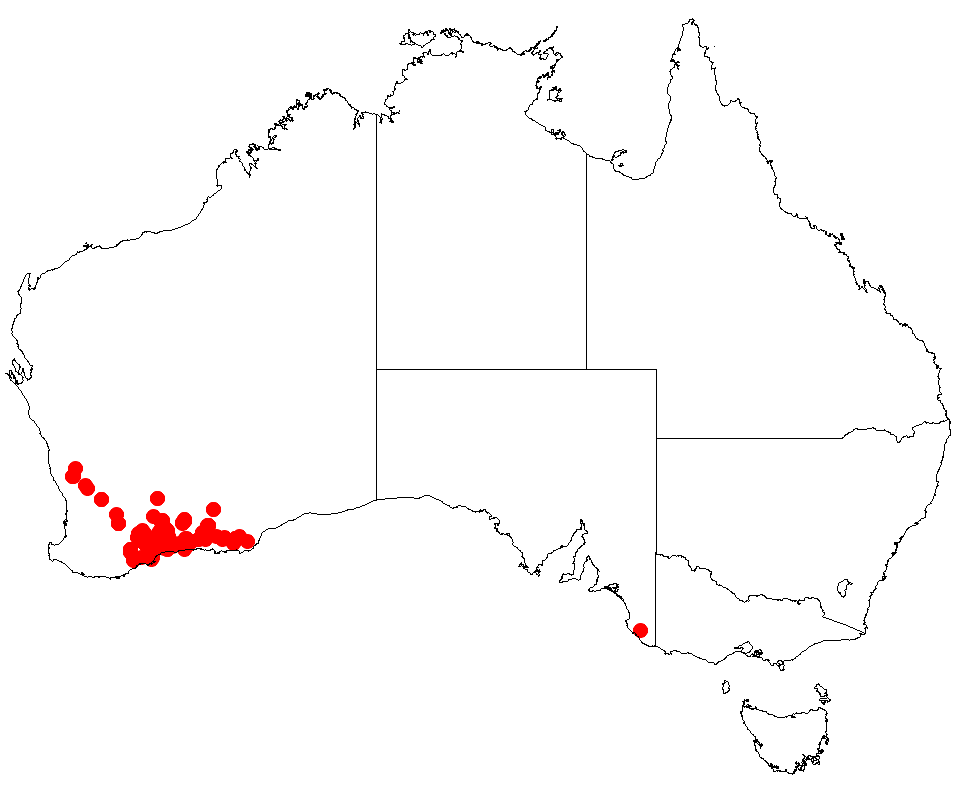
- Occurrence data from Australasian Virtual Herbarium

= Hakea commutata =

Species of shrub native to Western Australia

Hakea commutata is a shrub in the family Proteaceae native to Western Australia. A variable species in shape and growing requirements, including mallee heath, sand and along creek lines.

== Description ==
Hakea commutata is a lignotuberous straggly or dense rigid shrub with a rounded habit growing to 0.5 to 3 metres (2 to 10 ft) high. Needle-shaped leaves are 1 to 3.5 centimetres (0.39 to 1.38 in) long and 1 to 1.7 millimetres (0.039 to 0.067 in) wide ending in a point 0.7–1.4 mm (0.03–0.06 in) long. Leaves are bluish-green with a whitish powdery covering, smooth or sparsely covered in coarse rough hairs and small protuberances. The inflorescence have 8–12 flowers either in leaf axils or at the end of branches. The cream-white to yellow perianth is 3 to 3.5 mm (0.118 to 0.138 in) in length and tinged red at the base. The pistil is 7.5 to 11.5 mm (0.30 to 0.45 in) and has an oblique pollen presenter. Red-pink and cream-white flowers appear from September to November, occasionally into December. Woody brown finely wrinkled fruit are obliquely oval shaped 2 to 3.2 cm (0.79 to 1.26 in) long and 1.1 to 1.7 cm (0.43 to 0.67 in) wide. The black to dark brown seeds have a wing down one side and are 13.5 to 19 mm (0.53 to 0.75 in) long. The seed takes a mean time of 23 days to germinate.

== Taxonomy ==
Hakea commutata was first formally described by botanist Ferdinand von Mueller in 1865 as part of the work Fragmenta Phytographiae Australiae. The only synonym is Hakea nodosa. The specific epithet commutata is a Latin word meaning "with change" Mueller adopted the epithet falsely believing the leaves in this species were variable.

== Distribution ==
It is endemic to an area in the Wheatbelt and Goldfields–Esperance regions from about Toodyay in the north to Fitzgerald River National Park in the south west and Cape Arid National Park in the south east. It is found along watercourses and among granite outcrops growing in sandy-loam or clay soils and is usually part of mallee heath communities or mallee communities over laterite.

== Conservation status ==
Hakea commutata is classified as "not threatened" by the Western Australian GovernmentDepartment of Parks and Wildlife.
