= Belgrave Heights Christian School =

Location
- Belgrave Heights, Victoria; Australia; 37°55′12″S 145°20′42″E

Information
- Type: Independent, co-educational, day school
- Motto: Act justly, love mercy and walk humbly
- Denomination: Presbyterian
- Established: 1983
- Principal: Peter Cliffe
- Key people: Lynette Thompson, Jenny McCallam, Isabel Bell (Founders)
- Enrolment: ~840 (Approximately)
- Colours: Black, white, green and charcoal
- Website: www.bhcs.vic.edu.au

Belgrave Heights Christian School is an, independent, co-educational, Presbyterian school located in Belgrave Heights on the edge of the Dandenong Ranges. The school is located 32 km (20 mi) east of Melbourne, Victoria, Australia. It is an open-enrolment school, and is a member of Christian Schools Australia.

== History ==
Belgrave Heights Christian School was founded in 1983 by Lynette Thompson, Jenny McCallam and Isabel Bell. The school was established at the Belgrave Heights Presbyterian Campsite, and began as a Primary School.

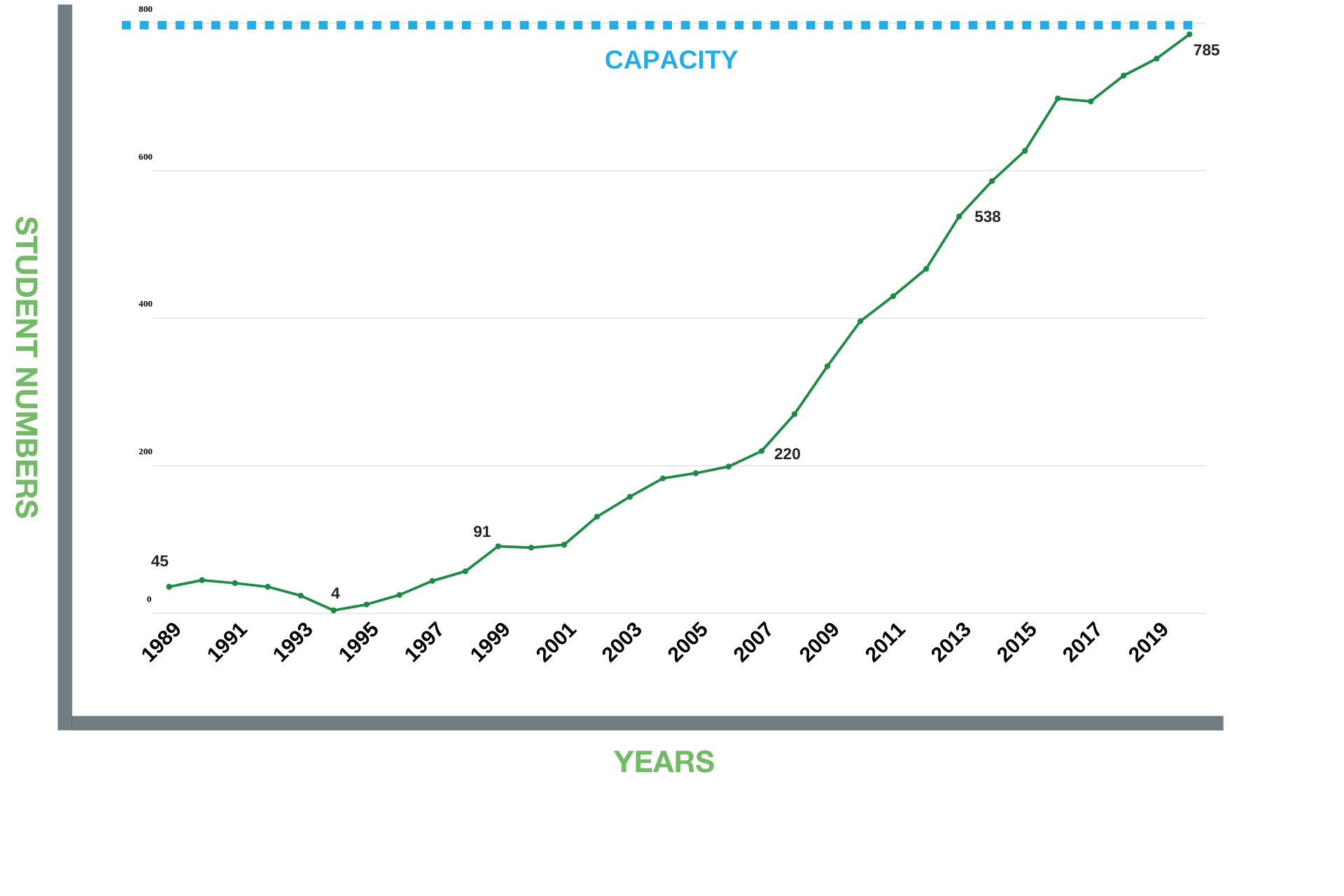
Belgrave Heights Christian School's total enrolments from 1989 to 2020.

In the early 1990's, the school's enrolments declined from approximately 45, to a total of four students. This led to a temporary arrangement with Hillcrest Christian College, which allowed the school's numbers to increase again.

In 2002, the school began transitioning into both a Primary and Secondary School progressively adding secondary year levels.

In 2004, Andy Callow was appointed to the position of school principal. At the start of 2022, Andy Callow was replaced as principal by Peter Cliffe.

In 2013, a Kindergarten was opened providing a purpose-built facility for early years education.

Facilities include a gymnasium, cafe, and kitchen; primary school building; sports courts; technology and arts centre, and a playground. The school is situated in the foothills of the Dandenong Ranges, with Monbulk Creek bordering one side of the school property.

== See also ==
- Belgrave
- Belgrave Heights
