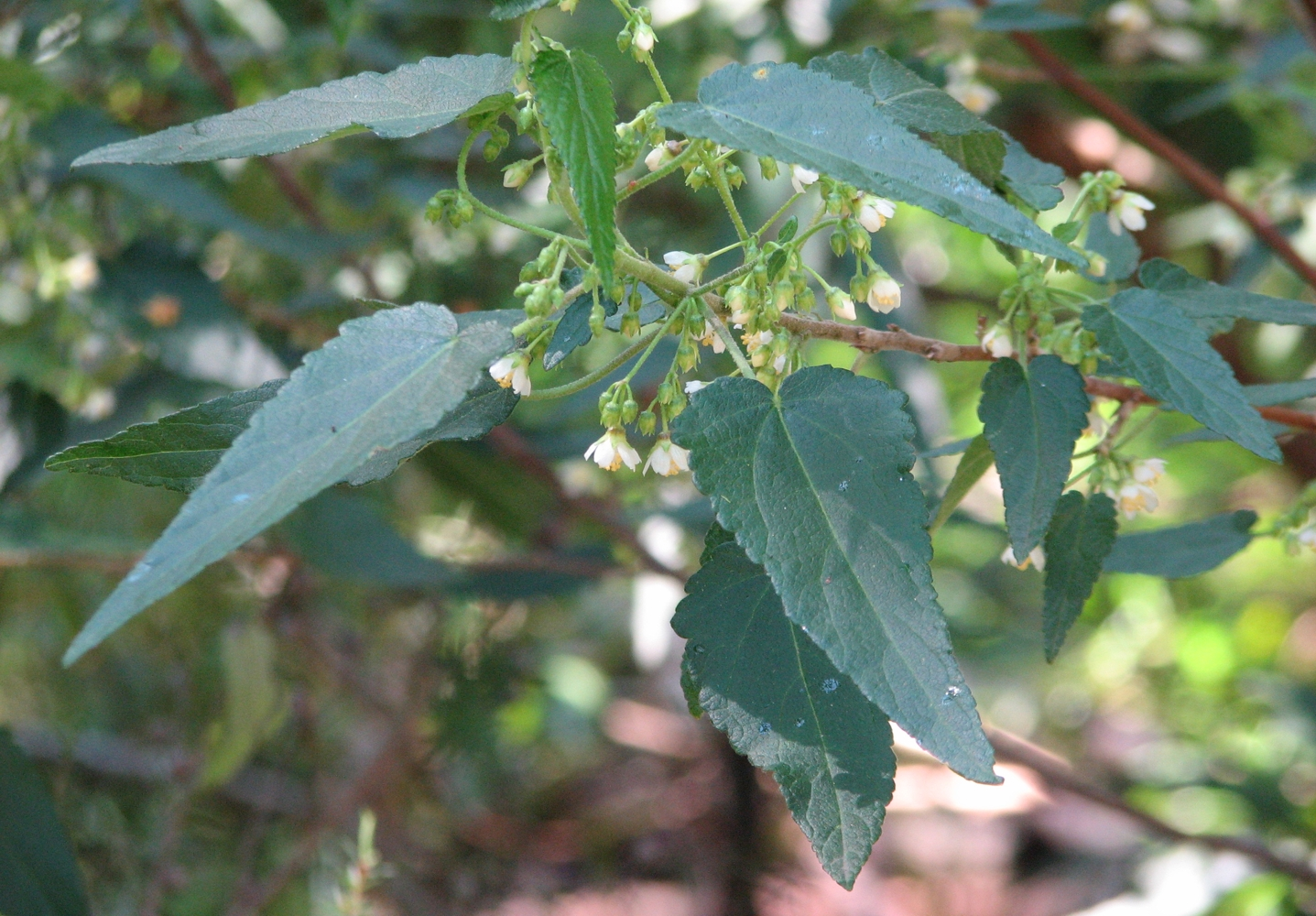
- Gynatrix pulchella at Mount Waverley, Victoria

Scientific classification
- Kingdom: Plantae
- Clade: Tracheophytes
- Clade: Angiosperms
- Clade: Eudicots
- Clade: Rosids
- Order: Malvales
- Family: Malvaceae
- Subfamily: Malvoideae
- Tribe: Malveae
- Genus: Gynatrix; Alef.

Species
- See text

= Gynatrix =

Species of plant in the mallow family

Gynatrix is a genus of dioecious flowering plants in the family Malvaceae, endemic to south-east Australia.

There are two species within the genus:

- Gynatrix pulchella (Willd.) Alef. – (Hemp bush, Aboriginal hemp), a shrub to 3 metres (9.8 ft) in height with white or cream flowers that occurs in New South Wales, the Australian Capital Territory, Victoria and Tasmania.
- Gynatrix macrophylla N.G.Walsh – (Gippsland hemp bush), a rare shrub that occurs in eastern Victoria.
