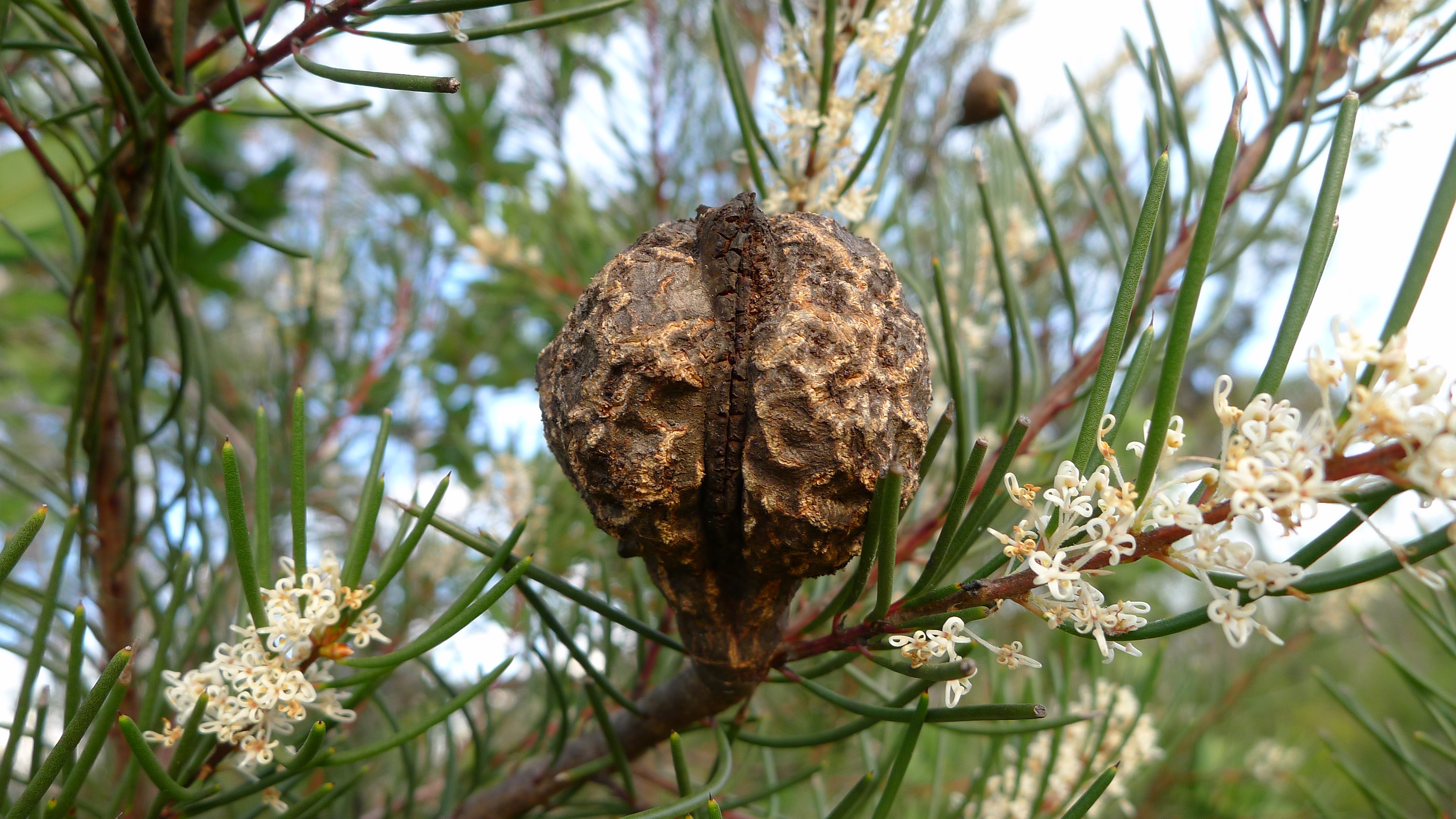

Scientific classification
- Kingdom: Plantae
- Clade: Tracheophytes
- Clade: Angiosperms
- Clade: Eudicots
- Order: Proteales
- Family: Proteaceae
- Genus: Hakea
- Species: H. propinqua

Binomial name
- Hakea propinqua A.Cunn.
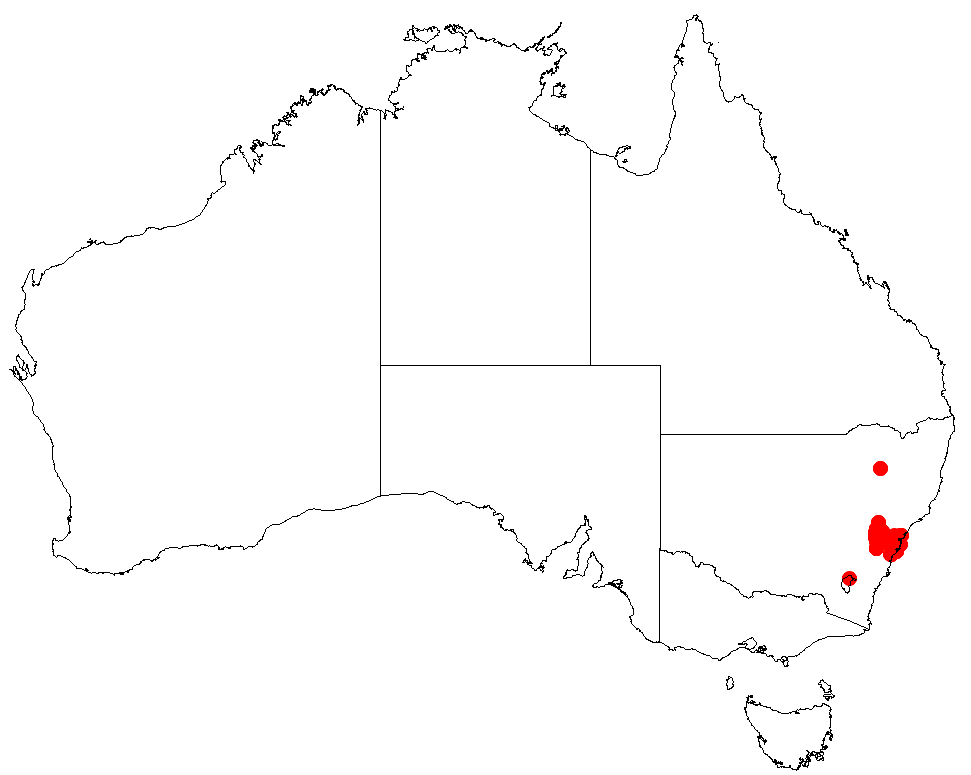
- Occurrence data from Australasian Virtual Herbarium

= Hakea propinqua =

Species of shrub endemic to Australia

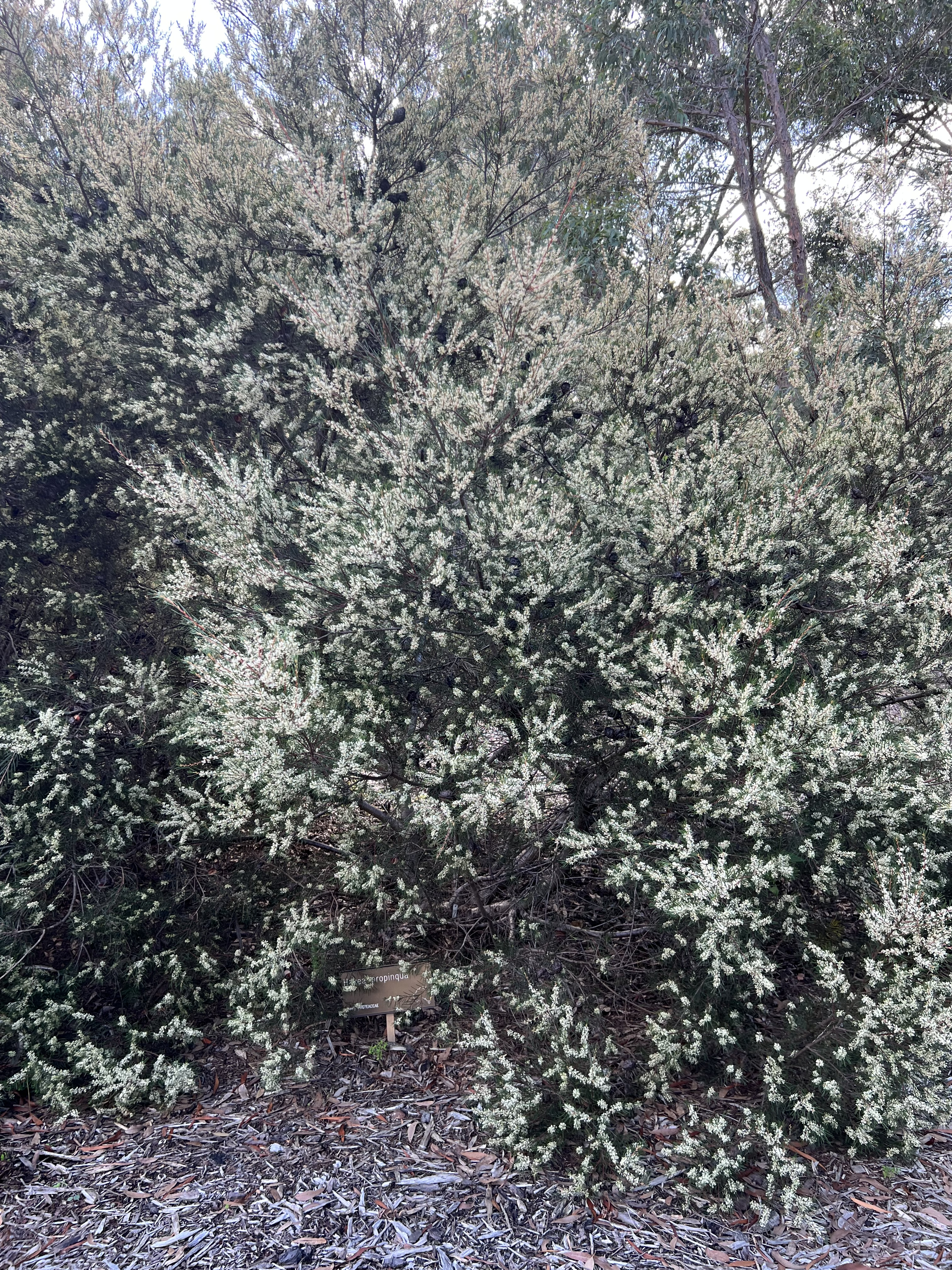
Habit

Hakea propinqua is a flowering shrub in the family Proteaceae. It is a common shrub found in heathlands near Sydney. It has sharp, needle-shaped leaves, white unpleasantly scented flowers and large warty fruit.

== Description ==
Hakea propinqua is a bushy shrub 1–4 m (3–10 ft) tall with unpleasantly scented, small, pale yellow or white flowers occurring in umbels along branchlets in leaf axils. The leaves are thin, terete, about 3 cm (1 in) long, 1 mm (0.04 in) wide, ending with a sharp tip about 1 mm (0.04 in) long. The leaves are softer and at a smaller angle to the stem than the related Needlebush. The warty fruit are egg shaped-elliptic 3.5–4.5 cm (1–2 in) long and 2.5–3 cm (1–1 in) wide ending with two small horns.

== Taxonomy and naming ==
Hakea propinqua was first formally described in 1825 by Allan Cunningham and the description was published in Geographical Memoirs on New South Wales. The species name is derived from the Latin propinquus, meaning near, referring to the similarity to Hakea nodosa.

== Distribution and habitat ==
Hakea propinqua grows from coast to ranges on sand or light loam over sandstone in woodland and heath in the Sydney region to the Blue Mountains.
