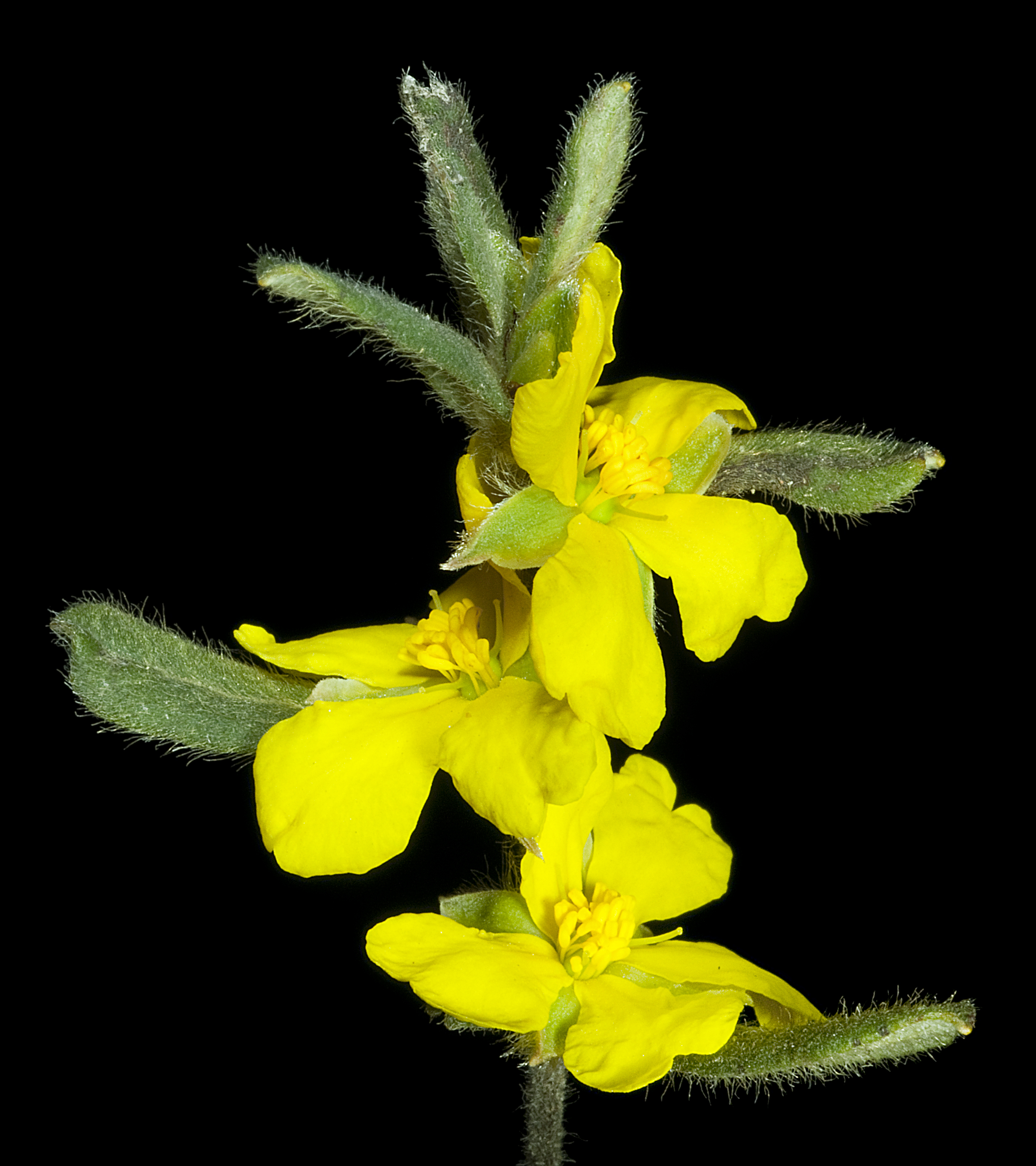

Scientific classification
- Kingdom: Plantae
- Clade: Embryophytes
- Clade: Tracheophytes
- Clade: Spermatophytes
- Clade: Angiosperms
- Clade: Eudicots
- Order: Dilleniales
- Family: Dilleniaceae
- Genus: Hibbertia
- Species: H. commutata

Binomial name
- Hibbertia commutata Steud.

Synonyms
- Hibbertia confertifolia Steud.; Hibbertia discolor Steud.; Hibbertia glomerata var. canescens Benth. p.p.; Hibbertia montana var. confertifolia Benth.; Hibbertia montana auct. non Steud.: Bentham, G. (1863)

= Hibbertia commutata =

Species of flowering plant

Hibbertia commutata is a species of flowering plant in the family Dilleniaceae and is endemic to the south-west of Western Australia. It is a low, erect, many-branched shrub with narrow elliptic to narrow egg-shaped leaves, and yellow flowers with fifteen to thirty stamens arranged around three carpels.

== Description ==
Hibbertia commutata is an erect to sprawling, many-branched shrub that typically grows to a height of 10–60 cm (3.9–23.6 in), sometimes to 1 m (3 ft 3 in) high and has sparsely hairy foliage. Its leaves are narrow elliptic to narrow egg-shaped with the narrower end towards the base, 6–40 mm (0.24–1.57 in) long and 2–11 mm (0.079–0.433 in) long, the edges sometimes slightly wavy. The flowers are sessile, 10–20 mm (0.39–0.79 in) in diameter with silky-hairy sepals and fifteen to thirty stamens alternating with the three glabrous carpels. Flowering occurs between July and November.

== Taxonomy ==
Hibbertia commutata was first formally described by the botanist Ernst Gottlieb von Steudel in 1845 in Johann Georg Christian Lehmann's Plantae Preissianae. The specific epithet (commutata) means "changed" or "altered", referring to the variability of the leaves.

The name H. commutata was partly misapplied to Hibbertia pilosa in Wheeler's 1987 publication, Flora of the Perth Region.

== Distribution and habitat ==
This hibbertia grows in lateritic soils and is widely distributed in the south-west of Western Australia, occurring in the Avon Wheatbelt, Esperance Plains, Jarrah Forest, Swan Coastal Plain and Warren biogeographic regions.

== See also ==
- List of Hibbertia species
