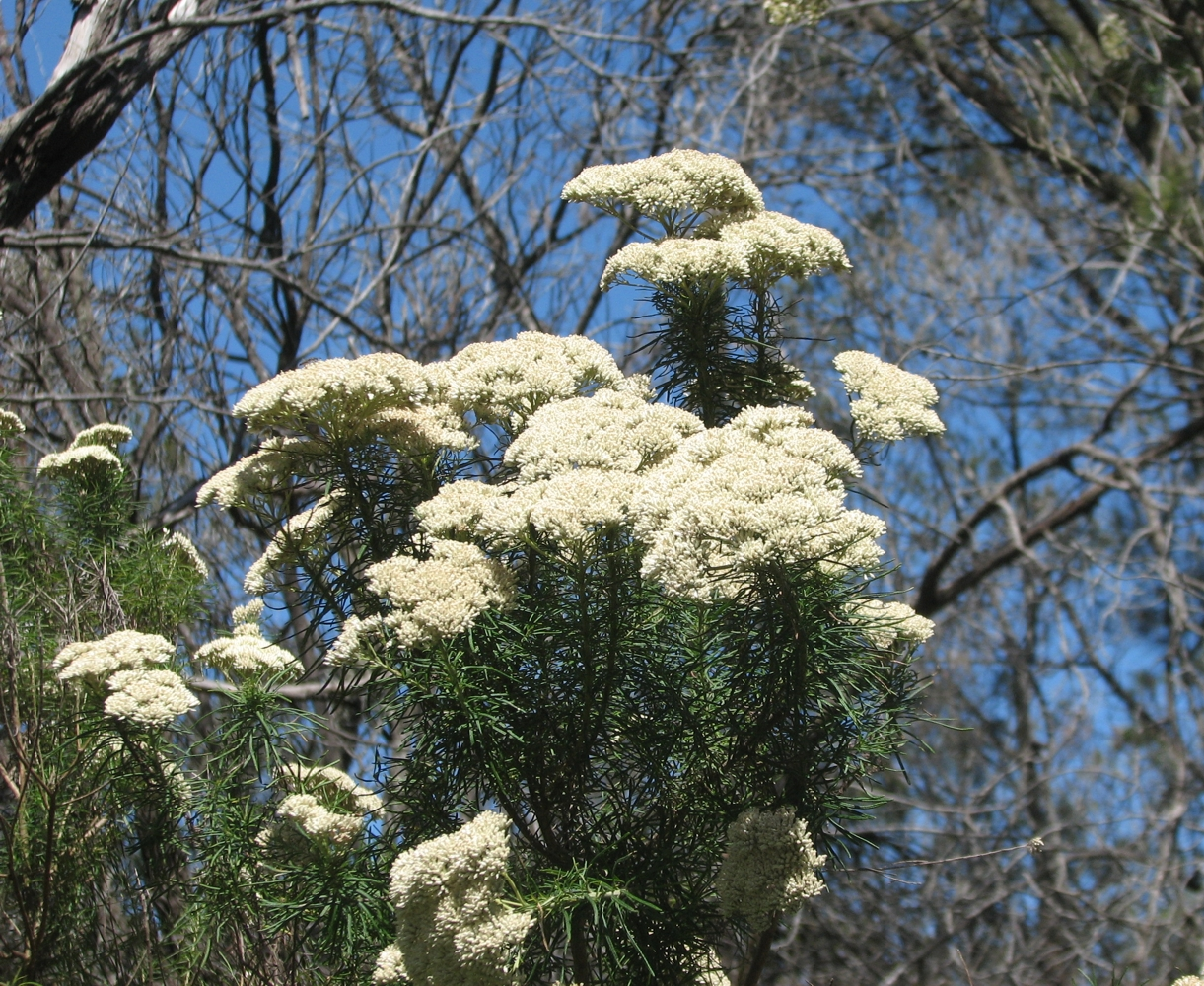
- Ozothamnus ferrugineus, Mornington Peninsula, Victoria

Scientific classification
- Kingdom: Plantae
- Clade: Tracheophytes
- Clade: Angiosperms
- Clade: Eudicots
- Clade: Asterids
- Order: Asterales
- Family: Asteraceae
- Genus: Ozothamnus
- Species: O. ferrugineus

Binomial name
- Ozothamnus ferrugineus (Labill.) Sweet

Synonyms
- Chrysocoma ferruginea (Labill.) Spreng. Eupatorium ferrugineum Labill. Helichrysum dendroideum N.A.Wakef. Helichrysum ferrugineum R.Lesson ex Steud. nom. illeg. Petalolepis ferruginea (Labill.) Cass

= Ozothamnus ferrugineus =

Tree everlasting

Species of plant

Ozothamnus ferrugineus, commonly known as tree everlasting, is a member of the genus Ozothamnus, of the Asteraceae family – one of the largest families of flowering plants in Australia. Native to the Australian states of New South Wales, Victoria, South Australia, and Tasmania, it forms an erect shrub or small tree between 2 and 3 metres in height.

== Description ==
Ozothamnus ferrugineus forms a medium to large erect, much-branched woody shrub that is aromatic, with an open habit. It generally grows to 2-3 metres in height, reaching 1.5-3 metres width. Fine hairs are concentrated in lines running along the stem and crowded leaves extend alternately from cottony branchlets. Younger leaves are light green in colour and sticky to the touch, maturing to darker green leaves with a glabrous, resiny adaxial surface, and a lighter grey, densely hairy abaxial surface with a glabrescent midrib. They are flat, fine and spreading, 2-7cm long and linear to lanceolate in shape, with pointed tips and slightly wavy margins.

Flowering occurs in the summer months. O. ferrugineus inflorescence amusingly resembles cauliflower heads, composed of 80–300 densely-packed small white daisies. These florets are in 5–6 compact hemispherical corymbose terminal clusters. Each flowerhead is cylindrical to bell-shaped, 3-5mm long with a 1-4mm diameter, and remain on the bush for long periods. Appressed to the base of the flowerheads are 14–18 small bracts. The lower half of the inner bracts are translucent, whilst the upper half is an opaque white. The outer bracts are golden brown to green in colour.

Flowering produces a cypsela, oft characteristic of the Asteraceae family. Theirs is a dry, single seeded fruit, narrow to ovoid in shape, 1mm long. The calyx is modified into a pappus composed of 2-3mm long bristles, aiding seed dispersal via wind.

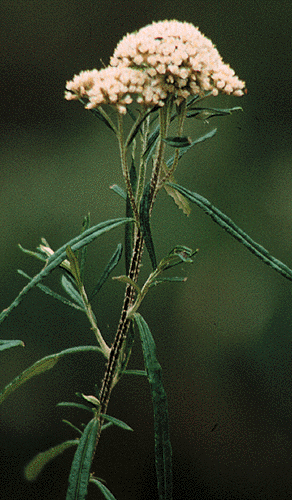
Ozothamnus ferrugineus terminal inflorescence, showing distinguishing hairs running parallel down stems. Photo: Rob Wiltshire, UTAS.

=== Distinguishing features ===
Generally, bract characters are key to distinguishing Cassinia from Ozothamnus, whereby the involucral bracts of Ozothamnus are straight or radiating and lacking paleae between florets, whilst Cassinia possess paleae and their involucral bracts are connivent. O. ferrugineus is often mistaken for Cassinia aculeata, however, where C. aculeata's leaves are revolute or recurved, O. ferrugineus' leaves are flat or only slightly recurved. Furthermore, the hairs on O. ferrugineus' stem are arranged in neat parallel lines, whilst the stems of C. aculeata are more uniformly hairy. O. ferrugineus can also be confused with Ozothamnus thyrsoideus which occurs in similar habitats but whose flowers are spread along branches rather than in terminal bunches.

== Habitat and distribution ==
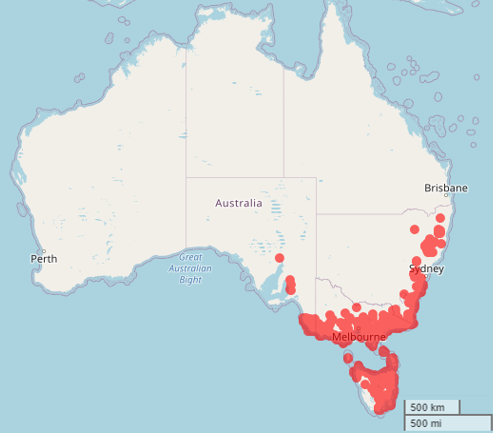
Map showing recorded Ozothamnus ferrugineus observations in Australia. Map created with Atlas of Living Australia data.

Ozothamnus ferrugineus is a common and widespread middle understory species in open forests and scrubland throughout south-eastern Australia. It can be found from coastal swampland and scrub through to elevated ranges and tablelands throughout Victoria, South Australia, New South Wales, and Tasmania, often persisting along roadsides. It prefers well drained, moist areas and is often one of the first species to regenerate after fire or other disturbances.

== Classification ==
=== Taxonomy ===
The first recorded description of O. ferrugineus was by French botanist Jacques Labillardière in 1806 in Novae Hollandiae Plantarum Specimen, a two-volume work describing Australia's natural flora. O. ferrugineus was then described as 'Eupatorium ferrugineum.' He details the abaxial leaf surface as being reddish-brown, hence 'ferrugineum,' which is Latin for rust-like or reddish-brown:

"...foliis lineari-lanceolatis, aveniis, adultis subtùs ferrugineis."

In English, this is "linear-lanceolate leaves, beneath reddish brown."

This rust-related name persists to this day, however, is misleading, as the underside of O. ferrugineus' leaves are distinctly light-grey to white in colour. Ozothamnus is the largest genus in the Gnaphalieae 'everlasting' tribe, comprising 50 species. It was first recognised in the early 19th century, however, was circumscribed as Helichrysum for 124 years before being reinstated as Ozothamnus in 1991.

== Cultivation ==
Reproduction from seed is O. ferrugineus' main form of regeneration. Seeds should be directly sown in early winter, as slow-growing seedlings can be vulnerable to spring drought. Plant is long lived, as are its flowers. Prefers full-sun to semi-shade.

== Ecology ==
Ozothamnus ferrugineus can resprout if above ground parts are killed or experiencing severe disturbance, including fire. Despite its highly flammable foliage, it will persist through average-severity bushfires. It is often one of the first species to appear after a disturbance event. Its seeds are wind dispersed, using its pappus to travel.
