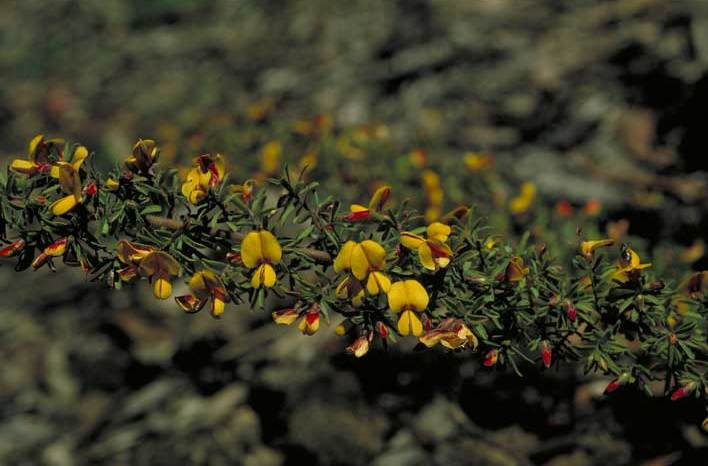
- Pultenaea hispidula in the Australian National Botanic Gardens

Scientific classification
- Kingdom: Plantae
- Clade: Tracheophytes
- Clade: Angiosperms
- Clade: Eudicots
- Clade: Rosids
- Order: Fabales
- Family: Fabaceae
- Subfamily: Faboideae
- Genus: Pultenaea
- Species: P. hispidula

Binomial name
- Pultenaea hispidula R.Br. ex Benth.

= Pultenaea hispidula =

Rusty bush-pea

Species of flowering plant

Pultenaea hispidula, commonly known as rusty bush-pea, is a species of flowering plant in the family Fabaceae and is endemic to south-eastern continental Australia. It is an erect, spreading shrub with many drooping branches, oblong to egg-shaped leaves with the narrower end towards the base, and yellow to pale orange and red flowers.

== Description ==
Pultenaea hispidula is an erect, spreading shrub with many drooping, densely hairy branches and that typically grows to a height of about 1 m (3 ft 3 in). The leaves are oblong to egg-shaped leaves with the narrower end towards the base, 4–8 mm (0.16–0.31 in) long and 0.7–3 mm (0.028–0.118 in) wide with lance-shaped stipules 1–2 mm (0.039–0.079 in) long at the base. The flowers are arranged in leaf axils in dense clusters near the ends of short side branches. They are 5–8 mm (0.20–0.31 in) long on pedicels 1–2 mm (0.039–0.079 in) long with broadly egg-shaped to narrow lance-shaped bracteoles 2.5–4 mm (0.098–0.157 in) long attached near the base of the sepal tube. The sepals are 3–5.5 mm (0.12–0.22 in) long, the standard petal is yellow to pale orange with red markings on the back and 6–10 mm (0.24–0.39 in) wide, the wings are yellow and the keel red or crimson. Flowering occurs from August to December and the fruit is an egg-shaped pod 4–5 mm (0.16–0.20 in) long.

== Taxonomy and naming ==
Pultenaea hispidula was first formally described in 1864 by George Bentham in Flora Australiensis from an unpublished description by Robert Brown who collected the type specimens near the Georges River. The specific epithet (hispidula) means "hispid".

== Distribution and habitat ==
Rusty bush-pea grows in forest, sometimes in heath and is found in coastal New South Wales, south from the Hawkesbury River, south of the Great Dividing Range in Victoria, and in the south east of South Australia.
