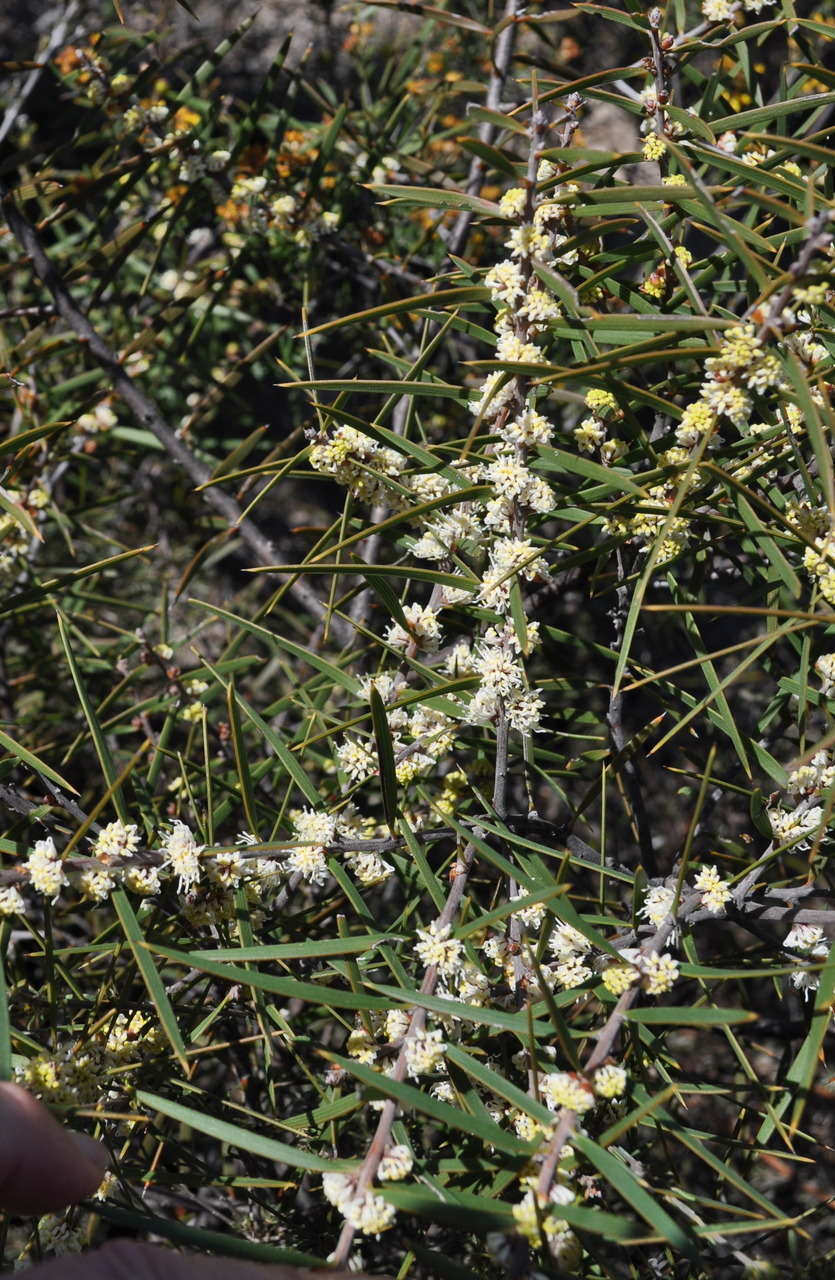

Scientific classification
- Kingdom: Plantae
- Clade: Tracheophytes
- Clade: Angiosperms
- Clade: Eudicots
- Order: Proteales
- Family: Proteaceae
- Genus: Hakea
- Species: H. repullulans

Binomial name
- Hakea repullulans H.M. Lee
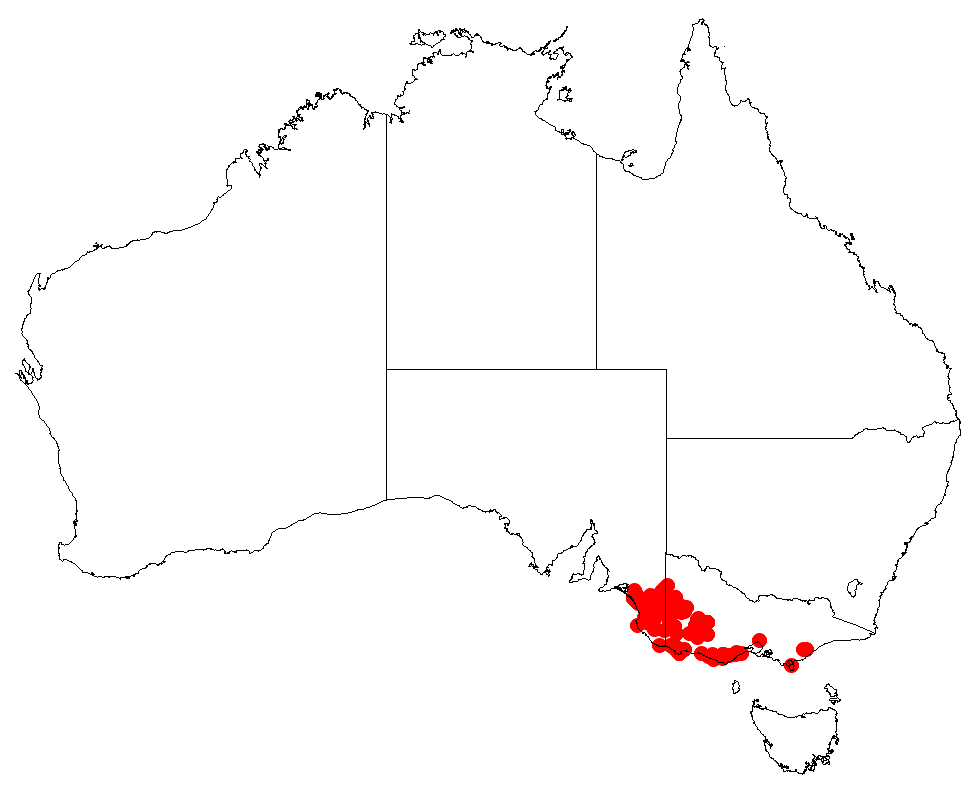
- Occurrence data from AVH

= Hakea repullulans =

Furze hakea

Species of plant found in Victoria and South Australia

Hakea repullulans, commonly known as the furze hakea, is a flowering plant in the family Proteaceae found in Victoria and South Australia.

== Description ==
Hakea repullulans is an erect shrub growing 1.2–4 m (4–10 ft) tall. It resprouts from a lignotuber often suckering from horizontal roots. The branchlets are densely covered with short, soft, matted hairs and become smooth at flowering. The leaves can be narrowly egg-shaped to long and narrow and twisted at the base 4–14 cm (2–6 in) long and 3–12 mm (0.1–0.5 in) wide with generally 3-5 prominent longitudinal veins above and below. Each inflorescence has 10–36 cream-white flowers appearing in the leaf axils. Flowering occurs mostly in spring and the fruit is obliquely egg-shaped, slightly curved towards apex, 1.5–2.6 cm (0.6–1 in) long, 0.8–1.3 cm (0.3–0.5 in) wide, and tapering to a small beak.

== Taxonomy and naming ==
Hakea repullulans was first formally described in 1984 by H.M. Lee and the description was published in the Australian Journal of Botany. It is named from the Latin repullulans for sprouting again, with reference to the lignotuberous resprouting and suckering habit of this species.

== Distribution and habitat ==
Furze hakea occurs from south-eastern South Australia to the Grampians National Park and western regions of Victoria and east to the Otway Ranges also near Sale in South Gippsland. This species grows in acidic sandy soil in sclerophyll forests and scattered populations in mallee-heath.
