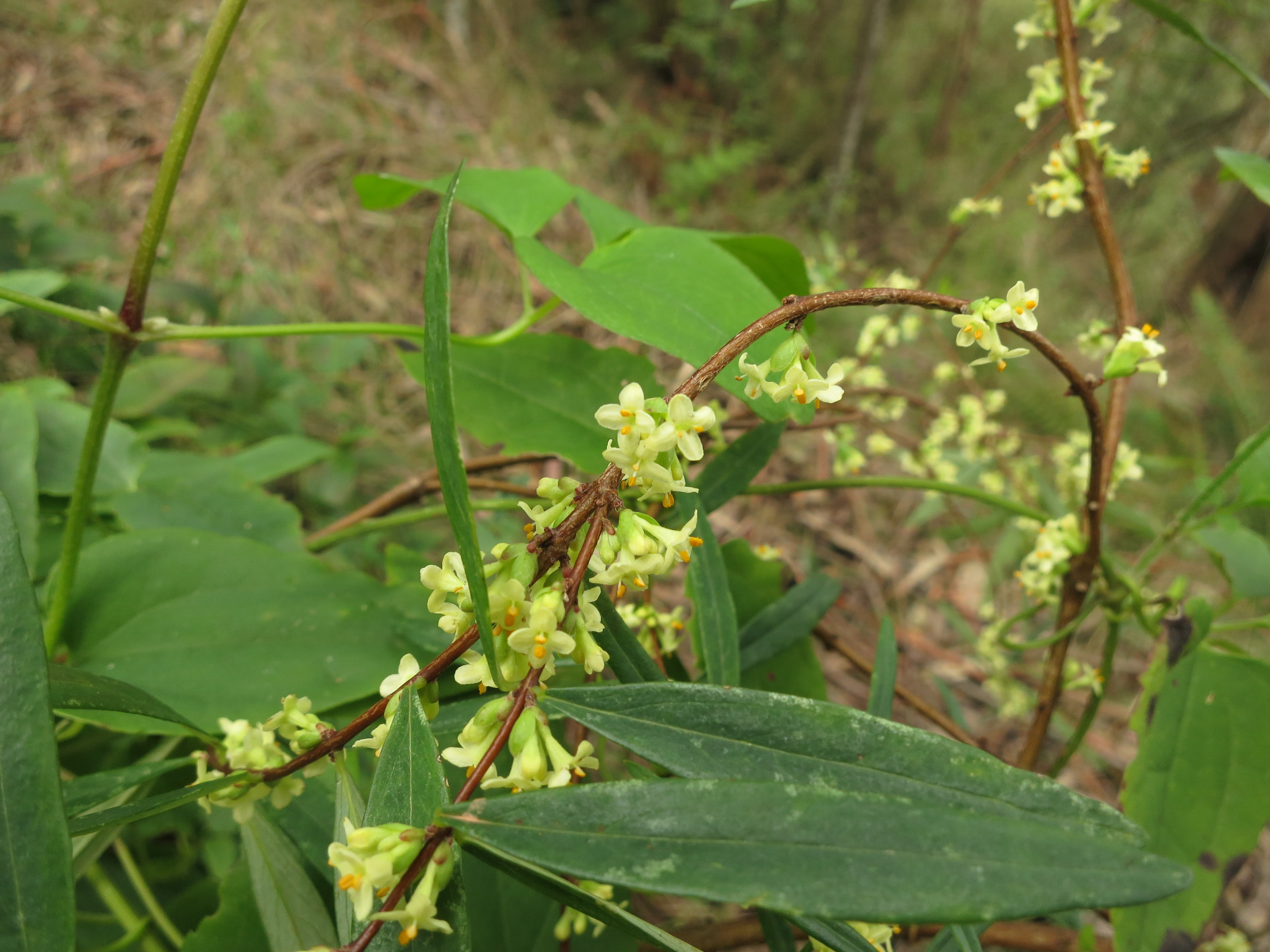
- Pimelea axiflora

Scientific classification
- Kingdom: Plantae
- Clade: Tracheophytes
- Clade: Angiosperms
- Clade: Eudicots
- Clade: Rosids
- Order: Malvales
- Family: Thymelaeaceae
- Genus: Pimelea
- Species: P. axiflora

Binomial name
- Pimelea axiflora F.Muell ex Meisn.

= Pimelea axiflora =

Bootlace bush

Species of shrub

Pimelea axiflora, commonly known as bootlace bush, is a small shrub in the family Thymelaeaceae and is endemic to Australia. It is a small shrub with whitish flowers on mostly smooth stems.

== Description ==
Pimelea axiflora is a small dioecious shrub 0.2–3 m (8 in – 9 ft 10 in) high with smooth stems or occasionally hairy. The leaves are arranged in opposite pairs are mostly linear or narrowly elliptic, upper surface mid-green, underside paler, 5–60 mm (0.20–2.36 in) long, 2–10 mm (0.079–0.394 in) wide on a petiole 3 mm (0.12 in) long. The leaves are green, smooth and leaf margins mostly recurved. The inflorescence consists of a cluster of 2-10 white flowers in leaf axils with little or no stalk. The male flowers are larger, 5–9 mm (0.20–0.35 in) long and female 3–6 mm (0.12–0.24 in) long. The 2-4 flower bracts are usually oval shaped and 1.5–7 mm (0.059–0.276 in) long and 1–2.5 mm (0.039–0.098 in) wide. The green fruit are 3–4 mm (0.12–0.16 in) long.

== Taxonomy ==
Pimelea axiflora was first formally described in 1854 by Carl Meisner and the description was published in Linnaea: ein Journal für die Botanik in ihrem ganzen Umfange, oder Beiträge zur Pflanzenkunde.

There are currently three subspecies accepted by the Australian Plant Census:

- Pimelea axiflora subsp. axiflora, has soft leaves 10–75 mm (0.39–2.95 in) long, flowers thickly covered with hairs on outside near petiole, bracts usually hairy on outside. Flowering occurs from June to December. In Tasmania it is restricted to King Island. In New South Wales it grows on the coast and ranges, south of the Budawang National Park to Braidwood. A single recording north of Cooma and rare in the Snowy Mountains. This subspecies grows in wetter locations as an understory shrub in eucalypt scrubland and near streams.
- Pimelea axiflora subsp. alpina (Benth.) Threlfall, commonly known as alpine bootlace bush, is a small shrub to 1 m (3 ft 3 in) high, sometimes semi-prostrate, smooth stems with leaf scars. The leaves are smooth, straight, leathery, 0.3–1.8 cm (0.12–0.71 in) long, 1–8 mm (0.039–0.315 in) wide and smooth bracts, 2-5 flowers in each cluster, moderate to infrequently hairy externally in montane locations. Male flowers are 4–6 mm (0.16–0.24 in) long, female 3–6 mm (0.12–0.24 in) long and the bracts are brown, smooth and usually 2–4 mm (0.079–0.157 in) long. This species grows at higher altitudes in the Snowy Mountains in open heath, rocky sites, woodland and herb and grass fields. Flowering occurs from November to March.
- Pimelea axiflora subsp. pubescens Rye, commonly known as Bungonia rice-flower, is a dioecious shrub to 3 m (9.8 ft) high, stems either smooth or hairy, new stem growth with hairs 1 mm (0.039 in) long. The petiole 3 mm (0.12 in) long, underside of leaves hairy, 0.5–6 cm (0.20–2.36 in) long and 2–10 mm (0.079–0.394 in) wide, linear to narrowly oval, margins curled under. The upper leaf surface usually smooth and secondary veins on underside obvious. The female flowers are 3–4 mm (0.12–0.16 in) long, male 5–9 mm (0.20–0.35 in) long, 2-10 white flowers in each cluster in leaf axils, 2-4 bracts 2–7 mm (0.079–0.276 in) long and stalk more or less absent. Fruit are green and about 3–4 mm (0.12–0.16 in) long. Flowering occurs in September. It is only found in the Bungonia National Park south east of Goulburn N.S.W where it grows on rocky, limestone outcrops and cliffs.

== Distribution ==
Bootlace bush is found at higher altitudes on the Grampians extending to the east coast in Victoria, in south-eastern New South Wales and on King Island, Tasmania.

== Conservation status ==
- Pimelea axiflora subsp. axiflora is listed as "endangered" under the Threatened Species Protection Act 1995, Tasmania.
- Pimelea axiflora subsp. alpina is considered rare in Victoria.
- Pimelea axiflora subsp. pubescens is listed as "endangered" under the Environment Protection and Biodiversity Conservation Act due to be known from a single population containing a low number of mature plants.
