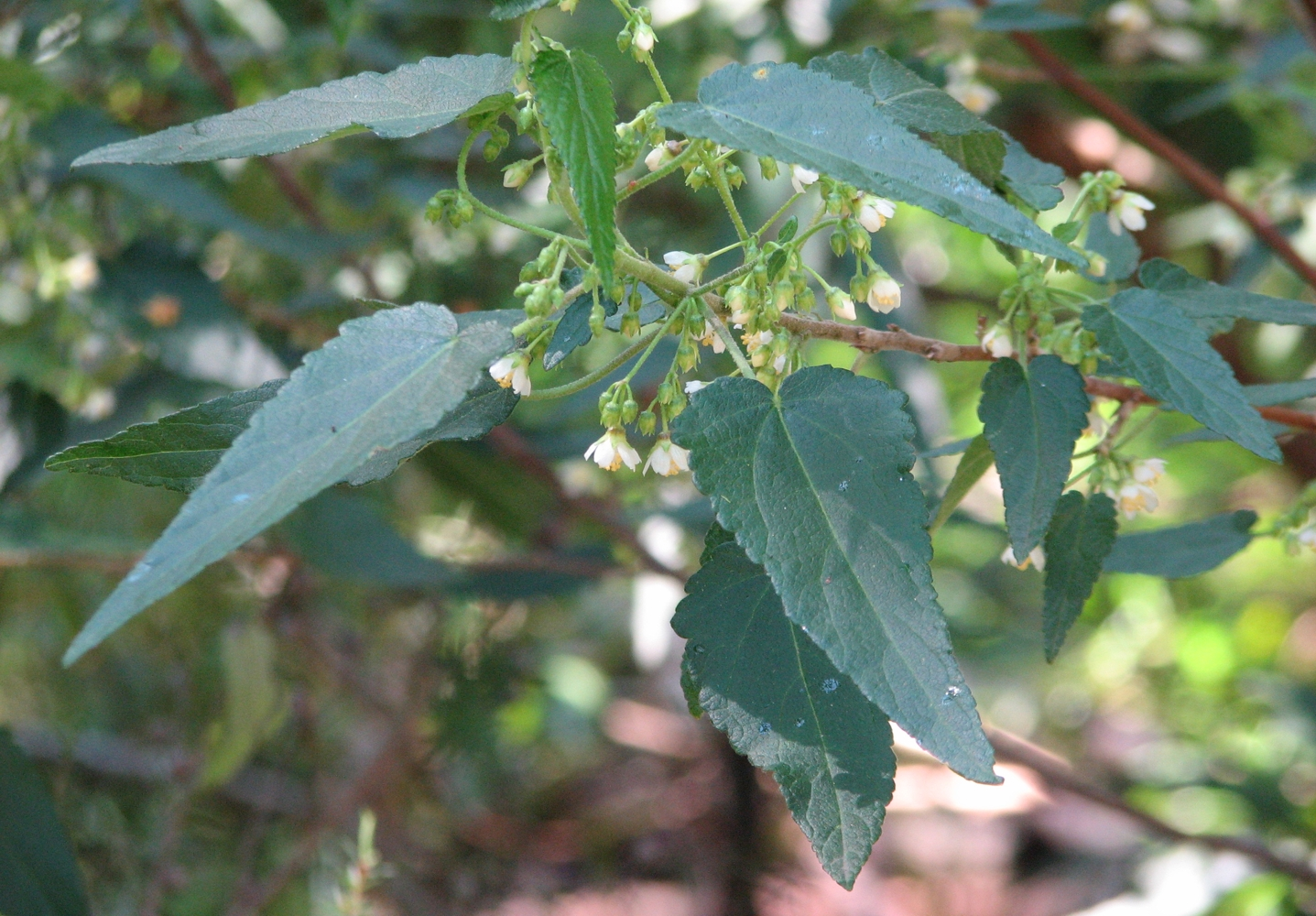
- Gynatrix pulchella at Mount Waverley, Victoria

Scientific classification
- Kingdom: Plantae
- Clade: Tracheophytes
- Clade: Angiosperms
- Clade: Eudicots
- Clade: Rosids
- Order: Malvales
- Family: Malvaceae
- Genus: Gynatrix
- Species: G. pulchella

Binomial name
- Gynatrix pulchella (Willd.) Alef.

Synonyms
- Abutilon pulchellum (Willd.) Sweet; Abutilon pulchrum (Bertero ex Colla) G.Don; Napaea pulchella (Willd.) Alef. Plagianthus pulchellus (Willd.) A.Gray; Plagianthus pulchellus var. tomentosus Rodway; Plagianthus tasmanicus (Hook.f.) Benth. Plagianthus tasmanicus A.Gray; Sida pulchella Willd. Sida pulchra Bertero ex Colla; Sida tasmanica Hook.f.

= Gynatrix pulchella =

Hemp bush

Species of plant endemic to Australia

Gynatrix pulchella, known commonly as the hemp bush or Aboriginal hemp, is a flowering shrub in the family Malvaceae that is endemic to southeast Australia

== Habitat & Distribution ==
The species occurs in warm to cool temperate sclerophyll and wet forests in New South Wales, the Australian Capital Territory, Victoria and Tasmania.

== Description ==
It can grow as a shrub or tree to a height of 5 metres, although it has a mean height of 3 metres. Plants of this species have a bushy, erect or spreading growth habit and reach reproductive maturity in 1 to 5 years. The species has a perennial life cycle and is alternatively considered to be monoecious, dioecious and hermaphroditic. Its white cream or yellow orange flowers bloom from August to January. The species features dry and dehiscent capsule or mericarp fruit. The seeds have a reniform shape. The leaves have toothed crenate margins with a lanceolate, narrowly ovate or ovate leaf shape - they have a length of 150 mm and a width of 50mm.
