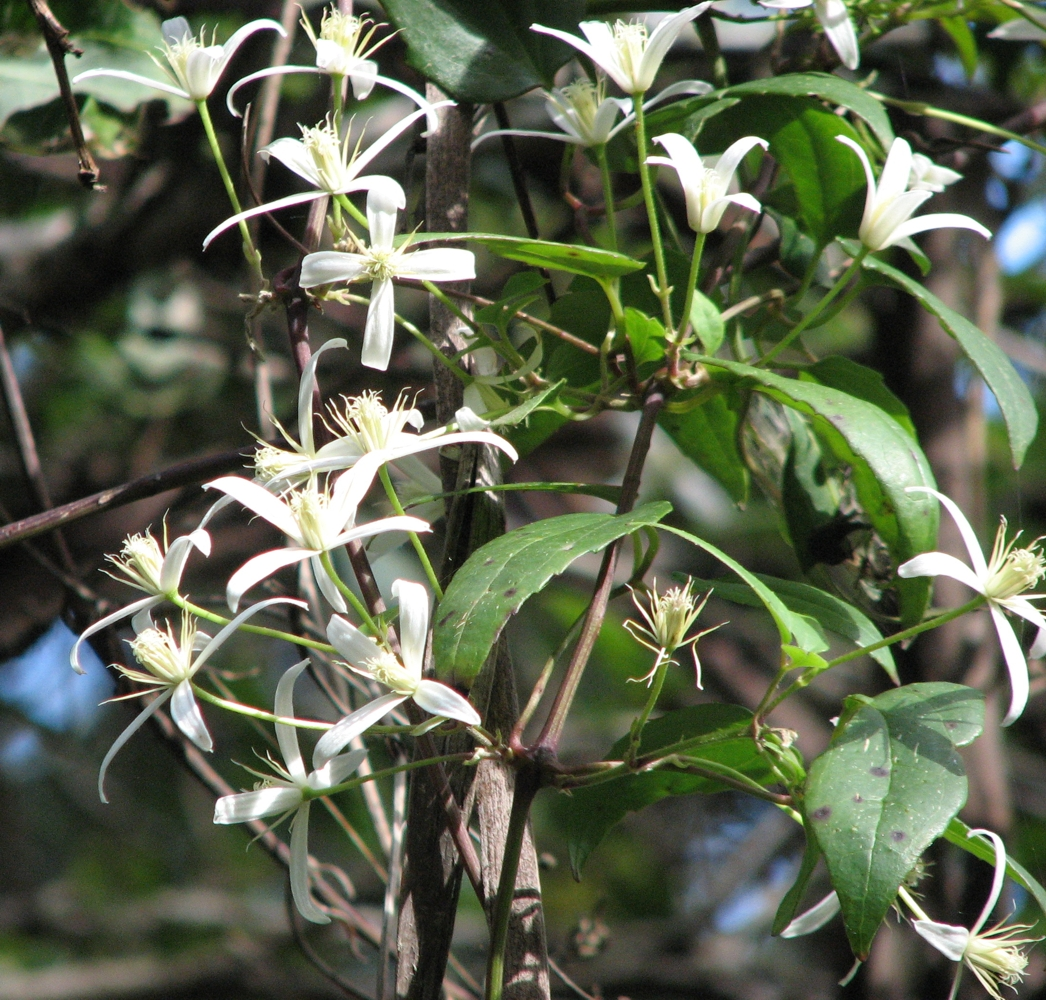

Scientific classification
- Kingdom: Plantae
- Clade: Tracheophytes
- Clade: Angiosperms
- Clade: Eudicots
- Order: Ranunculales
- Family: Ranunculaceae
- Genus: Clematis
- Species: C. aristata

Binomial name
- Clematis aristata R.Br. ex Ker Gawl.

= Clematis aristata =

Australian clematis

Species of flowering plant in the buttercup family

Clematis aristata, known as Australian clematis, wild clematis, goat's beard or old man's beard, is a climbing shrub of the family Ranunculaceae, found in eastern Australia in dry and wet forests of Queensland, New South Wales, Victoria and Tasmania. In spring to early summer it produces mass displays of attractive star-shaped flowers usually borne in short panicles with each flower up to 70 mm diameter and possessing four narrow white or cream tepals. Fertile male and female reproductive structures occur in flowers of separate plants (dioecy) making this species an obligate outcrosser with pollen movement among plants most likely facilitated by insects. Each seed head (or infructescence) on female plants consists of multiple achenes (an aeterio) with each seed bearing a plumose awn 2–4.5 cm long promoting dispersal by wind.

The mature leaves are most commonly ternate with leaflets up to 80 mm long and petioles that are able to twine around objects to provide climbing support. Juvenile leaves are simple, usually purplish-tinged with whitish streaks along the main veins.

Several varieties have been previously described but are now not formally recognised. These included:

var. blanda - with small flowers and twice-divided leaflets which is found from Victoria to Tasmania
var. dennisae - with red filaments in the flowers and found in eastern Victoria
var. longiseta - with yellowish hairy flowers found in Queensland

Cytological analysis has shown C. aristata to be diploid with a somatic chromosome number of 2n=16. These consist of five pairs of metacentric, one pair of subtelocentric, and two pairs of telocentric chromosomes with distal heterochromatic satellites.

== Cultivation ==
Clematis aristata is a popular hardy garden plant. It prefers a semi-shaded or shaded position and cool deep soils and will withstand heavy pruning. It is a vigorous climber and may become a problem by smothering other plants.

Propagation can be carried out from fresh seed and from cuttings of semi-hardened stems.
