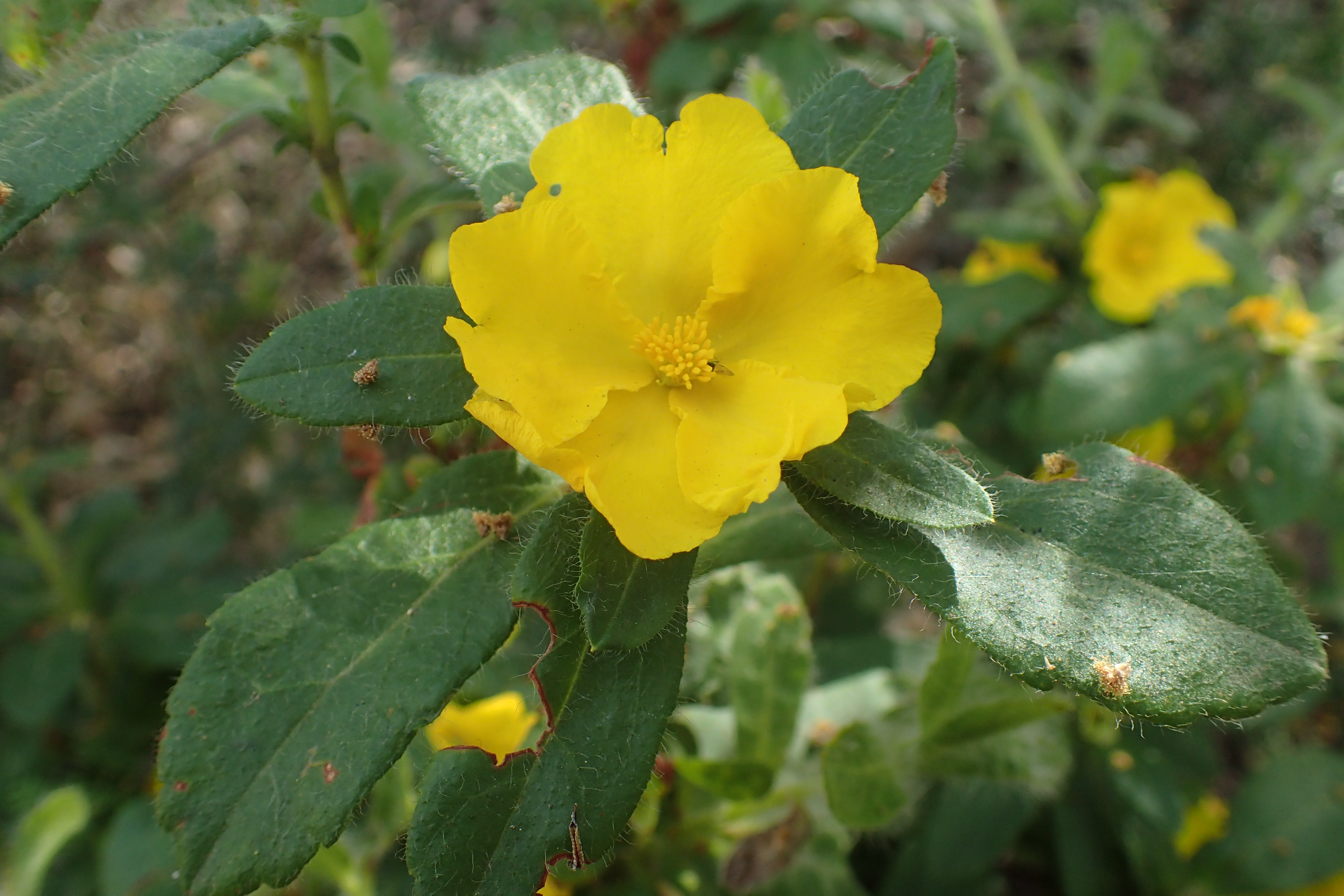

Scientific classification
- Kingdom: Plantae
- Clade: Tracheophytes
- Clade: Angiosperms
- Clade: Eudicots
- Order: Dilleniales
- Family: Dilleniaceae
- Genus: Hibbertia
- Species: H. pilosa

Binomial name
- Hibbertia pilosa Steud.

= Hibbertia pilosa =

Species of flowering plant

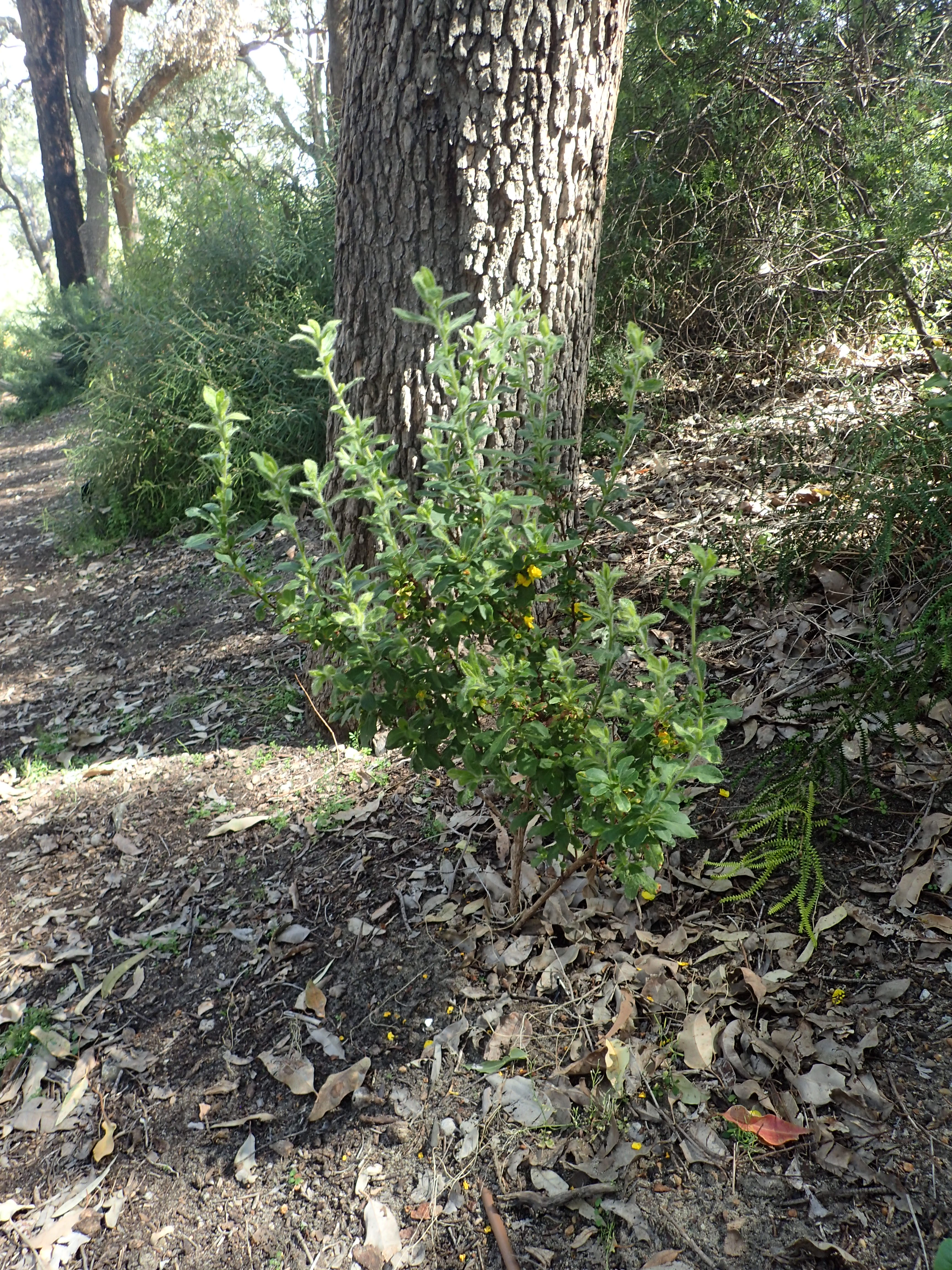
Habit in Kings Park, Perth

Hibbertia pilosa, commonly known as hairy guinea flower, is a species of flowering plant in the family Dilleniaceae and is endemic to the southwest of Western Australia. It is an erect or sprawling shrub that typically grows to a height of 0.3–1.5 m (1 ft 0 in – 4 ft 11 in) and has leaves with long, soft hairs. The flowers are yellow with one or two densely hairy carpels from September to December. The species was first formally described in 1845 by Ernst Gottlieb von Steudel in Lehmann's Plantae Preissianae. The specific epithet (pilosa) means "pilose", referring to the leaves.

Hairy guinea flower grows on rocky slope, granite outcrops and hills in the Jarrah Forest and Swan Coastal Plain and Warren bioregions of south-western Western Australia.

== See also ==
- List of Hibbertia species
