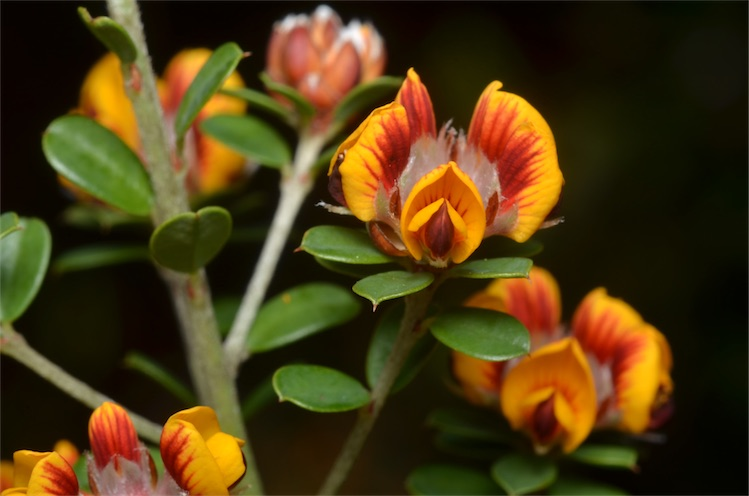

Scientific classification
- Kingdom: Plantae
- Clade: Tracheophytes
- Clade: Angiosperms
- Clade: Eudicots
- Clade: Rosids
- Order: Fabales
- Family: Fabaceae
- Subfamily: Faboideae
- Genus: Pultenaea
- Species: P. stricta

Binomial name
- Pultenaea stricta Sims

Synonyms
- Pultenaea stricta var. incurvata Ewart; Pultenaea stricta Sims var. stricta

= Pultenaea stricta =

Rigid bush-pea

Species of plant

Pultenaea stricta, commonly known as rigid bush-pea, is a species of flowering plant in the family Fabaceae and is endemic to south-eastern continental Australia. It is a slender, erect or low-lying shrub with elliptic to egg-shaped leaves with the narrower end towards the base, and yellow and red, pea-like flowers.

== Description ==
Pultenaea stricta is a slender, erect or low-lying shrub that typically grows to a height of up to 1 m (3 ft 3 in) and has ribbed stems covered with hairs flattened against the surface. The leaves are arranged alternately along the branches, elliptic to egg-shaped with the narrower end towards the base, 4–15 mm (0.16–0.59 in) long, 2–8.6 mm (0.079–0.339 in) wide with lance-shaped, dark brown stipules 1.0–1.2 mm (0.039–0.047 in) long at the base. The flowers are arranged in clusters of more than three on the ends of branches and are 8–10 mm (0.31–0.39 in) long with egg-shaped bracts 2–4 mm (0.079–0.157 in) long at the base, but that fall off as the flower opens. The sepals are 4–5 mm (0.16–0.20 in) long with lance-shaped bracteoles 3–4 mm (0.12–0.16 in) long attached to the side of the sepal tube. The standard petal is yellow to orange with red streaks and 8–9 mm (0.31–0.35 in) long, the wings yellow and 7.8–9.0 mm (0.31–0.35 in) long, and the keel crimson and 7.2–9.0 mm (0.28–0.35 in) long. Flowering mainly occurs from September to November and the fruit is a flattened egg-shaped pod 5–6 mm (0.20–0.24 in) long.

== Taxonomy ==
Rigid bush-pea was first formally described in 1813 by John Sims in The Botanical Magazine. The specific epithet (stricta) means "erect" or "rigid".

== Distribution and habitat ==
Pultenaea stricta usually grows in wet sites in forest and heathland. It is found south of the Great Dividing Range in southern Victoria, in the far south-east of South Australia and in Tasmania.
