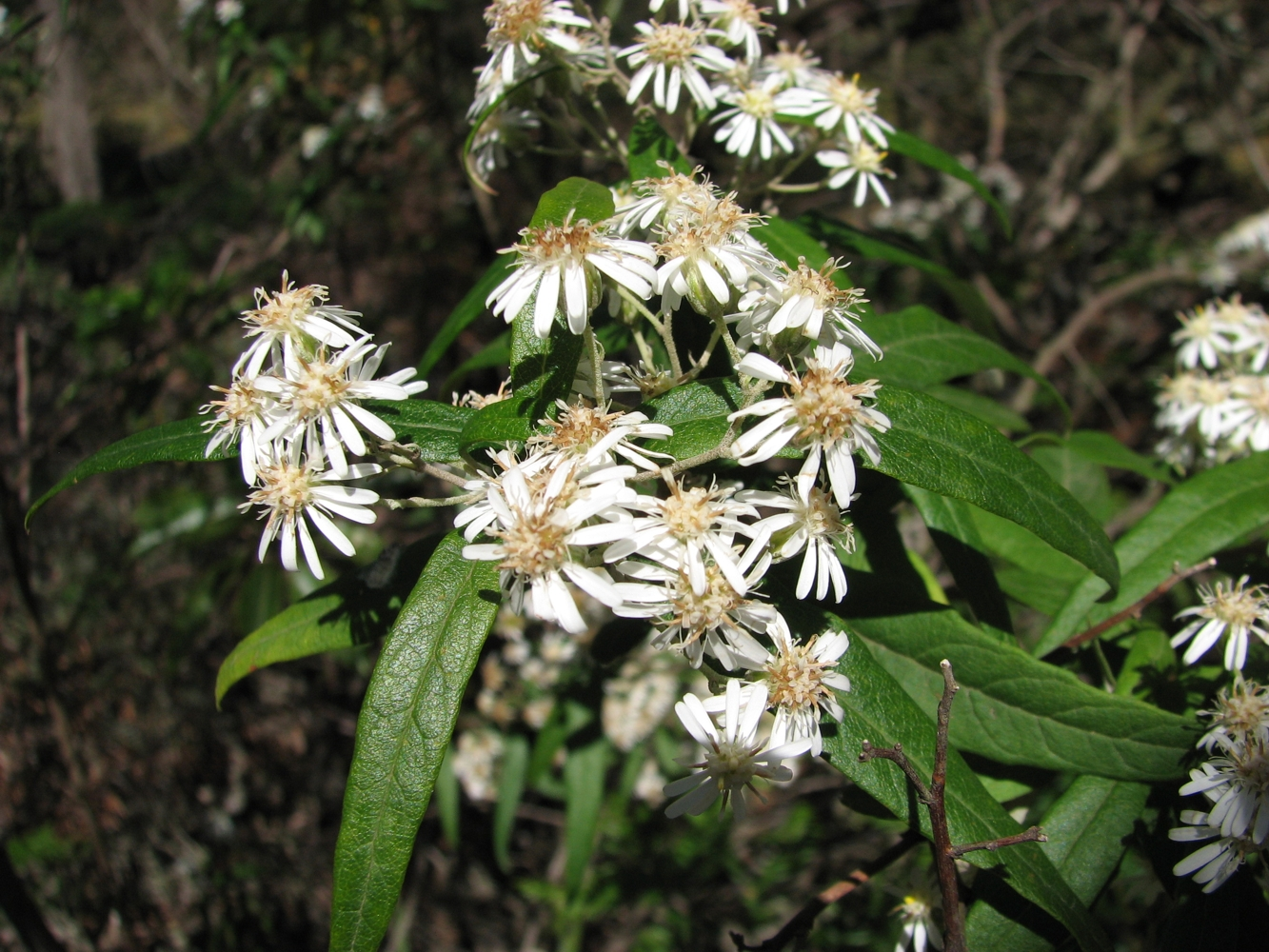
- In the Langwarrin Flora and Fauna reserve

Scientific classification
- Kingdom: Plantae
- Clade: Tracheophytes
- Clade: Angiosperms
- Clade: Eudicots
- Clade: Asterids
- Order: Asterales
- Family: Asteraceae
- Genus: Olearia
- Species: O. lirata

Binomial name
- Olearia lirata (Sims) Hutch.

Synonyms
- List: Aster liratus Sims; Aster lyratus Nees nom. inval., pro syn.; Diplostephium liratum (Sims) Nees; Diplostephium lyratum Nees orth. var.; Eurybia lirata (Sims) DC.; Olearia affinis Hook.f.; Olearia lyratus Hutch. orth. var.; Olearia stellulata f. lirata (Sims) Siebert & Voss; Olearia stellulata f. lyrata Siebert & Voss orth. var.; Olearia stellulata var. lirata (Sims) Benth.; Shawia lirata (Sims) Sch.Bip.; Shawia lyrata Sch.Bip. orth. var.; Olearia stellulata auct. non (Labill.) DC.: Lander, N.S. in Harden, G.J. (ed.) (1992)

= Olearia lirata =

Species of flowering plant

Olearia lirata, commonly known as snowy daisy-bush, is a species of flowering plant in the family Asteraceae and is endemic to south-eastern Australia. It is a shrub with lance-shaped leaves and white and cream-coloured to yellow, daisy-like inflorescences.

== Description ==
Olearia lirata is a shrub that typically grows to a height of up to 4 m (13 ft) and has greyish branchlets. Its leaves are arranged alternately along the branchlets, lance-shaped, 30–150 mm (1.2–5.9 in) long, 5–25 mm (0.20–0.98 in) wide and petiolate, the edges of the leaves sometimes wavy or toothed. The heads or daisy-like "flowers" are arranged in loose groups on the ends of branches on a peduncle 5–12 mm (0.20–0.47 in) long and are 12–25 mm (0.47–0.98 in) in diameter. Each head has three to four rows of bracts forming a hemispherical involucre 3.5–4.5 mm (0.14–0.18 in) long and ten to sixteen white ray florets, the ligule 4–8 mm (0.16–0.31 in) long, surrounding nine to fourteen cream-coloured to yellow disc florets. Flowering occurs from August to January and the fruit is a ribbed achene 1.5–2.0 mm (0.059–0.079 in) long, the pappus 3.5–4.5 mm (0.14–0.18 in) long.

== Taxonomy ==
This species was first formally described in 1812 by John Sims who gave it the name Aster liratus in The Botanical Magazine from specimens grown in "Knight's exotic nursery". In 1917, John Hutchinson changed the name to Olearia lirata in The Gardeners' Chronicle. The specific epithet (lirata) means "possessing furrows".

== Distribution and habitat ==
Olearia lirata grows in moist forest and scrub on the coast and tablelands of New South Wales and the Australian Capital Territory, in eastern Victoria to as far west as the Otway Range, and is widespread and common in Tasmania.
