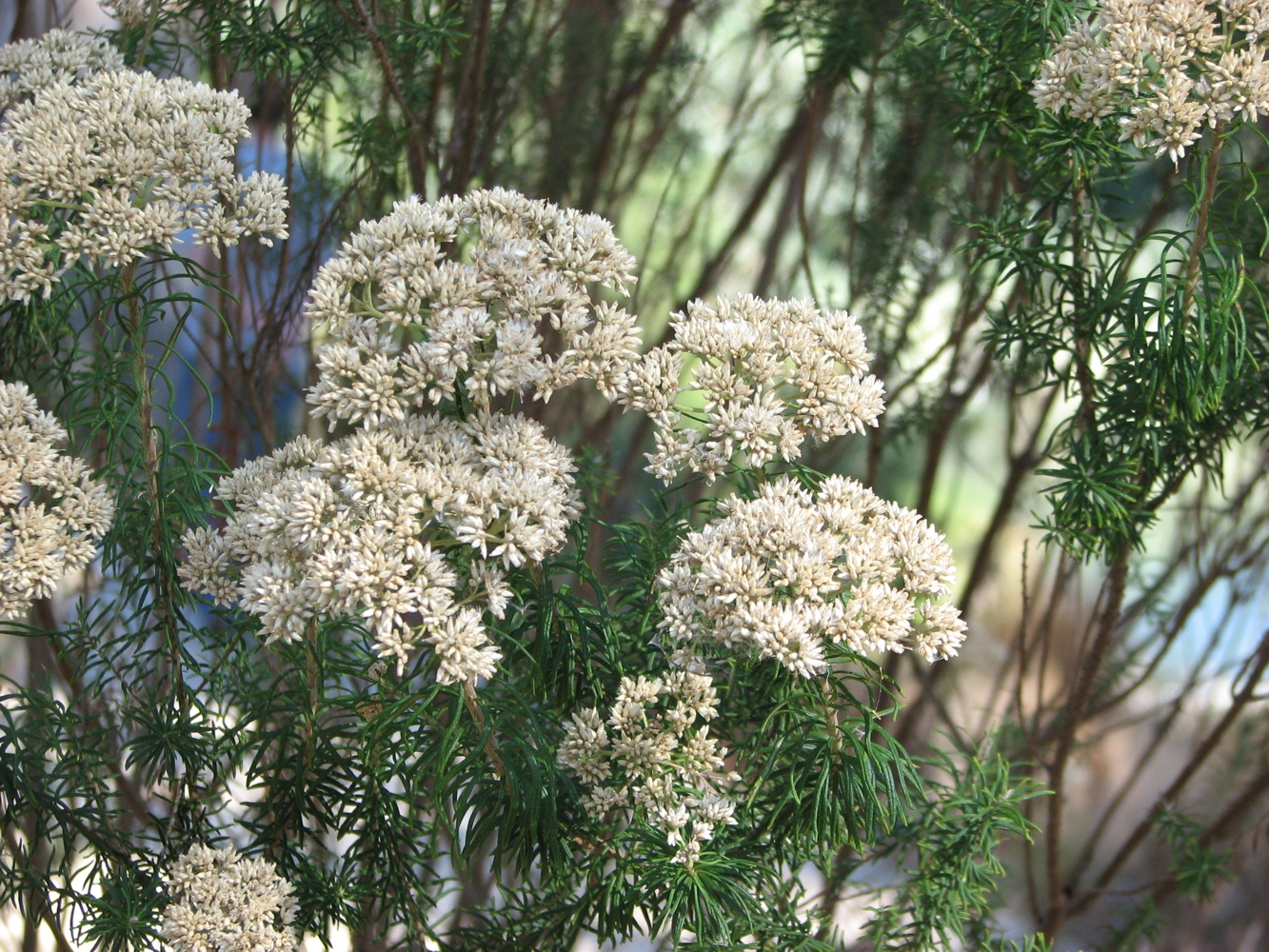

Scientific classification
- Kingdom: Plantae
- Clade: Tracheophytes
- Clade: Angiosperms
- Clade: Eudicots
- Clade: Asterids
- Order: Asterales
- Family: Asteraceae
- Genus: Cassinia
- Species: C. aculeata

Binomial name
- Cassinia aculeata (Labill.) R.Br.

Synonyms
- Calea aculeata Labill.; Cassinia aculeata (Labill.) R.Br. var. aculeata; Cassinia affinis R.Br.; Chromochiton aculeata B.D.Jacks. nom. inval., pro syn.; Chromochiton affinis B.D.Jacks. nom. inval., pro syn.; Elichrysum pseudoferrugineum Hochr. orth. var.; Helichrysum pseudoferrugineum Hochr.

= Cassinia aculeata =

Species of plant

Cassinia aculeata, commonly known as common cassinia, dolly bush or dogwood, is a species of flowering plant in the family Asteraceae and is endemic to south-eastern Australia. It is an erect shrub with sessile, linear, variably-sized leaves, and heads of creamy-white to white flowers arranged in rounded cymes.

== Description ==
Cassinia aculeata is an erect shrub that typically grows to a height of 1–2.6 m (3 ft 3 in – 8 ft 6 in) and has densely hairy young stems, and flaky bark on the older branches. The leaves are sessile, linear, 3–50 mm (0.12–1.97 in) long and 0.7–2.0 mm (0.028–0.079 in) wide, often with the edges rolled under. The flower heads are creamy-white to white, 4–5 mm (0.16–0.20 in) long, arranged in rounded cymes of 30 to 200, 20–130 mm (0.79–5.12 in) in diameter. Flowering occurs from November to February and the achene is cylindrical, 0.8–1.0 mm (0.031–0.039 in) long with a pappus of barbed bristles 2.5–3.5 mm (0.098–0.138 in) long.

== Taxonomy ==
Dolly bush was first formally described in 1806 by Jacques Labillardière who gave it the name Calea aculeata in his book Novae Hollandiae Plantarum Specimen. In 1818, Robert Brown changed the name to Cassinia aculeata in the Transactions of the Linnean Society of London. The specific epithet (aculeata) means "prickly".

In 2009, Anthony Edward Orchard described two subspecies in Australian Systematic Botany and the names are accepted by the Australian Plant Census:

- Cassinia aculeata (Labill.) R.Br. subsp. aculeata has three or four florets in each head.
- Cassinia aculeata subsp. nova-anglica Orchard has five or six, rarely seven florets in each head.

== Distribution and habitat ==
Cassinia aculeata grows in a wide variety of habitats from sea level to 1,300 m (4,300 ft) above sea level, but often in disturbed areas, as for example after fire or logging operations. It is found in New South Wales, the Australian Capital Territory, Victoria and Tasmania. Subspecies nova-anglica grows at higher altitudes and is only known from the New England National Park and a single collection on the Central Tablelands.

== Use in horticulture ==
The species is fast growing and requires heavy, moist, well-drained soils, in partial sun. It does not tolerate salt winds. Dogwood can provide a quick screen while other plants grow. It is not usually long-lived. Cassinias need pruning to maintain shape. The flowers are long-lasting and can also be dried. The foliage may cause skin irritations.
