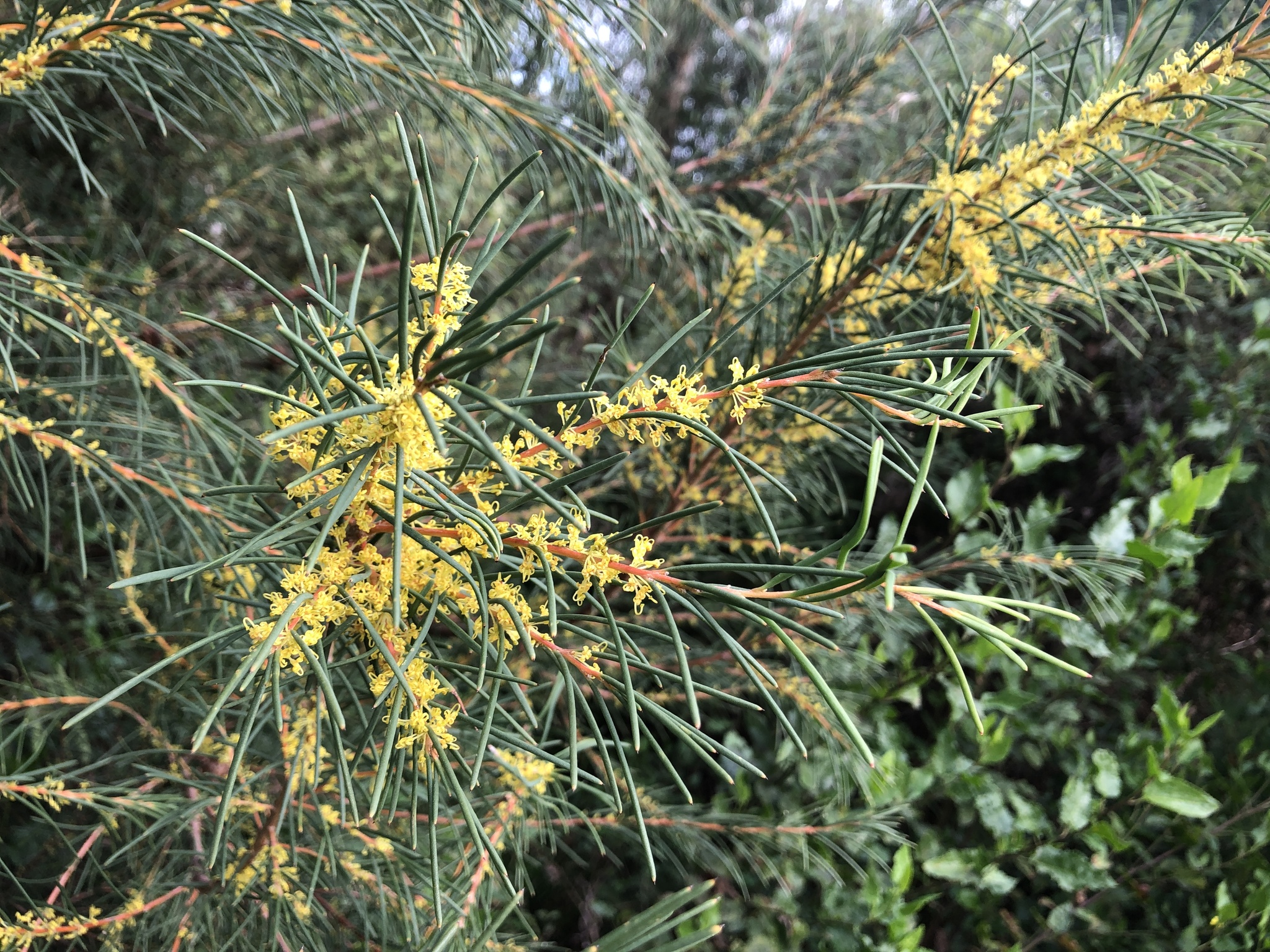

Scientific classification
- Kingdom: Plantae
- Clade: Tracheophytes
- Clade: Angiosperms
- Clade: Eudicots
- Order: Proteales
- Family: Proteaceae
- Genus: Hakea
- Species: H. nodosa

Binomial name
- Hakea nodosa R.Br.
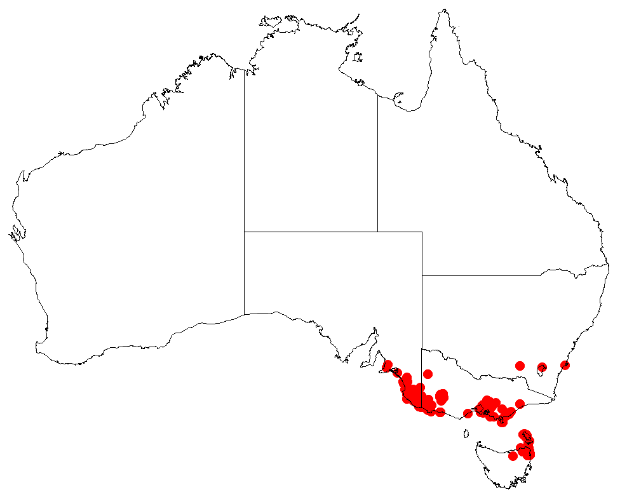
- Occurrence data from AVH

= Hakea nodosa =

Yellow hakea

Species of shrub endemic to Australia

Hakea nodosa, commonly known as yellow hakea, is a shrub that is endemic to Australia. It usually has golden yellow flowers in profusion and needle-shaped leaves.

== Description ==
Hakea nodosa is an erect, sprawling shrub usually growing to 3 m (9.8 ft) tall and a similar width. The branchlets quickly form ribbing or slowly becoming smooth. The leaves are usually needle-shaped, sometimes flattened, flexible, 0.8–5 cm (0.31–1.97 in) long and 0.7–2.5 mm (0.028–0.098 in) wide. The leaves are occasionally grooved below and smooth ending in a point 0.2–0.9 mm (0.0079–0.0354 in) long. The inflorescence consists of 2-11 cream-white to golden yellow flowers in profusion, clustered along the branches. The inflorescence is on a simple stem densely covered with upright hairs, they may be white, brown or a combination of both. The pedicels are 1.5–1 mm (0.059–0.039 in) long with white, soft, silky hairs. The pistil 3–4.5 mm (0.12–0.18 in) long, the perianth is smooth and 1.3–2.2 mm (0.051–0.087 in) long. These are followed by woody seed capsules that are 30 to 35 mm long. Two contrasting types of the latter are produced, one that is woody with contrasting lighter bumps, and the other that is smooth, not woody and opens while still attached to the branch. Flowering occurs from May to August.

== Taxonomy and naming ==
Hakea nodosa was first formally described by botanist Robert Brown in 1810 and the description was published in Transactions of the Linnean Society of London. The specific epithet is derived from the Latin word nodosus meaning "knotty", referring to the prominent knobs on the fruit.

== Distribution and habitat ==
Yellow hakea occurs in south-eastern South Australia, Victoria and north-eastern Tasmania in dense heath woodlands, usually in winter wet locations on clay soil.

== Cultivation ==
Yellow hakea is adaptable to a wide range of soils and climatic conditions and will grow well in full sun or part shade.
