= Healesville Freeway =

Proposed freeway in Melbourne

Healesville Freeway Victoria

General information
- Type: Freeway (Proposed)
- Length: 18 km (11 mi)

Major junctions
- West end: EastLink; Forest Hill, Melbourne
- Wantirna Road; Canterbury Road
- East end: Mooroolbark Road; Lilydale, Melbourne

Location(s)
- Major suburbs / towns: Vermont, Wantirna, Bayswater North, Kilsyth, Mooroolbark, Lilydale

Highway system
- Highways in Australia; National Highway • Freeways in Australia; Highways in Victoria

Healesville Freeway was a proposed freeway in the eastern suburbs of Melbourne, Australia. It was initially proposed in 1969, to run between Riversdale Road in Box Hill South, intersecting Springvale Road and then to Maroondah Highway in Coldstream.

In 2011, VicRoads deemed the freeway reservation between Springvale Road in Forest Hill and Boronia Road in Vermont to no longer be necessary for road building purposes, and this section was reviewed for future non-road uses.

In 2018, the section between Springvale Road and Boronia Road was gradually released back to the Crown to become parkland, including bicycle and pedestrian paths.

The land reserved for the Healesville freeway between Boronia Road/Eastlink towards Maroondah Highway in Mooroolbark was further considered to be incorporated – in part – into the Corridor D option of the North East Link (freeway) Project in 2017–2018.

Smaller sections of the original freeway route reservation, at both ends of the route, have subsequently been released for other uses since 1979. The remainder of the land remains reserved for use by VicRoads.

== Planned route ==
LGA	Location	km	mi	Destinations	Notes
Maroondah	Wantirna	0	0.0	EastLink (M3) – Ringwood, Frankston	Part of the currently-active reservation and open for future use by VicRoads, potential for construction in future
Maroondah	Wantirna	0.8	0.50	Wantirna Road (Metro Route 9) – Ringwood, Wantirna	Outbound entry and inbound exit only. Part of the currently-active reservation and open for future use by VicRoads, potential for construction in future
Maroondah	Bayswater	2.9	1.8	Stud Road – Wantirna South	Connection to (then-proposed, now-cancelled) extension to Stud Road past Mountain Highway. Part of the currently-active reservation and open for future use by VicRoads, potential for construction in future
Maroondah	Bayswater North	4.4	2.7	Canterbury Road (Metro Route 32) – Vermont, Montrose	Part of the currently-active reservation and open for future use by VicRoads, potential for construction in future
Maroondah	Bayswater North	7	4.3	Dorset Road (Metro Route 5) – Boronia, Croydon	Part of the currently-active reservation and open for future use by VicRoads, potential for construction in future
Yarra Ranges	Mooroolbark–Kilsyth border	11.2	7.0	Cambridge Road – Mooroolbark, Montrose	Part of the currently-active reservation and open for future use by VicRoads, potential for construction in future
Yarra Ranges	Mooroolbark	13.8	8.6	Mooroolbark Road – Lilydale; Hull Road – Mooroolbark, Mount Evelyn	Eastern terminus of route. Part of the currently-active reservation and open for future use by VicRoads, potential for construction in future
1.000 mi = 1.609 km; 1.000 km = 0.621 mi: Unopened

== Cancelled route ==
LGA	Location	km	mi	Destinations	Notes
Stonnington	Glen Iris	0.0	0.0	Monash Freeway (M1)	Western terminus of route. Start of the planned F9 East Route, cancelled in 1973
Boroondara	Glen Iris	0.9	0.56	Glen Iris Road	Outbound entry and inbound exit only. Part of the original planned corridor, cancelled in 1973
Boroondara–Monash Border	Glen Iris–Burwood Border	3.3	2.1	Warrigal Road (Metro Route 15) – Oakleigh, Burwood	Part of the original planned corridor, cancelled in 1973
Whitehorse	Burwood	5.2	3.2	Burwood Highway (Metro Route 26) – Burwood, Ferntree Gully	Part of the original planned corridor, cancelled in 1973
Whitehorse	Box Hill South	7.3	4.5	Riversdale Road (Metro Route 20) – Camberwell	Part of the first revision of the F9 East Corridor, cancelled in 1984
Whitehorse	Box Hill South	7.7	4.8	Middleborough Road (Metro Route 23) – Doncaster, Mount Waverley	Inbound entry and outbound exit only. Part of the first revision of the corridor, cancelled in 1984
Whitehorse	Blackburn South	8.6	5.3	F7 Warrigal Freeway (Freeway Route F7) – Diamond Creek, Clarinda	Part of the original corridor, cancelled in 1973
Whitehorse	Blackburn South	9.5	5.9	Blackburn Road (Metro Route 13) – Clayton, Blackburn	Outbound entry and inbound exit only. Part of the first revision of the corridor, cancelled in 1984
Whitehorse	Forest Hill	10.9	6.8	Springvale Road (Metro Route 40) – Nunawading, Glen Waverley	Part of the final revision of the F9 East corridor, cancelled early-to-mid 1990s
Whitehorse	Vermont	14	8.7	Boronia Road (Metro Route 36) – Vermont, Boronia	Outbound exit only, cancelled 1984
1.000 mi = 1.609 km; 1.000 km = 0.621 mi: Closed/former

Starting at the intersection of EastLink with a full freeway junction, it will then head north east, finally joining Mooroolbark Road and terminating at Maroondah Highway at the border of Mooroolbark and Lilydale, linking up with the proposed Lilydale Bypass.

The freeway was originally designated in the 1969 Melbourne Transportation Plan as part of the F9 Freeway corridor, extending past Springvale Road, joining Riversdale Road and winding through Glen Iris to join the M1 Monash Freeway at Burke Road.
