= Mountain Highway =

Highway in Victoria, Australia

Mountain Highway Wantirna–Sassafras Road Victoria
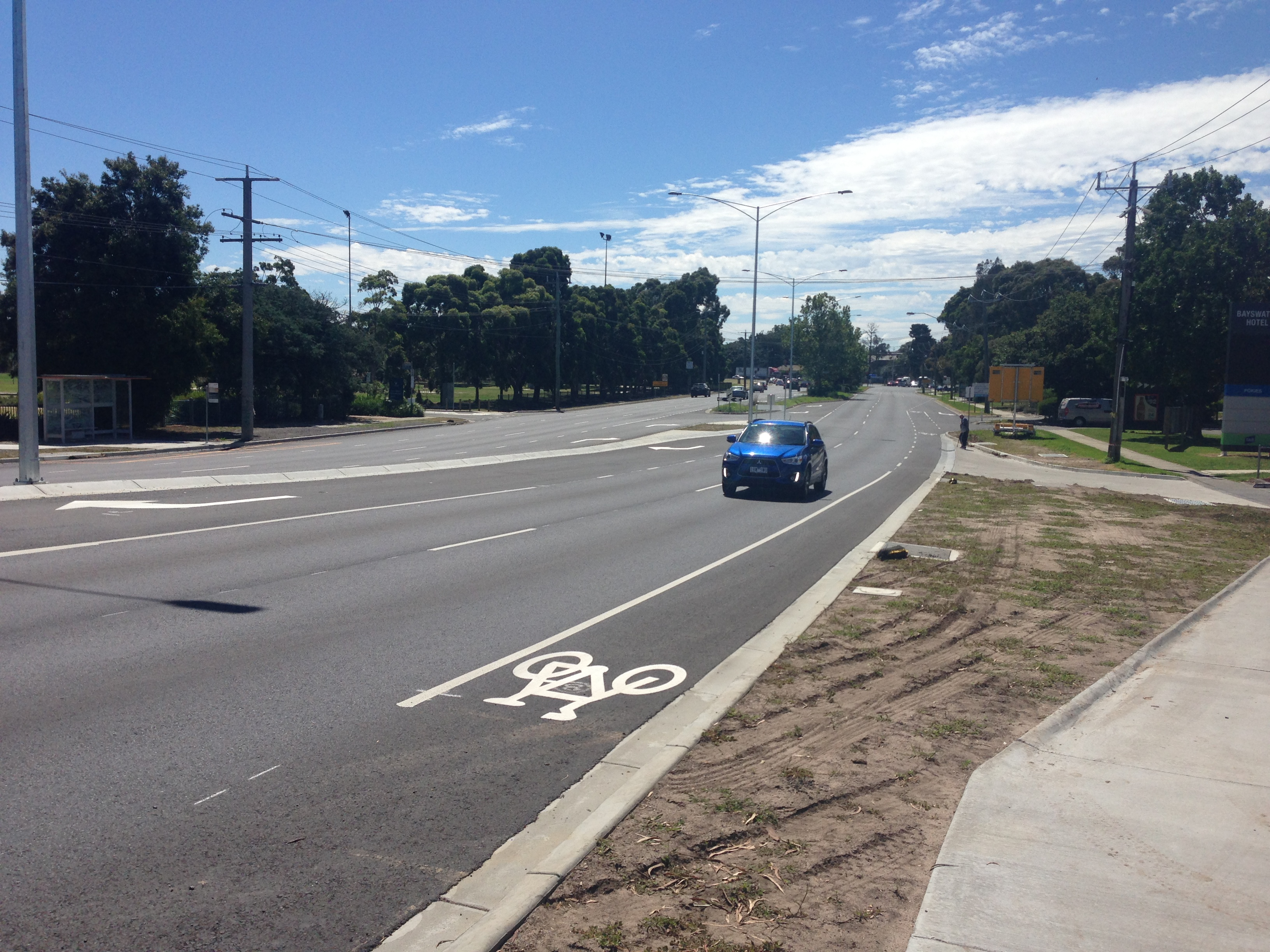
- Looking east along Mountain Highway, just east of the Belgrave line bridge, Bayswater
- Coordinates: 37.859847°S 145.207075°E (West end); 37.862833°S 145.353709°E (East end)

General information
- Type: Highway
- Length: 18 km (11 mi)
- Route number(s): Metro Route 28 (1965–present)

Major junctions
- West end: Burwood Highway; Wantirna, Melbourne
- Boronia Road; Bayswater Road; Scoresby Road; Dorset Road; Forest Road
- East end: Mount Dandenong Tourist Road; Sassafras, Melbourne

Location(s)
- LGA(s): City of Knox; Shire of Yarra Ranges
- Major settlements: Wantirna, Bayswater, The Basin

Highway system
- Highways in Australia; National Highway • Freeways in Australia; Highways in Victoria

Mountain Highway (also known as Wantirna–Sassafras Road) is an 18 km west–east highway located in the eastern suburbs of Melbourne, linking the outer fringes of the city to the Dandenong Ranges.

== Route ==
Mountain Highway starts at the intersection with Burwood Highway in western Wantirna, heading north-east as a four-lane, dual-carriageway highway under Eastlink until reaching Wantirna Road in Wantirna, where it widens to a six-lane, dual-carriageway highway, and continues east through Bayswater, over the Belgrave railway line until the intersection with Scoresby and Bayswater Roads, where it narrows back to a four-lane, dual-carriageway highway, continuing east until Dorset Road, where it narrows further to a dual-lane, single-carriageway road. It continues south-east through Boronia to The Basin, then uphill through the Dandenong Ranges National Park (between Forest Road and Mount Dandenong Tourist Road) where sections are steep and windy, with an approximate 1 in 20 (5%) grade, especially popular with motorcyclists and cyclists, and is busiest on the weekends. The climb is winding, and the road narrow, so care must be taken when travelling the road. The road ends at the intersection with Mount Dandenong Tourist Road in Sassafras, Victoria.

Speed limits range from 80 km/h from Burwood Highway through to Bayswater, with the limit dropping to 60 km/h between Bayswater town centre and Sassafras. The previous 70 km/h speed limit was removed in 2014 as part of the VicRoads initiative to eliminate 70 km/h and 90 km/h zones, and the drop in speed limit is presumed to be attributable to the presence of cyclists and lack of road shoulder or bicycle lane. In The Basin, a 60 km/h limit applies through the residential area east of Forest Road and a 50 km/h limit applies within the centre of the town. The approach to Mount Dandenong Tourist Road in Sassafras is also 60 km/h.

== History ==
Mountain Highway was signed as Metropolitan Route 28 between Wantirna and Sassafras in 1965.

The passing of the Road Management Act 2004 granted the responsibility of overall management and development of Victoria's major arterial roads to VicRoads: in 2004, VicRoads declared Wantirna–Sassafras Road (Arterial #5783) from Burwood Highway in Wantirna to Mount Dandenong Tourist Road in Sassafras. The road is still presently known (and signposted) as Mountain Highway along its entire length.

== Major Intersections ==
LGA	Location	km	mi	Destinations	Notes
Knox	Wantirna–Wantirna South boundary	0	0.0	Burwood Highway (Metro Route 26) – Burwood, Ferntree Gully	Western terminus of highway & Metro Route 28
Knox	Wantirna	2.2	1.4	Wantirna Road – Ringwood	Only left turn from Mountain Highway eastbound to Wantirna Road northbound
Knox	Wantirna	2.4	1.5	Boronia Road (Metro Routes 9/36) – Boronia, Vermont, Ringwood	No left turn from Mountain Highway eastbound to Boronia Road westbound No right turn from Boronia Road eastbound to Mountain Highway westbound
Knox	Wantirna–Bayswater boundary	4.2	2.6	Stud Road – Wantirna South, Rowville, Dandenong	
Knox	Bayswater	6.3	3.9	Scoresby Road (Metro Route 7 south) – Knoxfield; Bayswater Road (Metro Route 7 north) – Croydon	
Knox	Bayswater–Boronia boundary	6.3	3.9	Dorset Road (Metro Route 5) – Croydon North, Boronia, Ferntree Gully	
Knox	The Basin	11	6.8	Forest Road (Metro Route 36 southwest) – Boronia, Wantirna; Basin–Olinda Road (east) – Olinda	
Yarra Ranges	Sassafras	18	11	Mount Dandenong Tourist Road (C415) – Boronia, Wantirna	Eastern terminus of highway & Metro Route 28
1.000 mi = 1.609 km; 1.000 km = 0.621 mi: Incomplete access; Route transition

== Gallery ==
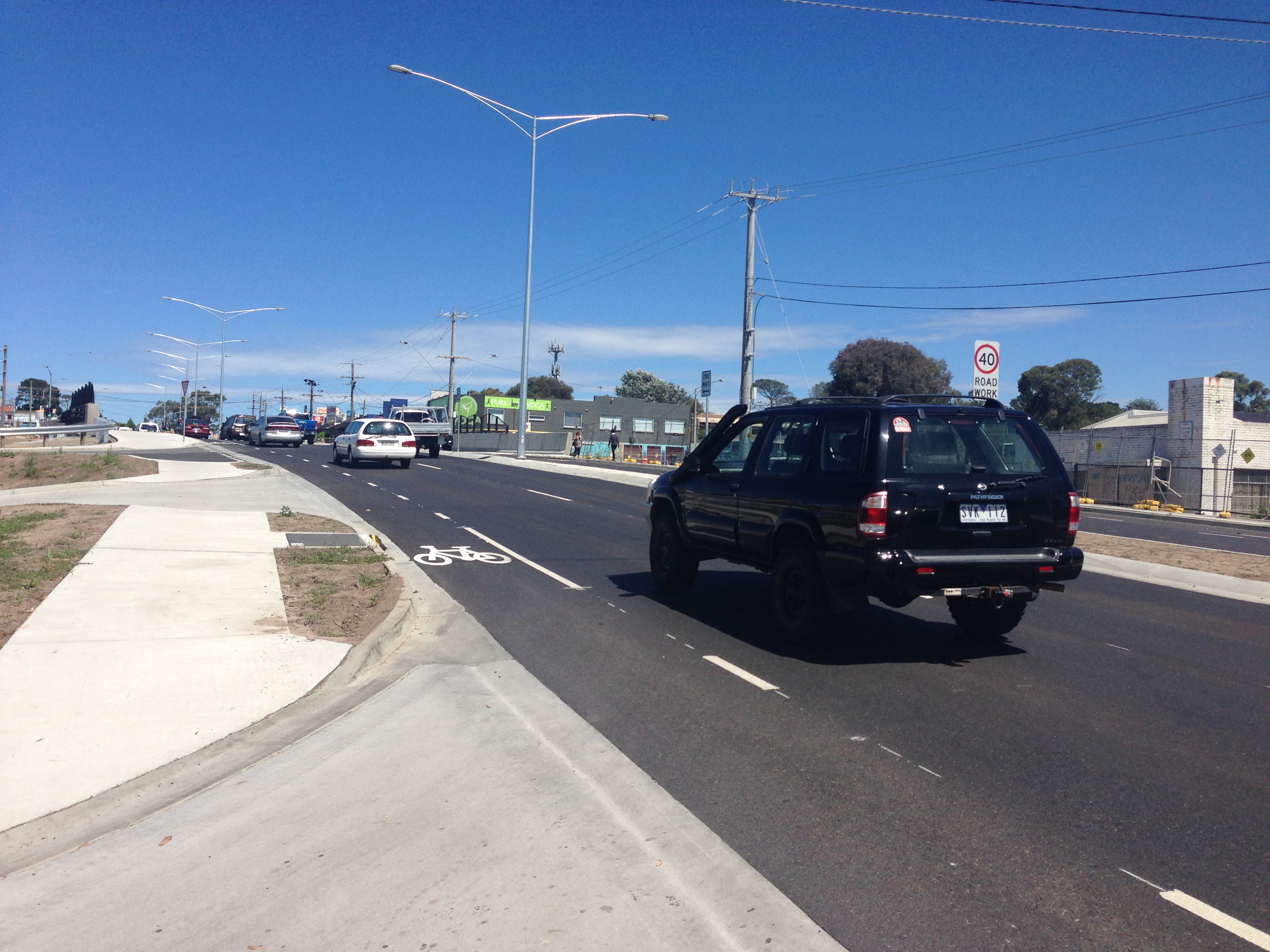
