= Burwood Highway =

Highway in Victoria, Australia

Burwood Highway Toorak Road Victoria
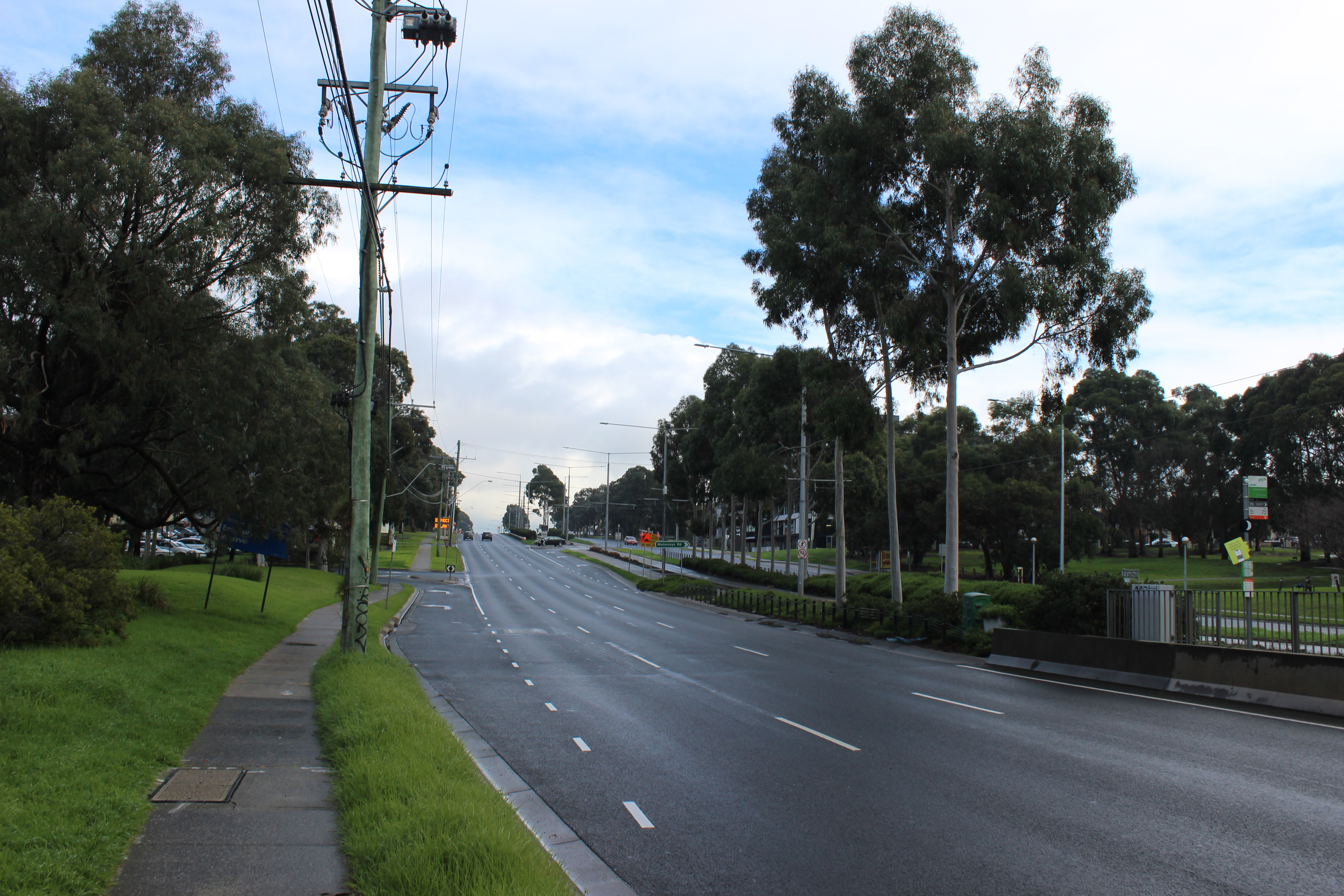
- Burwood Highway through Burwood East
- Coordinates: 37.844730°S 145.039623°E (West end); 37.908355°S 145.355083°E (East end)

General information
- Type: Highway
- Length: 29.7 km (18 mi)
- Gazetted: October 1913 (as Main Road); 1959/60 (as State Highway)
- Route number(s): Metro Route 26 (1965–present) (Hawthorn–Upper Ferntree Gully); C412 (1998–present) (Upper Ferntree Gully–Belgrave); Concurrencies: Metro Route 22 (1965–present) (Ferntree Gully–Upper Ferntree Gully); Metro Route 5 (1989–present) (through Ferntree Gully)
- Former route number: Metro Route 26 (1965–1998) (Upper Ferntree Gully–Belgrave)

Major junctions
- West end: Toorak Road; Hawthorn, Melbourne
- CityLink; Monash Freeway; Warrigal Road; Middleborough Road; Springvale Road; Mountain Highway; EastLink; Mount Dandenong Tourist Road
- East end: Monbulk Road; Belgrave–Gembrook Road; Belgrave, Melbourne

Location(s)
- Major settlements: Burwood, Wantirna South, Ferntree Gully, Upwey

Highway system
- Highways in Australia; National Highway • Freeways in Australia; Highways in Victoria

Burwood Highway (and its western section as Toorak Road) is a major transportation link with Melbourne's eastern fringe at the foot of the Dandenong Ranges, linking the suburbs of Hawthorn and Belgrave. The highway is considered a major link for people who live in the Dandenong Ranges and acts as one of the major feeder roadway in the area along with Canterbury Road, Ferntree Gully Road, EastLink and Wellington Road.

== Route ==
Burwood Highway commences at the interchange with CityLink and Monash Freeway at Hawthorn and heads east as Toorak Road, a four-lane single carriageway (often clogged with heavy traffic) through the southern fringes of Camberwell, with tram services continuing east along the road where it meets Camberwell Road. At the intersection with Warrigal Road in Burwood, it changes name to Burwood Highway and widens to become a six-lane dual carriageway highway, with a dedicated central median for tram tracks, carrying the Route 75 service through Burwood East to Vermont South. It passes the Westfield Knox shopping centre in Wantirna South, heading in a south-easterly direction through Ferntree Gully until it meets Mount Dandenong Tourist Road at Upper Ferntree Gully, where it narrows back to a four-lane single carriageway road, until it eventually terminates at a roundabout with Monbulk and Belgrave–Gembrook Roads in Belgrave.

== History ==
The passing of the Country Roads Act 1912 through the Parliament of Victoria provided for the establishment of the Country Roads Board (later VicRoads) and their ability to declare Main Roads, taking responsibility for the management, construction and care of the state's major roads from local municipalities. (Main) Ferntree Gully Road was declared a Main Road, from Fentree Gully through Upwey to Belgrave (and continuing west through Wheelers Hill to Oakleigh), on 20 October 1913.

The passing of the Country Roads Act 1958 (itself an evolution from the original Highways and Vehicles Act 1924) provided for the declaration of State Highways, roads two-thirds financed by the State government through the Country Roads Board. Burwood Highway was declared a State Highway in the 1959/60 financial year, from Warrigal Road in Burwood via Vermont South, to Upper Ferntree Gully for a total of 12.5 miles (20.1 km), subsuming the original declaration of (Main) Ferntree Gully Road until Upper Ferntree Gully as a Main Road; before this declaration, this road was also referred to as Burwood Road. Toorak Road was declared a Main Road on 9 May 1983, from the intersection with South Eastern Freeway in Hawthorn to meet the western end of Burwood Highway in Burwood.

The declaration of the highway was extended a further 4.0 km (2.5 mi) east along Monbulk Road to Belgrave by VicRoads in June 1990, and west along Toorak Road to the South Eastern Arterial at Hawthorn in October 1993, subsuming its original declaration as a Main Road, however this last section was still known (and signposted) as Toorak Road. The tram line was extended 1.7 km (1.1 mi) along the central median through Burwood East from Middleborough Road to Blackburn Road in July 1993.

Burwood Highway was signed as Metropolitan Route 26 between Burwood and Belgrave in 1965; with Victoria's conversion to the newer alphanumeric system in the late 1990s, the section between Upper Ferntree Gully and Belgrave was replaced by route C412.

The passing of the Road Management Act 2004 granted the responsibility of overall management and development of Victoria's major arterial roads to VicRoads: in 2004, VicRoads re-declared Burwood Highway (Arterial #6750) from Monash Freeway in Hawthorn to Belgrave-Gembrook Road in Belgrave.

== Major intersections ==
LGA	Location	km	mi	Destinations	Notes
Stonnington	Kooyong–Malvern–Hawthorn tripoint	0.0	0.0	Toorak Road (Metro Route 26 west) – Toorak, South Yarra	Western terminus of highway (declared); Metro Route 26 continues west along Toorak Road
Stonnington	Kooyong–Malvern–Hawthorn tripoint	0.0	0.0	CityLink (M1 north) – City, Geelong; Monash Freeway (M1 south) – Chadstone, Dandenong	Single-point urban interchange
Boroondara	Hawthorn	0.1	0.062	Auburn Road – Kew	
Boroondara	Hawthorn East	0.4	0.25	Tooronga Road – Malvern	
Boroondara	Camberwell	1.3	0.81	Burke Road (Metro Route 17) – Caulfield, Camberwell	
Boroondara	Camberwell	2.6	1.6	Glen Iris Road – Glen Iris	
Boroondara	Camberwell	3.2	2.0	Camberwell Road (Metro Route 30) north-west – Camberwell, Hawthorn	No right turn from Camberwell Road to Toorak Road westbound
Boroondara–Whitehorse boundary	Camberwell–Burwood boundary	5.0	3.1	Warrigal Road (Metro Route 15) – Oakleigh, Chadstone, Surrey Hills	Eastern end of Toorak Road; Western end of Burwood Highway (sign-posted)
Whitehorse	Burwood	6.2	3.9	Elgar Road – Doncaster	
Whitehorse	Burwood	7.1	4.4	Station Street (Metro Route 47) – Box Hill, Huntingdale	
Whitehorse	Burwood–Burwood East boundary	8.2	5.1	Middleborough Road (Metro Route 23) – Doncaster, Clayton, Mordialloc	
Whitehorse	Burwood East	9.0	5.6	Blackburn Road (Metro Route 13) – Blackburn, Clayton	
Whitehorse	Burwood East–Forest Hill–Vermont South tripoint	11.5	7.1	Springvale Road (Metro Route 40) – Glen Waverley, Nunawading	
Knox	Wantirna–Wantirna South boundary	14.9	9.3	Mountain Highway (Metro Route 28) – Bayswater, Wantirna	
Knox	Wantirna–Wantirna South boundary	15.4	9.6	EastLink (M3) – Dandenong, Frankston, Ringwood, Melbourne	Diamond interchange
Knox	Wantirna–Wantirna South boundary	17.6	10.9	Stud Road (Metro Route 9) – Bayswater, Scoresby	
Knox	Wantirna South	18.8	11.7	High Street Road (Metro Route 24 south) – Glen Waverley, Glen Iris, Scoresby; Lewis Road (north) – Wantirna South	
Knox	Knoxfield–Ferntree Gully boundary	19.7	12.2	Scoresby Road (Metro Route 7) – Scoresby, Bayswater, Croydon	
Knox	Ferntree Gully	21.6	13.4	Ferntree Gully Road (Metro Route 22 west) – Scoresby, Oakleigh; Commercial Road (north) – Ferntree Gully	Western terminus of concurrency with Metro Route 22
Knox	Ferntree Gully	22.3	13.9	Dorset Road (Metro Route 5 north) – Boronia, Lilydale	Concurrency with Metro Route 5
Knox	Ferntree Gully	22.7	14.1	Glenfern Road (Metro Route 5 south) – Lysterfield, Narre Warren	Concurrency with Metro Route 5
Knox	Ferntree Gully	23.4	14.5	Brenock Park Drive (south) – Lysterfield; Selman Avenue (north) – Ferntree Gully	
Knox–Yarra Ranges boundary	Upper Ferntree Gully	25.4	15.8	Mount Dandenong Tourist Road (C415) – Olinda, Mount Dandenong	Eastern terminuses of Metro Routes 22 and 26; Western terminus of route C412
Yarra Ranges	Tecoma	28.1	17.5	Glenfern Road – Rowville	
Yarra Ranges	Belgrave	29.7	18.5	Monbulk Road (C404 north) – Monbulk, Lilydale; Belgrave–Gembrook Road (C404/C412 east) – Gembrook, Narre Warren; Terrys Avenue (west) – Tecoma	Eastern terminus of highway Route C412 continues east along Belgrave-Gembrook Road
Concurrency terminus; Incomplete access; Route transition

== Gallery ==
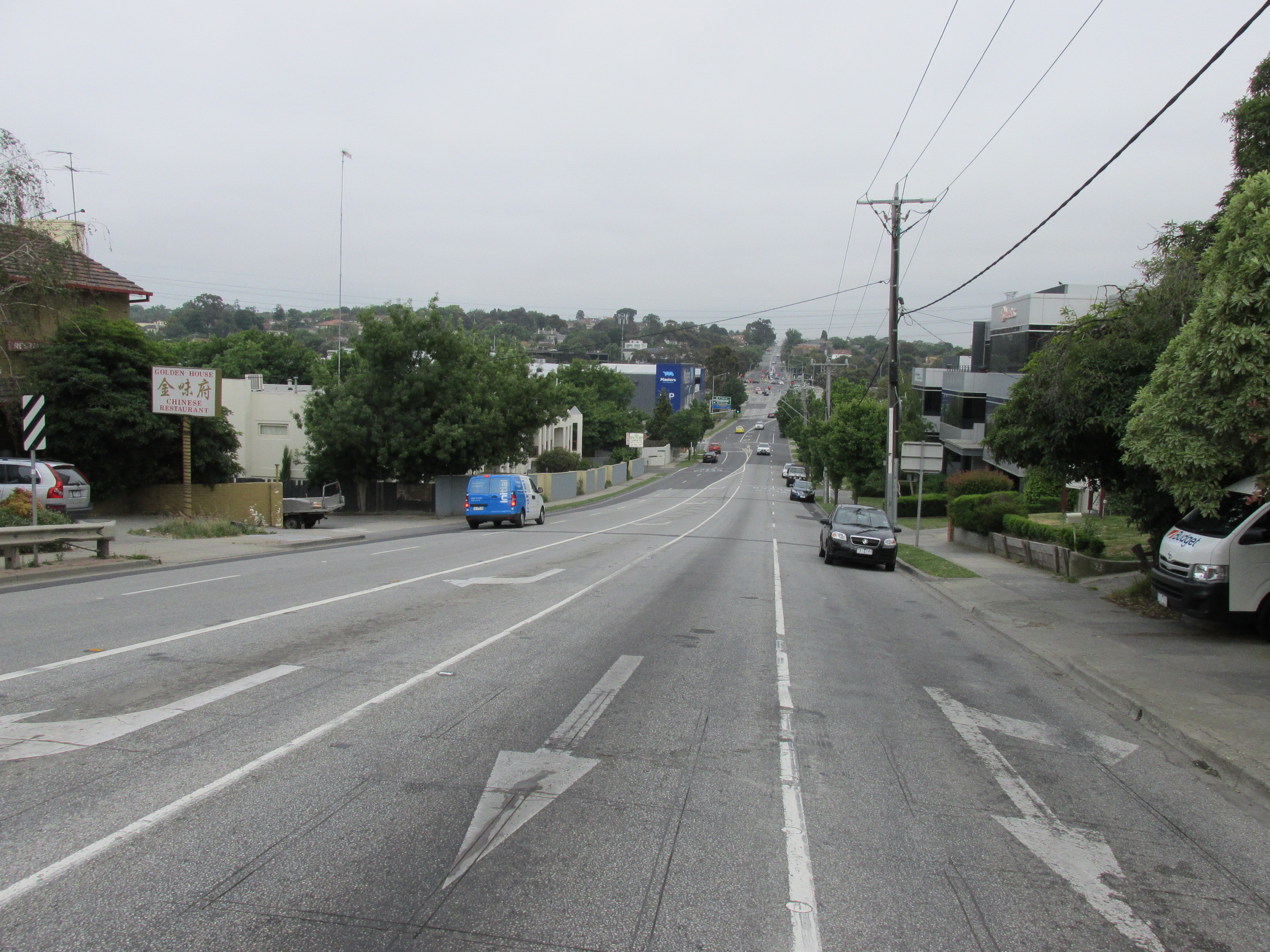
Toorak Road, looking west from Tooronga Road, Hawthorn East

== See also ==
- Highways in Australia
- Highways in Victoria
