= Wantirna College =

Government secondary school in Victoria, Australia

Coordinates: 37°51′23″S 145°13′51″E

Location
- Harold Street; Wantirna, Victoria, Australia

Information
- Type: Government secondary school
- Motto: We Strive We Achieve We Excel
- Established: 1980
- Principal: Carrie Wallis
- Staff: 115
- Enrollment: 1250
- Colours: navy blue, maroon and white
- Publication: College Bulletin (e-newsletter)
- Yearbook: The Falcon magazine Student-produced Year 12 yearbook
- Website: www.wantirnacollege.vic.edu.au

Wantirna College is a state-government secondary school in Wantirna, Victoria, Australia. It was founded in 1980 when the surrounding area was developed from fruit orchards into housing estates. The school services Wantirna and Wantirna South, as well as parts of Boronia, and Bayswater. Approximately 1250 students are enrolled at the college in addition to approximately 85 teaching and 30 non-teaching staff. The school offers a comprehensive curriculum for students studying years seven through to twelve, which includes the Victorian Certificate of Education for students in years ten to twelve and Victorian Certificate of Applied Learning for students in years 11 and 12. The college will receive $11 million from the 2022–2023 Victorian state budget.

== History ==
The college was founded in 1980 when the surrounding area was developed from orchards to housing estates for potential middle class residents. The nearest high schools at the time were Vermont, Highvale and Bayswater. The establishment of Wantirna College catered for this urban growth.

In 1980, only Year 7 was available; in 1981, both Year 7 and 8 were available, and in subsequent years another year level was added until the school finally reached its full strength with Year 12 commencing in 1985.

Construction has been a frequent sight at the college with facilities for students being built or improved. 2001 additions include a new VCE Study/Common Room with kitchen and computer facilities which opened in May 2006, an expanded music area which opened in April 2004 along with new lockers, G block classrooms and a library a few years earlier.

Recently, the college completed additional construction projects in a bid to make the college facilities similar to those available in United States public high schools. These facilities include the new Senior Year General Learning block and the refurbishment of the existing Year 7 Learning Centre. These buildings comprise classrooms, IT labs, collaborative learning spaces and staff-rooms. A new cafeteria includes indoor dining and substantial commercial kitchen facilities (now operated by an external party).

Construction incorporated a new Theatre including rehearsal rooms, storage areas, control rooms and car parking.

Extensive landscape, both hard and soft, was also completed. These works were carried out simultaneously on multiple sites within the school grounds.

== Transport ==
The college is serviced by the public 738 bus route, which runs between Westfield Knox and Mitcham railway station runs every 30 minutes during peak and every hour off-peak. There are also public chartered school buses which service the college before and after school each day. There is also a small staff car park adjacent to the college. The majority of students travel to and from school by either walking or via private vehicles. Smaller numbers of students catch public buses or cycle.
