= List of places on the Victorian Heritage Register in the City of Knox =

This is a list of places on the Victorian Heritage Register in the City of Knox in Victoria, Australia. The Victorian Heritage Register is maintained by the Heritage Council of Victoria.

The Victorian Heritage Register, as of 2021, lists the following two state-registered places within the City of Knox:

Place name	Place #	Location	Suburb or Town	Co-ordinates	Built	State registered	Photo
Pipe Organ	H1280	Our Saviour Lutheran Church; 646 Burwood Highway	Knoxfield	37.876560°S 145.257000°E	1858	9 January 1997	
Templer Church Hall	H1992	3 Wadi Street	Boronia	37.870150°S 145.281240°E	1956-57	27 February 2003	
