= Rembrandts Entertainment Centre =

Coordinates: 37.8729°S 145.2449°E

General information
- Status: Closed
- Type: Theatre/restaurant
- Architectural style: Faux baroque
- Location: 510 Burwood Highway, Wantirna South, Victoria, Australia
- Construction started: 1972
- Opened: 24 July 1979
- Closed: 2007
- Cost: ~ A$1.5m (1979)
- Owner: The Presbyterian Church of Victoria Trusts Corporation (2009–); John Lopes Family Trust (1979–2007)

Technical details
- Floor count: 2
- Floor area: 2,408 sqm.

Design and construction
- Architects: V & H Tzirkas

Other information
- Seating capacity: 600

The Rembrandts Entertainment Centre was a restaurant and theatre venue in the Melbourne suburb of Wantirna South, Australia. It officially opened in 1979 as the largest a la carte restaurant in Victoria. Rembrandts served as a de facto town hall in the newly-formed City of Knox, experiencing significant patronage through the 1980s and 1990s. The venue permanently closed in 2007 and is now owned and maintained by the Presbyterian Church of Victoria Trusts Corporation.

== History ==
According to the restaurant's founder, Vincent Lopes, the idea for Rembrandts came to him in the late 1960s when he was a musician in an Army band. As a musician, he worked in a lot of restaurants and had long thought of running his own. His father, who was a successful pharmacy franchisee, purchased the 4-hectare agricultural site during a time of increased developer interest in the local area, attributed to new zoning laws designed to encourage the development of Knox.

The double-storey building features a striking appearance, referencing French Baroque architecture and incorporating elements of Modernism. It was an early design of the Tzirkas Brothers, who ran a small drafting and design firm specialising in the reproduction of classical architecture styles.

The ground floor housed the main cabaret-style restaurant with tables centred around an entertainment stage and a parqueted dance floor. A grand timber staircase lead to an upstairs function space with a smaller stage and reception area. The building's slate-tiled mansard roof sits atop an earthy-coloured brick facade, adorned by arched windows and grandeur cast iron light posts.

The restaurant was officially opened on 24 July 1979 by the Mayor of Knox.

=== Notable performers ===
- Ricky Nelson (November 1985)
- Jon English
