= Cherie Westell =

Australian missing person

- Cherie Westell
- Born: Melbourne, Victoria, Australia
- Disappeared: 12 December 2000; Wantirna South, Victoria, Australia
- Occupation: Student
- Known for: Unsolved missing person case

Cherie (Sherrie) Westell is an Australian teenager who disappeared on 12 December 2000 in Wantirna South, a suburb of Melbourne, Victoria. She was 15 years old at the time of her disappearance.

== Disappearance ==
Westell was last seen after attending a dental appointment in Wantirna South around 12:30 pm. She later made a phone call from a public telephone box, saying she intended to catch a train home to Ringwood — this was her final confirmed contact.

== Investigation and reward ==
Police have treated the case as a suspected homicide. In December 2022, Victoria Police announced a $1 million reward for information leading to the arrest of those responsible for her disappearance.

== Media coverage and public response ==
The case has been featured in media appeals, including renewed calls from her family, who continue to hope for answers. Journalists and authorities have highlighted the emotional toll on the family and the long-running nature of the investigation.
