= Temple Society Australia =

Christian community

The Temple Society Australia was formed in August 1950 as an autonomous Christian community of the Temple Society, a Radical Pietistic denomination. It brought together the Templers shipped in 1941 from Palestine and interned for the duration of WWII in Tatura, Australia, the 300 still in Palestine at the formation of the State of Israel, and another 400 that over the years came to Australia from Templer Communities in Germany.

The Temple Society Australia views the promotion of Templer belief as its most important task and does this through "Sunday services, Sunday School for children, confirmation classes, weddings, funerals, by articles in the Society's monthly circular, the Templer Record (published since 1946), in correspondence and in daily living."

The greater part of its membership is concentrated in the Melbourne area, with individual communities in the Bentleigh, Bayswater, and Boronia areas, but smaller groups are also located in Sydney and Adelaide. Community halls mark the centre of each community, where religious services and community functions are held regularly.
