= Boronia Heights College =

Location
- Boronia, Victoria; Eastern Metropolitan; Australia; 37°51′36″S 145°18′03″E

Information
- Former names: Boronia Technical School; Boronia Heights Secondary College
- Opened: 1972
- Closed: 2015 (merged with Boronia Primary School)
- School number: 7048
- Principal: Kate Harnetty
- Years offered: 7-12
- Enrollment: 364
- Education system: VCE, VET, VCAL
- Website: www.bhsc.vic.edu.au

Boronia Heights College was a public secondary school in Boronia, a suburb of Melbourne, Victoria, Australia. It officially opened on 5 February 1973 and closed on 31 December 2011.It was originally known as Boronia Technical School and later Boronia Heights Secondary College. In 2014, Boronia Heights College merged with Boronia Primary School to form Boronia K-12 College. In early 2015, the old site of "Boronia Heights College" was shut down and was undergoing demolition as of August 2015.

== See also ==
- List of schools in Victoria
- Victorian Certificate of Education
