= Vermont South =

- Suburb
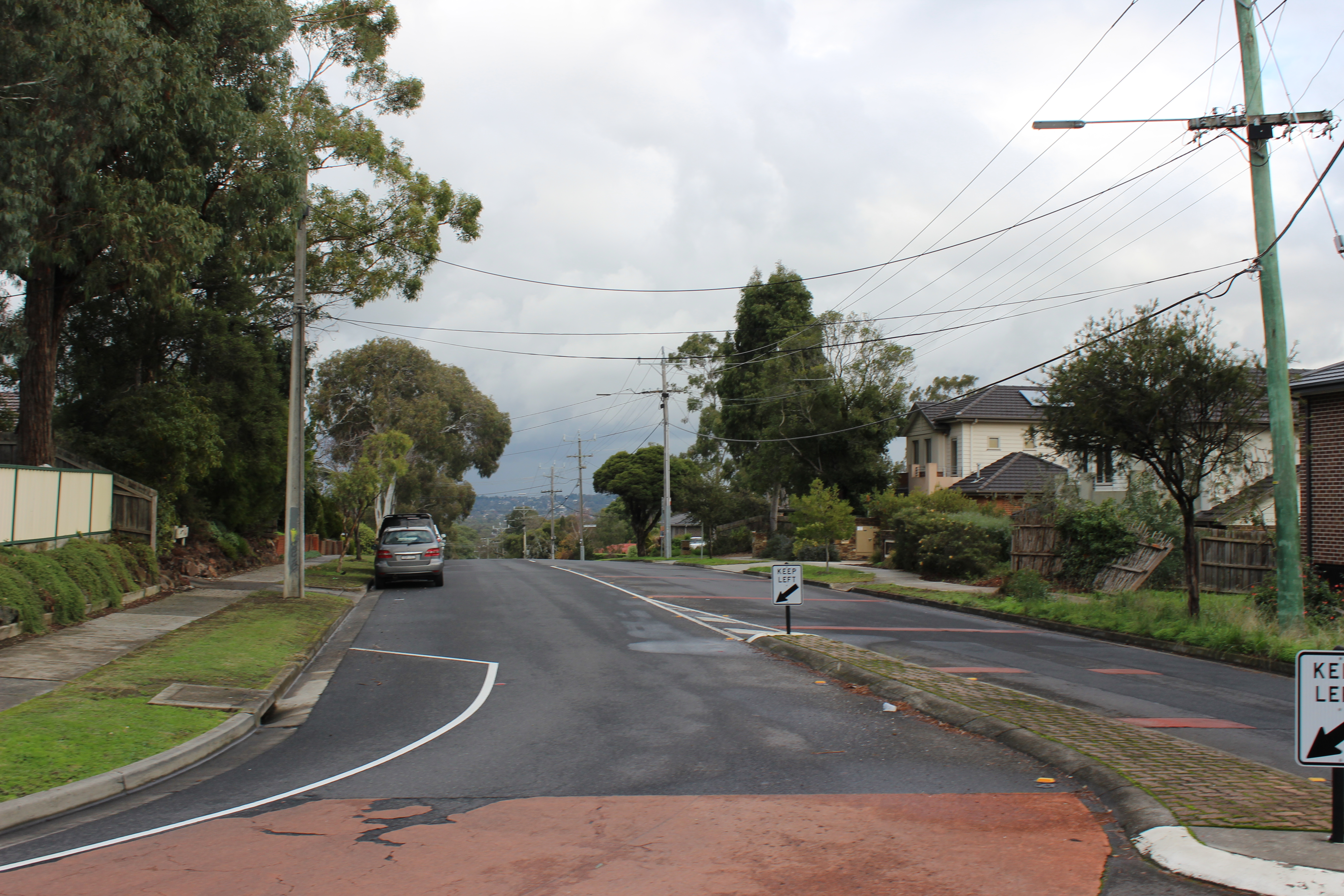
- Morack Road, Vermont South

- Interactive map of Vermont South
- Coordinates: 37.851°S 145.183°E
- Country: Australia
- State: Victoria
- City: Melbourne
- LGA: City of Whitehorse
- Location: 19 km (12 mi) from Melbourne

Government
  - State electorate: Glen Waverley
  - Federal division: Deakin

Area
  - Total: 6.3 km^{2} (2.4 sq mi)

Population
  - Total: 11,954 (SAL 2021)
- Postcode: 3133
- Gazetted: 30 April 1968
Suburbs around Vermont South
Forest Hill	Vermont	Wantirna
Burwood East	Vermont South	Wantirna South
Glen Waverley	Glen Waverley	Wantirna South

Vermont South is a suburb of Melbourne, Australia, 19 km (12 miles) east of its Central Business District. It had a population of 11,954 at the 2021 census. The eastern boundary is Dandenong Creek, which flows from the Dandenong Ranges through to Port Phillip. The suburb was mostly developed in the late 1960s through till the mid-1970s after developers bought the orchards in the area. Vermont is derived from the French language meaning "green hill".

== History ==
Before the first European colonialists, the landscape was thickly timbered bushland, occupied by the Wurundjeri, Indigenous Australians of the Kulin nation, who spoke variations of the Woiwurrung language group. They were hunters and gatherers, camping in the creeks and gullies near where Felgate Parade, Woodleigh Crescent, Great Western Drive, the Bellbird Dell and Billabong Park are located today.

After settlers decided their fortune was not to be made in the Victorian gold fields, they turned to the land as there was a living to be made supplying the needs of the fast growing Melbourne. The settlers cleared their land and sold the timber for firewood in Melbourne. Other settlers burned the timber and sold the charcoal instead.

With the money earned, settlers could purchase supplies to bring home on their return journey. Housewives also made butter to sell at grocers in Prahran. The settlers split their own timber for fencing and homes. Some homes were built of wattle and daub with bark roofs. The first crops were hay, potatoes and other root vegetables. Cash was scarce and barter arrangements were common.

The area was first surveyed in 1855 by Clement Hodgkinson. By the 1880s, apart from some general farming, orchards dominated much of the area's landscape. The peak of growing fruit was between 1930 and 1939, followed by a steady decline due to labour shortages and lack of markets during the Second World War.

The original purchaser of the Morack Road area was John Lobb, who in 1862 subdivided the land into a village called Norwich. It was to have a central market square, a church at each corner and a cemetery on Canterbury Road. All the land outside the town was divided into two or five acre blocks which were meant to be vineyards. The peculiar right-angular turns in Morack Road, therefore, were meant to be the ring around the square. The development ultimately went bust.

The 1968 Metropolitan Melbourne Planning Scheme was divided the locality of East Burwood into two suburbs; Vermont South and Burwood East. Additionally, a large portion of land just north of Springvale Road was rezoned for residential purposes. Subsequent rate increases forced many of orchardists and farmers to sell their landholdings to developers, many of which had kept in the family for over a century.

City Engineer Bill Sewart drew up a master plan for Vermont South, so that as each parcel of land came up for subdivision the plan had to conform with the road layout and other matters set out in the master plan. In conjunction with the Education Department, land was designated for the Livingstone and Weeden Primary schools. A high school site was selected on the south of Burwood Highway, but this ultimately did not proceed. Council filed a compulsory land acquisition request with the Supreme Court, which lead to the purchase of land at Livingstone Road for municipal purposes. The Vermont South Library, a child care centre, the Vermont South Community house, and various sporting facilities were later established here.

The Burwood Rise estate, which occupies a large area between Livingstone and Stanley Roads (and around Dalroy Crescent & Consort Avenue), was developed between 1968 and 1971. It formed the suburb's first major housing project and aimed to house future customers of the nearby Forest Hill Shopping Centre, which was owned by the estate's developers, Maurice Alter, Paul Fayman and George Herscu.

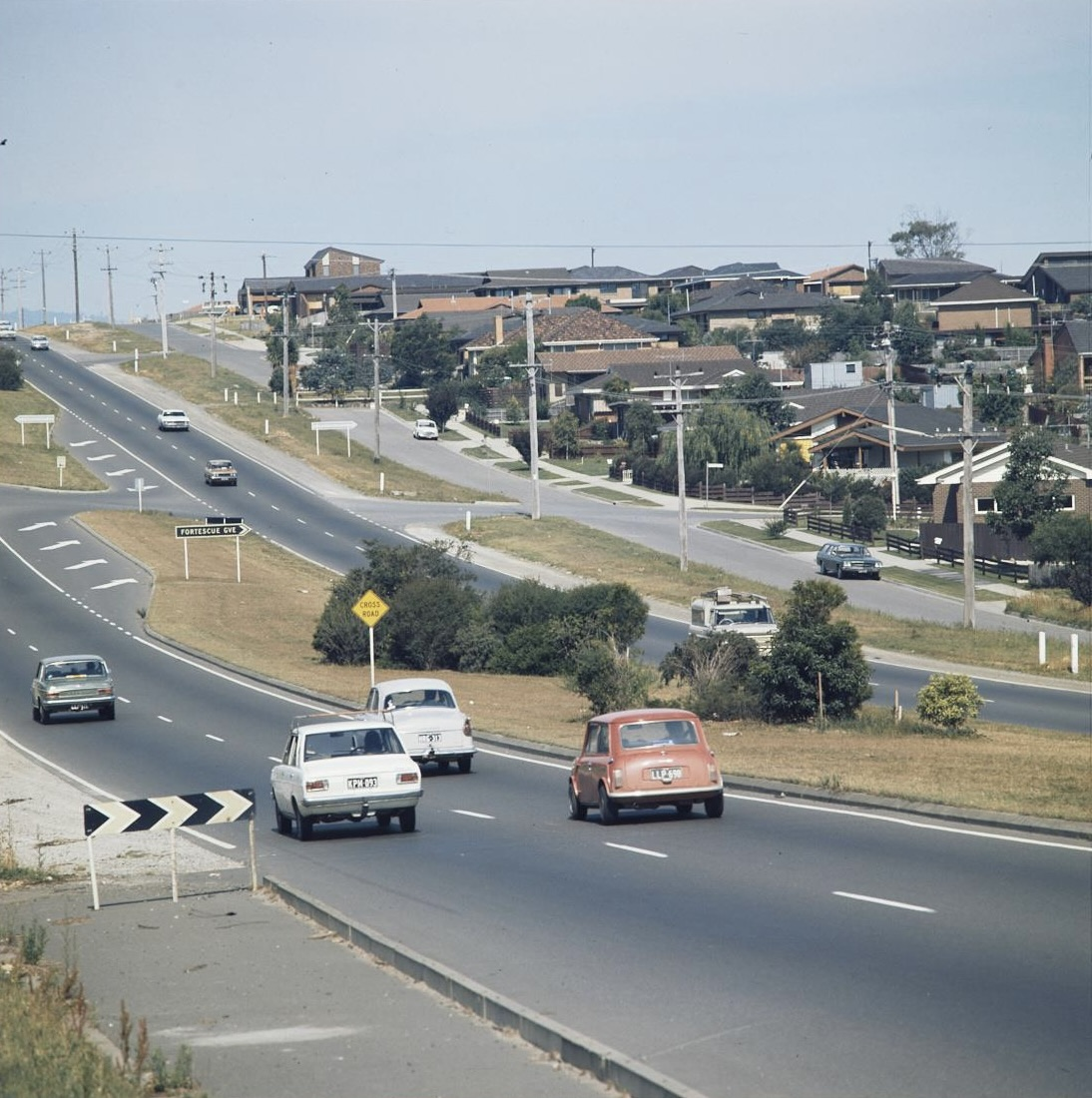
Burwood Highway, 1975

Construction of large residential estates continued well into the 1980s, with the largest being developed by the Hanover Holdings conglomerate with over 800 blocks in and around Hanover Road, Mellissa Grove, Chablis Crescent, Hartland Road, Delacombe Drive and Woodleigh Crescent. Hanover's homebuilding division, Hanover Homes, also built a few hundred homes in the suburb.

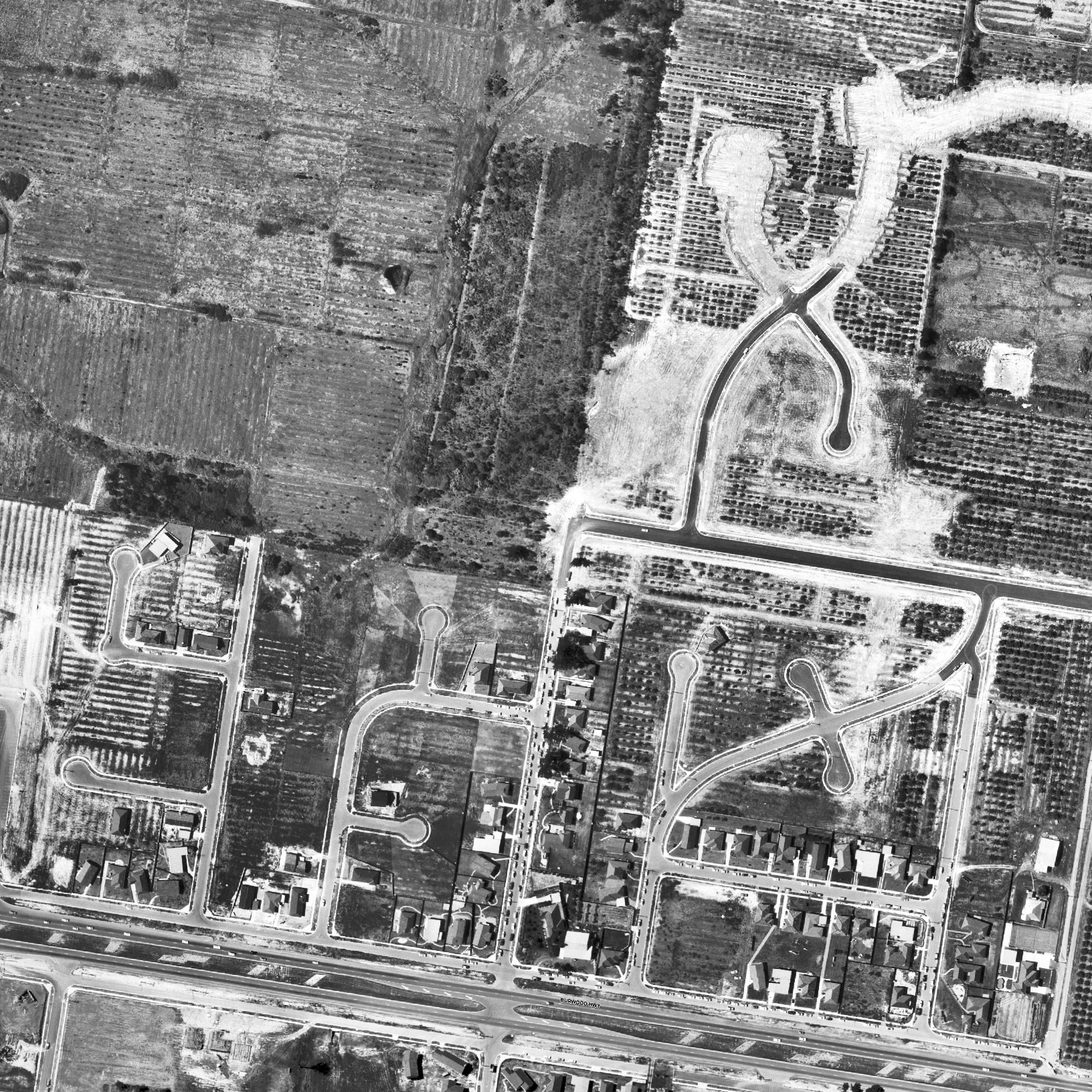
Burwood Rise estate, 1969

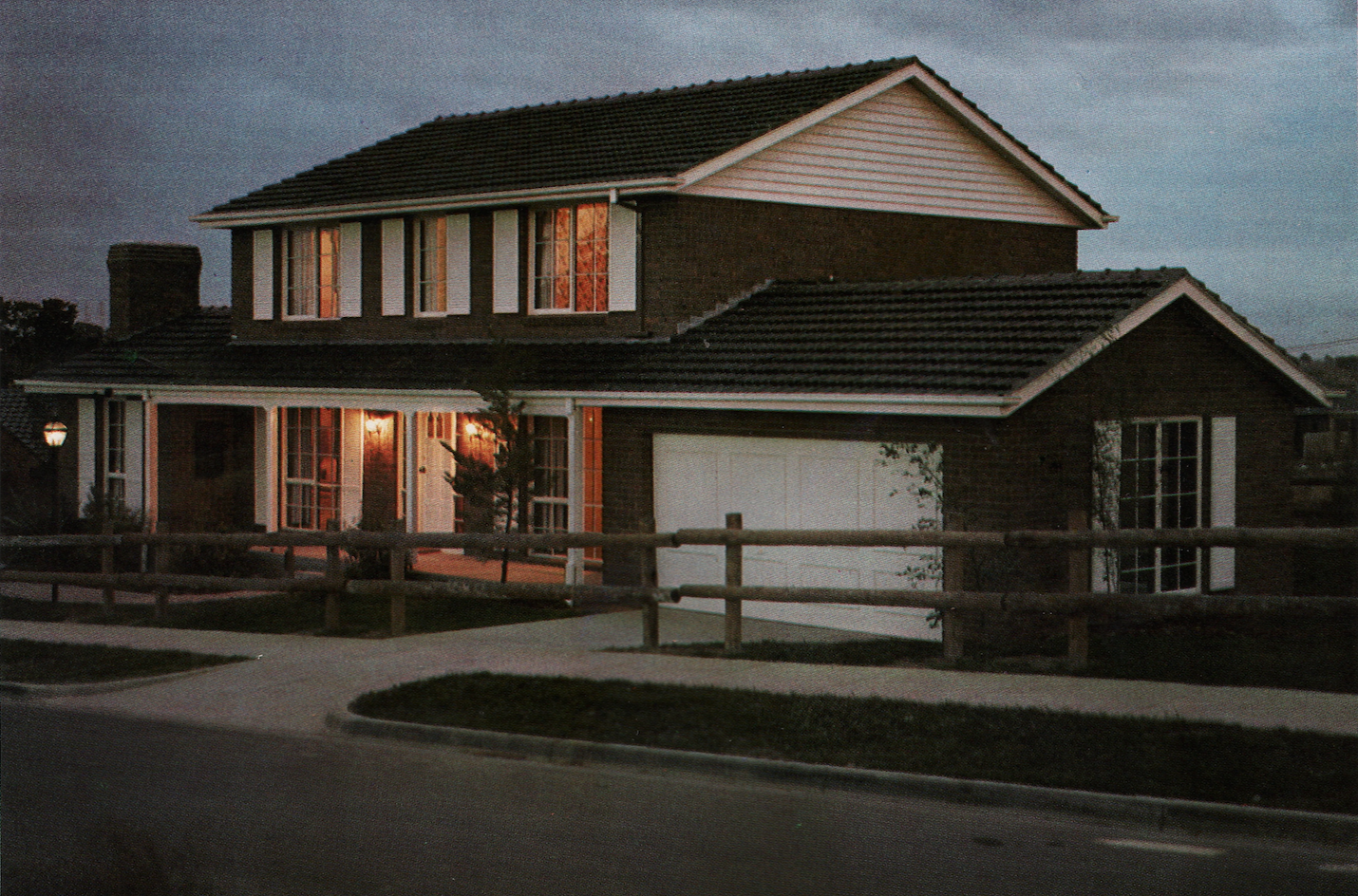
Display home (1975)

Beginning in 1969 and continuing well into the 1970s, local builders opened display homes along Burwood Highway and Springvale Road. It formed one of Australia's largest display home precincts, comprising around 100 individual designs by over 20 building companies. Tomkin Homes premiered their upmarket "Jamestown" design at 15 Stanley Road, which created traffic jams on the opening weekend in 1969 as it drew an estimated crowd of 27,000. In early 1974, a company called Craftsman Homes launched their Executive Mansion, which at the time was the most expensive display home in the country.

== Commercial ==
In 1967, Melbourne's prominent Jacobson family announced that they would establish a modern, car-oriented hotel/motel complex at the north-east corner of the Burwood Highway and Springvale Road. Works commenced in the second half of 1968 and the premises opened in 1969. The Burvale was popular as a live music venue during the 1970s, performances there included a concert by AC/DC in December 1975. A heritage overlay was proposal by Whitehorse Council in 2015 but was ultimately overlooked.

The Vermont South Shopping Centre opened in 1974 and is located at the corner of Burwood Highway and Hanover Road in the Melbourne suburb of Vermont South, Victoria. Anchored by supermarket chains Aldi and Coles, it has 650 parking spaces and over 50 specialty stores.

In 2005, construction began at Burwood Highway of the largest Bunnings warehouse in Australia at the time - creating more than 200 jobs for the local community and representing an investment of $25 million. The main store has approximately 979 bays (or 3 km) of merchandise and featured in a Better Homes and Gardens special. A 2,000m^{2} Officeworks with 49 parking spaces was completed next to the Bunnings in 2012.

== Statistics ==
=== 2021 Census data ===
- Population: 11,954 (48.1% male, 51.9% female)
- Number of families: 3,453
- Number of private dwellings: 4,443
- Average number of people per household: 2.8
- Median weekly household income: $1,944
- Median weekly rent: $496
- Average number of motor vehicles per dwelling: 2
- Median age: 46
- Country of birth, top responses: Australia (6,136), China (1,694), Malaysia (500), India (406), Sri Lanka (290) & England (289)
- Religious affiliation, top responses: No Religion (4,515), Catholic (2,072), Anglican (766), Not Stated (673) & Buddhism (669)

== In Film & TV ==
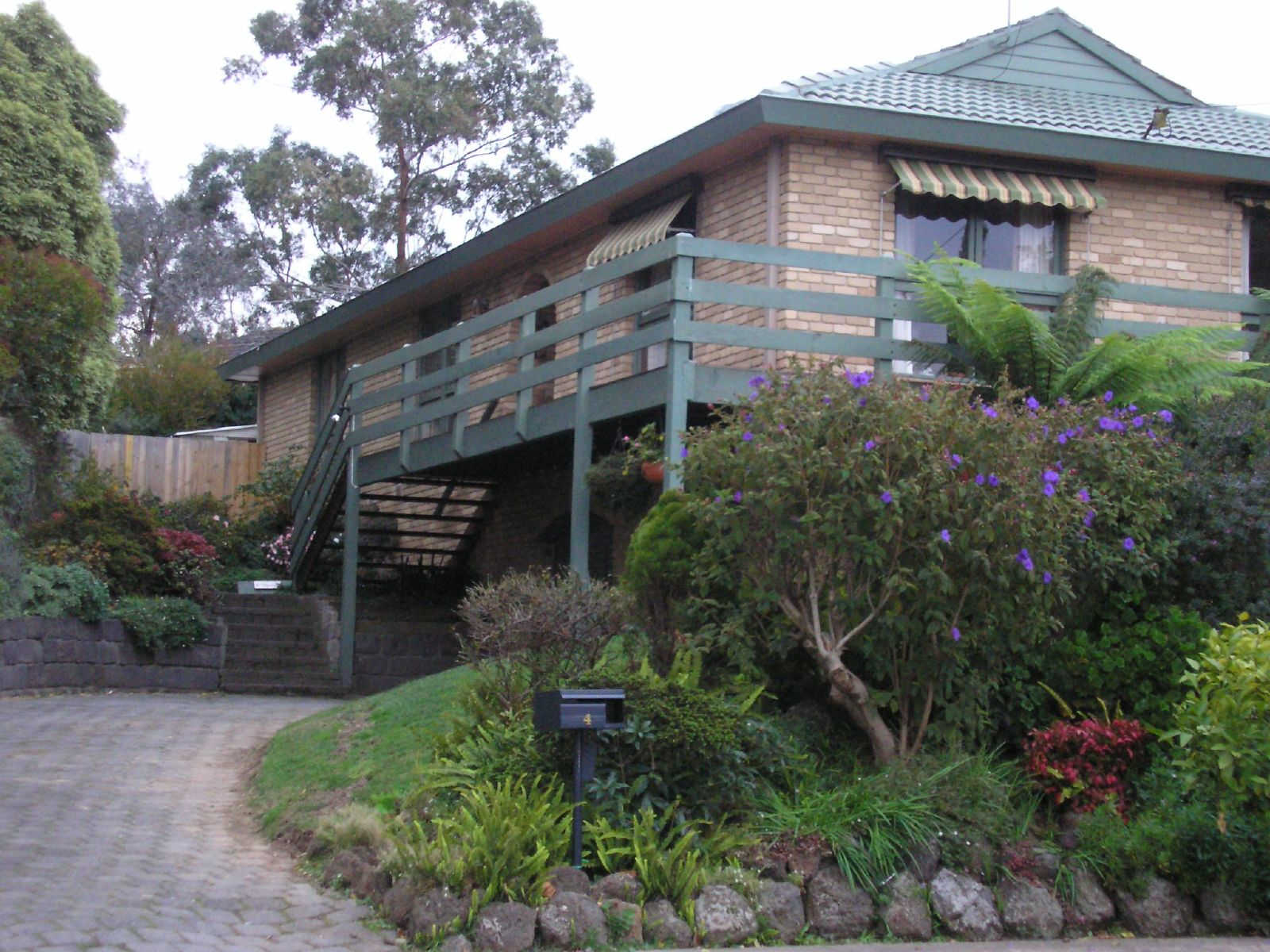
Ramsay House

=== Neighbours ===
The year 1986 marked the debut of a new Channel Ten TV series that would go on to achieve notable longevity: a teen-oriented soap opera simply titled Neighbours. Filming took place at the Forest Hill studios, where the old Holiday Island set was repurposed to represent the fictional Lasseter's Hotel complex. Location filming was primarily focused on the nearby cul-de-sac, Pin Oak Court, which stood in for the fictional Ramsay Street for the entire 40-year duration of the show's run. Other locations in the fictional city of Erinsborough include a house in Huskey Court (Beverley Marshall's house), the Saxonwood Apartments building (Karl's Apartment), Biralee Pre-School (India's Pre-School), Weeden Heights Primary School (‘Erinsborough Primary School’) and the Burvale Hotel. Singer-songwriter Adele visited Pin Oak Court in March 2017.
