= Wantirna =

- Suburb
- Interactive map of Wantirna
- Coordinates: 37.844°S 145.229°E
- Country: Australia
- State: Victoria
- City: Melbourne
- LGA: City of Knox
- Location: 24 km (15 mi) from Melbourne

Government
  - State electorate: Bayswater
  - Federal division: Aston

Area
  - Total: 8.3 km^{2} (3.2 sq mi)
- Elevation: 91 m (299 ft)

Population
  - Total: 14,237 (2021 census)
  - Density: 1,715/km^{2} (4,443/sq mi)
- Postcode: 3152
Suburbs around Wantirna
Vermont	Ringwood	Heathmont
Vermont	Wantirna	Bayswater
Vermont South	Wantirna South	Wantirna South

Wantirna is a suburb in Melbourne, Victoria, Australia, 24 km (15 mi) east of Melbourne's Central Business District, located within the City of Knox local government area. Wantirna recorded a population of 14,237 at the 2021 census.

The name is derived from the local Aboriginal people's expression for, "a gurgling stream".

The EastLink tollway runs through Wantirna with interchanges at Boronia Road and Burwood Highway.

== History ==
Wantirna was first settled by Australians of European descent in 1840 when Mrs. Madeline Scott established the "Bushy Park" cattle run on the banks of the Dandenong Creek. During the 1870s other pioneers opened up the area to settlement.

In 1912 the need for a school to serve the local area soon became apparent as the population grew. The Finger family donated two acres of land on the southern side of Mountain Highway (then known as Wantirna-Sassafras Rd) and a timber schoolhouse was opened.

The Finger and Fankhauser families were prime movers in the erection of the Methodist Church opened opposite the school in May 1914, and a parish hall was built on Burwood Highway in 1924. Wantirna Post Office opened on 1 November 1913, closed in 1977, and reopened in 1983.

The Wantirna Reserve was provided by the council in 1925 and a tennis court was built there shortly afterwards. In December 1939, after the outbreak of World War II, West Prussia Road was renamed Wantirna Road.

== Notable locations ==
Knox Private Hospital and Westfield Knox shopping centre are located in Wantirna.

Koomba Park is a large native bushland park spanning the area between Dandenong Creek and the Eastlink Tollway. It is run by Parks Victoria and was opened in 1982.

The Australian Jazz Museum (formerly the Victorian Jazz Archive) is located in Koomba Park.

Locations in Wantirna, such as Westfield Knox, are occasionally used to film the soap opera Neighbours.

== Schools ==
Schools in Wantirna include:

- Wantirna Primary School
- Wantirna College
- Regency Park Primary School
- Templeton Primary School
- St Luke's Primary School

== Churches ==
- Hills Bible Church
- Knox Presbyterian Church
- The Church of Jesus Christ of Latter-day Saints, Stake Centre and the Melbourne Australia Temple (churchofjesuschrist.org)
