= Westfield Knox =

- Location: Wantirna South, Victoria, Australia
- Coordinates: 37°52′08″S 145°14′28″E
- Opened: Knox City: 1977; Knox Ozone: (as Knox District Centre); 1988
- Developer: AMP Capital
- Manager: Scentre Group
- Owner: AMP Capital (1969–2012)
- Architect: McIntyre McIntyre & Partners (1974–77); Buchan, Laird & Bawden (1984–1987); Ronald G. Monsbourgh & Associates (1987–90); Classical Architecture Group (2021–23)
- Num. of stores: 384
- Num. of anchor tenants: 20 (9 major, 11 minor)
- Floor area: 140,516 m^{2} (1,512,500 sq ft)
- Floors: 4
- Parking: 5,641
- Website: westfield.com.au/knox

Westfield Knox, formerly Knox City Shopping Centre, is an Australian shopping centre, outdoor entertainment and professional services complex in the outer eastern Melbourne suburb of Wantirna South.

There are over 380 stores and over 5,600 car parking spaces. The centre is the seventh-largest in Australia, and Scentre Group's second-largest centre in Victoria in terms of gross leasable area, behind Westfield Fountain Gate. There is also a seven-floor office tower at the southern side of the centre, as well as low-rise offices dotting the O-Zone precinct, an indoor food court, and an outdoor restaurant strip mall. In October 2012, the Westfield Group acquired AMP's share of the centre and was subsequently rebranded as Westfield Knox.

== History ==
Knox City Shopping Centre was officially opened on 9 November 1977.

=== Planning and design ===
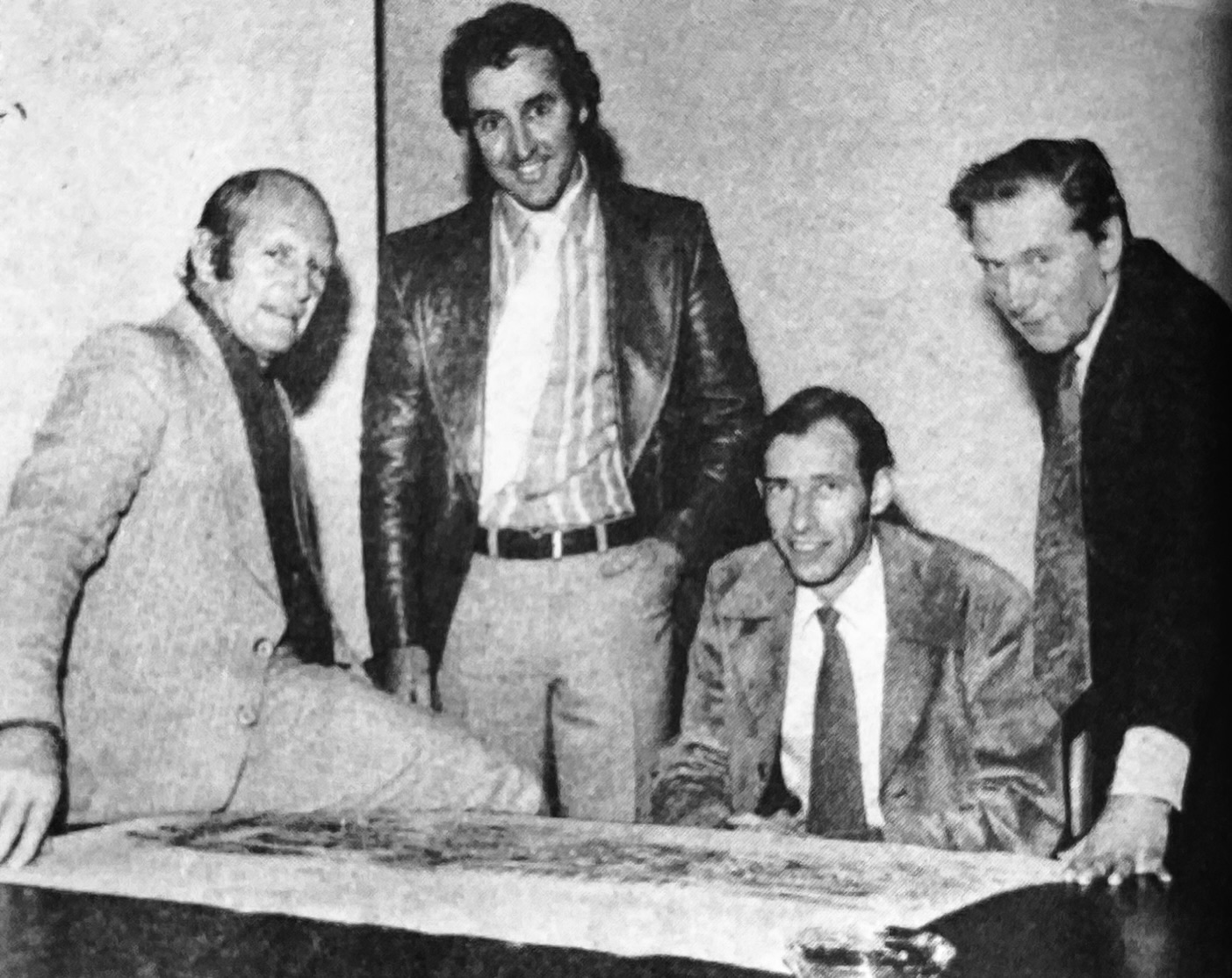
Original design and development team

In early 1968, the Australian Mutual Provident Society (AMP) applied to the Shire of Knox to have a 33-acre block at the north-east corner of Burwood Highway and Stud Road rezoned to accommodate a large regional shopping centre. The centre was originally going to be called the Studwood Shopping Centre, however this name was later abandoned in favour of Knox City Shopping Centre.

The centre was originally meant to open in 1972, however, Council received around 1000 objections from local residents. About 160 people asked for theirs to be heard. A major objector was the Boronia Chamber of Commerce, which claimed that existing shopping centres had ample opportunities for expansion and that the proposed development was inappropriate. It wasn't until March 1970 that the rezoning was approved by the Minister for Local Government.

The architectural firm of McIntyre, McIntyre and Partners were awarded a $30 million tender to design the new complex. Their plans were approved over the second half of 1974. The design blended elements of Brutalism and Modern architecture. Architect Peter McIntyre was given the Buildings Award Bronze Medal by the Victorian Chapter of the Royal Australian Institute of Architects in 1978 for the design of Knox City Shopping Centre.

=== Construction ===
The land on which the centre stands was originally a low-lying swamp and proclaimed flood plain adjoining Blind Creek. In August 1974, a 700-metre section of the watercourse was diverted below the future shopping centre car park through twin drainage pipes. All foliage, topsoil and inferior foundation material was removed and in its place was constructed a podium of engineered fill, some one metre above the final car park level. The six-hectare building was set on this podium.

The building's foundations were in the form of 1208 friction piles, driven in groups under the main structure and driven individually under the suspended car park. By the second half of 1976, the office tower, cinema, library and indoor mall were being fitted out with electrical, mechanical, air conditioning and fire services, by Rankine & Hill, who were also the quantity surveyors for the project.

About 500,000 white, reeded concrete blocks were used as cladding. These were designed by the architects expressly for the centre and produced by Enco Besser Masonry. Large quantities of scaffolding were required both inside and out, which was laid in an unorthodox, angular layout rather than vertical, to give block-layers ready but safe access to all parts of the structure. The original landscaping works covered over 28,000 square metres and had thousands of primarily native shrubs and trees.. The overall cost of the project was double the original budget.

=== Original tenants ===
Prior to the letting of space, the AMP Society engaged economic consultants George J. Conner & Associates to prepare a study of the size, age and economic status of the local population. The intention was to have a diverse but calculated range of stores that would appeal to local customers. All 87 stores were occupied and fitted out in time for the official opening in 1977, including a three-level Myer department store, a twin Dendy Cinemas complex, a public library, a Target discount department store, a Target supermarket, a McEwans hardware and 83 speciality shops.

== Redevelopments ==
Throughout 1989 and 1990, the centre was doubled in size and the original section completely refurbished. A fourth floor was added to the Myer store, the undercover car parks were expanded and new promenade, market and food court areas were added. The Target supermarket was removed and new Coles and Bi-Lo supermarkets opened. Target was also expanded in size. Venture also opened on level two where Toys "R" Us resided The twin cinemas were replaced with a 10-screen Village Cinemas complex, which opened in 1988 (replaced in 2002 and now unused above JB Hi-Fi). On the adjacent block an outdoor shopping centre was established, known as the Knox District Centre (later Knox Towerpoint and now Knox O-Zone).

Former logo of Knox City Shopping Centre, and the logo for the Knox-O-Zone.

During 1997, the centre saw a minor refurbishment. An updated logo was introduced, along with new signage. The food court was remodelled and introduced food decorations on the walls above the food outlets, palm trees, new tables and chairs as well as the opening of Hungry Jack's. Lincraft was also relocated when McEwans closed down. However, it itself has closed down to make way for a new Harris Scarfe in October 2009. Best & Less moved into Lincraft's old retail space. The Reject Shop also moved from opposite Coles to The Market area.

In 2002, the centre was extended further at a cost of $150 million. The Knox Towerpoint complex was renamed Knox O-Zone and joined to Knox City Shopping Centre through an expansion of the shopping centre eastwards and redevelopment of the O-Zone shops. The eastern section of the centre was completely redeveloped, which opened on 17 October 2002 with the new Knox O-Zone opening on 31 October. The exterior of the existing shopping centre was also painted. Currently there are over 350 retailers throughout the complex and 6,391 car parking spaces available.

In October 2012, Westfield Group purchased the centre, adding it to their franchise. As of July 2014, the Westfield Group became two companies Scentre Group and Westfield Corporation. The Westfield Group portion is now owned by Scentre Group.

=== Planned expansion ===
In October 2014, an application to expand the centre was approved by the Knox City Council. The plan included a $450 million expansion southward from 142,500 m^{2} to 188,500 m^{2}, becoming the second largest centre in Australia, only behind Chadstone. Beginning by 2016 and opening in stages from 2017, the project was intended to include an international retail and fashion precinct, a new cafe area and the relocation of a discount department store further towards the Burwood Highway frontage to accommodate for new corridors. Secondary refurbishments and upgrades to the Ozone precinct were also intended to commence in 2015, including the relocation of the bus interchange and library into this area, east of their present locations. Approximately 2,650 additional parking spaces from new multi-deck car parks would also be available.

However, as of September 2017, there had been no expansion of the shopping centre, with no word of when construction would begin. The permit to expand Westfield Knox was set to expire in November 2017, unless an extension was granted. Many of the storefronts were in poor condition and were in need of repairs. In particular, the former Myer store was in a poor state, with carpet wearing out, floor tiles missing, paint peeling, and shelves damaged. The second Coles supermarket (formerly BI-LO) had suffered lighting issues on occasions in the last years; Coles and Myer were considered to be waiting for the redevelopment of the shopping centre to begin before improving the state of their stores.

In December 2019, new plans to refurbish Westfield Knox were released after their original building permit from Knox City Council expired. The updated plans showed a smaller Myer with two floors and a casual dining precinct with an outdoor children's play area. Stewart White of Scentre Group - who lodged plans on behalf of Westfield and is the group's development and strategic asset management director - said that the updated plans included a fresh food, fashion, and casual dining precinct. He also said that the library would be relocated into Knox Ozone while not revealing a specific location. Knox will introduce retail partners and dedicated office space in retail space that used to belong to Myer.

Myer revealed in March 2021 that they would close down their Knox store by the end of July that year, leading to speculation of what would take its place. Days later, it was revealed that Woolworths would take over the ground floor of the former Myer space, with a new 2000sqm Knox Library taking up Levels 3 and 4.

In December 2022, Westfield officially opened level 1 of their new expansion area with Woolworths, Aldi, and the new Dining Hall. Other areas of the upgrade opened gradually throughout 2023, including the new Library, Level 2 of the expansion area, the Basketball Court, the Swim School, and the new mini-major retailers in the old food court area. A new food court (separate to the Dining Hall) also opened, in the previous fresh food market space. The new fashion mall is anchored by Uniqlo, MECCA, Glassons, General Pants Co. and JD Sports. JB Hi-Fi and Rebel were among the stores to relocate to new spaces in the redevelopment.

== Retail ==
Major Retailers include Coles, Woolworths, Aldi, Kmart, Target, Harris Scarfe, Muji, Uniqlo and Rebel

Mini Major Retailers include Cotton On, Baby Bunting, Chemist Warehouse, The Reject Shop, Best&Less, JB Hi-Fi, TK Maxx, Priceline Pharmacy, Terry White Chemart, JD Sports, Mecca Cosmetica and Toymate

Former Retailers include Myer, Harvey Norman, Toys R Us, Dick Smith, Pumpkin Patch, Bi-Lo, Venture, Dimmeys and McEwans

== Transport ==
Westfield Knox provides parking for around 5967 vehicles and is serviced by 11 bus routes and taxis.

== Filming ==
The mall has been utilised as a filming location a number of times in recent years for the Australian television soap, Neighbours, particularly the Village Cinemas entrance. It was also used in the comedy series Full Frontal in season 2 mainly using the entrance of Village Cinemas.
