= Scoresby, Victoria =

Scoresby
- Suburb
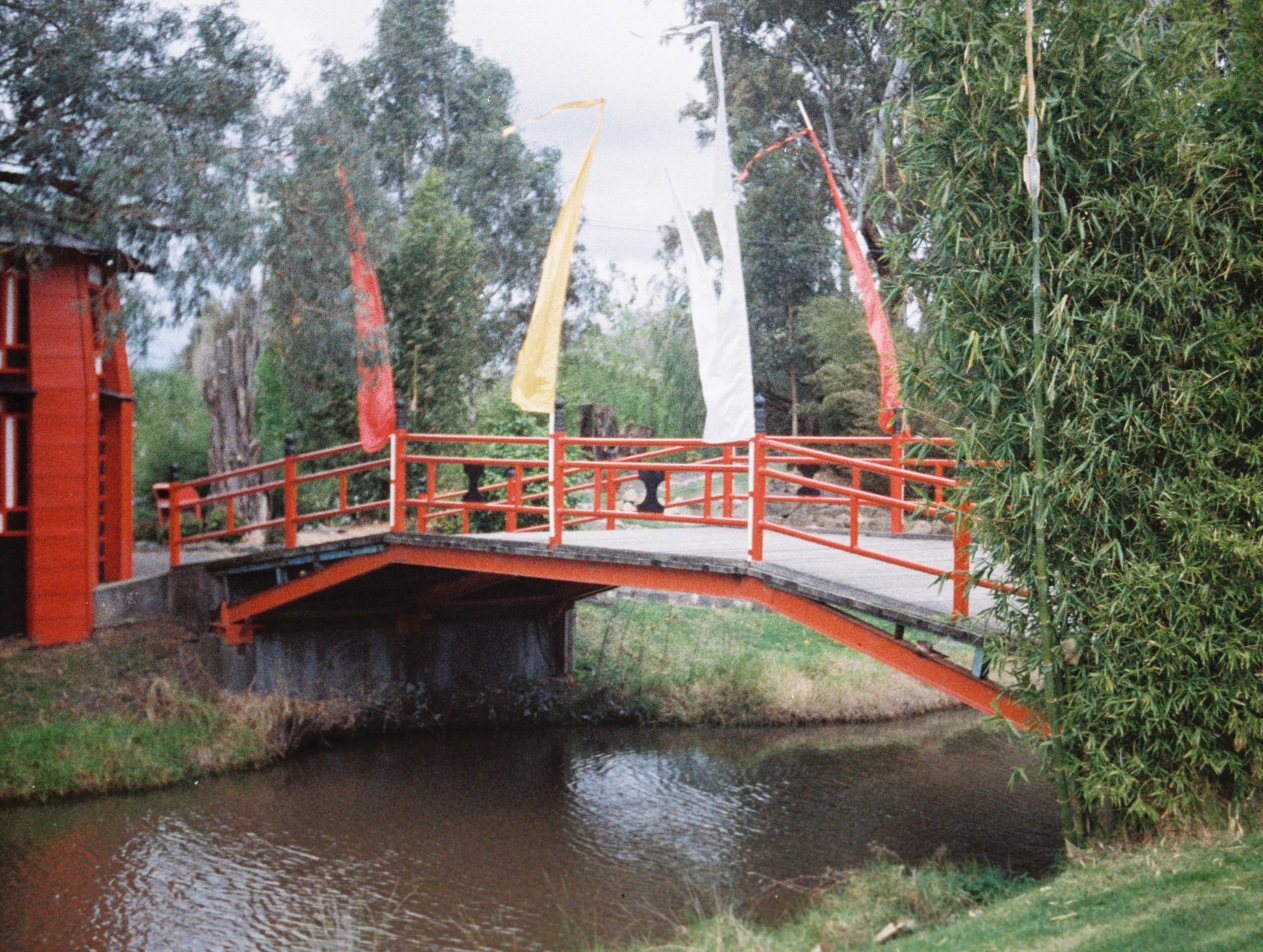
- A bridge in Scoresby

- Interactive map of Scoresby
- Coordinates: 37.894°S 145.234°E
- Country: Australia
- State: Victoria
- City: Melbourne
- LGA: City of Knox
- Location: 29 km (18 mi) from Melbourne
- Established: 1870s

Government
  - State electorate: Rowville
  - Federal division: Aston

Area
  - Total: 9.4 km^{2} (3.6 sq mi)
- Elevation: 80 m (260 ft)

Population
  - Total: 6,066 (2021 census)
  - Density: 645/km^{2} (1,671/sq mi)
- Postcode: 3179
Suburbs around Scoresby
Wantirna South	Wantirna South	Knoxfield
Glen Waverley	Scoresby	Knoxfield
Wheelers Hill	Rowville	Rowville

Scoresby is a suburb in Melbourne, Victoria, Australia, 29 km east of Melbourne's Central Business District, located within the City of Knox local government area. Scoresby recorded a population of 6,066 at the 2021 census.

In the Parish system of Victoria (mainly used with land-ownership documents) the local parish is called Scoresby, a part of the County of Mornington.

== History ==
The area of Scoresby was surveyed in 1857, and named after the Arctic explorer William Scoresby. Scoresby had died the previous year, shortly after his visit to the colony to experiment with terrestrial magnetism near the area which now carries his name. A township developed in the 1870s around the intersection of Stud Road and Ferntree Gully Road. A school was established in 1872, followed by a Methodist church. Once the swampy ground was drained, market gardens were established. Scoresby Post Office opened on 20 January 1890, closed in 1979 and reopened in 1984 as the suburb grew.

== Present day ==
Scoresby contains a number of extensive industrial estates which are home to a variety of major national and international corporations including Nintendo's Australian headquarters.

Caribbean Gardens, an entertainment precinct and market, is open every Wednesday and Sunday. The precinct is centred on Caribbean Lake, which was built for the testing of boats by the boat manufacturer Caribbean Boats. Activities at Caribbean Gardens include buying and selling of all kinds of products, eating, drinking, walking around, music played by bands and computer swap meets. The market and site closed in 2020 due to COVID. Another popular "Caribbean" place in Scoresby is Caribbean Rollerama.

Scoresby village is the main shopping precinct in Scoresby. It includes a supermarket and many other small stores, hairdressers and other services. These stores are arranged around a central carpark with the local football field behind.

== Education ==
There are two primary schools in the area, state school Scoresby Primary School and private school (St. Judes). The secondary education provider in Scoresby is Scoresby Secondary College.

== Climate ==
Scoresby has a weather station which collects data for the Bureau of Meteorology. It commenced readings in 1948 and is situated at Latitude 37.87°S and Longitude 145.26°E at an elevation of 80m above sea level. The site name is the Scoresby Research Institute and its site number is 086104, however it is not actually based in Scoresby, but in the suburb of Knoxfield. Hourly weather observations taken from Scoresby can be viewed from the Bureau of Meteorology website.

Scoresby has an oceanic climate with certain subtropical influences similar to the rest of the Greater Melbourne area. It is wetter than Melbourne CBD and the suburbs to the north due to the "bay effect" set up by Port Phillip to the east, where showers are intensified leeward of the bay.

Climate data for Scoresby (1991–2020 normals; extremes 1965–present)
Month	Jan	Feb	Mar	Apr	May	Jun	Jul	Aug	Sep	Oct	Nov	Dec	Year
Record high °C (°F)	43.8 (110.8)	46.1 (115.0)	39.8 (103.6)	33.4 (92.1)	26.6 (79.9)	22.2 (72.0)	22.2 (72.0)	24.3 (75.7)	30.8 (87.4)	35.0 (95.0)	39.4 (102.9)	41.8 (107.2)	46.1 (115.0)
Mean daily maximum °C (°F)	27.1 (80.8)	27.0 (80.6)	24.6 (76.3)	20.7 (69.3)	16.7 (62.1)	14.2 (57.6)	13.7 (56.7)	14.6 (58.3)	17.1 (62.8)	19.9 (67.8)	22.5 (72.5)	24.8 (76.6)	20.2 (68.4)
Mean daily minimum °C (°F)	14.0 (57.2)	14.1 (57.4)	12.6 (54.7)	9.9 (49.8)	8.2 (46.8)	6.5 (43.7)	6.2 (43.2)	6.4 (43.5)	7.7 (45.9)	8.9 (48.0)	10.7 (51.3)	12.2 (54.0)	9.8 (49.6)
Record low °C (°F)	3.6 (38.5)	4.8 (40.6)	2.2 (36.0)	0.3 (32.5)	−0.3 (31.5)	−2.7 (27.1)	−3.6 (25.5)	−2.3 (27.9)	−0.9 (30.4)	0.1 (32.2)	1.5 (34.7)	2.8 (37.0)	−3.6 (25.5)
Average precipitation mm (inches)	54.7 (2.15)	56.3 (2.22)	46.5 (1.83)	62.4 (2.46)	68.7 (2.70)	71.0 (2.80)	64.3 (2.53)	70.1 (2.76)	77.2 (3.04)	70.5 (2.78)	82.2 (3.24)	80.2 (3.16)	805.8 (31.72)
Average relative humidity (%)	46	47	48	56	64	68	66	61	57	54	52	48	56

== Sport ==
The suburb has an Australian Rules football team, The Scoresby Magpies, competing in the Eastern Football League.

Scoresby Cricket Club, founded in 1879, is also located in the suburb of Scoresby, competing in the Ferntree Gully & District Cricket Association, and play their home games out of Scoresby Recreation Reserve. The club, which is one of the oldest cricket clubs in the world, currently fields numerous senior,junior (boys and girls) and veterans teams, with the 1st XI playing in Alan Bailey Shield.

== See also ==
- Electoral district of Scoresby
