= Bayswater Secondary College =

Coordinates: 37°50′17.4″S 145°15′43.4″E

Bayswater Secondary College (BSC)
- Bayswater, Victoria; Australia

Information
- School type: Public, coeducational, comprehensive, day school
- Motto: H.E.A.R.T
- Established: 1961
- Principal: Elizabeth Swan
- Grades: 7–12
- Enrolment: 213.3
- Campus: Bayswater
- Colours: Blue and yellow
- Website: www.bayswatersc.vic.edu.au

Bayswater Secondary College is a state secondary college located in the suburb of Bayswater in eastern Melbourne, Australia.

== About the school ==
Programs for senior students include Victorian Certificate of Education (VCE), Vocational Education and Training (VET), Victorian Certificate of Applied Learning (VCAL) and participation in School Based Apprenticeships. Programs are run through cooperative arrangements with other schools and provision through TAFE. Performing Arts programs are in place as well as a range of camps, excursions, sporting and other special activities and events.

The school is on the list of students from schools which are under-represented at university, so students are eligible to apply for special consideration for entry.

== Special programs ==
The school was the location of the Department of Education's Leaps and Bounds program.

From 2002–2005 the school participated in a Celebrating Diversity project.
