= Vermont, Victoria =

Vermont
- Suburb
- Interactive map of Vermont
- Coordinates: 37.838°S 145.198°E
- Country: Australia
- State: Victoria
- City: Melbourne
- LGAs: City of Maroondah; City of Whitehorse
- Location: 21 km (13 mi) from Melbourne CBD

Government
  - State electorate: Glen Waverley
  - Federal division: Deakin

Area
  - Total: 4.6 km^{2} (1.8 sq mi)
- Elevation: 150 m (490 ft)

Population
  - Total: 10,993 (SAL 2021)
- Postcode: 3133
Suburbs around Vermont
Nunawading	Mitcham	Ringwood
Forest Hill	Vermont	Ringwood
Vermont South	Vermont South	Wantirna

Vermont (/ˈvɜːrmɒnt/ VUR-mont) is a suburb of Melbourne, Victoria, Australia, 21 km (13 mi) east of Melbourne's Central Business District, located within the Cities of Maroondah and Whitehorse local government areas. Vermont recorded a population of 10,993 at the 2021 census.

Vermont is bordered by Mitcham to the north, Nunawading and Forest Hill to the west, Vermont South to the south and Wantirna and Ringwood to the east.

== History ==
Prior to the first European settlement in Vermont in the 1850s, the landscape in Vermont and surrounding areas was mainly thickly timbered bushland, inhabited by Wurundjeri people of the Kulin Nation. They camped and lived in the gullies and creeks in the area that is now called Bellbird Dell.

The first Europeans to arrive in the area were charcoal burners and woodcutters, who arrived in the 1850s before land sales in what is today Vermont had begun. Land selectors came after this and claimed large areas of land, leased them from the Crown (government) and developed them, so that the settlers would gain freehold titles over the land. The first dwellings on these lands were quite basic, made out of wattle sticks and mud. Large timber cottages were erected soon after.

L. L. Vale Post Office opened on 1 November 1881 and was renamed Vermont in 1889. It was closed between 1895 and 1899. In 1923, a bus route, said to be the first community bus route in the state of Victoria, the 'Mitcham & Vermont Motor Bus Service', began between Vermont and Mitcham. Vermont largely remained an orchard district focused on its school and its church until the 1950s and 60s, when the land was subdivided due to the need for greater housing capacity.

The suburb of Vermont is the location of the Vermont Volunteers Roll of Honour for the First World War. The honour board used to hang in the former Mechanics Institute Hall, which was on the site now occupied by the Scout Hall. Some of the names listed are also included on the Mitcham and Blackburn War Memorials.

=== Heritage listings ===
The following places in Vermont are listed on the Victorian Heritage Register:

- Wunderlich Tile Works (former), at 656 Mitcham Road

== Demographics ==
In the 2016 census the population of Vermont was 10,442, approximately 51.2% female and 48.8% male.

The median/average age of the people in Vermont is 40 years of age.

64.1% of people were born in Australia. The most common countries of birth were China (excludes SARs and Taiwan) 7.5%, England 3.1%, India 2.9%, Malaysia 2.4% and Vietnam 1.5%

66.9% of people only spoke English at home. Other languages spoken at home included Mandarin 9.5%, Cantonese 4.2%, Vietnamese 1.5%, Hindi 1.2% and Sinhalese 1.1%

The most common responses for religion in Vermont (State Suburbs) were No Religion, so described 36.2%, Catholic 19.4%, Anglican 8.8%, Not stated 7.1% and Buddhism 4.3%. In Vermont (State Suburbs), Christianity was the largest religious group reported overall (50.9%) (this figure excludes not stated responses).

== Transport ==
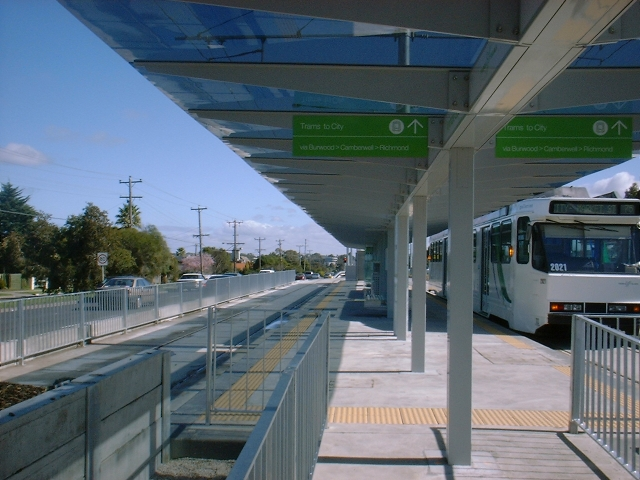
The Vermont South station at the end of the Melbourne tram route 75.

The nearest railway station is Mitcham railway station, located 2 km (1.2 mi) north of Vermont and Heatherdale Station, which is located 1.4 km north of Vermont (from Canterbury Road).

Vermont is serviced by five bus routes. Buses run 7 days of the week.

One of Melbourne's major arterials, Canterbury Road, passes through the centre of Vermont, running east to west. It is intersected by Mitcham and Boronia Roads, which run north and south-east respectively.

== Education ==
Vermont is home to four schools:

- Vermont Secondary College
- Vermont Primary School
- St James' Catholic Primary School
- St Timothy's Catholic Community Primary School

== Sport ==
Australian Rules Football
The suburb has an Australian Rules football team, the Vermont Eagles, competing in the Eastern Football League.

Soccer
The Whitehorse United Soccer Club is located in Vermont South, previously winning the State League 4 East competition in 2017, the club is currently competing in the State league 3 south-east competition.

Futsal
Vermont Futsal Club was founded in 2015 and has competed in the state levels of Victoria and has played previously in State League One. They are currently competing in the State League Three competition at Futsal Oz Brunswick.

Cricket
There is also the Vermont Cricket Club.

== Churches ==
Vermont is also host to a number of churches including:

- Stairway Church
- St. Luke’s Anglican Church

== See also ==
- City of Nunawading – Vermont was previously within this former local government area.
- List of Melbourne suburbs
