= Knoxfield, Victoria =

Knoxfield
- Suburb
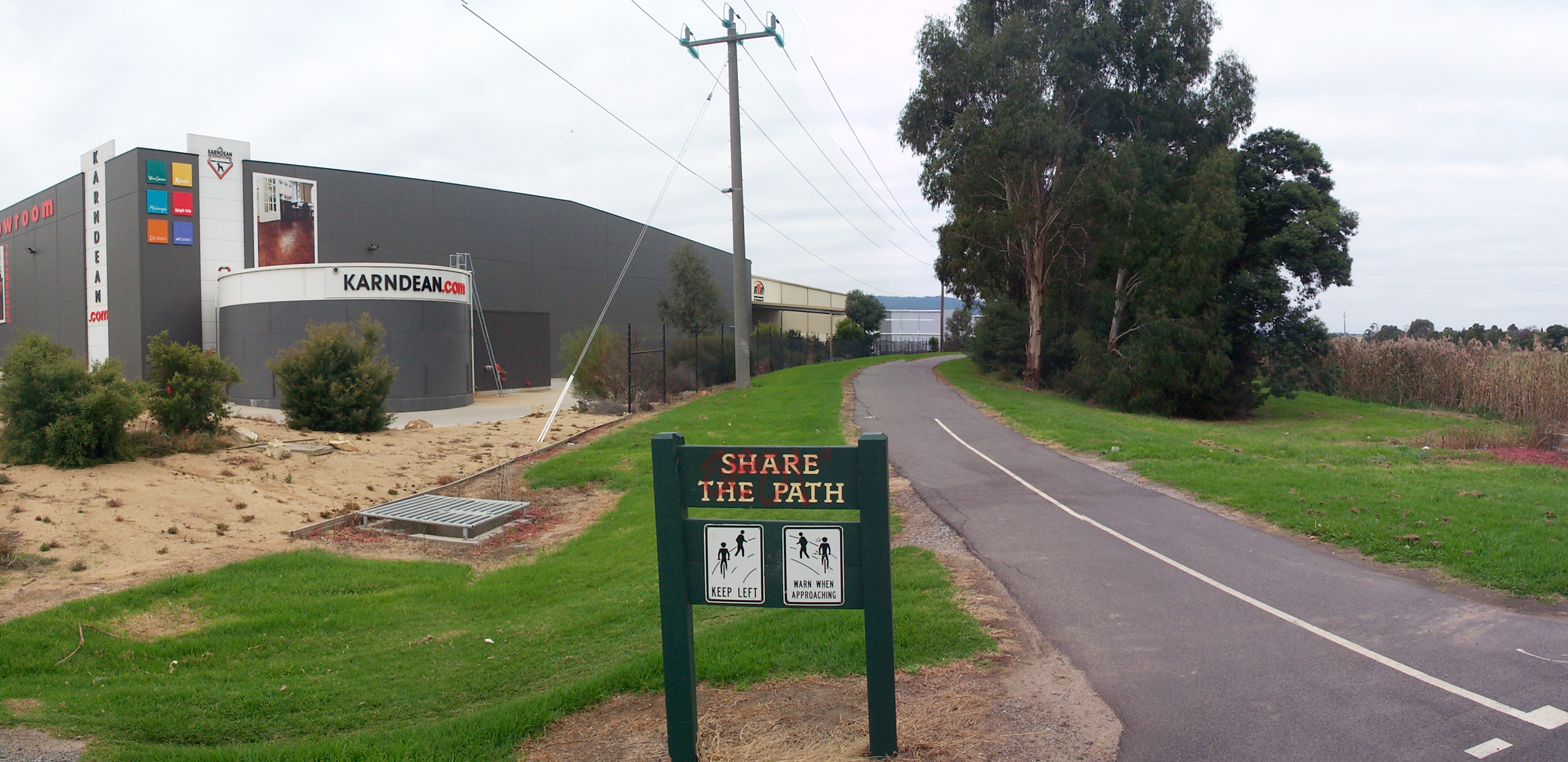
- Ferny Creek Trail, Knoxfield

- Interactive map of Knoxfield
- Coordinates: 37.891°S 145.248°E
- Country: Australia
- State: Victoria
- City: Melbourne
- LGA: City of Knox
- Location: 27 km (17 mi) from Melbourne

Government
  - State electorates: Bayswater; Rowville
  - Federal division: Aston

Area
  - Total: 5.7 km^{2} (2.2 sq mi)

Population
  - Total: 7,645 (2021 census)
  - Density: 1,341/km^{2} (3,474/sq mi)
- Postcode: 3180
Suburbs around Knoxfield
Wantirna South	Wantirna South	Boronia
Scoresby	Knoxfield	Ferntree Gully
Scoresby	Rowville	Rowville

Knoxfield is a suburb in Melbourne, Victoria, Australia, 27 km east of Melbourne's Central Business District, located within the City of Knox local government area. Knoxfield recorded a population of 7,645 at the 2021 census.

== History ==
Upon the inception of the Shire of Knox in 1963, the northeastern part of Scoresby was annexed to become Knoxfield. It was named after Sir George Hodges Knox, former local and state parliamentarian who held the seat of Scoresby from 1945 until his death in 1960.

The first housing development in present-day Knoxfield was subdivided in February 1957 by Laird Smith Estates, creating low-density hobby farms on either side of Kathryn Road (which have all since been re-subdivided into cul-de-sacs and unit developments).

In August 1957, local businessman John Barnes announced an ambitious plan to develop a "new township" between the pre-existing towns of Ferntree Gully and Scoresby. Plans included about 300 homes laid out in an American-style tract housing arrangement.

Barnes was a textile industry executive and councillor for the Fern Tree Gully shire (a predecessor to the City of Knox). In 1958, Barnes controversially introduced a motion to significantly reduce the minimum allotment size in the area, which would allow him to fit more blocks on the estate.

His motion did not get through council, however, it was reintroduced a month later when one of his associates, Leo O'Connor, became councillor and successfully pushed for a reduction of 22%. Barnes knew O'Connor through their shared background as first-class cricketers.

The planning minister began investigating a potential conflict of interest in 1959, coinciding with Barnes' departure from council to spend time abroad. O'Connor would soon develop the Carrington Park Estate, which introduced 600 allotments and remains the largest in the suburb.

During the late 1950s, ASX-listed developer LJ Hooker turned a historic farm at the northeastern corner of Scoresby and Stud Roads into the Rosehill estate. The property had formerly been owned by Rosa Benedikt, who Benedikt Reserve is named after.

The Knoxfield Post Office opened on 31 July 1961 as the area developed.

Suburban sprawl had covered most of the suburb by the early 1980s.

== Demographics ==
In the 2016 Census, there were 7,465 people in Knoxfield. 64.1% of people were born in Australia. The next most common countries of birth were China 5.3%, England 3.6%, India 2.5%, Malaysia 2.5% and Sri Lanka 2.4%. 69.5% of people spoke only English at home. Other languages spoken at home included Mandarin 7.2%, Cantonese 3.7% and Sinhalese 1.9%. The most common responses for religion were No Religion 33.4%, Catholic 18.5% and Anglican 8.8%.

== Education ==
Schools in Knoxfield include Fairhills High School, Knox Park Primary School and Carrington Primary School (formerly Knoxfield Primary School). Knoxfield Primary School merged with Scoresby Heights Primary School in 1994 to create Carrington Primary School.

== Shopping ==
Knoxfield is home to two shopping strips. A medium shopping strip known as the Knoxfield Shops on Ferntree Gully road, and the Anne Road shops on Anne Road.

== Sport ==
The suburb is well known for the Knox Athletics Track and the Gilbert Reserve. Gilbert Reserve is quite large, and regularly holds softball and baseball matches. Knoxfield also has a large BMX track, which is often used for BMX competitions and the R.D. Egan-Lee Reserve which is regularly used by walkers and hosts a soccer club. The track is also open for use by the public. Next to Gilbert Reserve is a local skatepark which was accessible from early 2008.

Also in Knoxfield, there is the Carrington Park Leisure Centre, which is mainly used for gymnastics and fitness. It has also hosted state and national competitions. A family play centre called Big Slide is located in Knoxfield. The Eastern Sports Centre also calls Knoxfield home and hosts futsal, indoor soccer, netball, and cricket.

Golfers play at the course of the Waterford Valley Golf Course on Bunjil Way.

The Knoxfield Knights Cricket Club is based at Carrington Park.

The Knox Athletics Track hosts a variety of sport and events including Little Athletics and the Knox Athletics Club

Gilbert Reserve is home to the Knox & District Softball Association and its related teams as well as The Knox Falcons Baseball Club

Next to Gilbert Park is the Knox Skate and BMX Park which is regularly used by skateboarders, bikers, and scooter riders.

Knoxfield also boasts a large BMX track, which is often used for BMX competitions. The track is also open for use by the public and is regularly attending by BMX and biking enthusiasts of all ages.

The R.D. Egan-Lee Reserve is also in Knoxfield and is home to the Knox City Soccer Club Ltd

== Leisure Centre ==
The Carrington Park Leisure Centre is mainly used for gymnastics and fitness. It has hosted various state and national competitions. It is also the home of the Omega Trampoline Club, Ferntree Gully Basketball Club, Knox Table Tennis Club and Chinese Elderly Citizens Club. It also has facilities such as meeting rooms, a kitchen, disabled access, toilet and car parking, change rooms, trampoline facilities, squash courts and boxing facilities.

Knoxfield is a home for two Scouts groups: 1st Knoxfield group located in Carrington Reserve, and 2nd Knoxfield group located in R.D. Egan-Lee Reserve
