= Bayswater, Victoria =

Bayswater Melbourne, Victoria
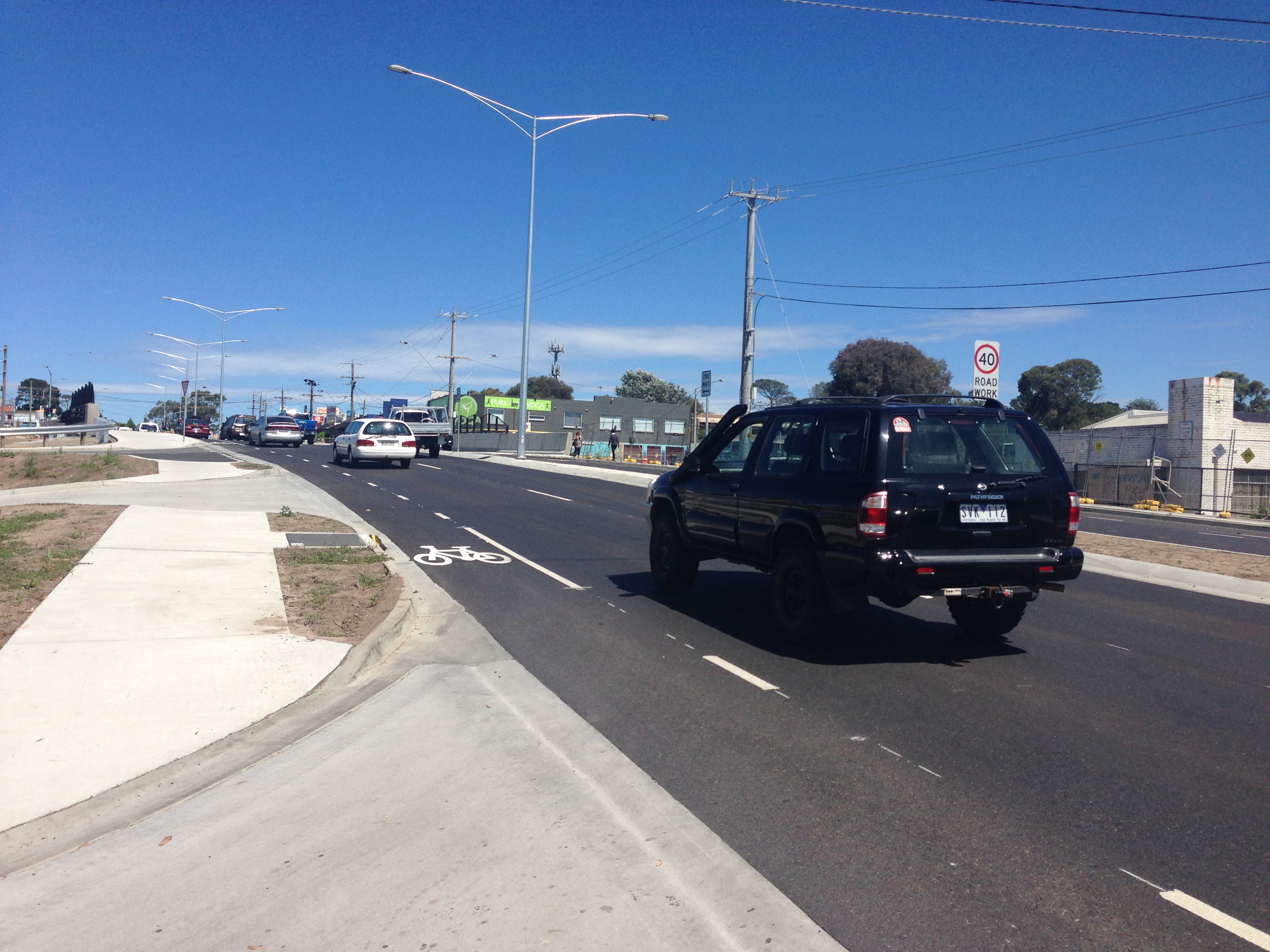
- Mountain Highway, Bayswater

- Coordinates: 37.843°S 145.268°E
- Population: 12,262 (2021 census)
  - Density: 1,552/km^{2} (4,020/sq mi)
- Postcode(s): 3153
- Area: 7.9 km^{2} (3.1 sq mi)
- Location: 28 km (17 mi) E of Melbourne CBD; 6 km (4 mi) S of Croydon
- LGA(s): City of Knox
- County: Mornington
- State electorate(s): Bayswater
- Federal division(s): Aston
Suburbs around Bayswater:
Heathmont	Bayswater North	Bayswater North
Wantirna	Bayswater	Boronia
Wantirna South	Boronia	Boronia

Bayswater is a residential and industrial suburb in Melbourne, Victoria, Australia, 28 km (17 mi) east of Melbourne's Central Business District, located within the City of Knox local government area. Bayswater recorded a population of 12,262 at the 2021 census.

== History ==
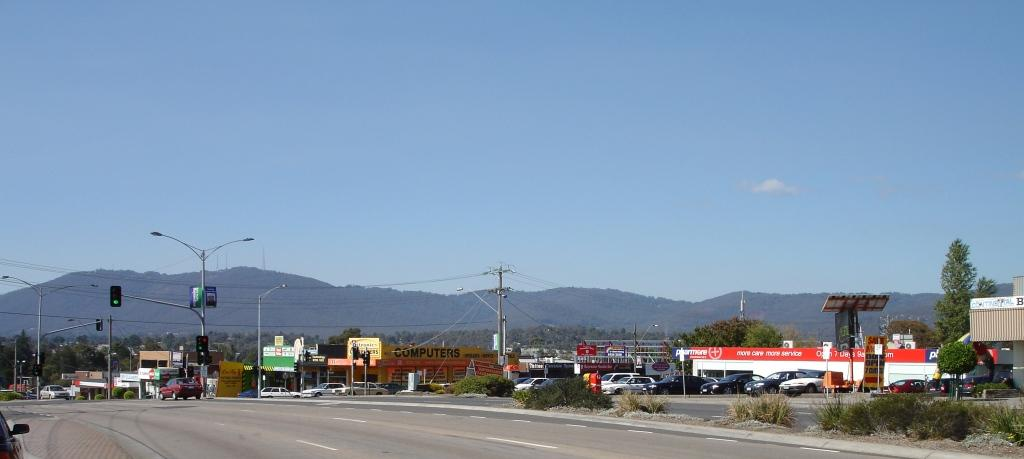
Bayswater, Vic, looking east to Mount Dandenong before station upgrade

The first Post Office in the area was Scoresby North, which opened on 8 May 1882 and renamed Macauley in 1884. When the railway arrived in 1889, a Bayswater office near the station replaced Macauley. In 1998 Bayswater Village (at the shopping centre of that name) office replaced Bayswater.

In the late 1940s, a number of German Templers (just released from the Tatura Internment Camp) settled in Bayswater and Boronia. Part of the Temple Society Australia, they built a Community Centre (1961) in Elizabeth Street and a Retirement Village, as well as Nursing Home Tabulam, in partnership with the Australian German Welfare Society (AGWS).

The Bayswater Wine Cellar is the oldest building in the region, erected in the mid 19th century to service loggers that travelled between the city and the Dandenongs. It was sold to a developer in late 2017.

== Education ==
Schools currently in Bayswater include Our Lady of Lourdes Primary School, Bayswater Primary School, Bayswater South Primary School, Bayswater West Primary School and Bayswater Secondary College (formerly Bayswater High School).

The Bayswater library is located inside the Mountain High Shopping Centre.

== Transport ==
=== Train ===
Bayswater Station is located near the Mountain Highway, and is on the Belgrave line.

=== Bus ===
Bayswater is serviced by the following bus routes:

- 664 Chirnside Park - Knox City via Croydon & Bayswater
- 737 Croydon - Monash University via Boronia & Knox City Shopping Centre & Glen Waverley
- 745 Knox City - Bayswater - Wantirna Primary School
- 745a Knox City - Bayswater
- 745b Bayswater - Boronia Station
- 745c Bayswater - Wantirna Primary School
- 745d Bayswater - Wantirna Primary School via Mountain Highway
- 753 Glen Waverley - Bayswater via Wheelers Hill & Knoxfield & Boronia
- 755 Bayswater - Knox City via Basin & Boronia & Ferntree Gully
- 967 Night bus: Glen Waverley - Burwood Hwy - Bayswater (returns via Bayswater North - Ferntree Gully)

== Demographics ==
Historical population
Year	Population
1911	896
1947	1,694
2001	10,288
2006	10,738
2011	11,240
Source: Bayswater | Victorian Places

In the 2021 census, the following was recorded:

- Top responses for country of birth:
  - Australia: 7,483 (61.0%)
  - China: 664 (5.4%)
  - India: 485 (4.0%)
  - England: 325 (2.7%)
  - Malaysia: 249 (2.0%)
  - Philippines: 225 (1.8%)
- Top responses for religious affiliation:
  - No religion: 5,309 (43.3%)
  - Catholic: 2,011 (16.4%)
  - Anglican: 713 (5.8%)
  - Not stated: 708 (5.8%)
  - Hinduism: 496 (4.0%)
- Top responses for languages used at home:
  - English: 7,978 (65.1%)
  - Mandarin: 805 (6.6%)
  - Cantonese: 495 (4.0%)
  - German: 206 (1.7%)
  - Vietnamese: 157 (1.3%)
  - Sinhalese: 151 (1.2%)

== Sport and recreation ==
Its most well-known reserve is Bayswater Park, where football and cricket is played on the two ovals, as well as netball and tennis, on surrounding courts. The adjacent playground, known by the locals as the 'Train Park', contains a disused steam engine, which has been altered for children to play on.

The suburb has an Australian Rules football team, Bayswater Football Netball Club, known as The Waters, who compete in the Eastern Football League.

The suburb is also the home of the Bayswater Cricket Club, of which they are a member of the Victorian Sub District Cricket Association.

Guy Turner Reserve hosts both the Bayswater Park Cricket Club; known as The Sharks who compete in the Ringwood District Cricket Association during summer and The Bayswater Strikers Soccer Club during winter.

The suburb also had the Bayswater Netball Club that competed in the Mountain District Netball Association located in Ferntree Gully, the club folded due to waning participation in the early 2010’s.

The Knox Little Athletics Centre also hosted the Bayswater Bullets Little Athletics Club which was established in 1968/69 unfortunately a similar fate befitted BBLAC as they disbanded around 2018/19.
