= City of Knox =

Coordinates: 37°53′S 145°13′E

- Local government area
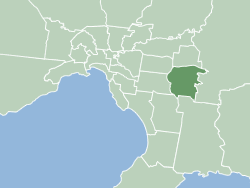
- Map of Melbourne showing City of Knox

- Interactive map of City of Knox
- Country: Australia
- State: Victoria
- Region: Greater Melbourne
- Established: 1963
- Council seat: Wantirna South

Government
  - Mayor: Meagan Baker
  - State electorates: Bayswater; Monbulk; Rowville
  - Federal division: Aston

Area
  - Total: 114 km^{2} (44 sq mi)

Population
  - Total: 159,103 (2021) (42nd)
  - Density: 1,396/km^{2} (3,615/sq mi)
- Website: City of Knox
LGAs around City of Knox
Whitehorse	Maroondah	Yarra Ranges
Monash	City of Knox	Yarra Ranges
Greater Dandenong	Casey	Casey

The City of Knox is a local government area in Victoria, Australia in the eastern suburbs of Melbourne. It is headquartered in the suburb of Wantirna South. It has an area of 114 square kilometres (44.0 sq mi) and recorded a population of 159,103 at the 2021 census. This municipality is one of only a handful that survived the widespread municipal amalgamations that occurred in Victoria in the early 1990s.

== History ==
The City of Knox was named after Sir George Hodges Knox (1885–1960), a former soldier and speaker of the Victorian Legislative Assembly. The City of Knox Crest incorporates his family's motto 'Move and Prosper'.

The area which is now Knox was once part of the Scoresby Riding of the Shire of Berwick. On 23 May 1889, the riding was severed to create the Shire of Fern Tree Gully, which extended as far east as Olinda and Monbulk in the Dandenong Ranges. Post-World War II development in the area closer to Melbourne led to rapid urbanisation and population growth—over 21,000 residents lived in the Knox area by the 1961 Census. A plebiscite to determine local residents' views led to the creation of the Shire of Knox on 9 October 1963, which was proclaimed on 16 November 1963 by the Governor of Victoria. It was declared a City on 4 July 1969.

By the 1986 Census, the area was home to over 100,000 residents. Before the local government reforms of the 1990s, the Cities of Knox and Waverley were the state's two most populous municipalities, with around 125,000 residents each.

The City of Knox was one of the few councils (and one of only four in Melbourne) to survive the statewide amalgamations. On 15 December 1994, its boundaries were extended to add the suburb of Upper Ferntree Gully and part of Lysterfield from the former Shire of Sherbrooke, while it ceded the locality of Lysterfield South to the City of Casey.

The City of Knox before (green) and after (brown) the 1994 reforms

== Wards ==
At present, the City of Knox has nine wards, each electing one councillor for a period of four years.

- Baird ward
- Chandler ward
- Collier ward
- Dinsdale ward
- Dobson ward
- Friberg ward
- Scott ward
- Taylor ward
- Tirhatuan ward

Prior to 1994, the Council had three wards, each of which elected three councillors:

- Bayswater/Wantirna ward
- Boronia ward
- Rowville/Scoresby ward

== Council ==
Knox City Council is composed of nine single-member wards. The mayor and deputy are elected by councillors at an annual meeting in November.

=== Current composition ===
The most recent election was held in October 2024.

The current council, as of 20 November 2026, is:

Ward	Party	Councillor	Notes
Baird	N/A	Vacant	Peter Lockwood resigned 29 October 2026.
Chandler	Independent	Paige Kennett	
Collier	Independent	Chris Duncan	
Dinsdale	Independent Liberal	Robert Williams	
Dobson	Independent	Meagan Baker	Mayor from 19 November 2026
Friberg	Independent Liberal	Parisa Considine	
Scott	Independent	Lisa Cooper	
Taylor	Independent	Susan Pearce	
Tirhatuan	Independent	Glen Atwell	Deputy Mayor from 19 November 2026

The VEC has announced a by-election for Baird ward by postal vote. Ballots will be mailed to eligible voters from Monday 18 January 2027. Ballots to be returned by 6pm Friday 5 February 2027.

== Election results ==
=== 2024 ===
2024 Victorian local elections: Knox
Party	Votes	%	Swing	Seats	Change
Independent	62,340	67.69		6	▼1
Independent Liberal	18,863	20.48		2	▲1
Independent Labor	10,114	10.98		1	Steady
Animal Justice	784	0.85		0	Steady
Formal votes	92,101	96.93			
Informal votes	2,921	3.07			
Total	95,022	100.00		9	Steady
Registered voters / turnout	111,492	85.23			

== Townships and localities ==
At the 2021 census, the city had a population of 159,103, up from 154,110 in the 2016 census.

Population
Locality	2016	2021
Bayswater	11,758	12,262
Boronia	22,195	23,607
Ferntree Gully	26,428	27,398
Knoxfield	7,462	7,645
Lysterfield^	6,663	6,681
Rowville	33,672	33,571
Sassafras^	1,061	970
Scoresby	6,022	6,066
The Basin	4,416	4,497
Upper Ferntree Gully^	3,416	3,417
Wantirna	13,818	14,237
Wantirna South	19,271	20,754

^ - Territory divided with another LGA

== Housing ==
Largest housing developments in Knox (ranked by size)
Rank	Name	Suburb	Blocks	Developer	Established	Prominent streets
1	Rowville Lakes	Rowville	1500	LJ Hooker	1977	Lakeside Blvd, Eildon Pde, Taylors Ln
7	Regency Park	Wantirna South		Stocks & Holdings	1972	
2	Park Ridge	Rowville	1100	Stocks & Holdings	1979	Dandelion Dr, Wentworth Ave, Willow Ave
5	Mountain Gate	Ferntree Gully	950	Overland Development	1959	Mountain Gate Dr, Adele Ave, Ashton Rd
4	Johnson Park / Fairhills	Ferntree Gully	880	Clayton Timber	1959	Lightwood Dr, Manuka Rd, Johnson Dr
6	Carrington Park	Knoxfield	600			
3	Boronia Gardens	Boronia	480	Sunhill Corporation	1959	Lewis Rd, Pentlowe Rd, Rathmullen Rd
8	Knox Park	Wantirna South				
9	Studfield	Wantirna South				
10	Kent Park	Ferntree Gully				

== Population ==
Year	Population
1961	21,281
1966	36,491
1971	56,786
1976	74,456
1981	88,902
1986	104,207
1991	121,982
1996	130,401
2001	141,408
2006	146,740
2016	154,110
2020	165,147

== Religion ==
Religion in the City of Knox (2016)
1. Catholic (21.4%)
2. Anglican (9.40%)
3. Other Christian (19.0%)
4. Buddhism (3.80%)
5. Hinduism (2.60%)
6. Any other religion (2.20%)
7. Non-religious (33.8%)
8. Not stated (8.00%)
- CityLife Church
- Hills Bible Church - Hills Bible Church is a Reformed Baptist congregation
- Knox Community Baptist Church
- St. Jude's Parish, Scoresby
- Knox Presbyterian Church
- Our Saviours Lutheran Church
- Our Lady of Lourdes Catholic Church
- The Church of Jesus Christ of Latter-day Saints
- The Salvation Army
- Truth and Liberation Concern
- St.Thomas Anglican Church Upper Ferntree Gully

== Transport ==
There are a number of bus routes that service the city run by Ventura Bus Lines the city has 4 train stations that are run by Metro Melbourne.

== See also ==
- List of places on the Victorian Heritage Register in the City of Knox
