= Boronia, Victoria =

Boronia
- Suburb
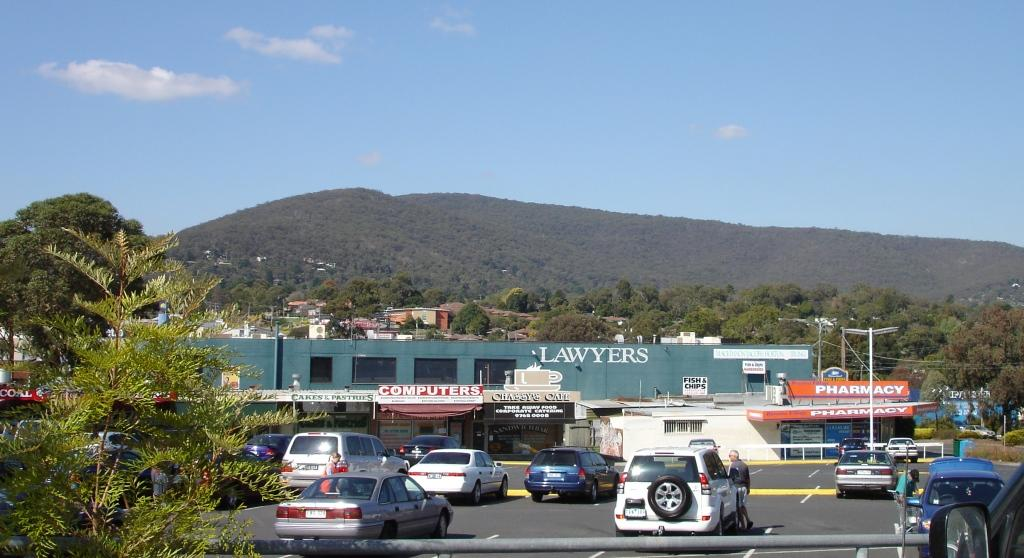
- Looking east towards One-tree Hill

- Interactive map of Boronia
- Coordinates: 37.862°S 145.286°E
- Country: Australia
- State: Victoria
- City: Melbourne
- LGA: City of Knox
- Location: 29 km (18 mi) E of Melbourne CBD

Government
  - State electorate: Bayswater
  - Federal division: Aston

Area
  - Total: 11.3 km^{2} (4.4 sq mi)
- Elevation: 120 m (390 ft)

Population
  - Total: 23,607 (2021 census)
  - Density: 2,089/km^{2} (5,411/sq mi)
- Postcode: 3155
- County: Mornington
Suburbs around Boronia
Bayswater	Bayswater	Bayswater North
Wantirna South	Boronia	The Basin
Knoxfield	Ferntree Gully	Tremont

Boronia is an eastern suburb in Melbourne, Victoria, Australia, 29 kilometres (18 mi) east of Melbourne's Central Business District, located within the City of Knox local government area. Boronia recorded a population of 23,607 at the 2021 census.

The area was originally occupied by the Wurundjeri, Indigenous Australians of the Kulin nation, who spoke variations of the Woiwurrung language group.

== History ==
Prior to European settlement, Boronia and surrounding suburbs were often visited by Aboriginals from the Westernport and Yarra Yarra tribes, hunting during the summer months in the Dandenong Ranges and its foothills. The Wurundjeri people of the Kulin nation are the acknowledged traditional custodians of the land on which Boronia and all of City of Knox is located.

In its early days of European settlement, Boronia was predominantly an orchard, flower growing and farming area.

Boronia was named in 1915 by local Councillor A. E. Chandler (prior to this, Boronia was considered part of Bayswater). Chandler named the suburb Boronia after the plant, boronia, which grew on his property at The Basin. The plant was discovered by Ferdinand von Mueller, an Austrian botanist, who came to Australia during the colonial period.

Boronia railway station opened in 1920, leading to an influx of residents and Boronia Post Office opened on 1 October 1920. A further influx occurred in the 1960s and 1970s.

Boronia's most impressive historical building is Miller Homestead. Originally built in 1888 for John Miller, who was originally from Bayswater, London and the first president of the Shire of Fern Tree Gully (from which the Shire of Knox separated in 1963), later proclaimed the City of Knox on 4th July 1969, and justice of the peace. The original property included stables and horse training facilities and was over 77 acres (310,000 m^{2}) in size. The property was sub-divided in 1971. Miller homestead is classified by the National Trust of Australia (Vic).

Boronia is a tree-lined suburb, with views of the National Park and the city of Melbourne (from the foothills themselves). There are also nature reserves and extensive bike paths/lanes. Boronia includes sections of the Dandenong Ranges foothills and thus possesses many hills itself. It has the beautiful, natural, green backdrop of the hills and the Dandenong Ranges National Park. Knox City Council have endeavoured to protect this green backdrop to Melbourne by developing pro-environment planning guidelines.

For years, Boronia had been split in two by the Belgrave railway line and a bottleneck railway crossing across the two main thoroughfares—Boronia and Dorset Roads. This crossing was the scene of a level crossing accident on 1 June 1952 that took 13 lives and was regarded at the time as one of the worst level crossing tragedies in Victoria's history. In the mid-1990s, VicRoads proposed the reconstruction of the Boronia and Dorset Roads intersection, with the railway line being located underground and a new railway station built in a concrete cutting—ending the separation of the two-halves of the suburb and uniting Boronia. The new tunnel and intersection opened in 1998, with the land which the railway used to occupy (housing the Country Fire Authority, railway station and large playground/park) being converted into a new shopping centre and carpark.

== Community groups ==
There are numerous community and service groups in Boronia, including a Lions Club, a Rotary Club, the Returned and Services League (RSL), YWCA Women's Group, Probus Clubs, Country Women's Association, VIEW Club, Scouts and various church groups that build community and/or provide meals, such as St Paul's Anglican, Boronia Road Uniting Church, Mountain District Vineyard, Boronia Church of Christ and St Joseph's Catholic Church.

The Boronia CFA Fire Station was located where the Boronia Junction and Woolworths supermarket now stands and after becoming both a permanently staffed CFA station along with volunteers it relocated to near the intersection of Scoresby and Boronia Roads where it is now a Fire Rescue Victoria Fire Station.

== Sport and leisure ==
Amenities include a 24-hour gymnasium and Knox Leisureworks, a swimming pool and exercise centre managed by Belgravia Leisure.

The suburb has an Australian Rules football team, the Boronia Hawks, competing in the Eastern Football League. The club is based at Tormore Reserve, which is a cricket ground in the summer months as the home ground of the Boronia Cricket Club.

Other activities include the Boronia Bowls Club, health and fitness centres, netball clubs, an internet cafe, swimming schools/clubs, martial arts schools, a pool club, rehabilitation clinics, bike paths and numerous small parks and playgrounds, Boronia Weightlifting Club and calisthenics schools. Knox Basketball Stadium, which was built in 1975 and slated for decommissioning in 2017, is located in Boronia and is home to Knox Basketball Incorporated. There is also a library and a radio-control car club and raceway in the basketball stadium precinct. A new Dance and Cheerleading school was opened in February 2008.

Boronia Soccer Club is based in the neighbouring suburb of Ferntree Gully. It has teams from U12 - U18. It also has a junior program, which anyone from the age of 6-18 can attend.

The Eastern Raptors play rugby league in NRL Victoria.

== Retail ==
Boronia Junction, a relatively new shopping centre, was completed over 2000–2001. Boronia Junction includes a number of restaurants and a hairdresser. There has been a cinema in Boronia for many decades (although not continuously). Metro Cinemas opened in 2005 (in the former Village Cinemas complex in Dorset Square). Boronia boasts over 11 restaurants, including Indian, Thai, Malaysian, Chinese and Italian cuisine.

The other two shopping precincts in Boronia are Boronia Village and Dorset Square (including Boronia Mall). There is also the Dorset Arcade and Chandler Arcade, both run by the Boronia Chamber of Commerce. Boronia is currently being targeted by Knox City Council for rejuvenation, in consultation with resident interest groups. Major works are intended for the Dorset Square retail and entertainment precinct during 2008.

Dorset Calisthenics College is also located in Boronia.

== Education ==
There are a number of kindergartens located in Boronia. There are also four primary schools in Boronia; Knox Central Primary School, Boronia Heights Primary, Boronia West Primary and St Joseph's Catholic Primary school.

Boronia K-12 College, established in 2012 merged with Boronia Primary School, Allendale Kindergarten and Boronia Heights College on Boronia Primary School's campus. It ran concurrently as the Rangeview Campus, until the Mountview Campus (Boronia Heights College) closed in 2014.

Boronia High School (also known as Tormore Secondary College) closed in 1991.

== Newspaper ==
The offices of the Knox Leader weekly local newspaper (part of the News Corporation group) are located in Boronia. The Boronia and The Basin Community Newspaper (BBCN) is also produced and distributed locally by volunteers and focuses on local stories and history, including feature articles on immigrants' stories and local businesses. The community newspaper is produced on a monthly basis.

== Places of worship ==
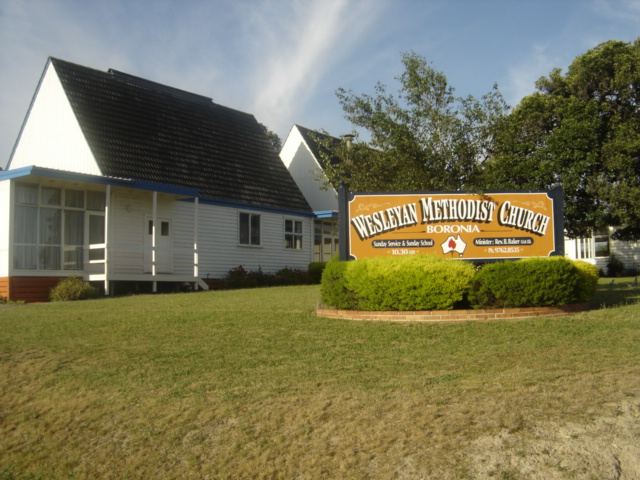
Wesleyan Methodist Church, Boronia

There are a number of groups providing for the local community. These include; St Paul's Anglican Church, Boronia Uniting Church, Boronia Community Church of Christ, The Potter's Church, Vineyard Church, Wesleyan Methodist Church of Boronia (pictured), Jehovah's Witnesses of Bayswater and Boronia, Christadelphian Hall of Boronia, Knox Community Baptist Church, Martin Luther Home for the Aged, Tenrikyo Melbourne Shinyu Church and St Joseph's Catholic Church.

Wadi Street, Boronia, is also the location of the first Templer Community Church Hall in Australia. Built in 1957 entirely by local volunteer Templers, the building, with its unusual belltower and the attached nine-pin bowling alley, has been assessed by the Heritage Council in 2003 as "culturally significant" and placed on the Register of Heritage Victoria.

== In media ==
Boronia was the setting for the 2011 feature film Boronia Boys, in which two local residents attempt to fund an around-the-world trip by scavenging hard rubbish collections in the area.

== Notable former residents ==
- Davey Lane – Guitarist of rock band You Am I, grew up in Boronia.
- Shane Bourne – Comedian, attended Boronia High School. Has also made references to growing up in Boronia before it was a bona fide suburb.
- Boronia was the residence of several members of the folk-pop band The Triangles.
- Tenille Dashwood – Professional wrestler, grew up in Boronia.
- Jane Harper – Author, childhood in Boronia.

== Street names ==
Many of the streets in Boronia follow a botanical theme, such as Sycamore Crescent, Cypress Avenue, Daffodil Road, Iris Crescent, Pine Crescent, Tulip Crescent, Hazelwood Road, Olive Grove and Oak Avenue. Others are named after important local residents; Chandler Road, Rathmullen Road, Dinsdale Road, Kleinert Road.
