= Wantirna South =

- Suburb
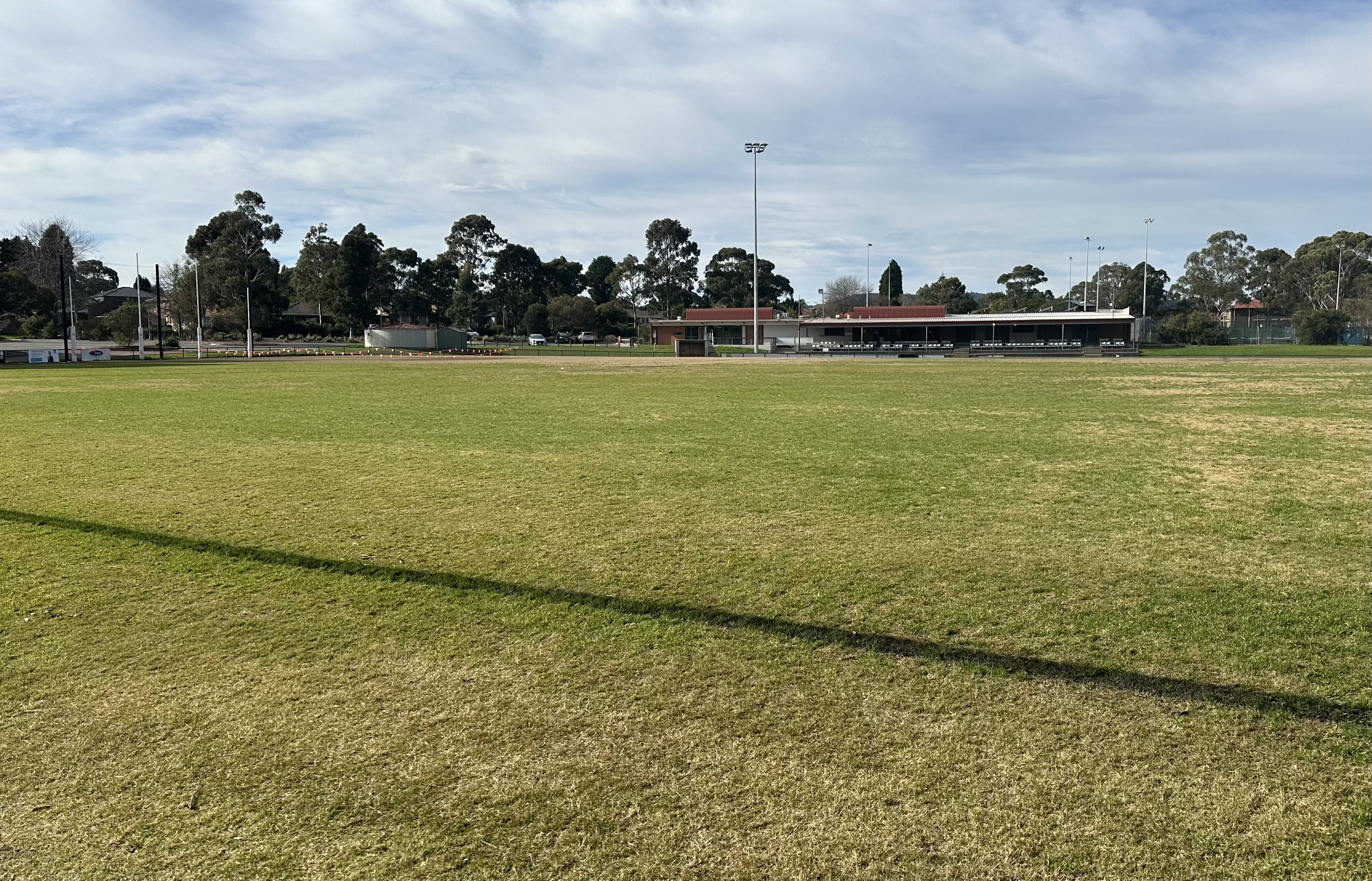
- Knox Gardens Reserve in Wantirna South

- Coordinates: 37.881°S 145.224°E
- Country: Australia
- State: Victoria
- City: Melbourne
- LGA: City of Knox
- Location: 25 km (16 mi) from Melbourne; 11 km (6.8 mi) from Belgrave

Government
  - State electorates: Bayswater; Rowville
  - Federal division: Aston

Area
  - Total: 13.4 km^{2} (5.2 sq mi)

Population
  - Total: 20,754 (2021 census)
  - Density: 1,549/km^{2} (4,011/sq mi)
- Postcode: 3152
Suburbs around Wantirna South
Vermont South	Wantirna	Bayswater
Glen Waverley	Wantirna South	Boronia
Glen Waverley	Scoresby	Knoxfield

Wantirna South is a suburb in Melbourne, Victoria, Australia, 25 km east of Melbourne's Central Business District, located within the City of Knox local government area. Wantirna South recorded a population of 20,754 at the 2021 census. It is a border suburb to the City of Whitehorse and the City of Monash.

== History ==
Wantirna South was mostly orchards until around 80 years ago. Demand for housing grew in the 1920s and Wantirna South and surrounding communities became a new place for housing development. One of the first buildings was Wantirna South Post Office, opened on 1 December 1936, but was renamed Studfield in 1990, being at the Studfield Shopping Centre. Wantirna South Primary School had a significant impact on the growth and housing around the Knox City area.

Several new residential estates have expanded residential dwelling capacity in Wantirna South. New facilities including a lake, shopping centre and various parks and community gardens have been established as a result. Like many suburbs around Melbourne, Knox has seen an increase in dwelling density with the construction of the new apartment complexes which is forecast to continue into the future.

== Facilities ==
Wantirna South serves as the headquarters of the Knox City Council. The Knox City Council's building was burnt down in 1994, and took a few years to be rebuilt.

Another Wantirna South attraction is the Westfield Knox shopping centre, which was first built in the 1970s. It had a major refurbishment in 2002 to make it a more popular area for young people. This area is now known as Knox O-Zone, a popular night spot containing a pub, restaurants, clubs and cinema.

Knox Police Complex is situated on Burwood highway opposite Westfield Knox.

Another important building, across the road from the Knox Council headquarters, was the Rembrandts building. Rembrandts was a ballroom and formal eating place where social life took place, including over-28s and debutant balls from various schools. The building is now currently a part of St. Andrews Christian College.

There is also a skatepark in Wantirna South, which is located near Knox City Shopping Centre.

1st Wantirna South Scout Group has been a part of the community since the early 1950s. Wantirna South is also home to the Knox District Scout Centre, a popular venue for parties.

== Education ==
Schools in Wantirna South include Knox Gardens Primary School, Knox Central Primary School, Knox Park Primary School, St Andrews Christian College, Waverley Christian College, Wantirna South Primary School and The Knox School. A campus of the Swinburne University of Technology is also located in Wantirna South.

== Sport ==
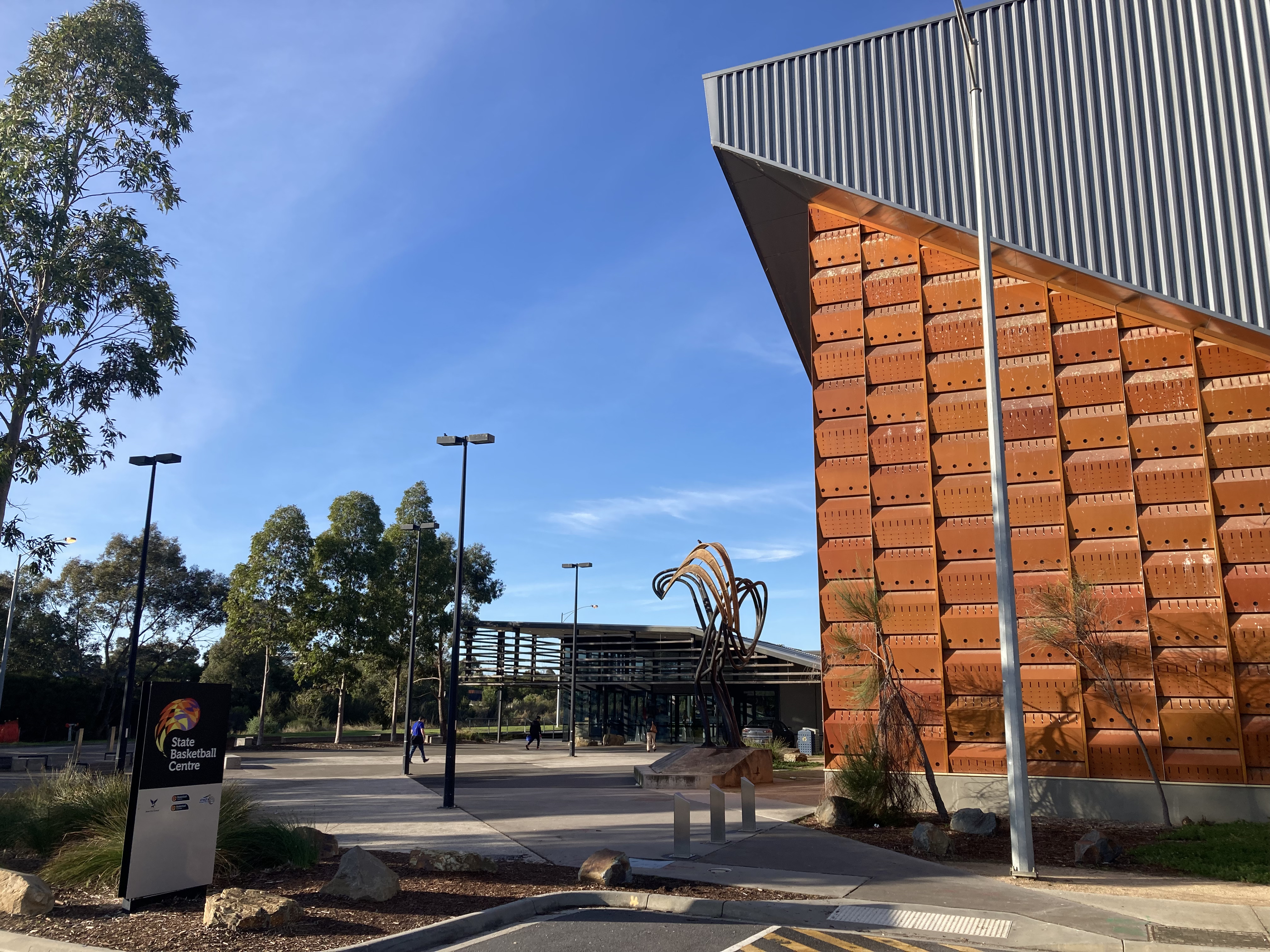
The State Basketball Centre in Wantirna South

The Wantirna WASPS Basketball Club is the local basketball club. WASPS were established in 1988, and with over 70 boys and girls teams has grown to be the largest club competing in the Knox Basketball Association.

The Wantirna South Football Club, the Devils, competes in the Eastern Football League. The Knox Football Club, the Falcons, is situated next to Knox Gardens Primary School and also competes in the Eastern Football League.

The Knox City Tennis Club is located in the heart of Wantirna South and backs onto the well-known flood basin.

The Knox Basketball Club are based in the suburb at the State Basketball Centre, which is also the training and corporate home to the South East Melbourne Phoenix of the Australian NBL. The South East Melbourne Phoenix also play select home games at the State Basketball Centre each NBL season.
