= Endeavour Hills =

- Suburb
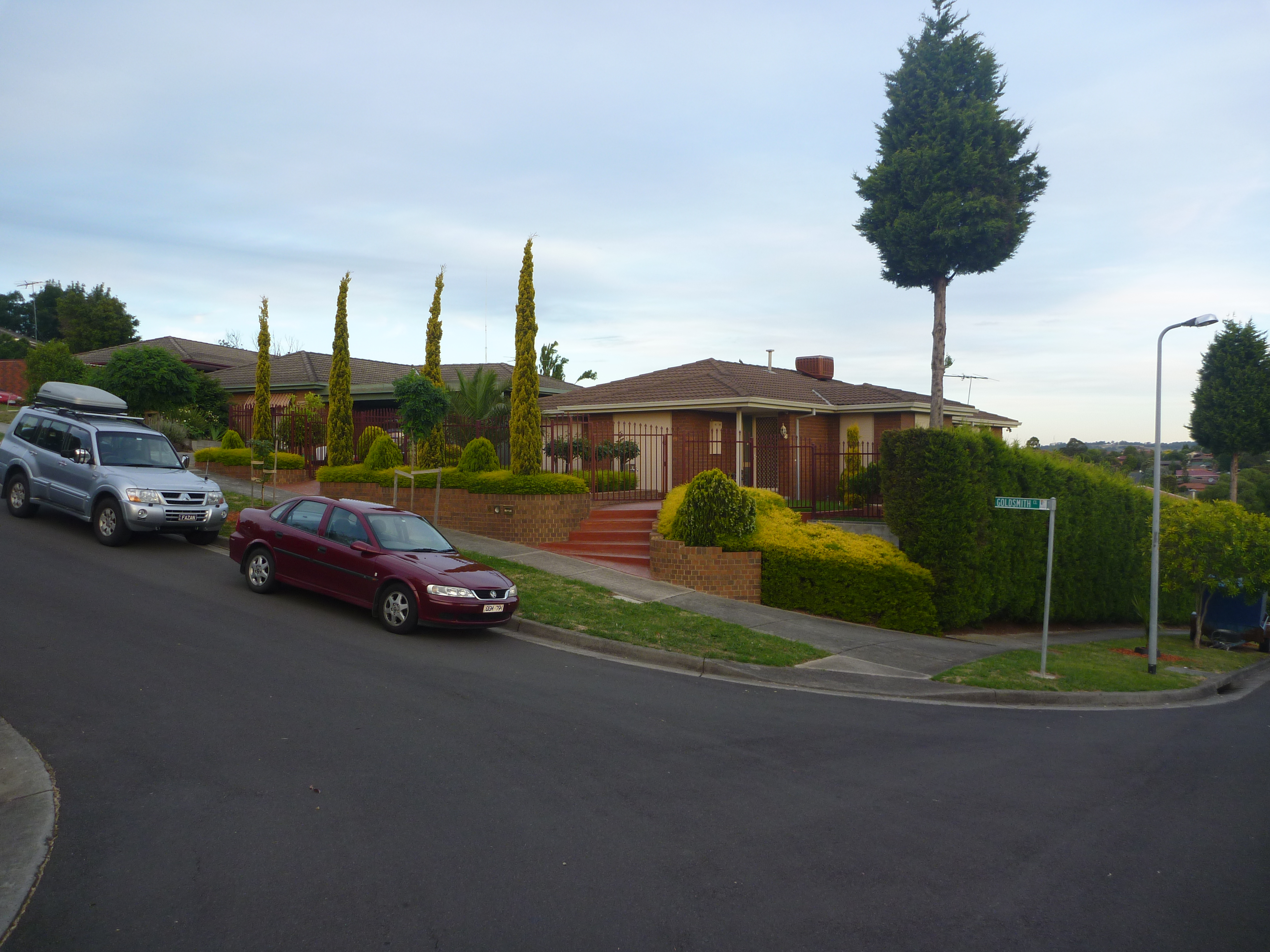
- Houses in Endeavour Hills

- Interactive map of Endeavour Hills
- Coordinates: 37.9690°S 145.2558°E
- Country: Australia
- State: Victoria
- City: Melbourne
- LGA: City of Casey
- Location: 31 km (19 mi) from Melbourne; 6 km (3.7 mi) from Dandenong
- Established: 1970

Government
  - State electorates: Dandenong; Narre Warren North
  - Federal division: Bruce

Area
  - Total: 15.7 km^{2} (6.1 sq mi)

Population
  - Total: 24,455 (2021 census)
  - Density: 1,558/km^{2} (4,034/sq mi)
- Postcode: 3802
Suburbs around Endeavour Hills
Rowville	Lysterfield South	Lysterfield
Dandenong North	Endeavour Hills	Narre Warren North
Doveton	Eumemmerring	Hallam

Endeavour Hills is a suburb in Melbourne, Victoria, Australia, 31 km (19 mi) south-east of Melbourne's Central Business District, located within the City of Casey local government area. Endeavour Hills recorded a population of 24,455 at the 2021 census.

Endeavour Hills is bordered by the Monash Freeway and Dandenong Creek to the west, Police Road and Churchill Park Drive to the north, Hallam North Road to the east, and Eumemmerring Creek to the south.

== History ==
The land in the area was home firstly to the Aboriginal people and was later settled by Europeans, who came after the 1830s. They mainly used the land for farming and cattle runs.

The earliest landowner of the area was Thomas Herbert Power who had owned the area from the 1850s extending from Power Road, almost to Berwick and north to Heatherton Road. The suburb was named after Captain James Cook's ship, The Endeavour. Other suggested names at the time included Pine Hill and Piney Ridge, due to the number of pine trees in the area. In 1970, the name 'Endeavour Hills' was coined in honour of the two hundredth anniversary of Captain James Cook's arrival in Botany Bay. The estate was officially opened in 1974 under this name.

In 1974, houses, shops, schools and parks began to be established.

The suburb as known today began with the development of a small housing estate named Endeavour Hills. The estate was designed to have its own community services for every-day living, such as its own leisure centre, shopping centre, library, medical centres, child care centres, kindergartens, public and private schools. The suburb was created with plenty of parkland, bike paths, and safe playing areas for children. The developers of Endeavour Hills aimed to attract people by offering families a neighbourly and spacious place to live. The catch phrase was 'a better place to live' where everything looked green and the land looked like a sort of paradise.

The original estate sales office was located in what is now the Joseph Banks Medical Centre. A statue of explorer James Cook stood outside; new streets were named around the explorer James Cook, his ship the Endeavour, and fellow sailors and explorers. These include James Cook Drive, Thomas Mitchell Drive, Matthew Flinders Avenue, John Fawkner Drive, Arthur Phillip Drive and others.

Endeavour Hills Post Office opened on 5 September 1983.

On 24 September 2014, an 18-year-old man, Numan Haider, was shot and killed by police outside Endeavour Hills police station after Haider attacked the police officers. In May 2023, local resident Monique Lezsak was stabbed to death. Her daughter was also injured in the incident.

=== Heritage listing ===
The following place in Endeavour Hills is listed on the Victorian Heritage Register:

- Nerre Nerre Warren, the former police paddock complex on Churchill Park Drive, now part of the Dandenong Police Paddocks Reserve

== Suburb profile ==
Endeavour Hills is a hilly and leafy residential suburb with many parks, gardens and a variety of trees and birdlife. It has underground utilities (electricity, gas, telecommunications, water) street lighting, wide roads, footpaths and an abundance of native trees have been planted on naturestrips.

Many houses have been built on steep land blocks and have distant views of the surrounding suburbs, some as far away as Frankston, Chadstone, Pakenham, Port Philip Bay and in some cases the CBD.

Endeavour Hills consists of modern low-density residential housing – single, double and triple level brick houses – built on 1/4, 1/2, 1 or more acre blocks. A meagre of ground-level townhouses and units exist. There are no high-rise buildings and no industries. There are a total of 8,551 dwellings with average people per household of 03.

Endeavour Hills Police Station is located on Heatherton Road, near the main shopping centre. The Police Station is no longer open for 24 hours.

== Demographics ==
In the 2016 Census, 46.8% of people were born in Australia. The next most common countries of birth were Sri Lanka 5.5%, India 4.5%, China 2.7%, Afghanistan 2.6% and England 1.8%. 44.7% of people spoke only English at home. Other languages spoken at home included Mandarin 3.9%, Sinhalese 3.4%, Arabic 3.1%, Greek 2.6% and Serbian 2.5%. The most common responses for religion were Catholic 26.2%, No Religion 18.3% and Islam 9.8%.

== Facilities ==
The main shopping area is Endeavour Hills Shopping Centre, located on the corner of Matthew Flinders Avenue and Heatherton Road. There are 86 retail stores all undercover, including three large supermarkets and a Kmart Discount department store. The shopping centre consists of a multi-level carpark with over 1800 car park spaces.

Around this area is The Endeavour Hills Leisure and Function Centre with a basketball court, Health & Wellness Club.

The Endeavour Hills Library (part of the Casey-Cardinia Library Corporation) and the Endeavour Hills Police Station are also within this area. The library has recently been expanded.

Endeavour Hills Uniting Care Neighbourhood Centre is located next to the Library complex close to the shopping centre. The Neighbourhood Centre is a not for profit organisation under the auspices of the Uniting Church. It is an adult learning centre that delivers a range of classes and support services. There is also a State Government Department of Human Services and The Rotary Club of Endeavour Hills.

Endeavour Hills has many medical centres, including a variety of specialist services, dental, pathology and diagnostic radiology.

A 24-hour ambulance station is located in Endeavour Hills.

== Recreation ==
Endeavour Hills has its own skate park located just outside the Leisure Centre. There are also tennis courts at Sydney Parkinson Reserve (Endeavour Hills Tennis Club. 8 clay carpet courts with 4 under lights) and also Tennis Courts on Matthew Flinders Avenue (St.Paul's), Football/Cricket Oval at James Cook Drive and the suburb boasts an abundance of parks.

Golfers play at the Churchill Park Golf Club on Churchill Park Drive.

The Casuarina Forest is located within James Alexander Reserve, and the reserve has lookouts and views as far as Port Phillip Bay. In the original plans for Endeavour Hills, the Casuarina Forest was to be cleared to make way for housing. However, a campaign run by locals was successful in ensuring that the forest was preserved.

Endeavour Hills is a short walk to Lysterfield Park, Churchill National Park, the Dandenong Police Paddocks Reserve, and Eumemmerring Creek.

== Education ==
The first school, James Cook Primary School, opened in 1979.

There are two high schools in Endeavour Hills: a campus of Maranatha Christian School and Gleneagles Secondary College, (formerly a campus of Eumemmerring College). Endeavour Hills Secondary College, another former campus of Eumemmerring College, was closed at the end of 2012.

The primary schools in the area are: Chalcot Lodge Primary School, James Cook Primary School, Mossgiel Park Primary School, Southern Cross Primary School, St. Paul Apostle North, St. Paul Apostle South and Thomas Mitchell Primary School.

The kindergartens in the area are: Allara Kindergarten, Chalcot Lodge Kindergarten, David Collins Kindergarten, Hartley Ridge Kindergarten, James Cook Kindergarten, Reema Kindergarten. FiRST Early Learning Centre and Kindergarten, Rose Garden, Endeavour Hills Early Learning Centre.

== Transport ==
There are no train stations in Endeavour Hills. The nearest train line to Endeavour Hills is the Pakenham line, which serves many of the City of Casey suburbs including Berwick, Hallam, Hampton Park and Narre Warren. The suburb is situated closest to Hallam station, although many residents prefer to go to Dandenong (located on the Pakenham and Cranbourne lines) .

There are also five bus routes servicing the area including route 842

== Sport ==
Soccer is popular with three clubs located in the suburb; Dandenong City Soccer Club who play in the top tier of the Victorian Premier League, Endeavour United SC and Endeavour Hills Fire SC both fielding teams in the division 4 and division 5 of the Victorian State League respectively.

Also common is Australian Rules, represented in the seniors by the Endeavour Hills Falcons, and in the juniors by rivals the Endeavour North Hawks (formerly Mossgiel Park) and the Endeavour Hills Eagles.

Endeavour Hills also plays cricket in the Victorian Sub District Cricket Association. Their home ground is at Sydney Pargeter Reserve just off Power Road.

Endeavour Hills are also represented in Victorian Rugby Union, and also the Casey Spartans in Gridiron Victoria.

== Places of worship ==
- Australian Christian Church
- Australian Christian Channel
- Assemblies of God
- Calvary Christian Chapel
- Catholic Archdiocese (Endeavour Hills)
- Church of Christ
- Grace Community Bible Church
- First Romanian Baptist Church
- St. Andrew's Vineyard Church
- St. Matthew's Community Church
- St. Paul Apostle Catholic Church
- South Eastern Christian Centre
- Uniting Church
- Holy Family Church

== Notable people ==
- Chris Ciriello, field hockey player
- Jay Kennedy Harris, Australian rules footballer
- Paulo Retre, Footballer for Sydney FC

== See also ==
- City of Berwick – Endeavour Hills was previously within this former local government area.
