= Electoral results for the district of Narre Warren North =

Victoria, Australia, district election results

This is a list of electoral results for the Electoral district of Narre Warren North in Victorian state elections.

== Members for Narre Warren North ==
Member	Party	Term
Luke Donnellan	Labor	2002–2022
Belinda Wilson	Labor	2022–present

== Election results ==
=== Elections in the 2020s ===
2022 Victorian state election: Narre Warren North
Party	Candidate	Votes	%	±%
Labor	Belinda Wilson	19,350	46.8	−4.4
Liberal	Timothy Dragan	11,291	27.3	−8.1
Greens	Laura McLean	2,809	6.8	+0.6
Family First	Christine Elkins	1,530	3.7	+3.7
Liberal Democrats	Stephen Matulec	1,325	3.2	+3.2
Freedom	Craig Parker	1,218	2.9	+2.9
Democratic Labour	Andrew Zmegac	1,191	2.9	−1.1
Animal Justice	Sheree Gardner	978	2.4	+2.4
Independent	Stephen Capon	906	2.2	+2.2
Shooters, Fishers, Farmers	Monique Ruyter	772	1.9	+1.9
Total formal votes		41,370	92.0	−1.1
Informal votes		3,602	8.0	+1.1
Turnout		44,972	86.7	−1.7
Two-party-preferred result
Labor	Belinda Wilson	24,302	58.7	−1.7
Liberal	Timothy Dragan	17,068	41.3	+1.7
Labor hold		Swing	−1.7	

=== Elections in the 2010s ===
2018 Victorian state election: Narre Warren North
Party	Candidate	Votes	%	±%
Labor	Luke Donnellan	18,790	50.12	+3.51
Liberal	Vikki Fitzgerald	13,474	35.94	−3.79
Greens	Stefanie Bauer	2,313	6.17	+0.51
Democratic Labour	Sami Greiss	1,680	4.48	+3.07
Transport Matters	Zeeshan Mahmood	1,234	3.29	+3.29
Total formal votes		37,491	93.35	+0.10
Informal votes		2,670	6.65	−0.10
Turnout		40,161	89.80	−2.81
Two-party-preferred result
Labor	Luke Donnellan	22,426	59.76	+5.19
Liberal	Vikki Fitzgerald	15,103	40.24	−5.19
Labor hold		Swing	+5.19	

2014 Victorian state election: Narre Warren North
Party	Candidate	Votes	%	±%
Labor	Luke Donnellan	17,421	46.6	+2.3
Liberal	Amanda Stapledon	14,849	39.7	+0.1
Greens	Karen Jones	2,114	5.7	−1.3
Christians	Mery Mekhail	1,012	2.7	+2.7
Rise Up Australia	Robert George White	902	2.4	+2.4
Independent	Wasim Qureshi	550	1.5	+1.5
Democratic Labour	Chris Blackburn	527	1.4	−1.3
Total formal votes		37,375	93.3	−0.4
Informal votes		2,706	6.8	+0.4
Turnout		40,081	92.6	−0.3
Two-party-preferred result
Labor	Luke Donnellan	20,392	54.6	−0.2
Liberal	Amanda Stapledon	16,981	45.4	+0.2
Labor hold		Swing	−0.2	

2010 Victorian state election: Narre Warren North
Party	Candidate	Votes	%	±%
Labor	Luke Donnellan	15,043	42.52	−9.79
Liberal	Michelle Frazer	14,743	41.67	+8.03
Greens	Michael Schilling	2,443	6.91	−0.04
Family First	Lissa McKenzie	1,222	3.45	−2.53
Democratic Labor	Carmen Sant	1,094	3.09	+3.09
Independent	Paul Richardson	604	1.71	+1.71
Independent	Taimour Hassan	228	0.64	+0.64
Total formal votes		35,377	93.83	−1.65
Informal votes		2,325	6.17	+1.65
Turnout		37,702	93.78	+0.13
Two-party-preferred result
Labor	Luke Donnellan	18,828	53.01	−6.22
Liberal	Michelle Frazer	16,692	46.99	+6.22
Labor hold		Swing	−6.22	

=== Elections in the 2000s ===
2006 Victorian state election: Narre Warren North
Party	Candidate	Votes	%	±%
Labor	Luke Donnellan	17,412	52.3	−2.8
Liberal	Mick Morland	11,197	33.6	−3.7
Greens	Bree Taylor	2,312	6.9	−0.7
Family First	Peterine Smulders	1,990	6.0	+6.0
People Power	Ian Murphy	374	1.1	+1.1
Total formal votes		33,285	95.5	−1.1
Informal votes		1,575	4.5	+1.1
Turnout		34,860	93.7	
Two-party-preferred result
Labor	Luke Donnellan	19,716	59.2	−0.5
Liberal	Mick Morland	13,569	40.8	+0.5
Labor hold		Swing	−0.5	

2002 Victorian state election: Narre Warren North
Party	Candidate	Votes	%	±%
Labor	Luke Donnellan	17,537	55.1	+12.8
Liberal	Maree Luckins	11,874	37.3	−16.8
Greens	Glen Haywood	2,406	7.6	+7.6
Total formal votes		31,817	96.6	−0.4
Informal votes		1,134	3.4	+0.4
Turnout		32,951	94.0	
Two-party-preferred result
Labor	Luke Donnellan	18,991	59.7	+14.8
Liberal	Maree Luckins	12,822	40.3	−14.8
Labor gain from Liberal		Swing	+14.8	
