= Harkaway =

Harkaway may refer to:

- Harkaway, Victoria, a suburb of Melbourne, Australia
- Harkaway, Ontario, in Canada

== People with the surname ==
- Nick Harkaway (born 1972), English novelist
