= Claire Baxter =

Australian cyclist

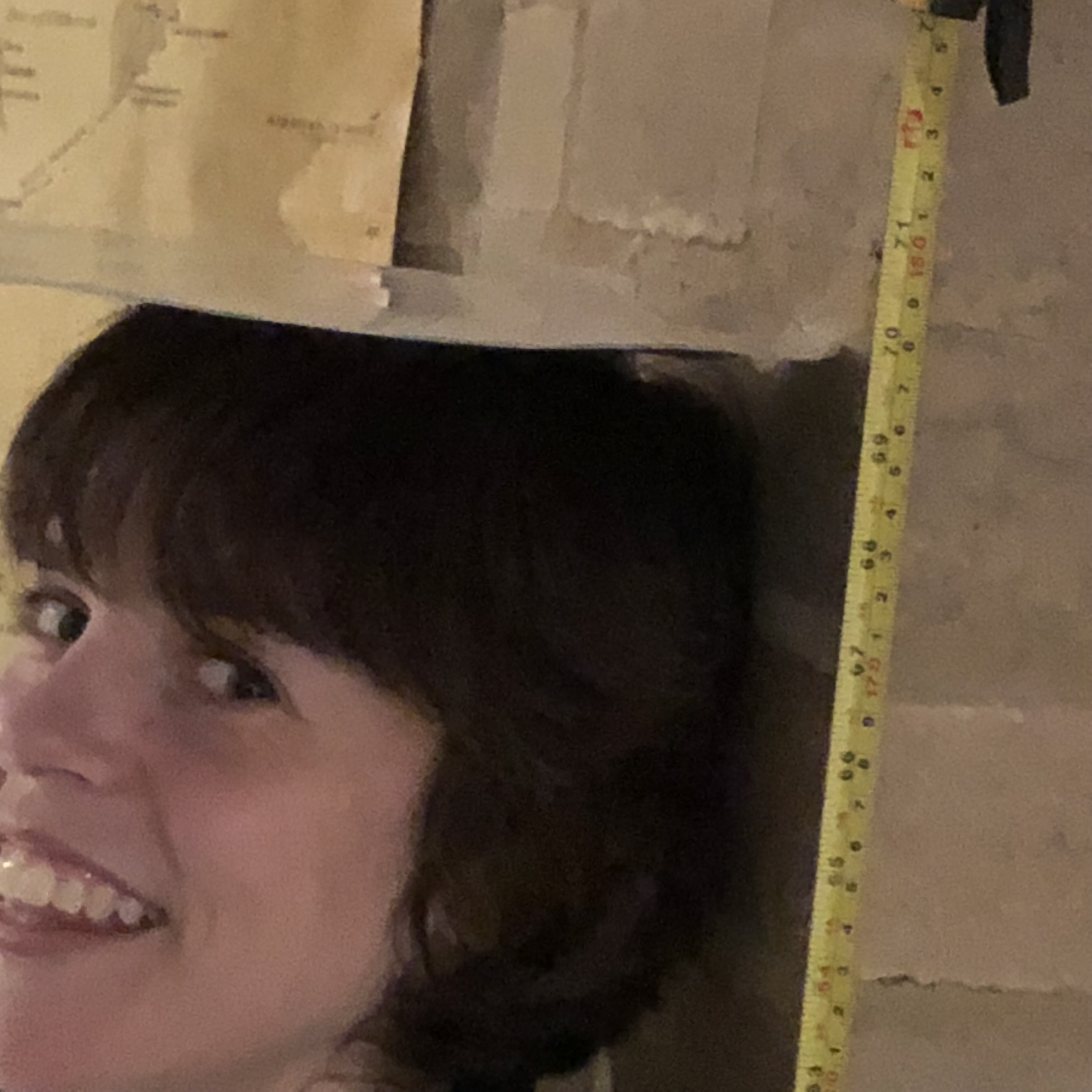

Personal information
- Born: 24 January 1982 (age 44)
- Height: 1.78 m (5 ft 10 in)
- Weight: 65 kg (143 lb; 10.2 st)

Cycling career
- Sport: Cycling
- Current team: Retired
- Disciplines: Road and Mountain Bike

Professional teams
- 2005: Saccarelli EMU Marsciano
- 2006: Lotto–Belisol Ladiesteam

Claire Baxter (born 24 January 1982 in Australia) was a professional racing cyclist, competing in both road and mountain bike racing events. She retired in late 2006 after competing in the 2006 Commonwealth Games.

== 2006 Commonwealth Games ==
Baxter qualified for the Women's cross country mountain biking event held in Lysterfield Park, in Victoria, Australia, by winning the first Commonwealth Games Selection Race in a time of 1.38.41. The event comprised five laps of the Commonwealth Games course at Lysterfield Park. During the second lap of the event, Baxter suffered technical difficulties, and was required to run with her bicycle to a technical zone to gain assistance. The repairs took several minutes, and this delay resulted in her finishing in 11th place.

== Team membership ==
In 2006, Baxter was a member of the Australian team for the 2006 Commonwealth Games. She was also a member of the Lotto–Belisol Ladiesteam, a professional women's cycling team based in Belgium, and Saccarelli EMU Marsciano, based in Italy. Prior to 2006, she primarily represented Saccarelli EMU Marsciano and the Hawthorn Citizens Youth Club. She also represented Kathy Watt's Personal Training, Mascot Cycles, and Le Tour Cycles.

== Palmarès ==
1998
National Sub-Junior Champion, MTB

1999
National Junior Champion, MTB

2000
National Junior Champion, MTB
7th Junior World Championships, Spain, MTB
3rd Junior World Cup, Italy, MTB

2002
Oceania Champion, MTB

2003
Australian University Games, Women's Road Champion

2004
Australian University Games, Women's Road Champion
2nd National Road Cycling Championships (91km) (Yandina, Australia)
2nd New South Wales State Road Championships (99km) (Australia)
Mount Alexander Shire 2 Day Tour

2nd 2nd stage
2nd 3rd stage
2nd 4th stage
3rd General Classification

3rd Victorian IRTT Championships
3rd Victorian Road Championships
De Bortoli 2 Day Tour (Victoria)

4th 1st stage
4th 2nd stage
4th 3rd stage
4th General Classification

5th Elite Cross country mountain bike Oceania Championships (New Zealand)
6th 2004 Victorian Women's Road Series

2005
1st National Cross country Mountain Bike Series (Australia)
1st Mitta to Mount Beauty Mountain Bike Race (55km) (Victoria)
2nd stage 2 Victorian Open Women's Criterium (Victoria)
3rd National Cross Country Mountain Bike Series (Australia)
3rd Mount William Grampians 80 km Classic (Ararat – Moyston, Victoria)
De Bortoli Tour of Yarra Valley, Victoria

2nd 2nd stage
2nd 3rd stage
2nd General Classification

17th Overall Trust House Women's Tour (New Zealand)
UCI New Zealand World Cup

28th Overall in the Road Race

31st UCI Road World Cup Geelong (Australia)
32nd Overall Girodi San Marino

2006 (Lotto–Belisol Ladiesteam)
2nd Australian Cross country Mountain Bike Championships (Mount Beauty, Australia)
Victorian Open Road Championships (Mansfield)

3rd Criterium
2nd Road race
2nd Time Trial
Sprint Queen

4th National Cross country Mountain Bike Series #4 (Mount Buller, Australia)
11th Women's Individual Cross country Mountain Bike event, Commonwealth Games (Victoria)
