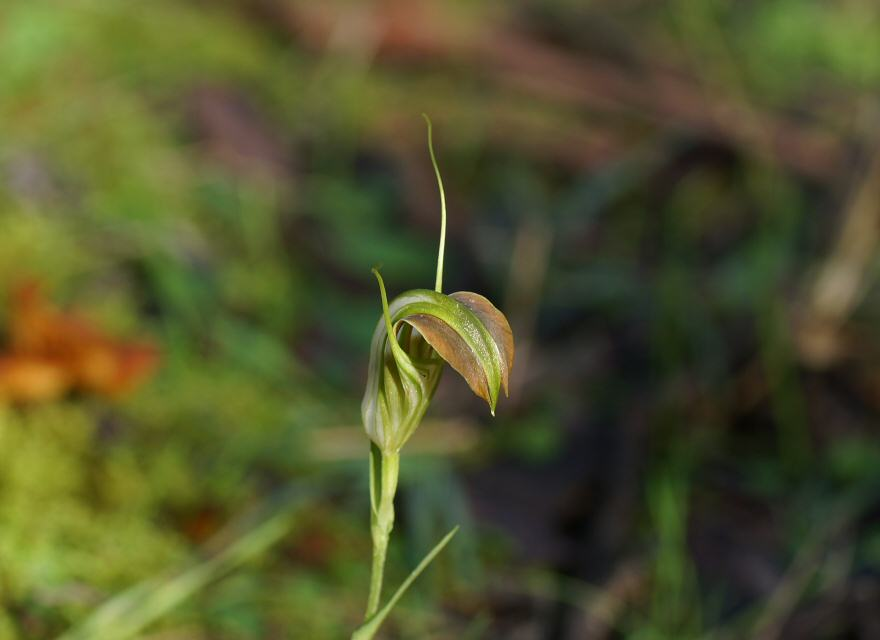
- In Belgrave South

Scientific classification
- Kingdom: Plantae
- Clade: Embryophytes
- Clade: Tracheophytes
- Clade: Spermatophytes
- Clade: Angiosperms
- Clade: Monocots
- Order: Asparagales
- Family: Orchidaceae
- Subfamily: Orchidoideae
- Tribe: Cranichideae
- Genus: Pterostylis
- Species: P. grandiflora

Binomial name
- Pterostylis grandiflora R.Br.

Synonyms
- Diplodium grandiflorum (R.Br.) D.L.Jones & M.A.Clem.

= Pterostylis grandiflora =

Cobra greenhood

Species of orchid

Pterostylis grandiflora, commonly known as cobra greenhood or superb greenhood, is a species of orchid endemic to south-eastern Australia. As with similar orchids, the flowering plants differ from those which are not flowering. The non-flowering plants have a rosette of leaves but the flowering plants lack a rosette and have a single flower with leaves on the flowering spike. This greenhood has a green and white, striped flower with deep red-brown markings especially on its "galea", and a sharply pointed dorsal sepal.

== Description ==
Pterostylis grandiflora is a terrestrial, perennial, deciduous, herb with an underground tuber and when not flowering, a rosette of four to nine egg-shaped leaves. Each leaf is 4–20 mm long and 3–10 mm wide. Flowering plants have a single flower 27–35 mm long and 17–23 mm wide borne on a spike 150–150 mm high with four to nine stem leaves wrapped around it. The flowers are white with green and deep red-brown stripes and markings. The dorsal sepal and petals are fused, forming a hood or "galea" over the column. The dorsal sepal curves forward with a thread-like tip 3–5 mm long. The lateral sepals are erect and held closely against the galea and there is a broad, flat, platform-like protruding sinus between their bases. The labellum is 17–20 mm long, about 3 mm wide and reddish-brown and protrudes above the sinus. Flowering occurs from May to August.

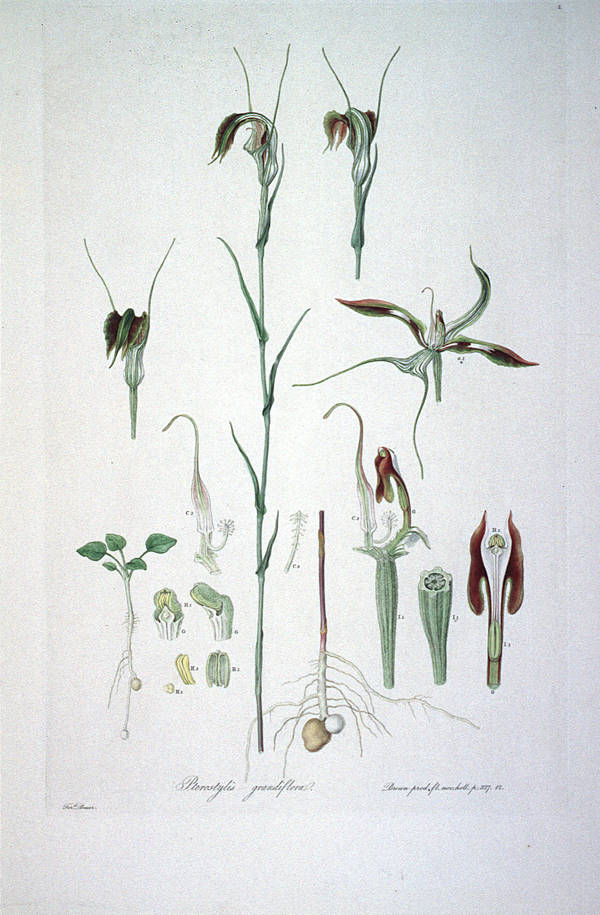
P. grandiflora 1810 illustration

== Taxonomy and naming ==
Pterostylis grandiflora was first formally described in 1810 by Robert Brown and the description was published in the Prodromus Florae Novae Hollandiae et Insulae Van Diemen. The specific epithet (grandiflora) is derived from the Latin words grandis meaning "large" and flos, genitive floris meaning flower".

== Distribution and habitat ==
Cobra greenhood grows in moist shady places in forest on the coast and tablelands of southern Queensland, New South Wales, Victoria and Tasmania.

== Conservation ==
Pterostylis grandiflora is classified as "rare" under the Tasmanian Government Threatened Species Protection Act 1995.

== Use in horticulture ==
Although easier to grow than many other greenhoods, the superb greenhood is mainly only grown by orchid enthusiasts. It must be kept dry in the dormant stage and kept moist in 50% sunlight during the growth and flowering stage.
