= Percy Hordern (footballer) =

Australian rules footballer (1884–1967)

Personal information
- Full name: Edward Percival Hordern
- Born: 24 November 1884; North Melbourne, Victoria
- Died: 10 October 1967 (aged 82); Ferntree Gully, Victoria

Playing career^{1}
Years	Club	Games (Goals)
1906	Melbourne	5 (1)
- ^{1} Playing statistics correct to the end of 1906.

Edward Percival Hordern (24 November 1884 – 10 October 1967) was an Australian rules footballer who played with Melbourne in the Victorian Football League (VFL).
