= Rowville =

- Suburb
- Interactive map of Rowville
- Coordinates: 37.937°S 145.229°E
- Country: Australia
- State: Victoria
- City: Melbourne
- LGA: City of Knox
- Location: 27 km (17 mi) from Melbourne; 7 km (4.3 mi) from Dandenong
- Established: 1882

Government
  - State electorate: Rowville
  - Federal division: Aston

Area
  - Total: 19.5 km^{2} (7.5 sq mi)
- Elevation: 70 m (230 ft)

Population
  - Total: 33,571 (2021 census)
  - Density: 1,722/km^{2} (4,459/sq mi)
- Postcode: 3178
Suburbs around Rowville
Wheelers Hill	Scoresby	Ferntree Gully
Mulgrave	Rowville	Lysterfield
Dandenong North	Endeavour Hills	Lysterfield South

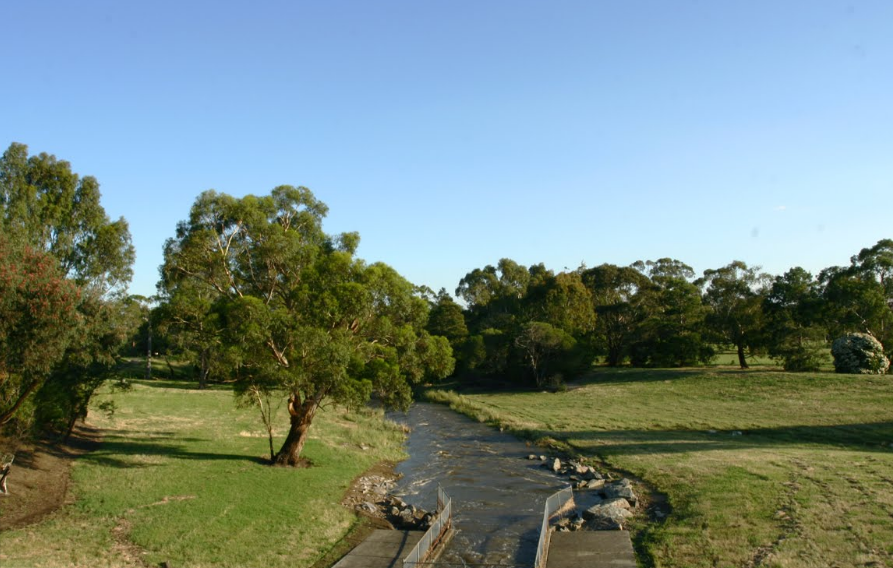
Tirhatuan Wetlands, 2014

Rowville is a suburb in Melbourne, Victoria, Australia, 27 km (17 mi) south-east of Melbourne's Central Business District, located within the City of Knox local government area. Primarily residential, it is one of the largest suburbs south-east of Melbourne, recording a population of 33,571 at the 2021 census.

Rowville is named after the Row family, whose property Stamford Park was established in 1882. The original Rowville Post Office operated between 1905 and 1987, reopening within the Stud Park Shopping Centre in 1989. Rowville developed rapidly throughout the latter half of the 20th century, particularly during the 1980s and 90s with housing and light industrial premises being built.

== Residential ==
Most of the former Stamford Park property was subdivided into Rowville's first housing estate in 1960. It was developed by German-born entrepreneurs Hans Bachrach and Max Naumburger, who tasked the head of engineering at Swinburne, Keith Stevenson, with designing an estate with blocks laid out in a modern American-style layout.

Rowville's first and only low-density community was established on a former cattle farm called Twin Views at the southern end of Taylors Lane. The property had previously been owned by the Raymond family. They sold it to Dandenong agent Gordon Norris shortly after it became the site of a fatal plane crash in 1959. It was subdivided into 50 one-acre blocks in 1961, and the estate has been designated under Low-Density Residential Zoning since 1961.

Shire counciller Bernie Seebeck, who owned an asbestos business, subdivided his land on the south bank of Corhanwarrabul Creek into a hillside housing estate in 1962, shortly before sweeping new town planning controls stunted further growth of the district. Following the second release of land in 1963, it would take another 13 years before Rowville's next development was approved.

In 1976, the private Bexarm Investment Corporation established the Woodview Estate off Valleyview Drive, creating Hillside Park. At the same time, developer Hooker Rex was constructing a large masterplanned community off Stud Road known as Rowville Lakes. Here, over 1500 homes were built, making it the largest development ever undertaken in Knox.

The Park Ridge estate was developed by Stocks & Holdings and occupies 150 hectares between Kellets and Wellington Roads, comprising about 1000 houses.

As empty residential land became increasingly scarce, in the mid-1980s, approval was granted for the development of the Timbertop Estate on part of the former Rowville Training Camp site. The Turramurra Estate at the northern end of Turramurra Drive and the Sovereign Hill estate in Tirhatuan Drive were also established during this period.

The third wave of residential development took place during the late 1980s, with construction of estates such as Rowville Heights near Arcadia Reserve, Tirhatuan Hills next to the Tirhatuan Wetlands, Studwell Park near the south end of Waradgery Drive and the Peppertree Hill retirement village by AV Jennings off Fulham Road.

=== Other residential estates ===
- Waterford Valley Lakes (2004): Retirement village and golf course.
- Sovereign Manors (2001–2002): Developed by the Sunland Group at a cost of over $35 million, providing about 100 homes off Karoo Road.
- Sovereign Crest (2002): Over 800 blocks developed by Nev Pask, situated around Sovereign Crest Boulevard.
- Silkwood Estate

== Industrial ==
The Scoresby Industrial Park, located in and around Laser Drive, was developed by Peter Hibbit as Rowville's first light industrial estate. This marked the beginning of the suburb's industrial estate boom, which continued until the early 1990s. Four rival industrial developments were developed in the suburb over the next two years.

== Education ==
Rowville has one dual-campus high school, Rowville Secondary College, with an Eastern Campus (7–12) and a Western Campus (7–12). Students from the Eastern Campus used to move to the Western Campus to complete their VCE. But now they can complete VCE at the eastern campus as well.

Rowville is served by four public primary schools:

- Rowville Primary School (established 1973)
- Park Ridge Primary (established 1990)
- Karoo Primary School (established 1992)
- Heany Park Primary (established 1993)

It is also served by a Catholic primary school, St. Simon the Apostle School, which was established in 1982.

When Lysterfield Primary School moved to its present site in the 1990s, it was based in Rowville, however the boundary between the suburbs has changed and Lysterfield Primary is once again in Lysterfield.

== Commerce ==
Rowville's main centre of commerce is Stud Park Shopping Centre which opened in 1989 and is the largest shopping centre in the suburb. It houses Coles, Woolworths and Kmart stores, and over 60 specialty stores including two hairdressers, a pharmacy, two travel agents, banks, a vet and assorted food outlets. It has approximately 1500 car park spaces and is serviced regularly by bus services.

Wellington Village, in Wellington Road, is Rowville's second-largest shopping centre. Rowville Lakes is a third, smaller shopping centre on Kelletts Road.

== Sport ==
- Rowville Football Club in the Eastern Football League
- Rowville Knights Community Football Club in the Eastern Football League
- Lysterfield Junior Football Club in the Eastern Football League
- Rowville Cricket Club in the Ferntree Gully District Cricket Association
- Eildon Park Cricket Club in the Ferntree Gully District Cricket Association
- Lysterfield Cricket Club in the Ferntree Gully District Cricket Association
- Rowville Eagles Soccer Club
- Knox United Soccer Club
- Knox Churches Soccer Club
- Blue Park
- Eildon Park Tennis Club
- Rowville Tennis Club
- Rowville Netball Club
- Aston Athletic FC
- Rowville Little Athletics Club
- Rowville Lakes Little Athletics Club
- Rowville Rockets Basketball Club
- Lysterfield Netball Club
- Omega Trampoline Sports Club

Golfers play at the Kingston Links on Corporate Avenue, at the course of the Tirhatuan Park Golf Club on Police and Stud Roads or at the course of the Waverley Golf Club on Bergins Road.

== Community service groups ==
Rowville is supported by local community groups, including the 1st Rowville Scout Group since 1972 and based in its Scout Hall since 1991.

Heany Park Scout Group has been a part of the Rowville community since 1965, starting as 3rd Knox Scout Group. It later moved to Heany Park in 2001 and its name was changed to Heany Park Scout Group. Surrounding the Heany Park Scout Hall is Heany Park, which comprises 9 hectares (23 acres) of natural bushland .

== Governance ==
Rowville is in the federal Division of Aston, which is held by Mary Doyle of the Australian Labor Party.

Rowville is in the state Legislative Assembly seat of Rowville, which is held by Kim Wells of the Liberal Party.

Rowville is part of the City of Knox and is represented by three ward councillors.

== See also ==
- 2012 Rowville Rail Study
- Rowville Training Camp
