= Narre Warren North =

- Suburb
- Interactive map of Narre Warren North
- Coordinates: 37.982°S 145.314°E
- Country: Australia
- State: Victoria
- City: Melbourne
- LGA: City of Casey
- Location: 36 km (22 mi) from Melbourne; 10 km (6.2 mi) from Dandenong

Government
  - State electorate: Narre Warren North
  - Federal division: Bruce

Area
  - Total: 11.5 km^{2} (4.4 sq mi)
- Elevation: 62 m (203 ft)

Population
  - Total: 8,033 (2021 census)
  - Density: 698.5/km^{2} (1,809/sq mi)
- Postcode: 3804
- Mean max temp: 42.0 °C (107.6 °F)
- Mean min temp: 6.9 °C (44.4 °F)
- Annual rainfall: 762.2 mm (30.01 in)
Suburbs around Narre Warren North
Lysterfield South	Lysterfield	Narre Warren East
Endeavour Hills	Narre Warren North	Harkaway
Hallam	Narre Warren	Berwick

Narre Warren North is a suburb in Melbourne, Victoria, Australia, 36 km south-east of Melbourne's Central Business District, located within the City of Casey local government area. Narre Warren North recorded a population of 8,033 at the 2021 census.

== History ==
Before the construction of the Gippsland railway line, Narre Warren North was actually the location of the Narre Warren township. The construction of Narre Warren railway station, however, moved the township 2 km to the south, which is what happened to Upper Beaconsfield, Clyde North and many other townships.

Reflecting this, Narre Warren Post Office opened on 21 January 1869 and in 1900 was renamed Narre Warren North, and Narre Warren Railway Station office (open since 1886) was renamed Narre Warren.

== Sport ==
Berwick City Soccer Club play their home games at Jack Thomas Reserve which is located in the suburb of Narre Warren North. They currently complete in the Victorian State League Division 2 South East.

Narre Warren North Foxes Football Club is a Junior Football Club that is also located in the suburb of Narre Warren North. They train and play at the Narre Warren North Recreation Reserve located on Belgrave-Hallam Road.

== Transport ==
The suburb is connected to Narre Warren, Fountain Gate Shopping Centre, Narre Warren Railway Station, Casey Central, and Cranbourne Railway Station via the 841 bus service.

While there is no direct train service, Narre Warren Railway Station is nearby and allows for easy access to the city, East Pakenham, Traralgon, Sale, and Bairnsdale via Metro Trains Melbourne and V/Line.

== See also ==
- City of Berwick – Narre Warren North was previously within this former local government area.
- Electoral district of Narre Warren North
