= Brendan Joseland =

Australian cricketer (born 1976)

Personal information
- Full name: Brendan Richard Joseland
- Born: 2 April 1976 (age 50); Upper Ferntree Gully, Victoria, Australia
- Batting: Right-handed
- Bowling: Right-arm medium
- Role: Batting all-rounder

Domestic team information
- Years: Team
- 2002/03–2004/05: Victoria
- First-class debut: 4 March 2004 Victoria v Tasmania
- Last First-class: 16 October 2004 Victoria v South Australia
- List A debut: 31 January 2003 Victoria v Queensland
- Last List A: 30 October 2004 Victoria v South Australia

Career statistics
Competition	First-class	List A
Matches	2	8
Runs scored	110	72
Batting average	27.50	12.00
100s/50s	0/2	0/0
Top score	51	23
Balls bowled	36	90
Wickets	1	1
Bowling average	19.00	95.00
5 wickets in innings	0	0
10 wickets in match	0	–
Best bowling	1/19	1/24
Catches/stumpings	2/0	2/0
- Source: CricketArchive, 2 November 2011

Brendan Richard Joseland (born 2 April 1976 in Ferntree Gully, Victoria) is an Australian cricket player for the Victorian Bushrangers.

He plays in the Victorian Premier Cricket league for the University of Melbourne, and has played for Victoria in both the Pura Cup and the ING Cup.

== Cricket career ==
Joseland made his List-A cricket debut in January 2003 against the Queensland Bulls. After playing two more ING Cup matches that season and four more at the start of the 2003/04 season, he had to wait until March 2004 to make his first-class cricket debut in the Pura Cup. He opened the batting and again compiled a 50 in the first innings, however, he would again be forced out of the side. He would remain on the outer for the rest of the season. Despite this disappointment the resilient Joseland continued to perform well as captain of Melbourne University. Scoring 782 runs at an average 52.13 throughout the season. Joseland further restated his all-rounder capabilities by taking 14 wickets for the season.

=== 2005/06 season ===
In the 2005–06 Australian cricket season, Joseland became captain of the Victorian 2nd XI and in the wake of departures from the likes of Matthew Elliott and Ian Harvey, the door was open for Joseland to make a return. However, Lloyd Mash, fellow opener with the 2nd XI, scored 233 in September 2005, which saw him later make his debut for Victoria's seniors.

Meanwhile, Joseland struggled in the district competition and it was not till Round 8 where he scored a 57, and soon after, an unbeaten 90, that he finally hit form (he declared just short of what would have been his maiden century). His first century came soon after for the Victorian 2nd XI, where he made 103* against the ACT, and another one followed for Melbourne Uni against Ringwood.

Joseland was not included in the Victorian 2nd XI's final match of the season despite his good form and the fact that he held the captaincy.

=== 2006/07 season ===
Joseland's contract with the Bushranger's was not renewed for the 2006/07 season, a fact he was braced for by the end of the 05/06 district season. 05/06 was to be Joseland's last season with the University of Melbourne as he was replaced as captain and is no longer with the club or playing at a district level in Victoria.
