= Narre Warren East =

- Town
- Interactive map of Narre Warren East
- Coordinates: 37.961°S 145.367°E
- Country: Australia
- State: Victoria
- City: Melbourne
- LGA: Shire of Yarra Ranges
- Location: 38 km (24 mi) from Melbourne; 12 km (7.5 mi) from Dandenong

Government
  - State electorate: Monbulk
  - Federal division: Casey
- Elevation: 141 m (463 ft)

Population
  - Total: 434 (2021 census)
- Postcode: 3804
Localities around Narre Warren East
Lysterfield	Belgrave South	Emerald
Lysterfield	Narre Warren East
Narre Warren North	Harkaway	Beaconsfield Upper

Narre Warren East is a locality in the Shire of Yarra Ranges, Victoria, Australia. It is located just outside of the Melbourne metropolitan area in, 38 km south-east of Melbourne's central business district. At the 2021 census Narre Warren East had a population of 434.

Despite its name, Narre Warren East is actually located in a north-easterly direction from Narre Warren North. It is also separated from the rest of the Narre Warrens, which are a part of the City of Casey.

Narre Warren East Post Office was short-lived operating in 1911 and 1912.

The Narre Warren East public hall is located on Berwick Road.

Kerrs Park is located in Narre Warren East. Muddy Creek, a tributary of Cardinia Creek flows through the reserve.

Narre Warren East has an active Fire Brigade (CFA) with two appliances servicing the local and surrounding areas.
