= Murders of Margaret and Seana Tapp =

1984 Australian murder case

- Location: Ferntree Gully, Melbourne, Victoria, Australia
- Date: 7 August 1984
- Attack type: Murder
- Deaths: 2
- Victims: Margaret Tapp; Seana Tapp
- Criminal information
- Died: 7 August 1984
- Cause of death: Strangulation
- Reward amount: A$1,000,000 (US$ 751,880)

The murders of Margaret Tapp and Seana Tapp, sometimes simply referred to as the Tapp murders, are unsolved crimes that occurred on 7 August 1984. The murders have been described as one of the most notorious unsolved murder cases in Australian history.

== Background ==
Margaret Christine Tapp (3 June 1949 – 7 August 1984), a 35-year-old nurse who was studying law, and her nine-year-old daughter, Seana (Note: Seana is the female form of the name Sean and is pronounced "shawn-uh", not "see-anne-uh" as it has been mispronounced in some television and radio accounts of the Tapp murders.) Lee Tapp (6 March 1975 – 7 August 1984) lived in Ferntree Gully, Victoria, Australia.

== Investigation ==
Late on 6 August or early on 7 August 1984, an unknown assailant or assailants entered the home, beating, then strangling them to death with a section of rope. The victims' bodies were found in their beds in their nightwear the following day. Seana had been raped prior to her murder.

The case was investigated but quickly went cold. As there were no signs of forced entry, and the victims were attacked in their beds, the perpetrator(s) were probably known to them and aware of the broken lock on the back door.

Other leads included a Dunlop Volley footprint and a red utility vehicle seen parked nearby which was never traced. Potential suspects included colleagues and acquaintances of the single mother, including a doctor who had been paying the house rent prior to his death.

Several suspects were later eliminated via DNA analysis, although complications in 2008 pertaining to the contamination of samples retrieved from the murder scene have cast doubts upon the earlier elimination of some suspects from the police inquiry.

In 2015, investigators reopened the case in a cold case review including the help of well known ex-investigator Ron Iddles. In 2017, an A$1 million reward was offered for information that could lead to a conviction.

== Aftermath ==
The Tapps are buried in Ferntree Gully Cemetery.

== See also ==
- Crime in Australia
- List of unsolved murders (1980–1999)

== Cited works and further reading ==
- Taupin, Jane Moira (2014). Introduction to Forensic DNA Evidence for Criminal Justice Professionals. Boca Raton: CRC Press. ISBN 978-1439899106.
