= Lysterfield South =

- Suburb
- Interactive map of Lysterfield South
- Coordinates: 37.949°S 145.260°E
- Country: Australia
- State: Victoria
- City: Melbourne
- LGA: City of Casey
- Location: 30 km (19 mi) from Melbourne; 6 km (3.7 mi) from Dandenong

Government
  - State electorate: Rowville
  - Federal division: Bruce

Area
  - Total: 4.6 km^{2} (1.8 sq mi)
- Elevation: 155 m (509 ft)

Population
  - Total: 994 (2021 census)
  - Density: 216.1/km^{2} (560/sq mi)
- Postcode: 3156
Suburbs around Lysterfield South
Rowville		Lysterfield
Endeavour Hills	Lysterfield South	Lysterfield
	Endeavour Hills	Narre Warren North

Lysterfield South is an outer suburb in Melbourne, Victoria, Australia, 30 km south-east of Melbourne's Central Business District, located within the City of Casey local government area. Lysterfield South recorded a population of 994 at the 2021 census.

It is notable for containing Churchill National Park which can be entered via Army Road, from Churchill Park Drive.

== History ==
Lysterfield South was originally inhabited by the Wurundjeri tribe of the Kulin nation.

The area was first settled by European settlers in 1838, with it and its surrounding suburbs originally part of Narre Warren North, which it now borders. The development of Lysterfield South is closely linked with that of its neighbouring suburbs Lysterfield and Rowville.
