= Harkaway, Victoria =

Harkaway Melbourne, Victoria
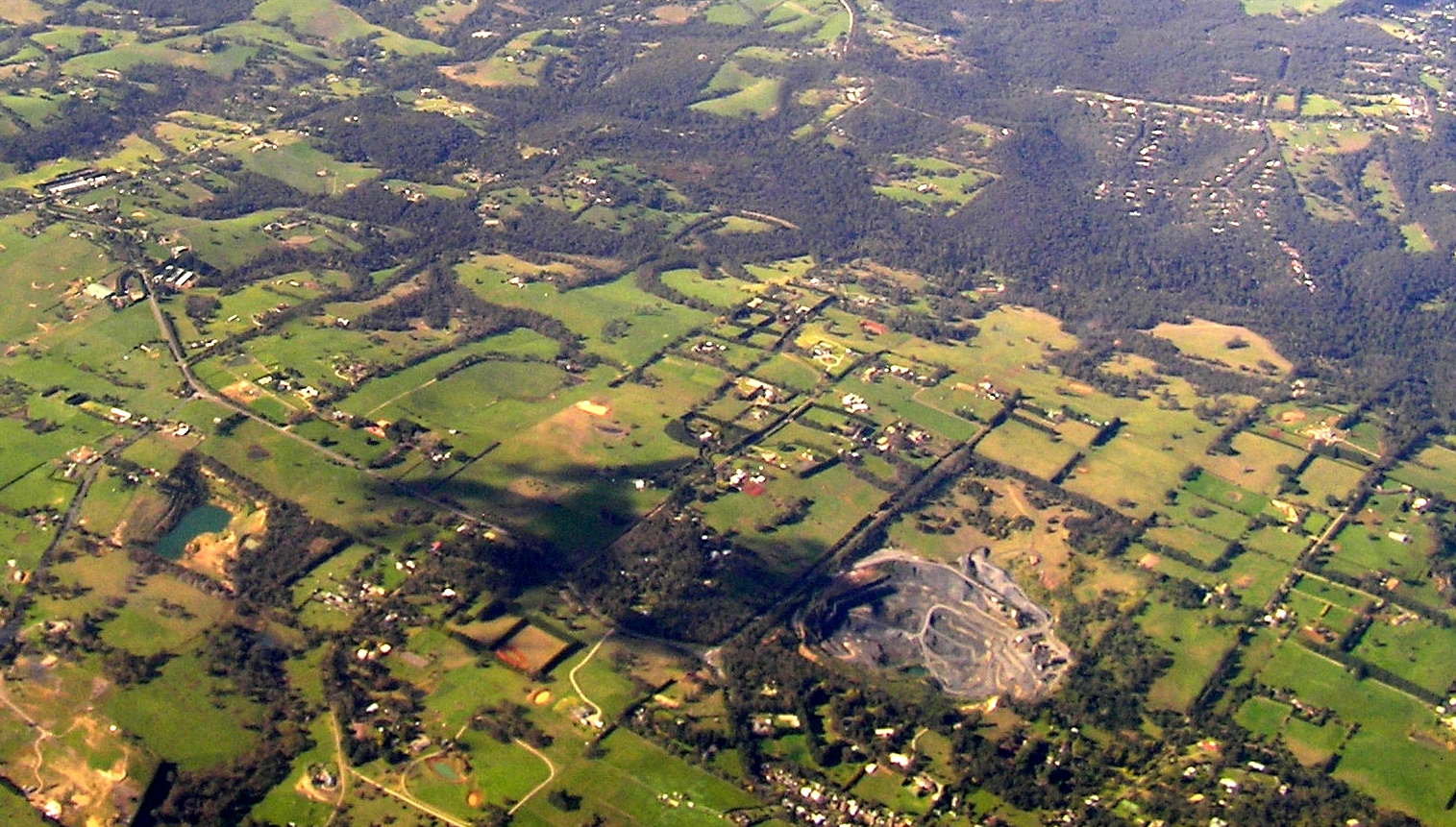
- Aerial view

- Coordinates: 37.999°S 145.344°E
- Population: 1,011 (2021 census)
- Established: 1860s
- Postcode(s): 3806
- Elevation: 167 m (548 ft)
- Location: 39 km (24 mi) from Melbourne
- LGA(s): City of Casey
- State electorate(s): Berwick; Narre Warren North
- Federal division(s): La Trobe; Bruce
Suburbs around Harkaway:
Narre Warren East	Narre Warren East	Emerald
Narre Warren North	Harkaway	Beaconsfield Upper
Narre Warren	Berwick

Harkaway is a suburb in Melbourne, Victoria, Australia, 39 km south-east of Melbourne's central business district, located within the City of Casey local government area. Harkaway recorded a population of 1,011 at the 2021 census.

Harkaway is located at the northeast corner of the City of Casey and is bounded by Robinson, Halleur and Harkaway Roads in the west, Boundary Road in the north, Cardinia Creek in the east, and by an irregular border with Berwick, Victoria below Dalton Reserve in the south.

== History ==
Prior to European settlement, the area was home to the Bunurong and Wurundjeri indigenous peoples. They maintained a traditional hunting and gathering lifestyle with seasonal movements. A number of stone axe heads have been found in the Harkaway area in a location known as "Bald Hill", and some reports say that a corroboree was held there in 1858. However, by 1840, reduction of their hunting grounds, draining of the swamps and introduction of European diseases such as smallpox and measles effectively ended their ability to maintain a traditional lifestyle.

The area was settled by German immigrants in the 1850s. They initially bought land at Thomastown with the intention of subdividing a German settlement, but fresh from trying their luck at the Bendigo goldfields, found the fertile land at Harkaway south of King Road (originally Koenig Road, built as a stock route to water the cattle) and settled there instead. They typically built small timber cottages for themselves and practiced small-scale intensive agriculture on family lots, with the families primarily engaged in clearing the land and growing wheat, oats and potatoes, and "also very active in dairying". However, a townsite was never actually declared. Harkaway Post Office opened on 1 January 1865.

The settlers also constructed a number of other buildings – a Lutheran church (1869), the belfry of which is still intact and is located on Hessell Road; a single-room brick school (1876), a post office and a community hall (1909).

== Notable people ==
Minnie a'Beckett, who married Arthur Merric Boyd, founder of the Boyd artistic dynasty, was based at "The Grange" in Harkaway in her early years, and Jessie Traill (1881–1967), a noted Australian painter, set up a studio in the 1920s.

== Present day ==
The town can be reached from Melbourne and the Monash Freeway by exiting at Heatherton Road, which becomes King Road on entering Harkaway. Most services are provided from nearby Berwick and Narre Warren. With the exception of Harkaway Road, Marks Court, St Fort Court, and a portion of King Road and Noack Road, all roads outside the main town are unsealed.

In 2023, Harkaway Primary School had an enrolment of 116 students, 58 female and 58 male, a community hall, tennis courts and numerous walking and equestrian trails.

The area is not served by Melbourne public transport.

It contained the Pioneer Harkaway quarry on Noack Road, now closed.

== See also ==
- City of Berwick – Harkaway was previously within this former local government area.
