= Electoral district of Narre Warren North =

State electoral district of Victoria, Australia

Narre Warren North Victoria—Legislative Assembly
- Interactive map of electoral district boundaries from the 2022 state election
- State: Victoria
- Created: 2002
- MP: Belinda Wilson
- Party: Labor Party
- Namesake: Narre Warren North
- Electors: 44,724 (2018)
- Area: 70 km^{2} (27.0 sq mi)
- Demographic: Metropolitan
Electorates around Narre Warren North:
Rowville		Monbulk
Dandenong	Narre Warren North	Berwick
Dandenong	Narre Warren South	Berwick

The electoral district of Narre Warren North is an electorate of the Victorian Legislative Assembly and includes the suburbs of Hallam, Narre Warren, Narre Warren North and parts of Berwick, Endeavour Hills and Harkaway.

Narre Warren North was created as a seat with a notional Liberal majority in an electoral redistribution before the November 2002 state election. In the Labor landslide of that election, new Labor candidate Luke Donnellan overcame the notional majority to defeat Liberal MLC Maree Luckins, who had been attempting to switch to the Legislative Assembly. He was subsequently re-elected in 2006 and 2010, and again in 2014 after the 2013 redistribution slightly increased his majority. In December 2014, Donnellan was appointed Minister for Roads and Road Safety and Minister for Ports in the new Andrews Ministry after Labor's victory at the 2014 election. At the 2022 state election, Labor candidate Belinda Wilson was elected to the seat, following Donnellan's retirement.

== Members for Narre Warren North ==
Member	Party	Term
Luke Donnellan	Labor	2002–2022
Belinda Wilson	Labor	2022–present

== Election results ==
2022 Victorian state election: Narre Warren North
Party	Candidate	Votes	%	±%
Labor	Belinda Wilson	19,350	46.8	−4.4
Liberal	Timothy Dragan	11,291	27.3	−8.1
Greens	Laura McLean	2,809	6.8	+0.6
Family First	Christine Elkins	1,530	3.7	+3.7
Liberal Democrats	Stephen Matulec	1,325	3.2	+3.2
Freedom	Craig Parker	1,218	2.9	+2.9
Democratic Labour	Andrew Zmegac	1,191	2.9	−1.1
Animal Justice	Sheree Gardner	978	2.4	+2.4
Independent	Stephen Capon	906	2.2	+2.2
Shooters, Fishers, Farmers	Monique Ruyter	772	1.9	+1.9
Total formal votes		41,370	92.0	−1.1
Informal votes		3,602	8.0	+1.1
Turnout		44,972	86.7	−1.7
Two-party-preferred result
Labor	Belinda Wilson	24,302	58.7	−1.7
Liberal	Timothy Dragan	17,068	41.3	+1.7
Labor hold		Swing	−1.7	
