= Churchill National Park =

National park in Victoria, Australia

- IUCN category II (national park)
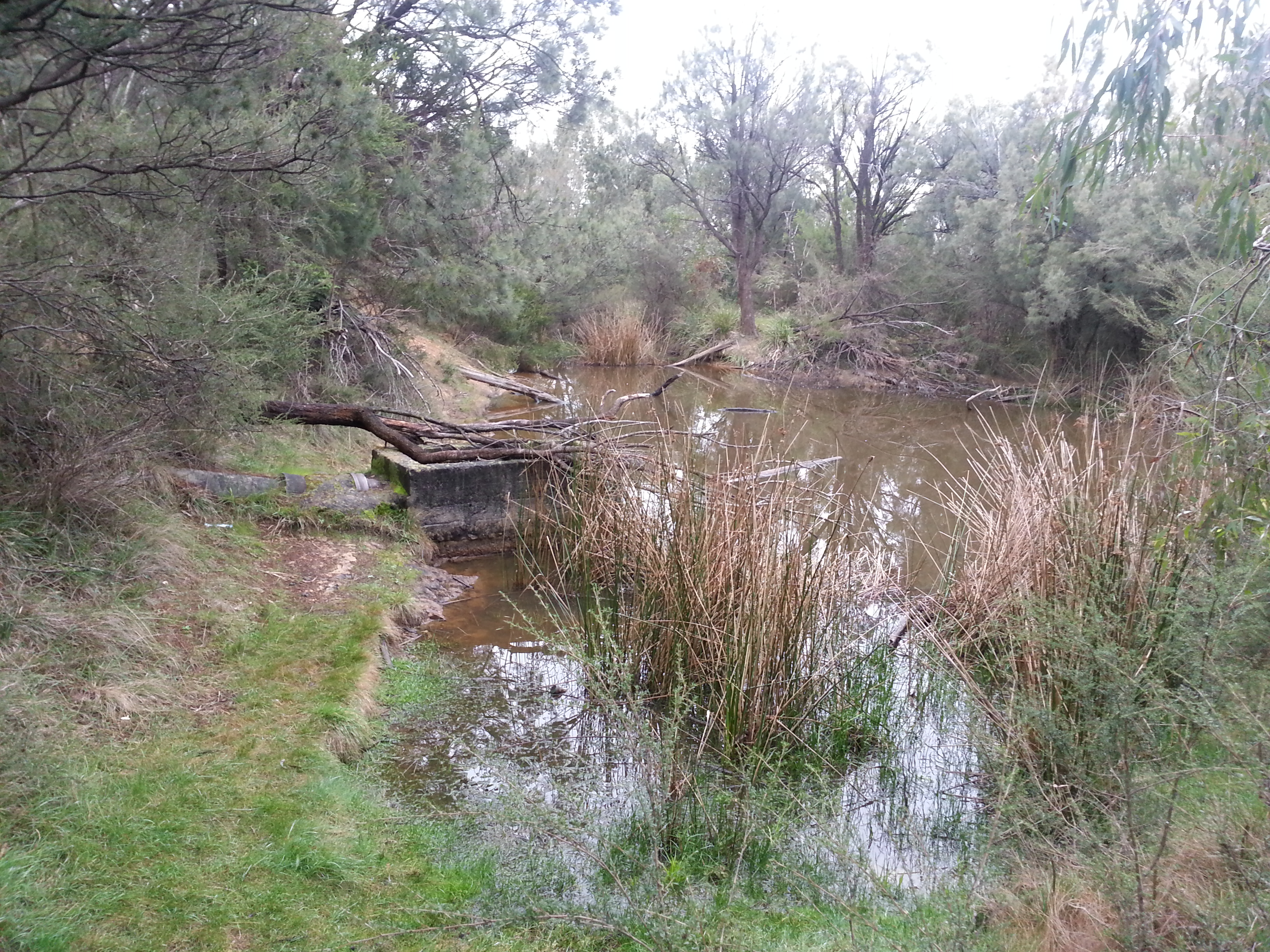
- The remains of aqueduct and pipeline, Churchill National Park.

- Location within Victoria
- Location: Victoria
- Nearest city: Lysterfield South
- Coordinates: 37°57′05″S 145°15′37″E
- Area: 2.71 km^{2} (1.05 sq mi)
- Established: 12 February 1941
- Governing body: Parks Victoria

The Churchill National Park is a national park located in the Greater Melbourne region of Victoria, Australia. The 271-hectare (670-acre) national park is situated 31 kilometres (19 mi) southeast of Melbourne adjacent to the suburb of Lysterfield South, which lies between Rowville and Endeavour Hills in the far north of the City of Casey. The national park is near the Monash Freeway and Stud Road. When combined with the adjacent Lysterfield Park, the two parks comprise 1,668 hectares (4,120 acres) in the Dandenong Valley and the Dandenong Ranges that are a haven for native birds, mammals and reptiles, and provide recreational opportunities.

Established on 12 February 1941 as the Dandenong National Park, the park was renamed in 1944 in honour of Sir Winston Churchill.

Churchill National Park is about one and a half hours from Melbourne, Victoria.

== Features ==
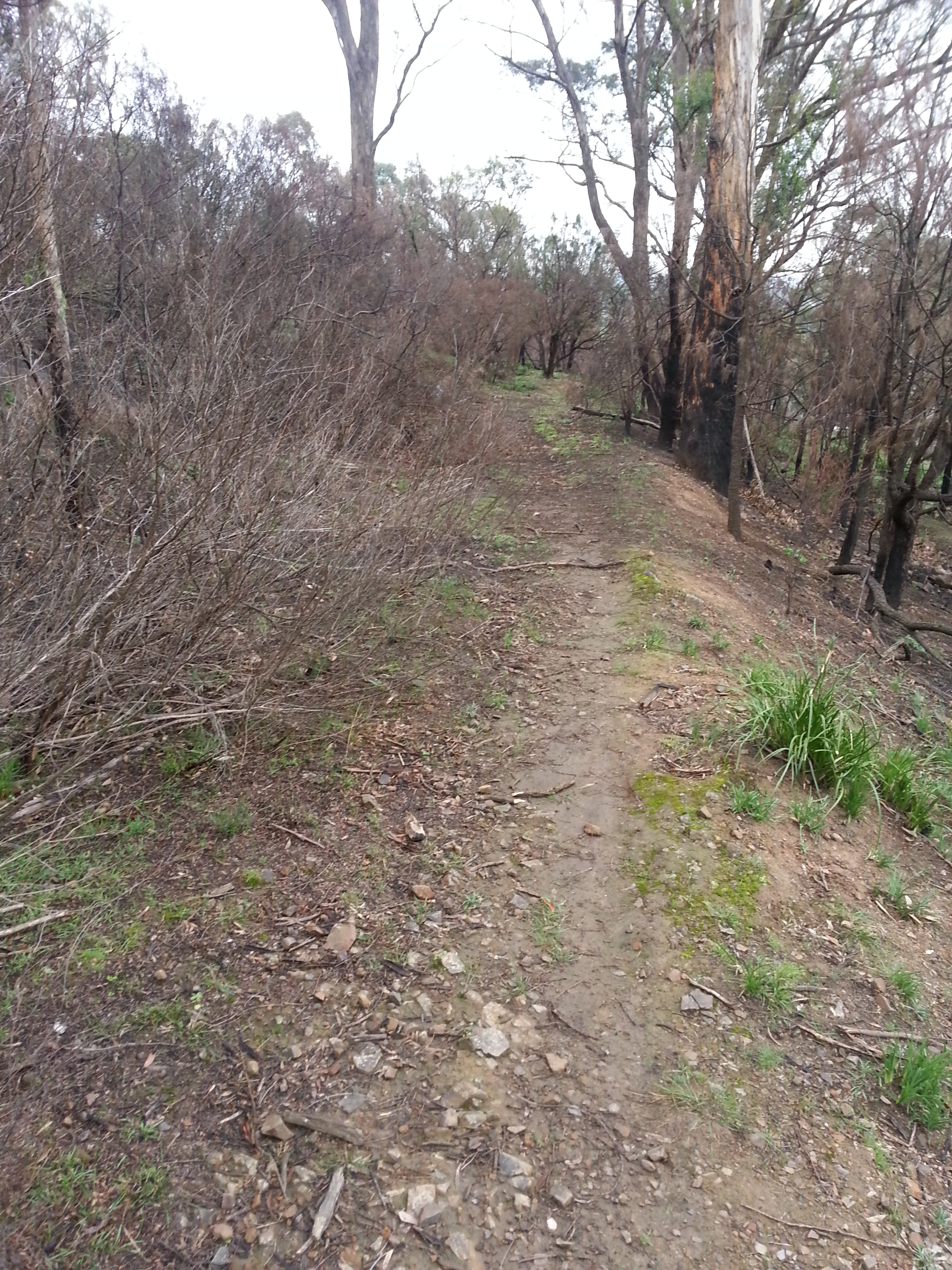
The Scoresby Tramway, 1912–1915, now partly in the national park, carried crushed rock for Dandenong Shire Council.

There are tracks throughout the Churchill National Park for walking, cycling and jogging. One recommended walking track for a very peaceful walk is Channel Track, surrounded by thick woodland and it runs beside the old aqueduct. The eastern boundary track is particularly good for cycling and jogging. Bird watching is spectacular within the park especially by the dam along the northern boundary track.

The picnic ground has gas barbecues, a unisex toilet and a shelter. Picnic grounds are provided on the end of the access road.

Churchill National Park is famous for its 173 different species of birds, such as the Australian wood duck and the Pacific black duck. Most mammals are only active at night, so if you arrive early or leave late, you might be lucky enough to see one, such as echidnas, wallabies and kangaroos. Echidnas are also active during the day, searching for ants and grubs in the ground.

== History ==
The park that is now Churchill National Park was once the police corps headquarters for blacktrackers and provided grazing land for the police horses. Many years later it was known as the Dandenong Police Paddocks. In the 1920s, metropolitan development brought some change to the parklands, which was still known as Police Paddocks. Local stone was dug up for road metal and building material, a water supply channel was cut to Dandenong, and the State Electricity Commission obtained a power line easement. Fire and the clearing of the area took place. In 1939 the area was set aside as the Dandenong National Park, gazetted in February 1941, and later renamed Churchill National Park in 1944.

An old quarry is located in the northwest corner of the park, where remains of the associated tramway and crusher foundations are still visible. The tramway was known as the Scoresby Tramway. Constructed by the Dandenong Shire Council in 1912, it was used to transport crushed rock from the quarry. The wagons travelled by gravity for most of the distance; when the topography leveled out, horses were used to draw them. The quarry operated for approximately three years. The tramway was removed after the cessation of quarrying.

== See also ==
- Protected areas of Victoria
