= Ferntree Gully =

- Suburb
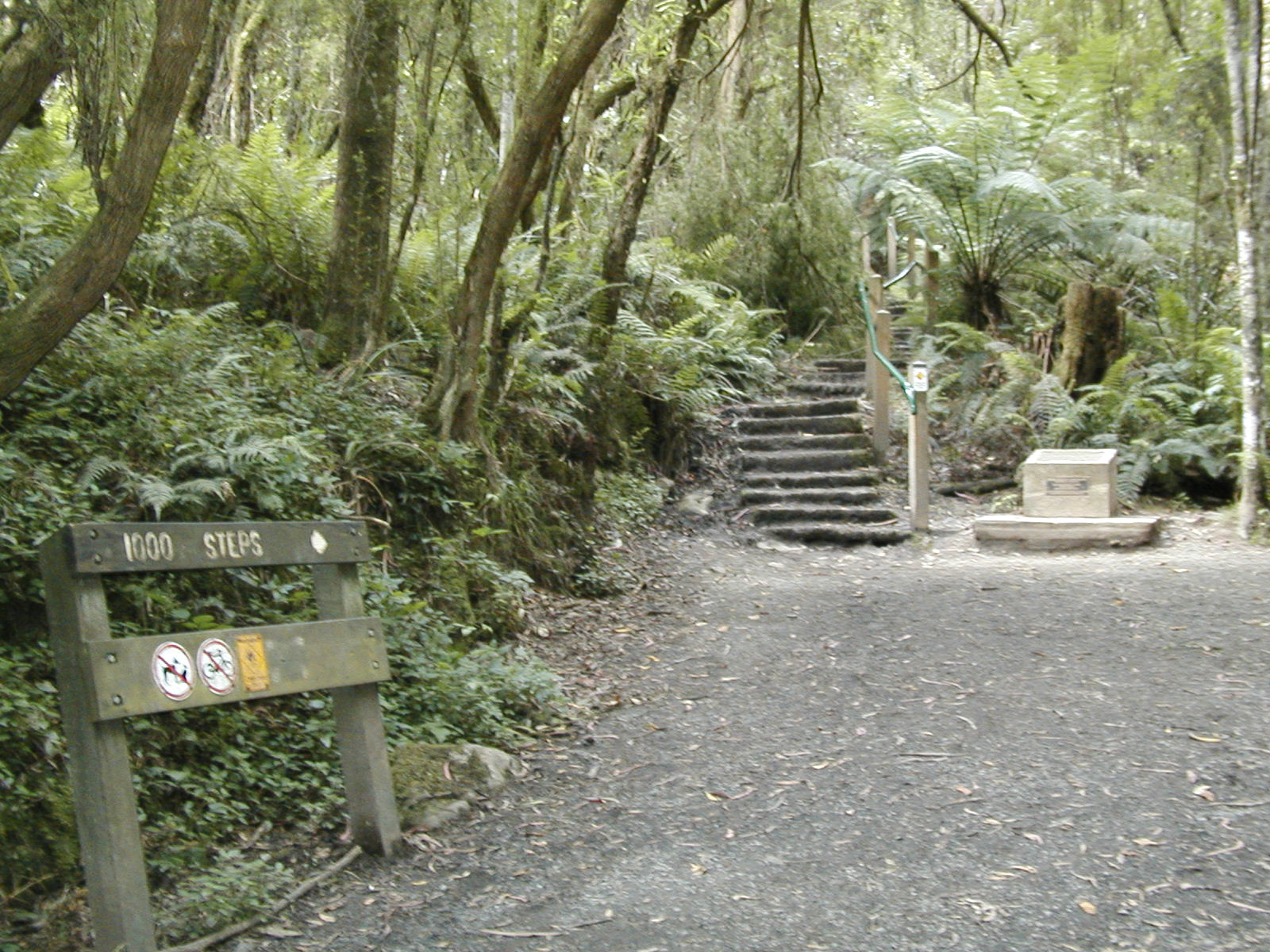
- The 1000 Steps Kokoda track

- Interactive map of Ferntree Gully
- Coordinates: 37.8862°S 145.2821°E
- Country: Australia
- State: Victoria
- City: Melbourne
- LGA: City of Knox
- Location: 30 km (19 mi) E of Melbourne CBD; 12 km (7.5 mi) NW of Belgrave
- Established: 1880s

Government
  - State electorates: Bayswater; Monbulk
  - Federal division: Aston

Area
  - Total: 14 km^{2} (5.4 sq mi)
- Elevation: 150 m (490 ft)

Population
  - Total: 27,398 (2021 census)
  - Density: 1,960/km^{2} (5,070/sq mi)
- Postcode: 3156
Suburbs around Ferntree Gully
| Boronia | Boronia | Tremont |
| Knoxfield | Ferntree Gully | Upper Ferntree Gully |
| Rowville | Lysterfield | Lysterfield |

Ferntree Gully is a suburb in Melbourne, Victoria, Australia, at the foothills of the Dandenong Ranges, 30 km east of Melbourne's Central Business District, located within the City of Knox local government area. Ferntree Gully recorded a population of 27,398 at the 2021 census.

Ferntree Gully, The Basin, Boronia and Upper Ferntree Gully are the only Dandenong Ranges towns or suburbs in the City of Knox (although some parts of Upper Ferntree Gully are within the Shire of Yarra Ranges). The City of Knox is one of the few cities not broken-up during the Kennett government review of councils and had its area expanded to include parts of Upper Ferntree Gully that were previously in the Shire of Sherbrooke (now part of the Yarra Ranges Shire).

Ferntree Gully and Belgrave are closely linked in many ways. Ferntree Gully is younger than Belgrave (Belgrave being established in 1851 and Ferntree Gully in 1880).

Ferntree Gully has many Eucalyptus trees (gum trees) and lies at the foothills of the Dandenong Ranges. Its boundaries meet Upper Ferntree Gully, a separate but similarly named suburb with the same postcode, Boronia to the North, Scoresby to the West and Lysterfield to the South. The eastern boundary coincides with the Ferntree Gully National Park which is a National Park administered by the Federal Government. Ferntree Gully is in a high fire risk area in the vicinity of the Ferntree Gully National Park, however the majority of the suburb is considered low risk.

== Environment ==
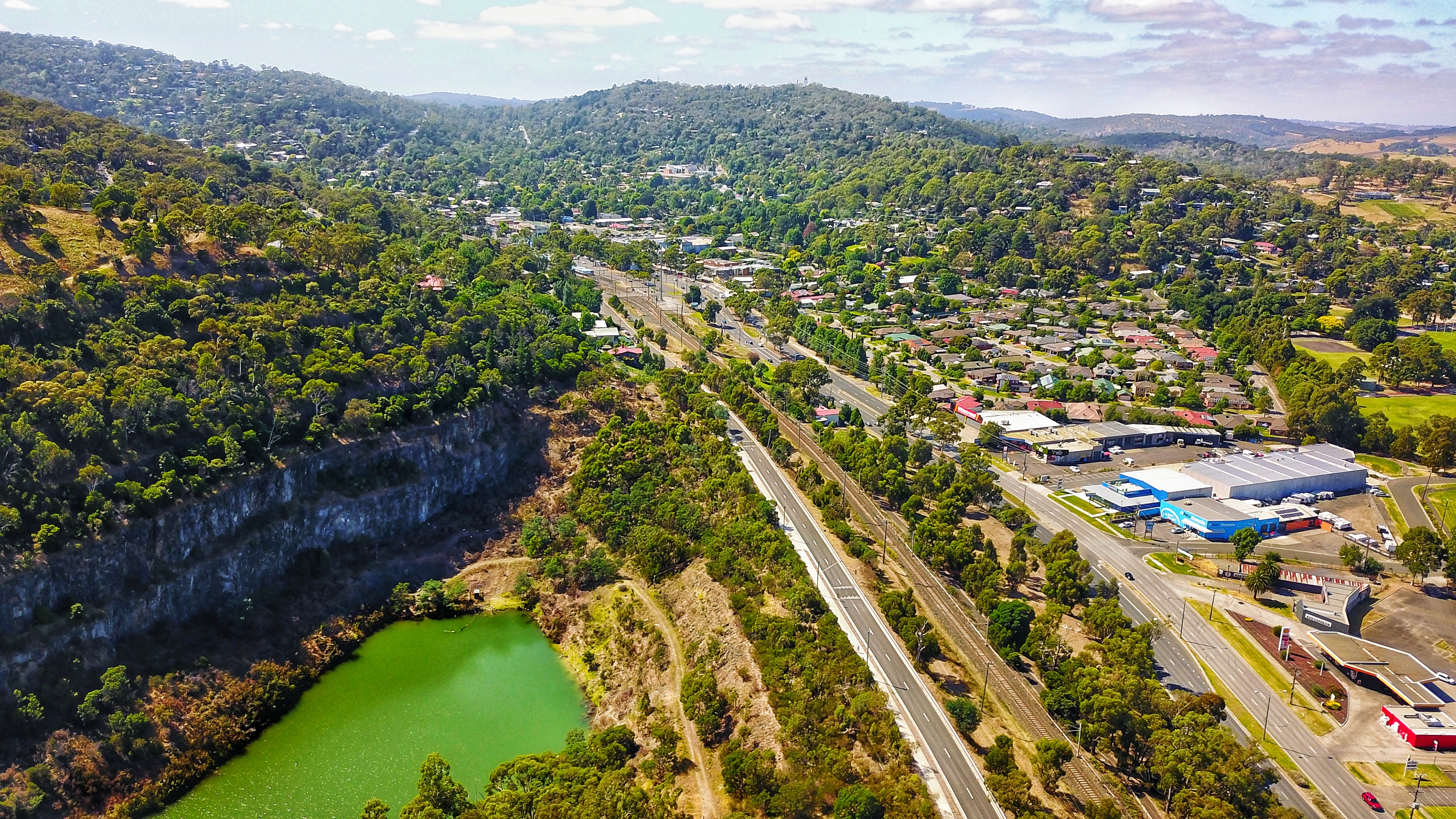
Aerial perspective of Ferntree Gully Quarry Recreational Reserve and a section of the Dandenong ranges

Natural features include a large part of the Dandenong Ranges National Park which forms a picturesque backdrop to Ferntree Gully, especially the Ferntree Gully village part of the suburb. Important features of that national park include One Tree Hill (formerly a fire-lookout, but now covered with trees, the lookout has been removed), and the Kokoda Trail, a memorial walk dedicated to the Kokoda Trail of WW2 (includes interpretive signage)—this part of the National Park (which is well known as "1000 steps", where many tourists go) is located in the neighbouring suburb of Upper Ferntree Gully—and accessed via the Mt Dandenong Tourist Road. It is also a place for picnics and exercise, where many community groups meet.

== History ==
Prior to colonisation, Ferntree Gully was home to the Wurundjeri Aboriginal people prior to European settlement. An abundance of Tree ferns stretched from the Township to the National Park and picturesque scenery and lush flora started attracting recreational visitors from the 1870s. In 1882, the gully was set aside for public use. Throughout the 1880s the township began to grow, shops were established, as well as hotels, churches, and a primary school.

The area became more accessible to visitors with the arrival of a railway line extension from Ringwood, completed in 1889. Initially the line terminated at Upper Ferntree Gully, with a narrow-gauge line extending to Gembrook in 1900. Between 1958 and 1962, the narrow-gauge 2' 6" line was upgraded to broad gauge 5' 3" and electrified to Belgrave which is where the narrow-gauge line (now better known as Puffing Billy) operates from today.

The Shire of Fern Tree Gully was also proclaimed in 1889. The old shire offices, on the corner of Selman Avenue and Burwood Highway, have been preserved under a heritage. It was also used as the local library for many years. On 4 July 1969, the Shire of Knox was proclaimed a "City" and new offices were built on Burwood Highway, Wantirna South where the offices are today.

Ambleside Homestead, in Olivebank Road, Ferntree Gully, was built in the 1890s and is now the base for the Knox Historical Society and a local history museum.

== Neighbourhoods ==
=== Kent Park ===
In 1872, Scottish settler William Kennedy Ross secured the title to a triangular portion of land bounded by Ferntree Gully Road, Scoresby Road and Burwood Highway. The subsequent owner named the area west of Dobson Street "Kent Park". In the early 1900s, the 70-hectare estate were used for general grazing, farming, growing oats and keeping a variety of livestock. John Aitken bought Kent Park in 1913, selling most of the original purchase to a Mr Powell in 1921. The latter then sold to a Brigadier Knox, who in turn sold all except 4 hectares to Alex Creswick. During the late 1960s, Hooker-Rex Estates purchased 44 hectares from the Creswick family for the current housing estate. The Education Department bought the land on which Kent Park primary school now stands.

=== Mountain Gate ===
In the mid-1950s, Chinese-born entrepreneur Isidor Magid and one of his companies, the Overland Development Corporation, started buying farmland on the south side of Ferntree Gully Road near Ferny Creek with plans for a major residential community. Officially opened on 17 October 1959 as the Mountain Gate Estate, it was marketed as the "town of a thousand homes" incorporating a modern car-oriented shopping centre and public parkland. Advertisements included television broadcasts and a large billboard at Burwood Highway. Isidor Magid later went onto build the Fountain Gate Shopping Centre, its name being a node to Mountain Gate which was his first major development.

=== Johnson Park and Fairhills ===
The Johnson Park and Fairhills estates are roughly bounded by Blind Creek (north), Burwood Highway (south), McMahons Road (east) and Scoresby Road (west). Though marketed separately, both developments were established by private firm Stockdale & Leggo in 1959 and mostly built on during in the 1960s. Fairpark Reserve and the Fairhills Primary School were also established here alongside a small group of shops with a milk bar.

== Community ==
There is the Ferntree Gully library and community centre, where the Knox Festival is held in March every year (the alternative venue being in Rowville). Each December, the Knox Christmas Carols are held on the grounds of the Ferntree Gully football/Cricket club in Brenock Park Drive (now known as Wally Tew Reserve).

Notable community and retail sites in Ferntree Gully include the Coolstore on Dorset Road (which was owned and run by local orchardist Ken Dobson and his family for over 40 years until 2007), Woolworths Supermarket, Brennock Park Drive is one of the busiest in Australia, the Knox Environment Society (based at the rear of Ferntree Gully Secondary College, which closed at the end of 2006) and the Knox Historical Society (based at Ambleside Historical homestead). There are two pubs in Ferntree Gully, both on Burwood Highway—The Ferntree Gully Hotel (or "The Middle") and the Club Hotel (the former Vass's Pub).

Retirement villages include Amaroo on Burwood Highway and Glengollan on Underwood Road.

== Places of worship ==
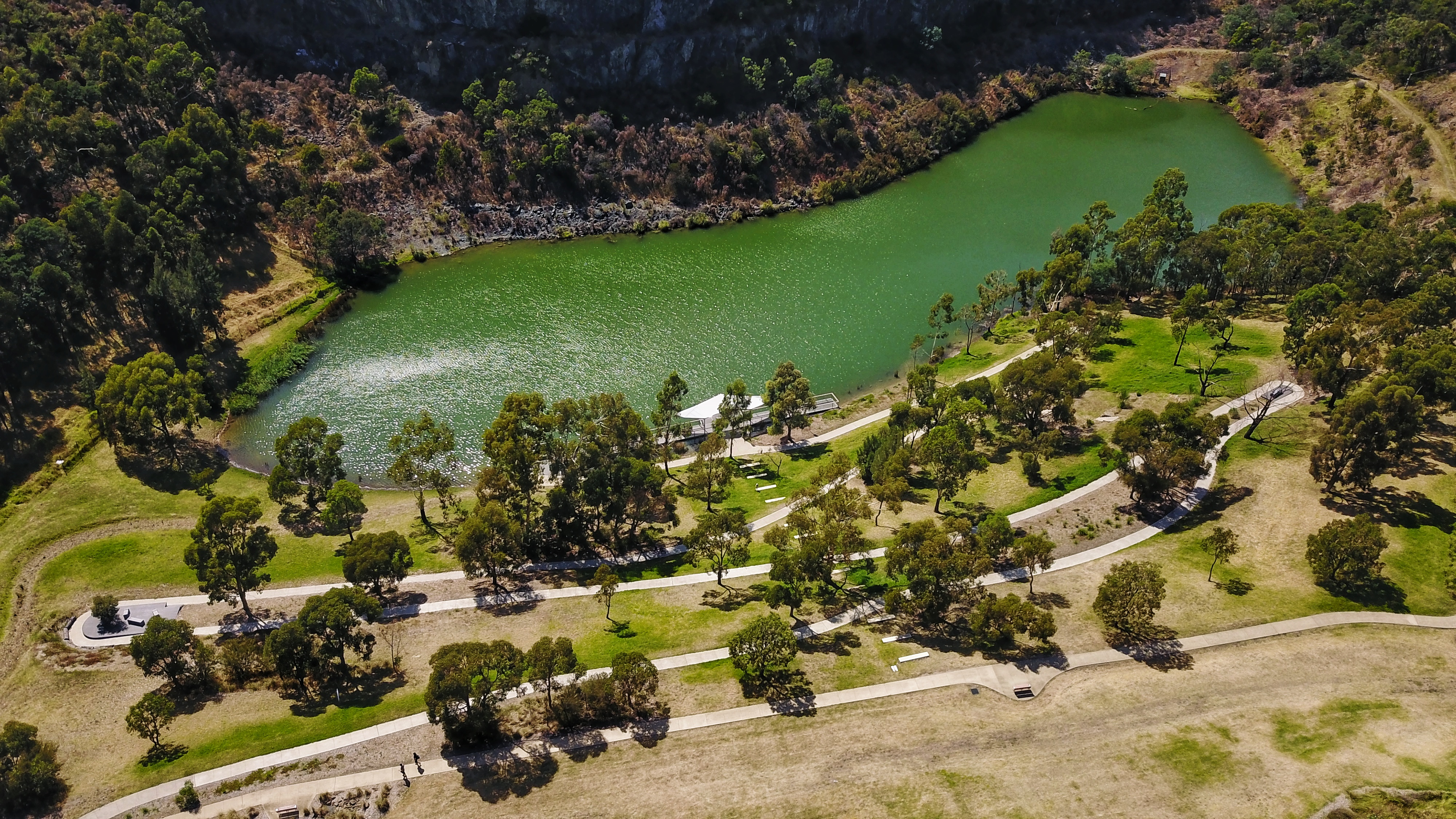
Aerial perspective of the quarry lake at Ferntree Gully Quarry Recreational Reserve

There are a number of groups providing for the local community. These include the Ferntree Gully Seventh Day Adventist Church in Upper Ferntree Gully, Hills Christian Life Church, Ferntree Gully Baptist Church, Ferntree Gully Independent Baptist Church, Armenian Catholic Church, Saint John the Baptist Catholic Church, Foothills Community Church, Olive Branch Fellowship, Salvation Army, Ferntree Gully Uniting Church and the Upper Gully Christadelphians

The former Churches of England, Methodist and Presbyterian were located in the Ferntree Gully Village in Station Street (C of E), at the intersection of Selman Avenue, The Avenue (M) and Francis Crescent (P). The Church of England moved to a new site on Burwood Highway near Burke Rd and recently merged with the Rowville church with the land being sold for housing.

== Sport ==
There are a number of sports represented in Ferntree Gully including cricket, netball (the Mountain Districts Netball Association courts are based in Ferntree Gully), basketball (Knox City Basketball Centre & Club), Australian rules football (Ferntree Gully Eagles and Fairpark Lions compete in the Eastern Football League), tennis, swimming (Knox-Sherbrooke Swimming Centre), table tennis, lawn bowls and gymnastics (Knox Gymnastics Centre). A baseball complex is located in nearby Upper Ferntree Gully (Kings Park, Willow Road, Upper Ferntree Gully).

== Emergency services ==
Ferntree Gully has one Ambulance Victoria station. It holds up to three ambulances. In 2016, works started on upgrades at the time all Ambulance Victoria staff and Ambulances were moved to the CFA station. In 2017, the new station opened.

Ferntree Gully is home to a fully volunteer Country Fire Authority Fire Brigade established in 1942. Boasting two engine bays and four appliances and a services building at the rear, it is one of the busiest volunteer stations in the state. It is backed up by other volunteer CFA Brigades in The Basin, Scoresby and Upper Ferntree Gully and including two permanent/volunteer stations in Boronia and Rowville.

== Schools ==
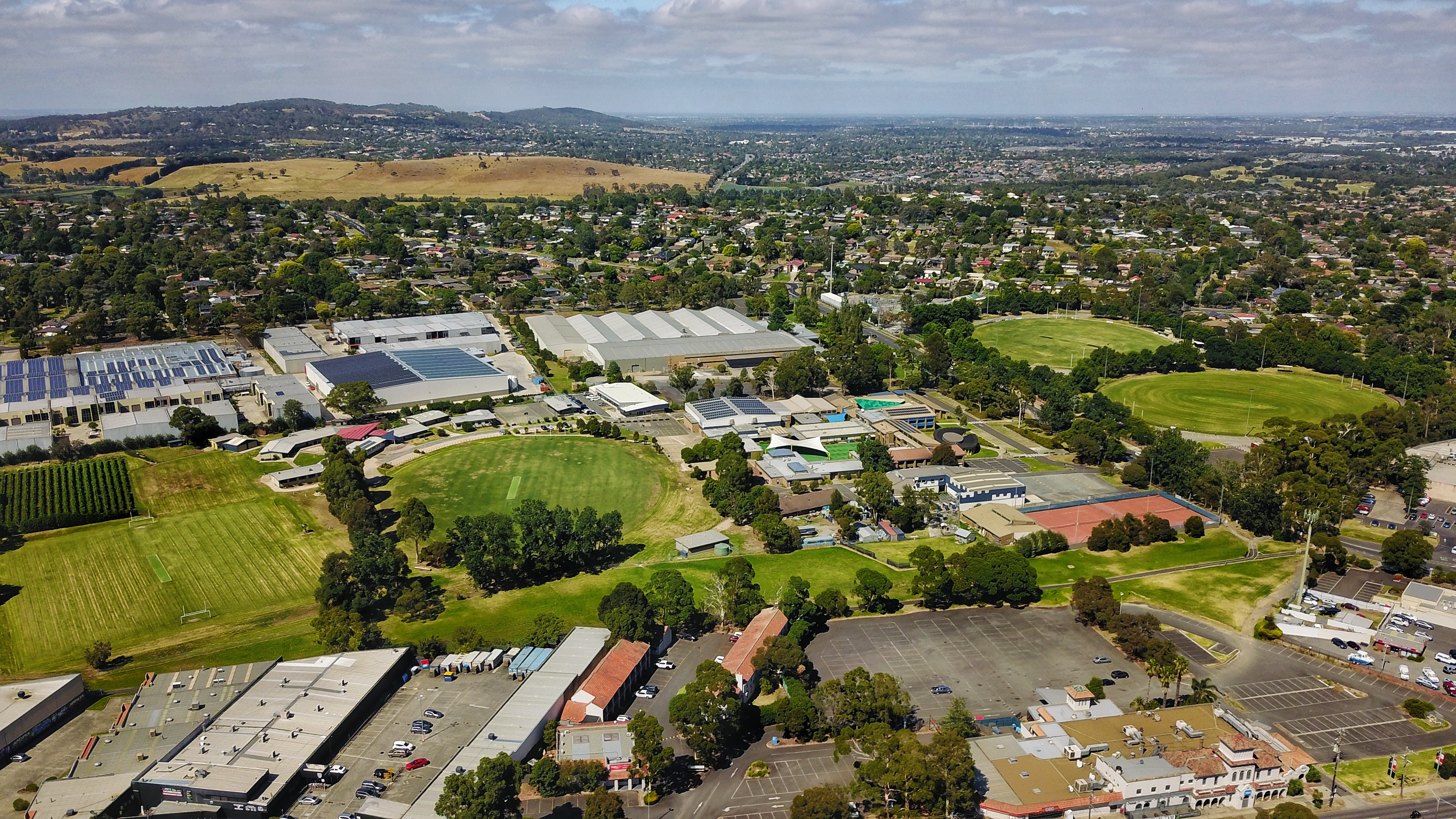
Aerial perspective of St Joseph's College and surrounds in Ferntree Gully

In the immediate vicinity of Ferntree Gully Railway station is an abundance of schools. St John's Primary School and St Josephs Secondary College and Ferntree Gully North Primary School are all within 10 minutes walk. There are also primary schools at Mountain Gate and Wattleview Primary school and Kent Park Primary School. It also has pre schools in the area.

=== Education ===
There are several primary schools — Wattleview Primary School, Eastern Ranges School, Ferntree Gully North Primary School, Kent Park Primary School, Mountain Gate Primary School, St John the Baptist Primary School, and Fairhills Primary School. The site of the former Ferntree Gully Primary school (Burwood Highway, Ferntree Gully) houses a number of buildings of historical significance for the area. The school itself closed at the end of the 2005 school year and has been developed as social housing.

There is one secondary school in Ferntree Gully—St Joseph's College (A Catholic boys college in the care of the Salesians of Don Bosco for students in Years 7 – 12). There was another secondary school—Ferntree Gully Secondary College (for students in Years 7–12)—which closed at the end of the 2006 school year. The U3A (University of the Third Age) for retired persons is a co-operative education setting located in Ferntree Gully.

There are a number of kindergartens in Ferntree Gully including Bena Angliss Pre-school.

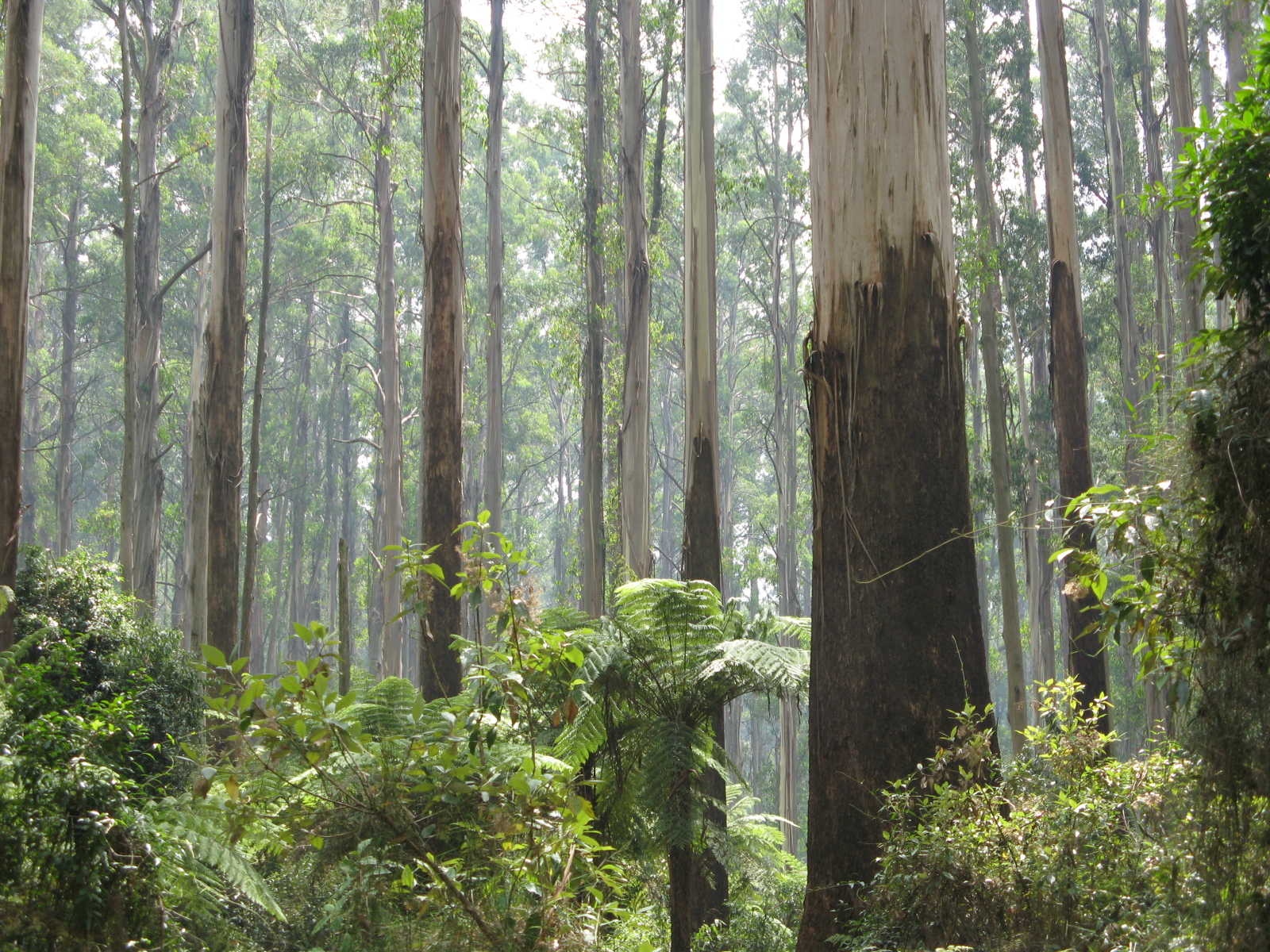
Sherbrooke Forest

== Community groups ==
Community groups include Ferntree Gully CFA volunteer fire brigade, Scouts at 1st Ferntree Gully and 4th Knox, Girl Guides and Rotary.

== Transport ==
Ferntree Gully has a railway station located on Station Street, near the shopping district, which was previously known as Lower Ferntree Gully, followed by Fern Tree Gully, having been changed to the latter on 29 February 1972. The suburb is on the Belgrave railway line and it takes between 42 minutes (stopping all stations and then express service from Box Hill) to 60 minutes (all stations service) to Flinders Street, CBD.

A number of Melbourne bus routes also service the suburb which is run by Ventura bus lines and use the Ferntree Gully Railway station located on Station Street as a Terminus. The Railway station is a Premium fully staffed Metro station with PSOs after 6pm. There are 1000 car parking spaces. 108 trains pass through Ferntree Gully per day between Belgrave and the CBD with many running express from Box Hill to the city and express to Box hill on the way to Belgrave.

== Notable people ==
- Pippa Black — actress
- David Borthwick — public servant
- Aaron Cameron — racing driver
- Trudi Canavan — writer
- Dick Clay — AFL player
- Anne Eckstein — politician
- Sam Frost — actress
- Harry Garside — boxer
- Shaun Hart — AFL player
- Brent Hobba — basketball player
- Madeleine Hogan — Paralympic javelin thrower
- Roger Jaensch — politician
- Brendan Joseland — cricketer
- Justin Kane — boxer
- Rod Moss — painter and writer
- Jaidyn Stephenson — AFL player
- Margaret and Seana Tapp — murder victims
- Mac Wright — cricketer
- Shane Warne — cricketer

== Commerce ==
Mountain Gate Shopping Centre lies on the corner of Ferntree Gully Road and Burwood Highway. The Ferntree Gully Village at the intersection of Station Street, Alpine Street and Forest Road is the official site of Ferntree Gully Township, Railway Station and historic town centre. It contains supermarkets, green grocer's, butchers and curiosity shops as well as a selection of unique restaurants and cafes. It also has one of the busiest railway stations in the City of Knox.

== See also ==
- Electoral district of Ferntree Gully
