= Belinda Wilson =

Australian politician

Member of the Victorian Legislative Assembly for Narre Warren North
- Incumbent
- Assumed office 26 November 2022
- Preceded by: Luke Donnellan

Personal details
- Party: Labor

Belinda Wilson is an Australian politician who is a member of the Victorian Legislative Assembly, representing the district of Narre Warren North. She is a member of the Labor Party and won her seat at the 2022 state election following the retirement of Labor MP Luke Donnellan.

Prior to entering Parliament, Wilson worked as an electorate officer for federal politician Josh Burns and in business. She is married and has three children, and lives in south-east Melbourne.

In February 2023, Wilson was appointed Deputy Government Whip in the Legislative Assembly.
