= Lysterfield, Victoria =

Lysterfield
- Suburb
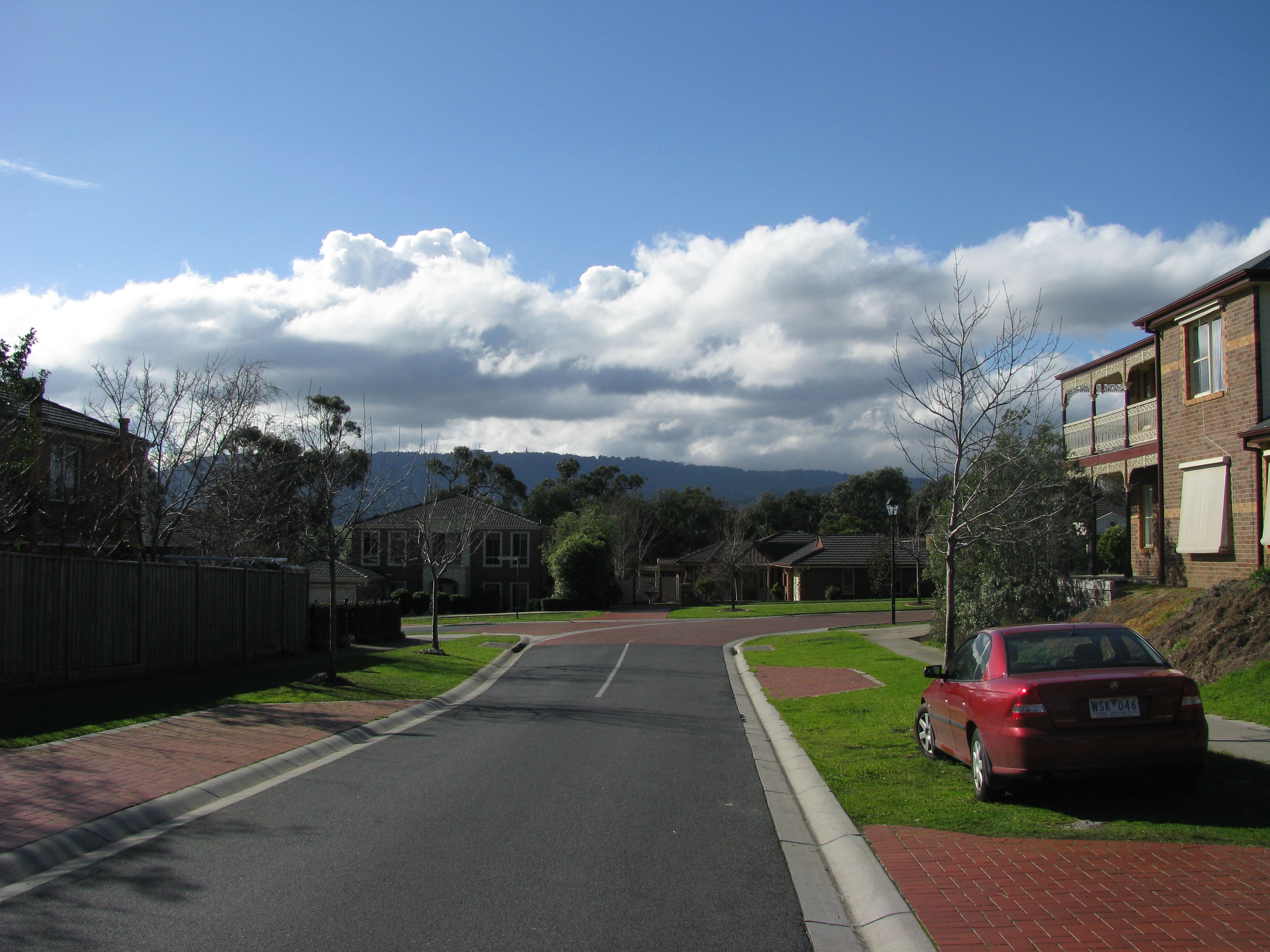
- Oaktree Rise, Lysterfield

- Interactive map of Lysterfield
- Coordinates: 37.930°S 145.301°E
- Country: Australia
- State: Victoria
- City: Melbourne
- LGAs: City of Knox; Yarra Ranges Shire
- Location: 32 km (20 mi) from Melbourne; 10 km (6.2 mi) from Dandenong

Government
  - State electorates: Monbulk; Rowville
  - Federal divisions: Aston; Casey

Area
  - Total: 2.1 km^{2} (0.81 sq mi)
- Elevation: 144 m (472 ft)

Population
  - Total: 6,681 (2021 census)
  - Density: 3,180/km^{2} (8,240/sq mi)
- Postcode: 3156
Suburbs around Lysterfield
Ferntree Gully	Upper Ferntree Gully	Upwey
Rowville	Lysterfield	Belgrave South
Lysterfield South	Narre Warren North	Narre Warren East

Lysterfield (Boonwurrung: Waralk-warrabin) is a suburb in Melbourne, Victoria, Australia, 32 km (20 mi) south-east of Melbourne's Melbourne CBD, located within the City of Knox and the Yarra Ranges Shire local government areas. Lysterfield recorded a population of 6,681 at the 2021 census.

== History ==
The area around Lysterfield was first settled in 1838. Initially it was part of Narre Warren but was named Lysterfield in 1874 when land was set aside for a primary school. At this time, Lysterfield included what is now Rowville. The land was primarily used for farming.

Lysterfield Road is one of the major blackspots in Victoria. When the Victorian State Government fixed it, it cost $2.3m. Further along that road is the City of Knox Avenue of honour, which was first planted in 1918–19 in recognition of First World War veterans. This is a group of pine trees.

A well-known attraction in Lysterfield is the Lysterfield Lake, built in 1929 by the State Rivers & Water Supply Commission, to supply water to the Mornington Peninsula, Springvale, and Dandenong. Lysterfield Lake Park was established as a water catchment area surrounding the lake. Today, there are facilities for sailing, swimming, canoeing, mountain biking and walking. It is one-third in the City of Knox, the rest being in the Shire of Yarra Ranges and a small part in the City of Casey. This park includes a few ruins such as the Donlane and the Dargon homestead site, still with its surrounding orchards and the ruins of the dairy that is renowned as Boy's Farm.

The February 2009 bushfires affected this area; homes were threatened but none were lost.

== Demographics ==
As of the 2021 census, 6,681 people lived in Lysterfield. The median age was 41 and the median weekly household income was A$2,754. 26.1% of the population had a bachelor's degree. 0.6% of the population identified as Indigenous. The most common non-English languages spoken at home include Mandarin (3.6%), Greek (1.6%), Italian (1.5%), Arabic (1.2%), and Sinhalese (1.1%).

== Education ==
There is one primary school in the area named Lysterfield Primary School (situated in Bellfield Drive, Lysterfield). However, the suburb is close to many primary and secondary schools in neighbouring suburbs.

== See also ==
- Shire of Sherbrooke – Lysterfield was previously within this former local government area.
