= Lysterfield Park =

Public park in Victoria, Australia

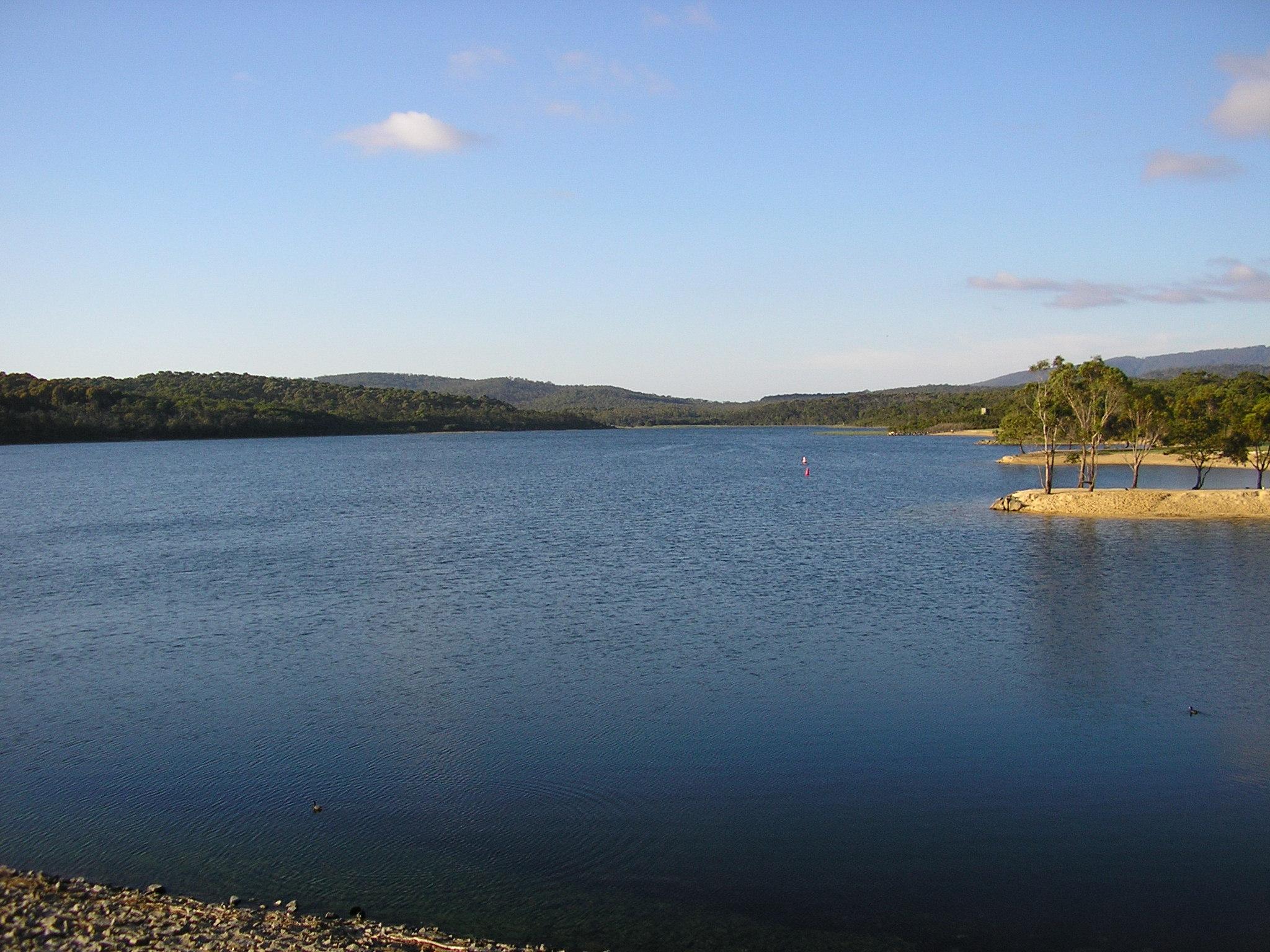
- Lysterfield Lake located within the park

- Location within Victoria
- Location: Victoria
- Nearest city: Lysterfield
- Coordinates: 37°56′56″S 145°17′46″E
- Area: 13.98 km^{2} (5.40 sq mi)
- Established: 19 May 1981
- Governing body: Parks Victoria
- Website: Official website

The Lysterfield Park is a public park located in the Greater Melbourne region of Victoria, Australia. The 1,398-hectare (3,450-acre) park is situated approximately 30 kilometres (19 mi) southeast of the Melbourne central business district, adjacent to the suburb of Lysterfield in the City of Casey. When combined with the adjacent Churchill National Park, the two parks comprise 1,668 hectares (4,120 acres) in the Dandenong Valley and the Dandenong Ranges that are a haven for native birds, mammals and reptiles, and provide recreational opportunities.

Lysterfield Park was created following the decommissioning of the Lysterfield Reservoir (built in 1936) and placement of its catchment under the management of the then National Park Service in 1979. Gazetted on 19 May 1981 with 1,151 hectares (2,840 acres), extensions to the park were made in 1984, 1988, 1995 and 1997.

== Features ==
Lysterfield Park was the venue for mountain biking events of the 2006 Commonwealth Games.

It features a wide array of trails suitable for XC and trail MTB riding. The trails are well signposted and give clear indication of the level of difficulty they present to the rider. Trail management over recent years 2012 - 2015 has led to vastly improved drainage, usage of natural and man-made features and as a result trail conditions are much improved.

In 2008, several emergency markers were installed in the park to allow callers to emergency services to give their location more precisely.

== See also ==
- Protected areas of Victoria
