= 88.6 FM =

FM radio frequency

This is a list of radio stations that broadcast on FM frequency 88.6 MHz:

== Australia ==
- Plenty Valley FM, Melbourne

== Austria ==
- Radio 88.6, Vienna

== China ==
- CNR The Voice of China in Shigatse and Weinan

== Indonesia ==
- Rhema 88.6 FM, Semarang

== Malaysia ==
- Hot FM in Kota Bharu, Kelantan

== Netherlands ==
- SLAM!FM in Rotterdam, South Holland

== New Zealand ==
- Radio Active, Wellington

== Pakistan ==
- Rasta FM 88.6, in Lahore

== Poland ==
- Radio RSC, Skierniewice

== Tonga ==
- Radio Nuku'alofa, Nuku'alofa

== United Kingdom ==
- BBC Radio 2 in Borders, Bridgend, Great Glen, Hereford, Lancs, Milton Keynes, Penicuik
- BBC Radio Sheffield in South Yorkshire
