= 3MDR =

Coordinates: 37.928713°S 145.445149°E

3MDR 97.1 FM

Australia
- Frequency: 97.1 MHz FM

Programming
- Language: English
- Format: Regional Community Radio

Ownership
- Owner: (Mountain Districts Radio Inc (Not for profit))

History
- First air date: 5 August 1985 (First ever broadcast date)

Links
- Website: www.3mdr.com

3MDR is one of many community radio stations broadcasting in Melbourne, Victoria, Australia. covering the Shire of Yarra Ranges and Shire of Cardinia from a studio located in Upwey.

3MDR broadcasts locally on the frequency of 97.1fm – listeners from all over the world can tune in online @ www.3MDR.com. The main aim of 3MDR is to provide an independent community voice for the Mountain District area, with interactive local news, culture, entertainment and emergency alerts.

3MDR mountain district radio 97.1fm is a community broadcaster based east of Melbourne in the forest-covered mountains of the Dandenong Ranges. From a homely little studio in Upwey, 3MDR broadcasts across the Mountain District area, reaching out to the communities of Ferntree Gully, Upwey, Monbulk, Silvan, Gembrook, Pakenham, Beaconsfield, Belgrave, Emerald, Cockatoo and everywhere in between. The signal can be picked up much further away and can be webstreamed online anywhere in the world (with the necessary implements, computer, internet etc.).

In 2013 3MDR won the Community Broadcasting Association Australia's 'Contribution to Australian Music' Award, sponsored by APRA, for the A Mountain of Sound project – an annually released triple disc compilation CD, featuring 52 songs by 52 artists from Dandenong Ranges, all recorded live by 3MDR.

== History ==
3MDR was granted a broadcasting licence for a medium power community radio service covering the outer eastern region of Melbourne. Initially this coverage area along with that of neighbouring radio station 3VYV (Yarra Valley FM) were intended to form part of the Melbourne Eastern community radio broadcast area, however the areas were divided upon entry of more localised FM community aspirant groups back in the early 1980s.

Mountain District Radio was formed in 1983 as a result of the lack of public communication during the Ash Wednesday fires.

Mountain District Radio was incorporated on 11 December 1985 as a non-profit community operated radio station to service the areas of Monbulk, Woori Yallock, Gembrook, Pakenham, Berwick, Belgrave, Emerald, Cockatoo and everywhere in between

MDR ran 13 test transmissions on the following dates between 5 August 1985 and 29 October 1989.

3MDR's first temporary broadcast - as part of its demonstration phase intended to generate and display a community need for the service, it broadcast from a small studio in the back of an old bus by the side of a water tower on the ridge above Cockatoo.

== Licensing ==
3MDR was the only applicant for a community licence in the outer eastern (mountains) area of Melbourne, and was granted a licence following a short public hearing which took place in 1989. 3MDR was granted a licence on the same day as 3PVR (Plenty Valley - Outer North Eastern Melbourne), 3SCB (Central Southern Melbourne), 3INR (Inner Northern Melbourne), 3SER (outer South Eastern Melbourne), 3WBC (Inner eastern Melbourne) and 3VYV (Yarra Valley, Outer North Eastern Melbourne).

== Current programs ==
3MDR airs a wide variety of programs for all audiences, with something for everyone. The presenters are passionate about broadcasting and are actively involved in the community.

3MDR broadcasts 24 hours a day 7 days a week with programming that includes music, live performances, news and lifestyle, talk-back and local community arts and culture: with specialty music programs that play everything from metal, blues, country, folk to hip-hop. MDR airs a high concentration of Australian music content and supports independent artists.

MDR hosts a wide variety of ethnic programs (Greek, Romanian, Sri-Lankan and more).

MDR is an emergency broadcaster and provides vital bushfire information and potentially life-saving updates on Code Red fire days.

3MDR regularly runs free Community Service Announcements for community groups based in the Mountain District License area, keeping locals in touch with local news.

== Radiothon ==
Each year in November, 3MDR hosts a two-week-long radiothon, supported by a prize draw - offering a range of prizes donated by local businesses to new subscribers. The radiothon is 3MDR's annual membership drive in which listeners are encouraged to ring and pledge their support to the station.
