= Yarra Valley (disambiguation) =

The Yarra Valley is the region surrounding the Yarra River in Victoria, Australia.

Yarra Valley may also refer to:

- Yarra Valley (wine), a wine region located within the Yarra Valley
- Yarra Valley FM, a community radio station which broadcasts to the Yarra Valley region
- Yarra Valley Grammar, independent co-educational school in Ringwood, Victoria, Australia
- Yarra Valley Old Boys FC, a not-for-profit sporting organisation competing in the Victorian Amateur Football Association (VAFA)
- Yarra Valley Railway, a Heritage Railway in the Yarra Valley region
- Yarra Valley Water, a retail water corporation owned by the Victorian Government
- Yarra Ranges Football & Netball League, an Australian rules football league, formerly known as the Yarra Valley Football & Netball League
