= Belgrave, Victoria =

Belgrave
- Suburb
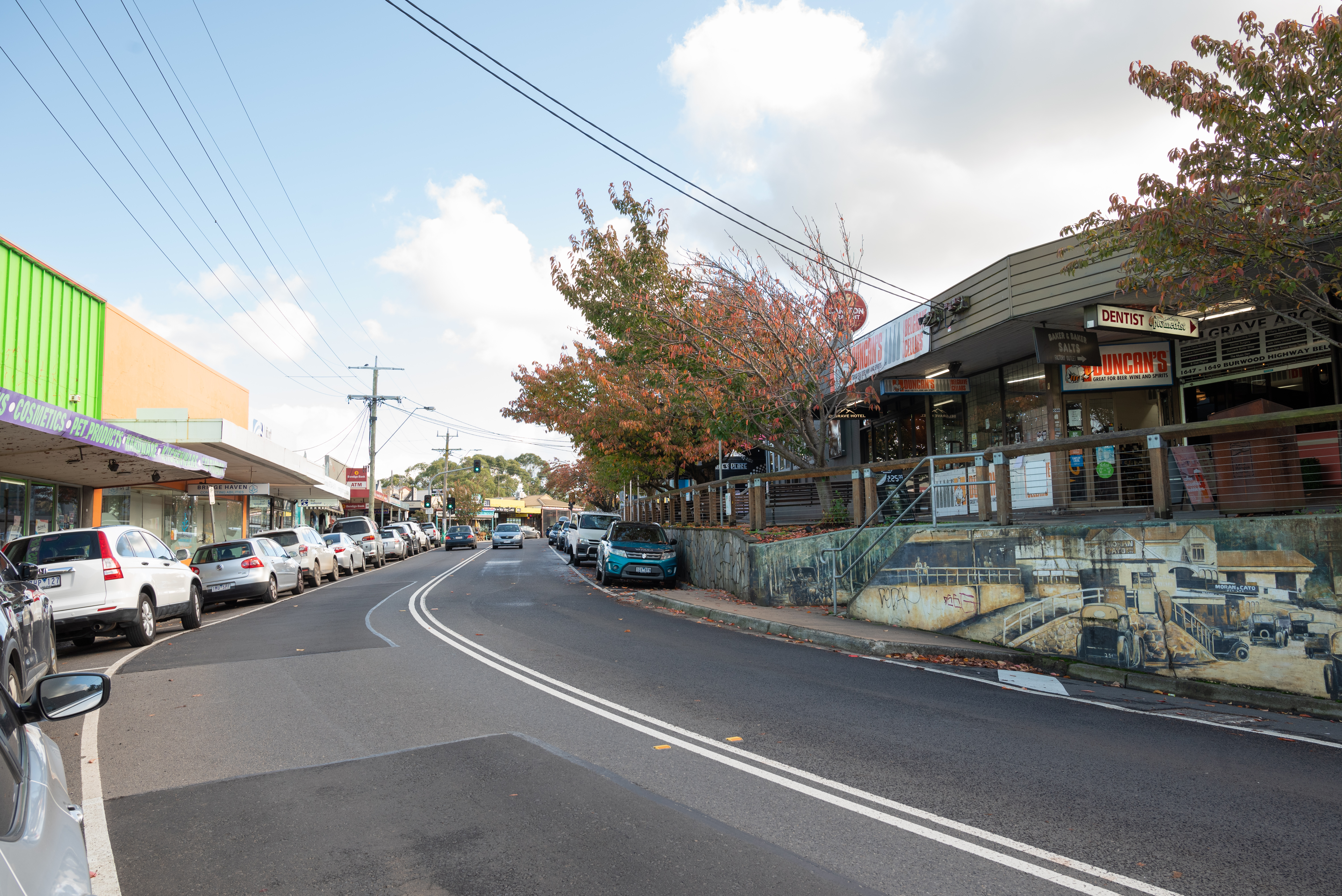
- Belgrave main street (Burwood Highway)

- Interactive map of Belgrave
- Coordinates: 37.912067°S 145.3558°E
- Country: Australia
- State: Victoria
- City: Melbourne
- LGA: Shire of Yarra Ranges
- Location: 36 km (22 mi) from Melbourne; 7 km (4.3 mi) from Ferntree Gully; 11 km (6.8 mi) from Westfield Knox
- Established: 1851

Government
  - State electorate: Monbulk
  - Federal division: Casey

Area
  - Total: 4.1 km^{2} (1.6 sq mi)
- Elevation: 200 m (660 ft)

Population
  - Total: 3,894 (2021 census)
  - Density: 950/km^{2} (2,460/sq mi)
- Postcode: 3160
Suburbs around Belgrave
Upwey	Sherbrooke	Kallista
Tecoma	Belgrave	Selby
Belgrave Heights	Belgrave South	Belgrave South

Belgrave is a town and outer suburb in Melbourne, Victoria, Australia, located 36 km east of Melbourne's central business district, within the Shire of Yarra Ranges local government area. Belgrave recorded a population of 3,894 at the 2021 census.

== History ==
Belgrave is situated in the foothills of the Dandenong Ranges, on the lands of the Wurundjeri people of the Kulin Nation. Belgrave was settled by Europeans in 1851.

Belgrave was named after an 1840s chapel in Leeds, Yorkshire, England; the name was carried by Mr and Mrs R. G. Benson when they came to Melbourne in 1856. Their sons, the Benson Brothers, settled in the Belgrave district in the 1870s. Though originally the area was known as "Monbulk" for the reservoir that lay near by, the town wasn't known as Belgrave until December 1904 when the railway station was renamed, and another suggested name for the town at that stage was Glassford. A Post Office opened in the area around 1904. Many from Belgrave served in the First and Second World Wars, and there is a war memorial in Belgrave. The War Memorial was originally erected in the Main Street and unveiled on August 28 1920, but was moved to Terrys Avenue around July-August 1933 when the street was widened.

=== Belgrave Volunteer Fire Brigade ===
The local fire brigade was established by the local community in 1923. In 2023 it marked 100 years of service to the local community.

=== McDonald's rejection ===
In 1993, the Shire of Sherbrooke prepared a site specific amendment for land adjoining the Belgrave roundabout to facilitate the development of a 70-seat McDonald's restaurant including drive-through. The proposal was unpopular attracting many objections from within the local community. The Panel approved the proposal but disallowed the drive-through. McDonald's decided not to proceed with the development. Application for a nearly identical proposal by the site owner was approved by Yarra Ranges Council in 1996 but lost on appeal at the Victorian Administrative Appeals Tribunal. Despite protests by the locals, McDonald's opened at a site in nearby Tecoma on 7 April 2014.

== Commerce ==
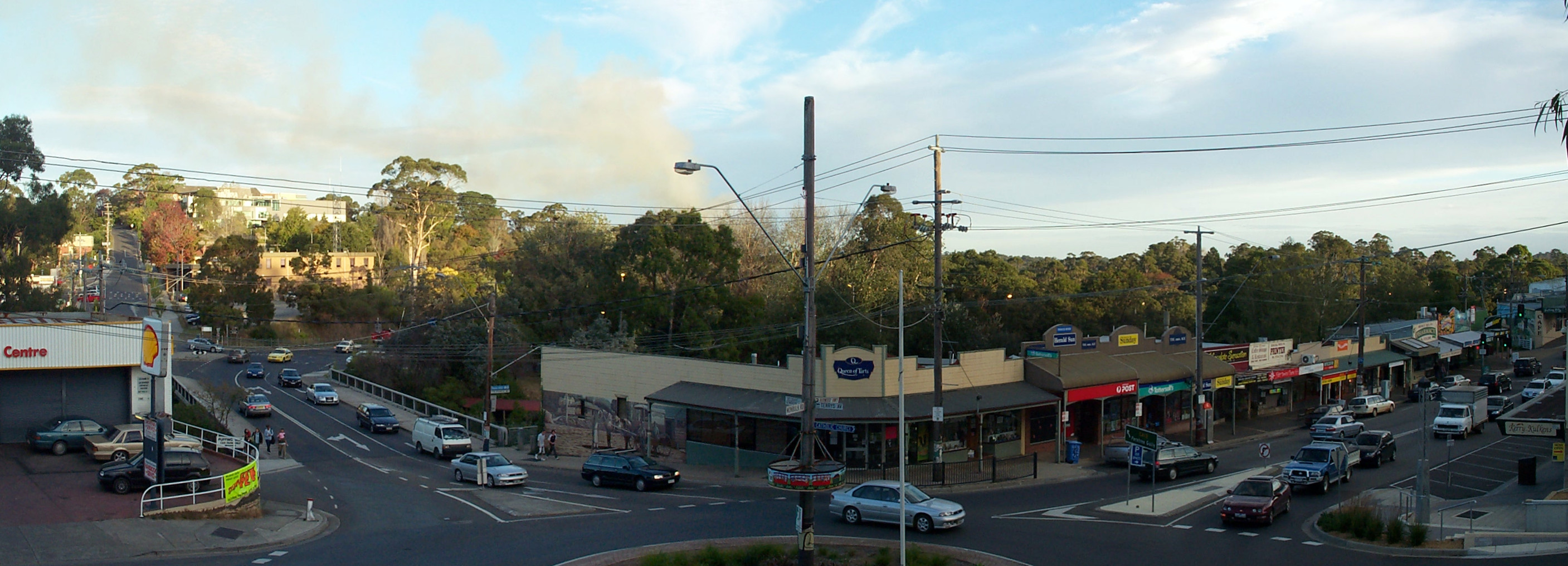
Belgrave commercial district in April 2008

Most of the commercial district of Belgrave is located on Main Street, which is at the end of Burwood Highway. There are also shops on Bayview Road, which is located just across the rail bridge. Belgrave has galleries and bookshops among various other shops and businesses.

=== Puffing Billy Railway ===
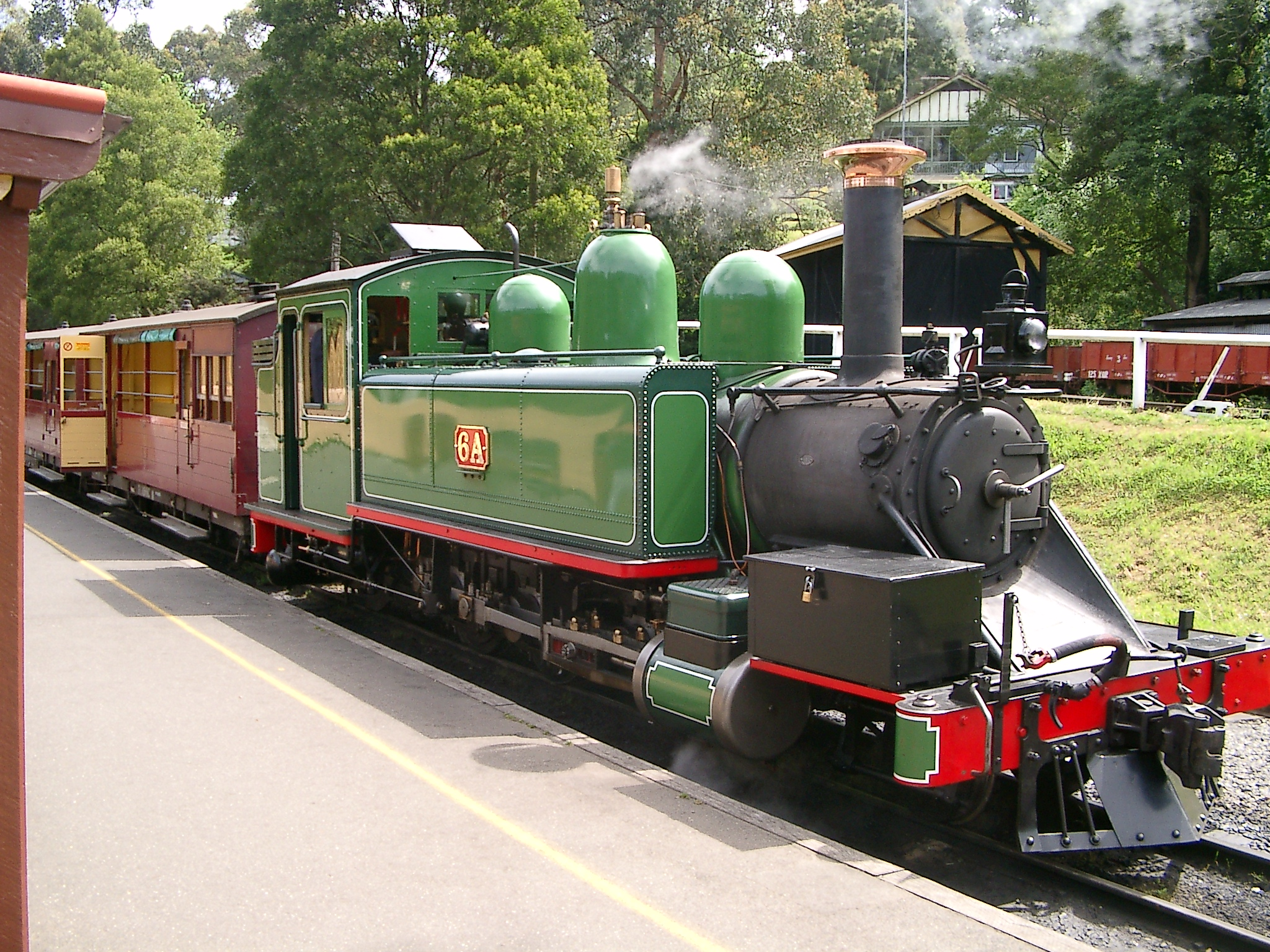
Victorian Railways NA class 6A at Belgrave station in 2002

Belgrave's most notable attraction is the heritage narrow gauge, steam-operated Puffing Billy Railway, which was reopened in 1962—after four years of restoration by volunteers—and travels through 24 kilometres (15 mi) of cool temperate rainforest, semi-urban development and rural farmland to Gembrook.

Heritage listings

Located in Belgrave and added to the Victorian Heritage Register are:

- Some items of the heritage railway rolling stock
- Monbulk Creek Rail Bridge, that carries the heritage railway line

== Special events ==
Belgrave Survival Day is an annual event held on 26 January to honour and celebrate Indigenous and Torres Strait Islander peoples, their continuing culture and heritage.

The Belgrave Lantern Parade, coinciding with the winter solstice, is also held each year. The main street is lined by hundreds of lanterns, accompanied by drummers, dancers and performers.

== Education ==
Belgrave is served by public primary schools in the neighbouring suburbs of Tecoma, Selby and Belgrave South. Upwey High School is the nearest public high school.

Two Catholic schools operate within Belgrave: St Thomas More's Primary School, and Mater Christi College, a girls' secondary school.

== Government and emergency services ==
Belgrave has a police station, which acts as the base for all police stations in the Dandenong Ranges Region. There is also the Belgrave Volunteer Fire Brigade on Bayview Road, which has been serving the community for over 80 years. It is also home to the Dandenong Ranges Fire Brigades Group HQ, from there, the CFA and Parks Victoria used to manage all major fires within the Dandenong Ranges, though this has moved to an Incident Control Centre in Ferntree Gully since the Black Saturday Fires of 2009. There is also an Ambulance station in Bayview Road.

There is a Centrelink office on the high side of Main Street. The State Member for the seat of Monbulk, Daniela De Martino MLA, has her Electoral Office in Belgrave. The closest Shire of Yarra Ranges office is in Upwey on Main Street.

== Sport and recreation ==
The Belgrave Town Park, just below the police station, provides a fine view over the town as well as a public space for events such as the annual Christmas carols. Just off the Belgrave-Hallam Road is the Belgrave outdoor swimming pool, tennis courts and a playground.

The town supports both a cricket and Australian Rules football team which are located at Belgrave Recreation Reserve on Reserve Road. It is also the home ground of the Belgrave Junior Football Club. The Belgrave Cricket Club is affiliated with the Ferntree Gully And District Cricket Association, while the Belgrave Football Club competes in the Yarra Valley Mountain Football League.

Belgrave has a park 3 km from the Main Street. During the summer months, Belgrave Pool is open. Belgrave pool is an outdoor 33m heated pool.

Public reserves in Belgrave include Belgrave Lake Park, Belgrave Recreation Reserve, Borthwick Park, Violet Larsen Reserve and Dandenong Ranges National Park.

=== Belgrave Lake Park ===
A small reserve surrounding Belgrave Lake and located south of Belgrave town centre. It is an important biolink between Dandenong Ranges National Park and Birdsland as well as Lysterfield Lake Park. The park has a combined focus of recreation and conservation. Monbulk creek flows through the area and is important for wildlife such as platypus and water rat. In the trees, arboreal mammals include the sugar glider and also would have been a habitat for the yellow-bellied glider. The reserve is dominated by Eucalyptus cypellocarpa (mountain grey gum) on the slopes. Along the riparian zone (adjacent to creek) the dominant plant species are Eucalyptus viminalis subsp. viminalis (manna gum), Acacia dealbata (silver wattle).

Belgrave Lake was constructed in 1893 to supply water to Dandenong. Water flowed by pipeline to Heany Park in Rowville and then by aqueduct and pipeline through Churchill Park and on to Dandenong. From 1924 water supply to Dandenong was discontinued but the pipeline continued to supply water to farms in the Lysterfield area. Fern Tree Gully Shire leased the pipeline from 1940 to 1950. The pipeline was still in use in the 1970s and was closed some time after that.

== Transport ==
Belgrave railway station is located behind the main street shops, with the steam train Puffing Billy just beyond it. Belgrave suburban electric trains go to Melbourne CBD via Ringwood. Puffing Billy goes to Gembrook.

Bus services are located throughout the suburb, and go to Oakleigh, Lilydale, Gembrook, Olinda, Belgrave South, Upwey.

Major roads include Burwood Highway, Wellington Road, Ferntree Gully Road and Belgrave-Hallam Road, all providing access to the city centre of Melbourne.

== Media ==
Belgrave's local newspapers are The Free Press Leader, and The Ferntree Gully-Belgrave Mail. The local radio station is 3MDR 97.1FM.

== Gallery ==
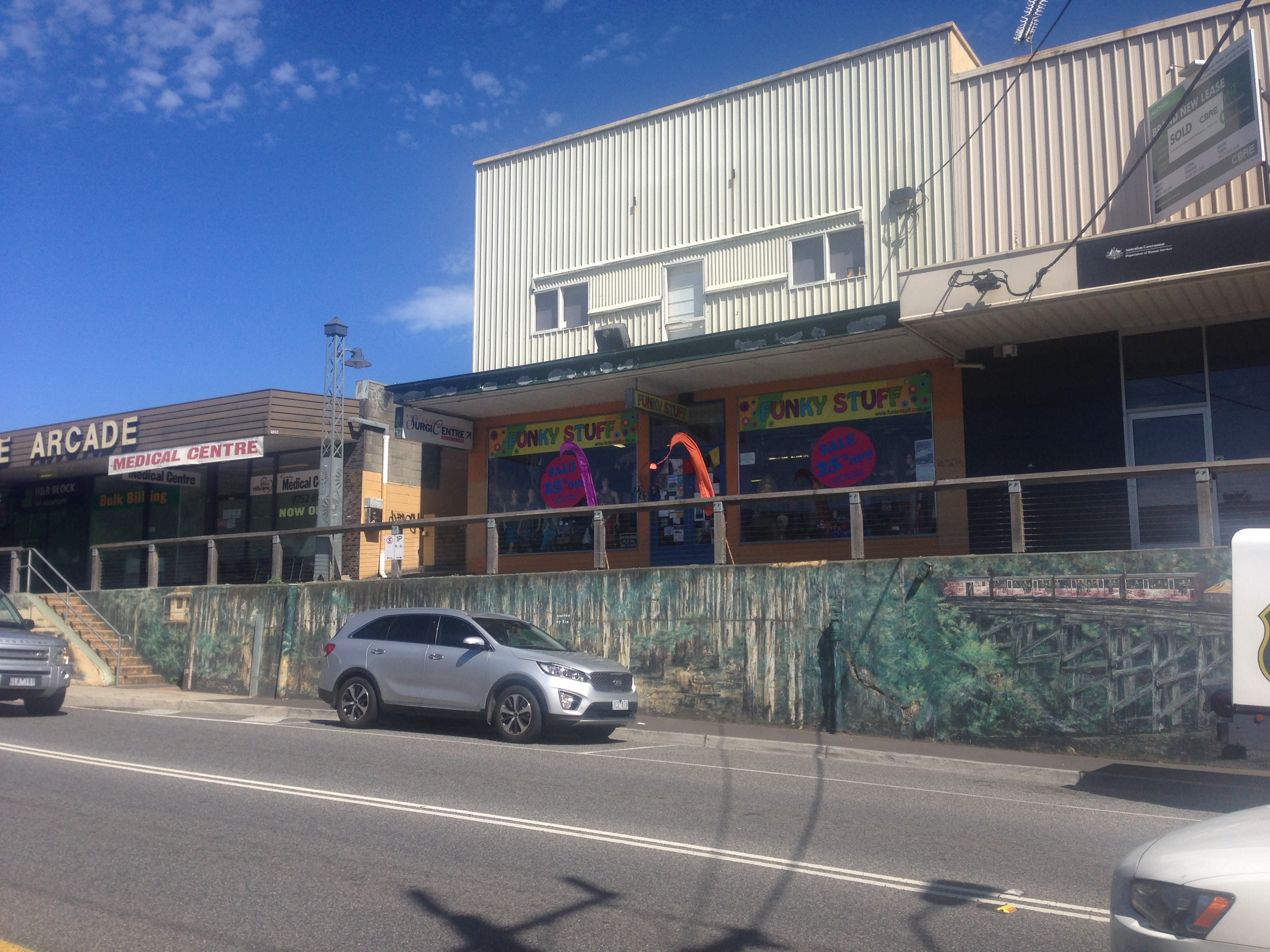

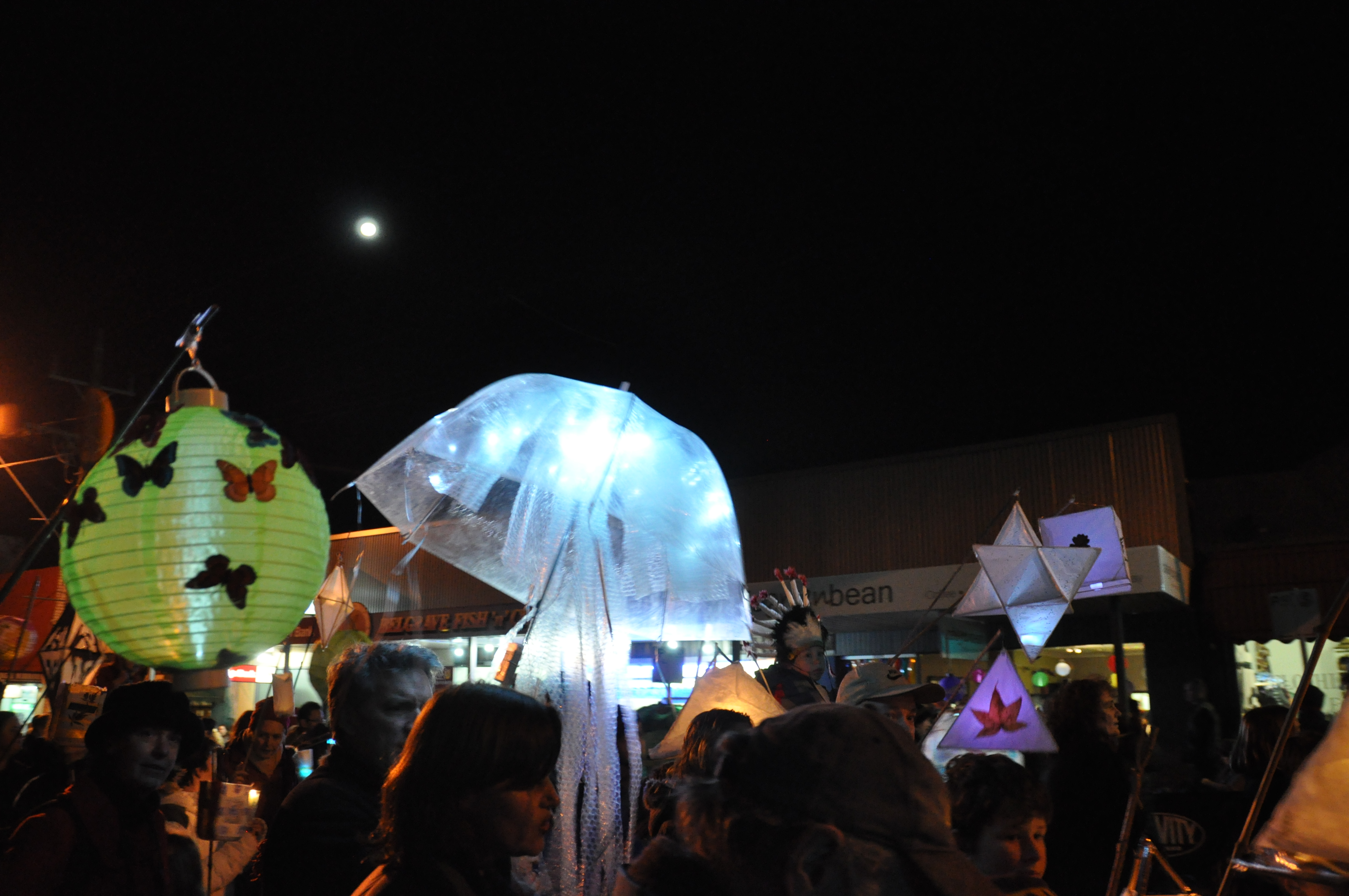

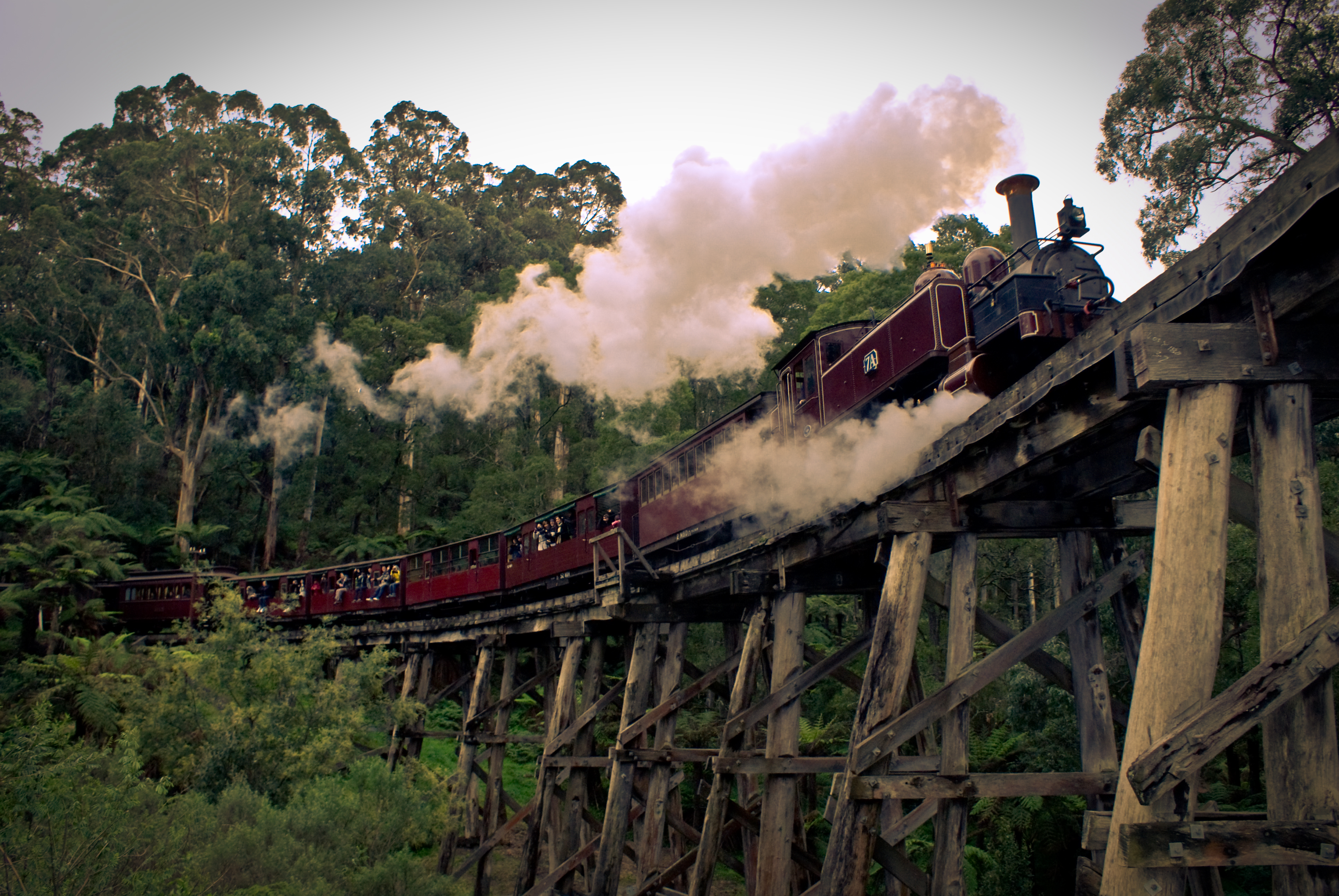

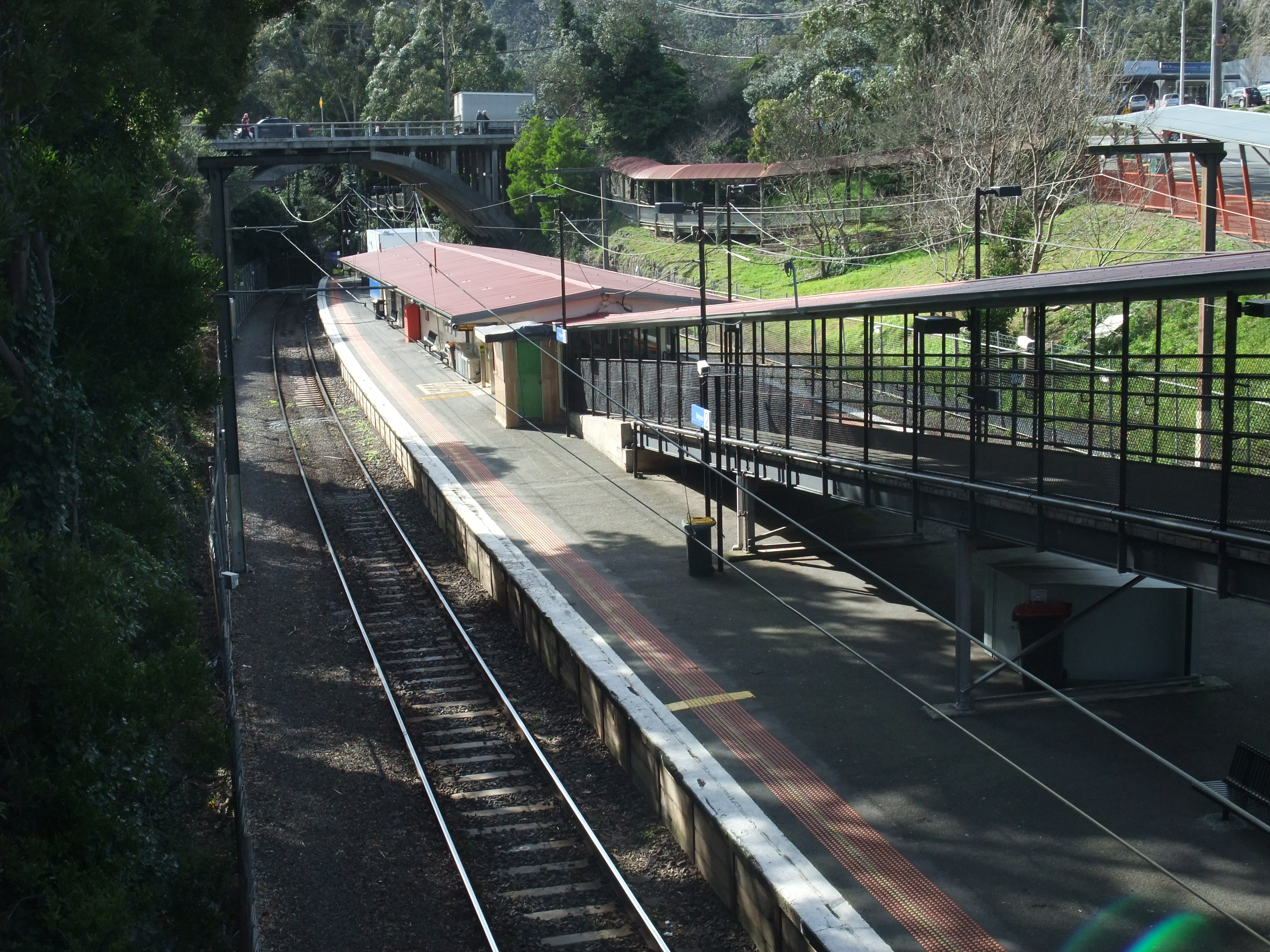

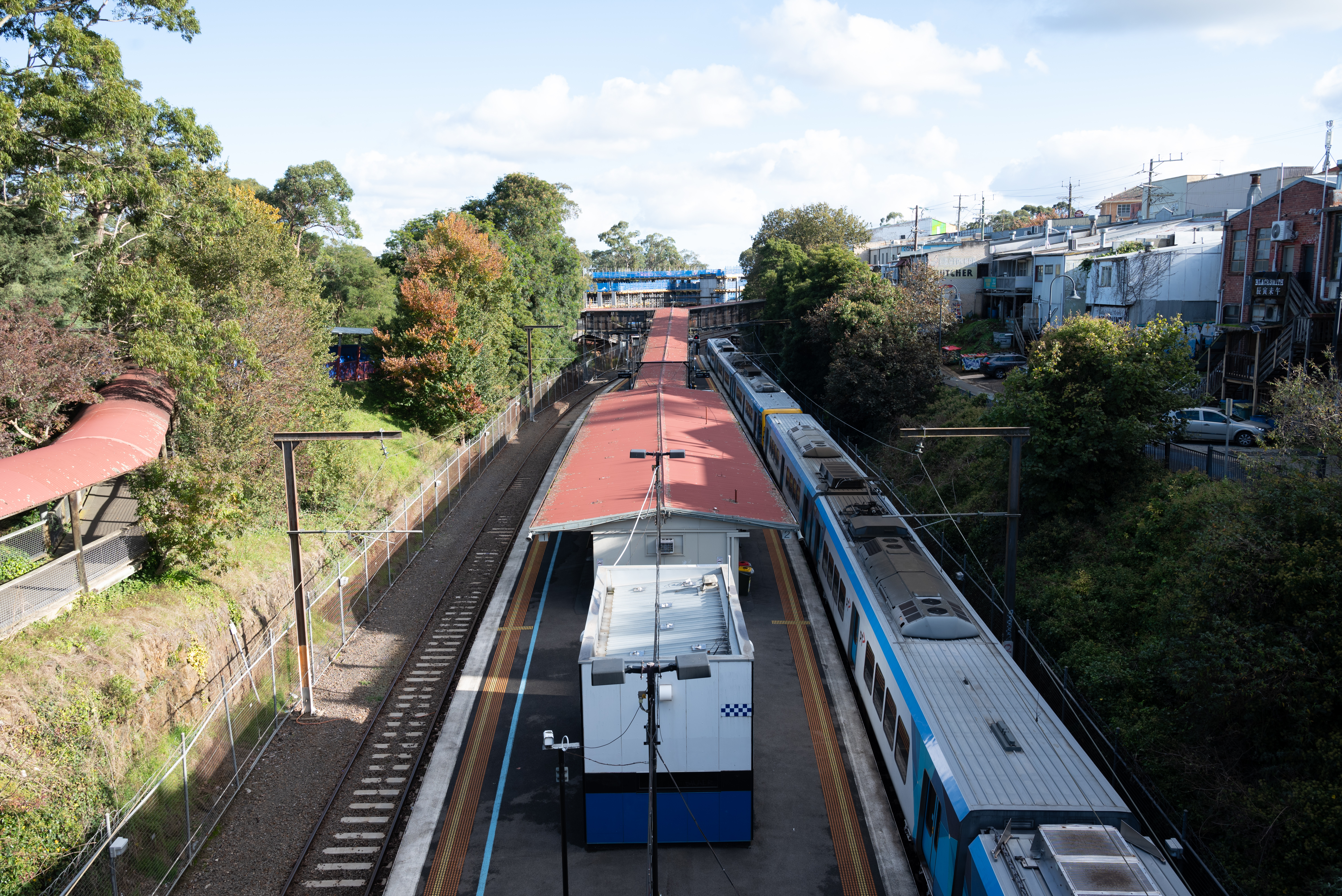

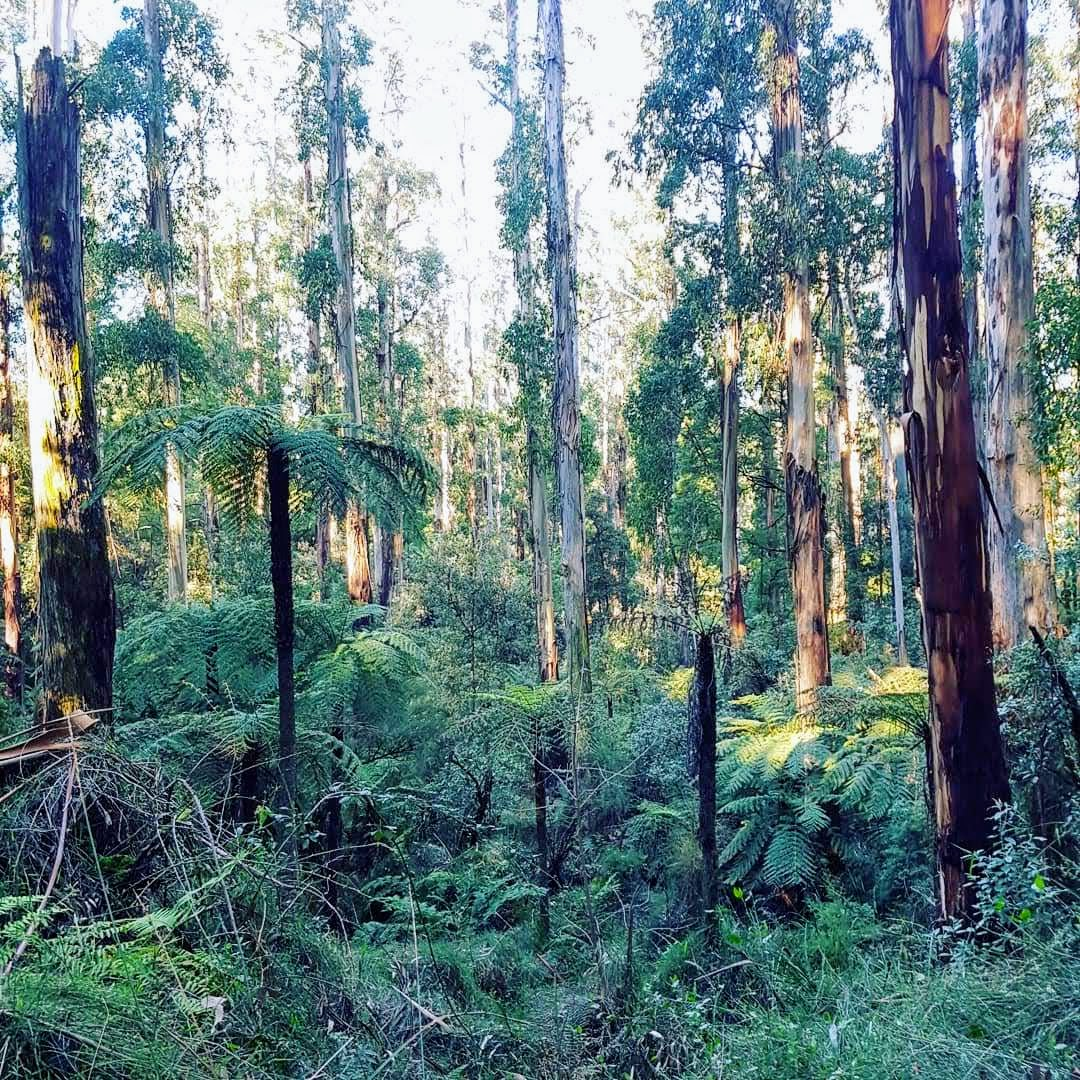

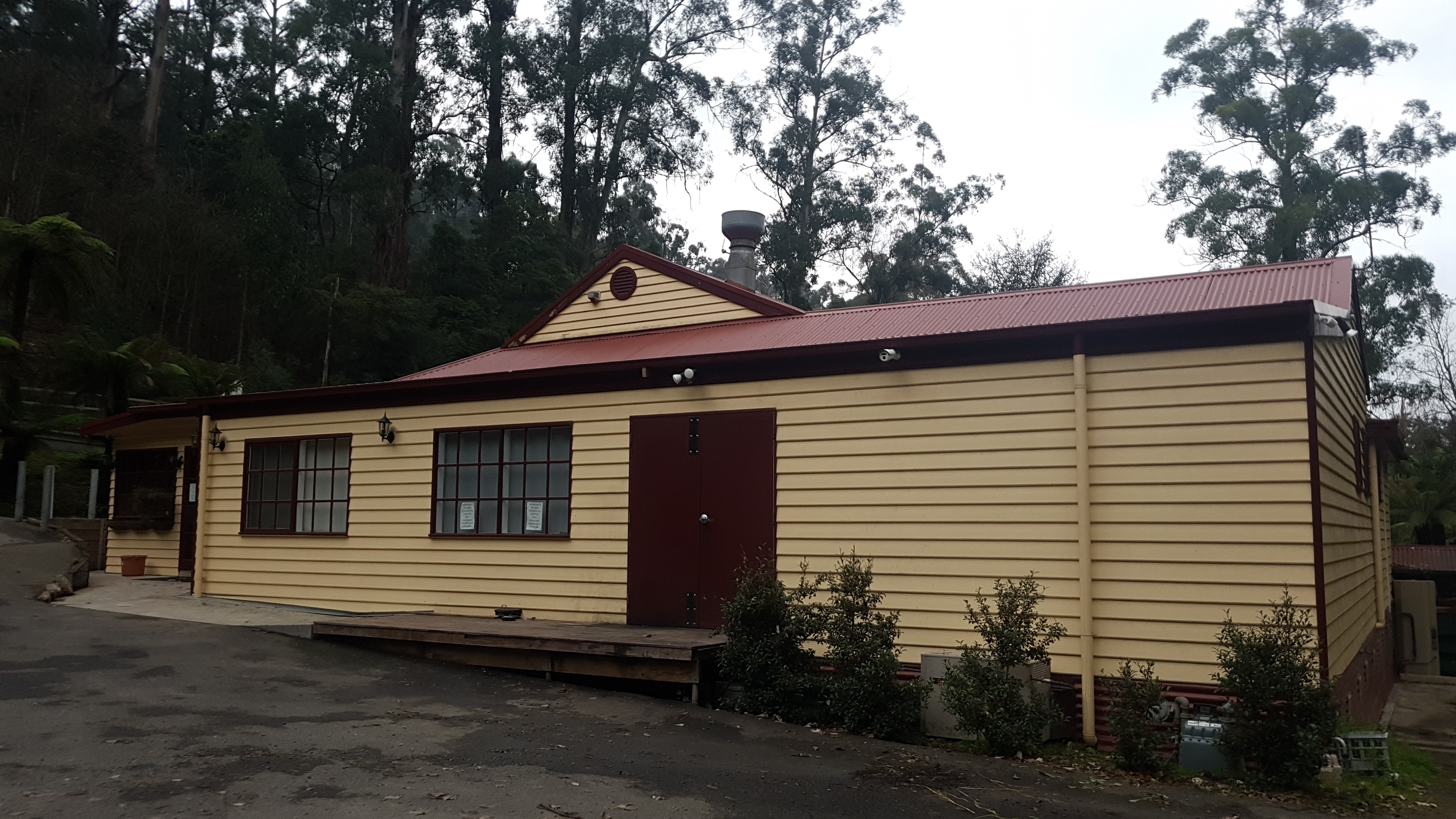

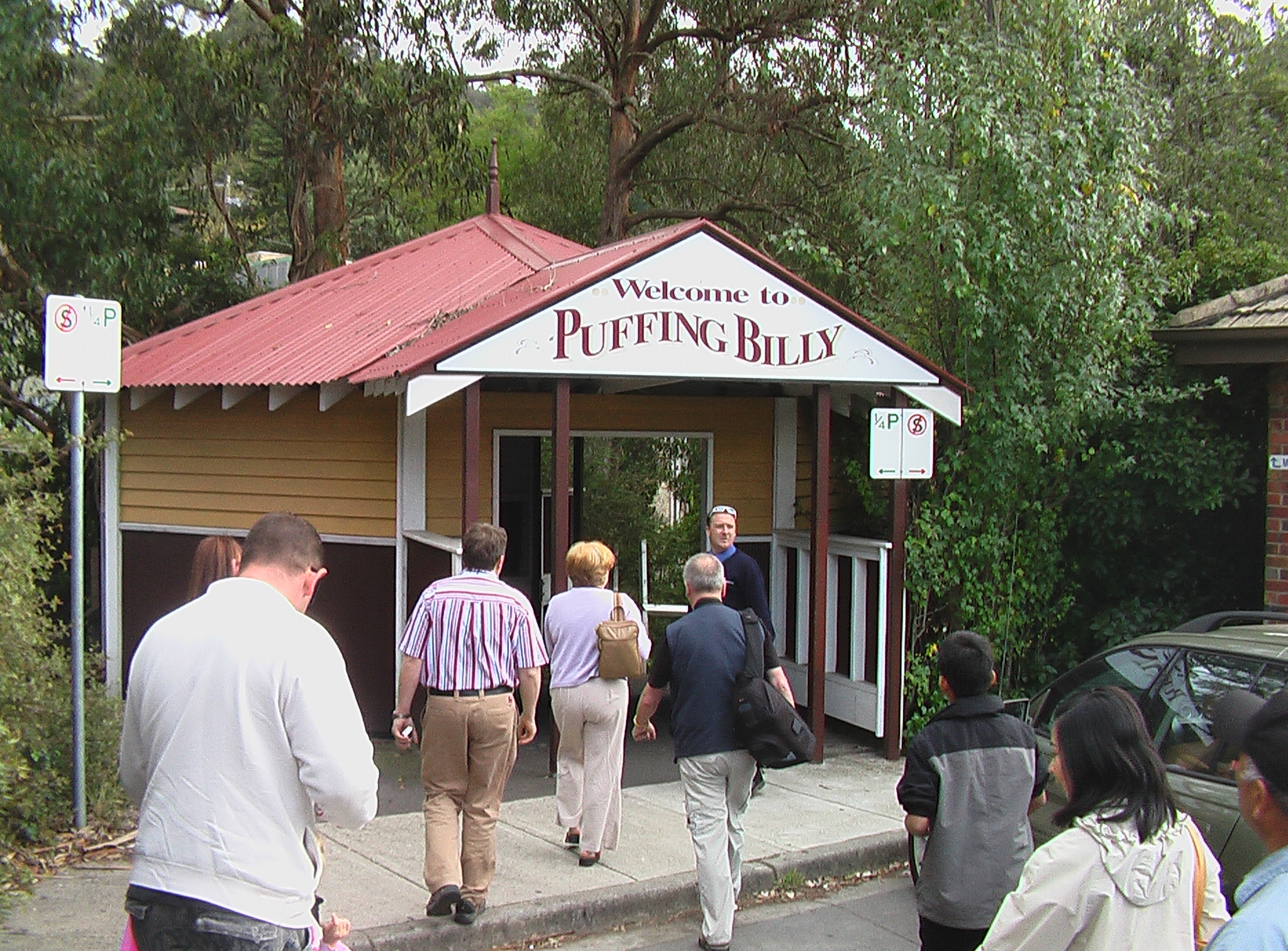

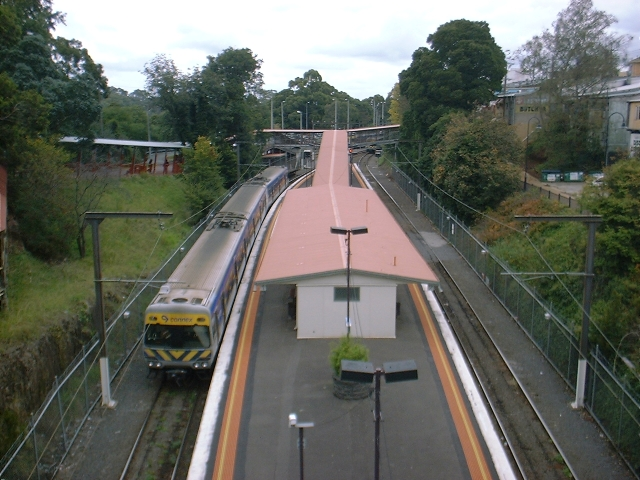

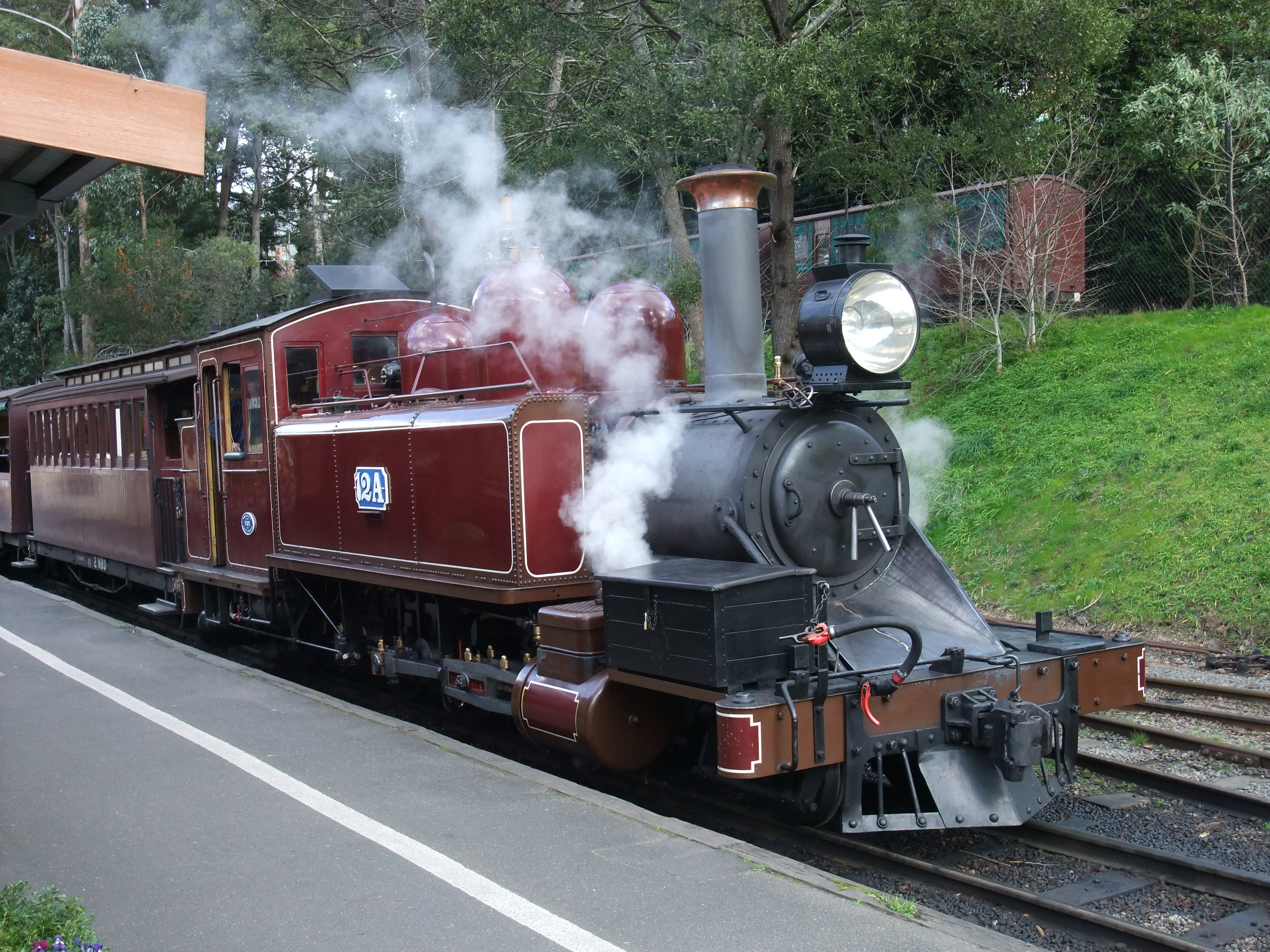

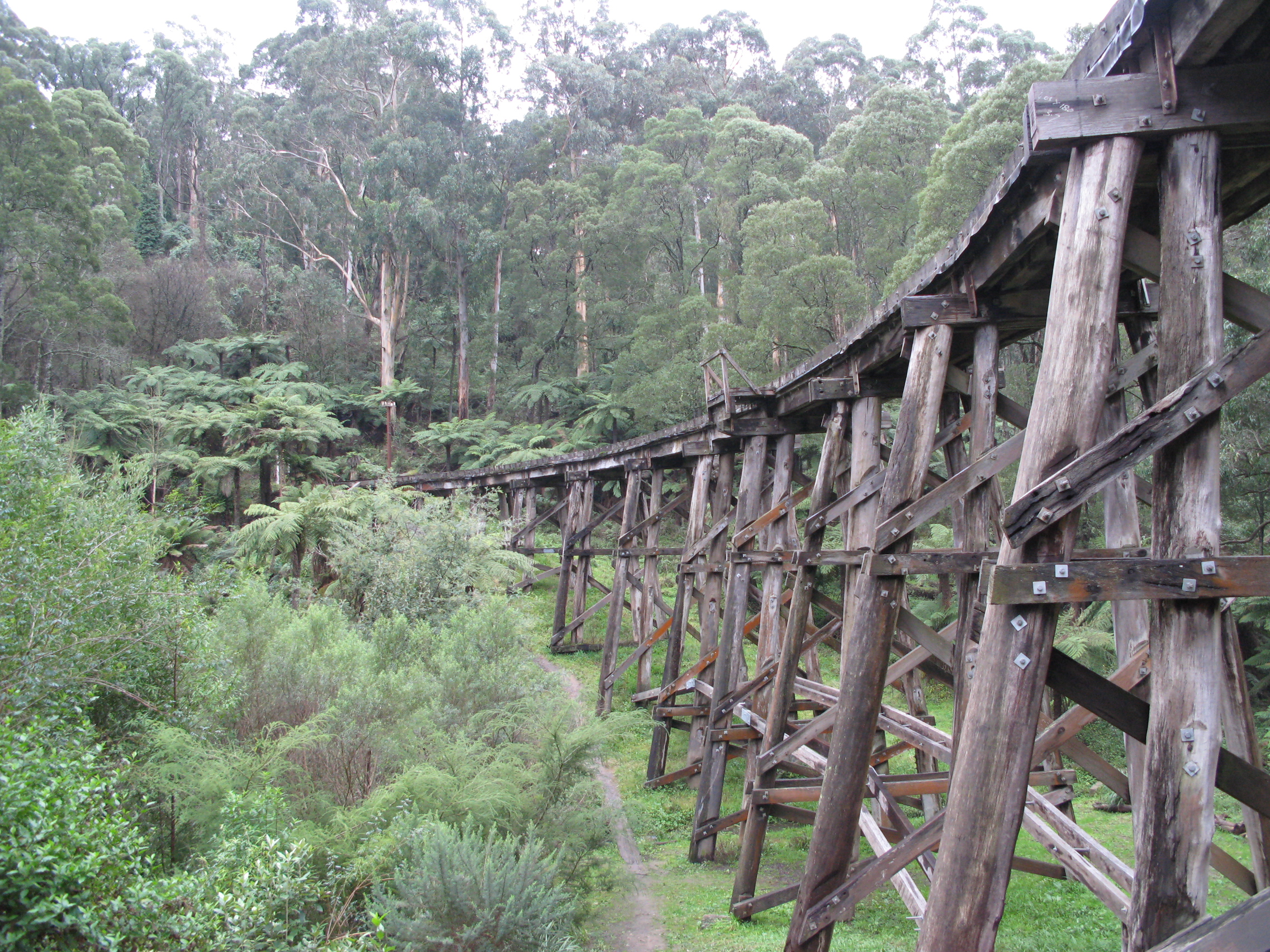

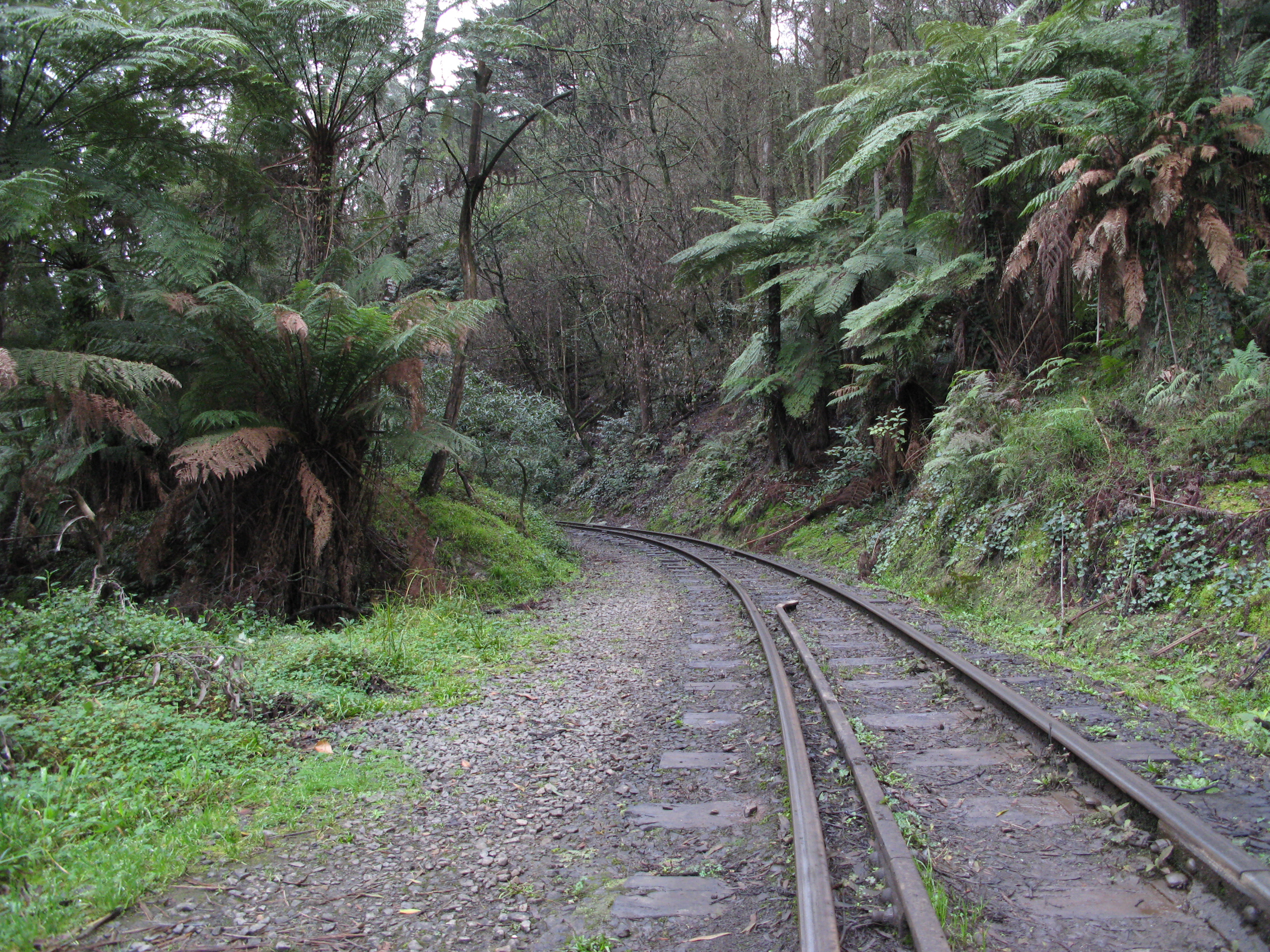

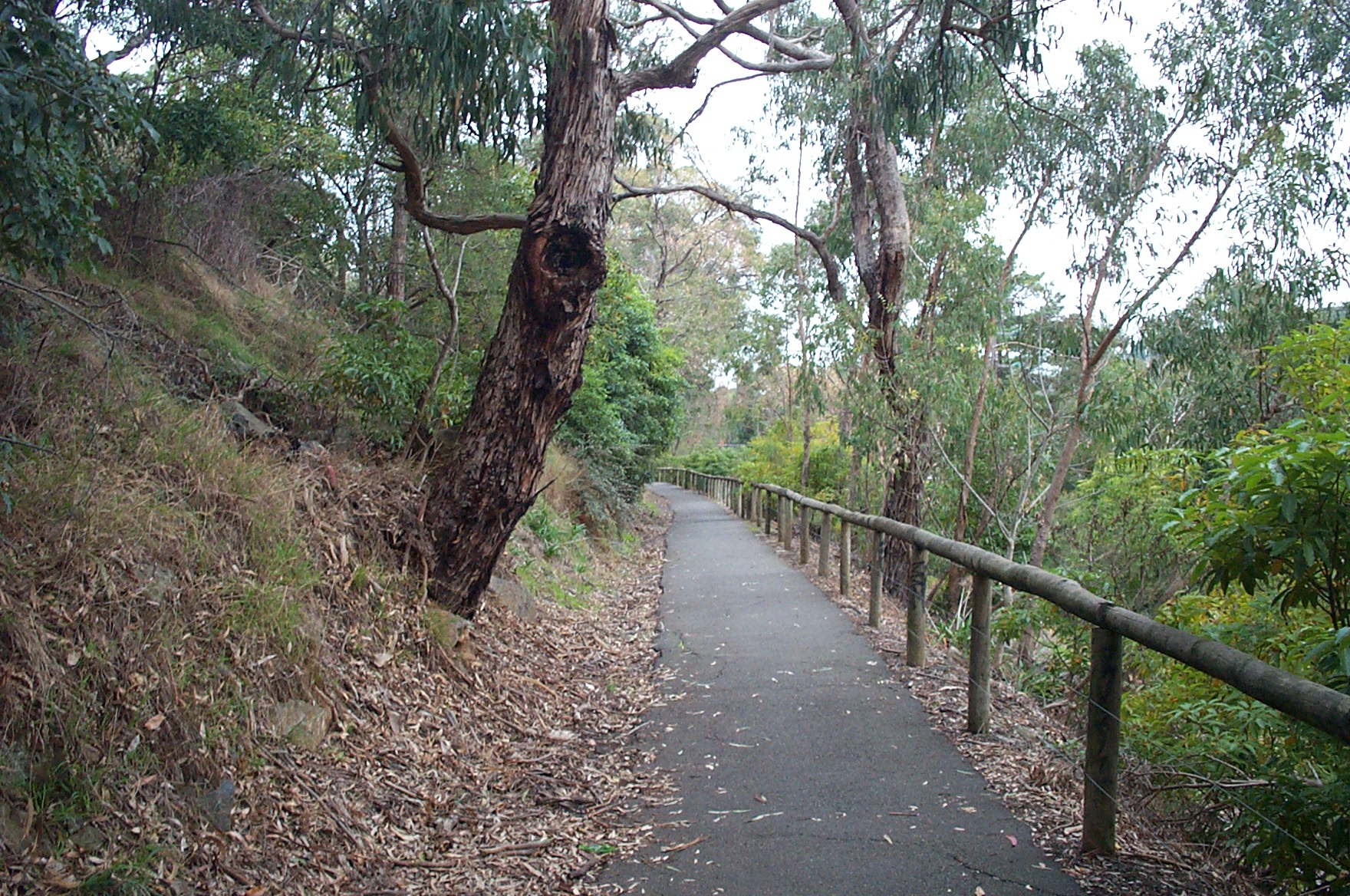

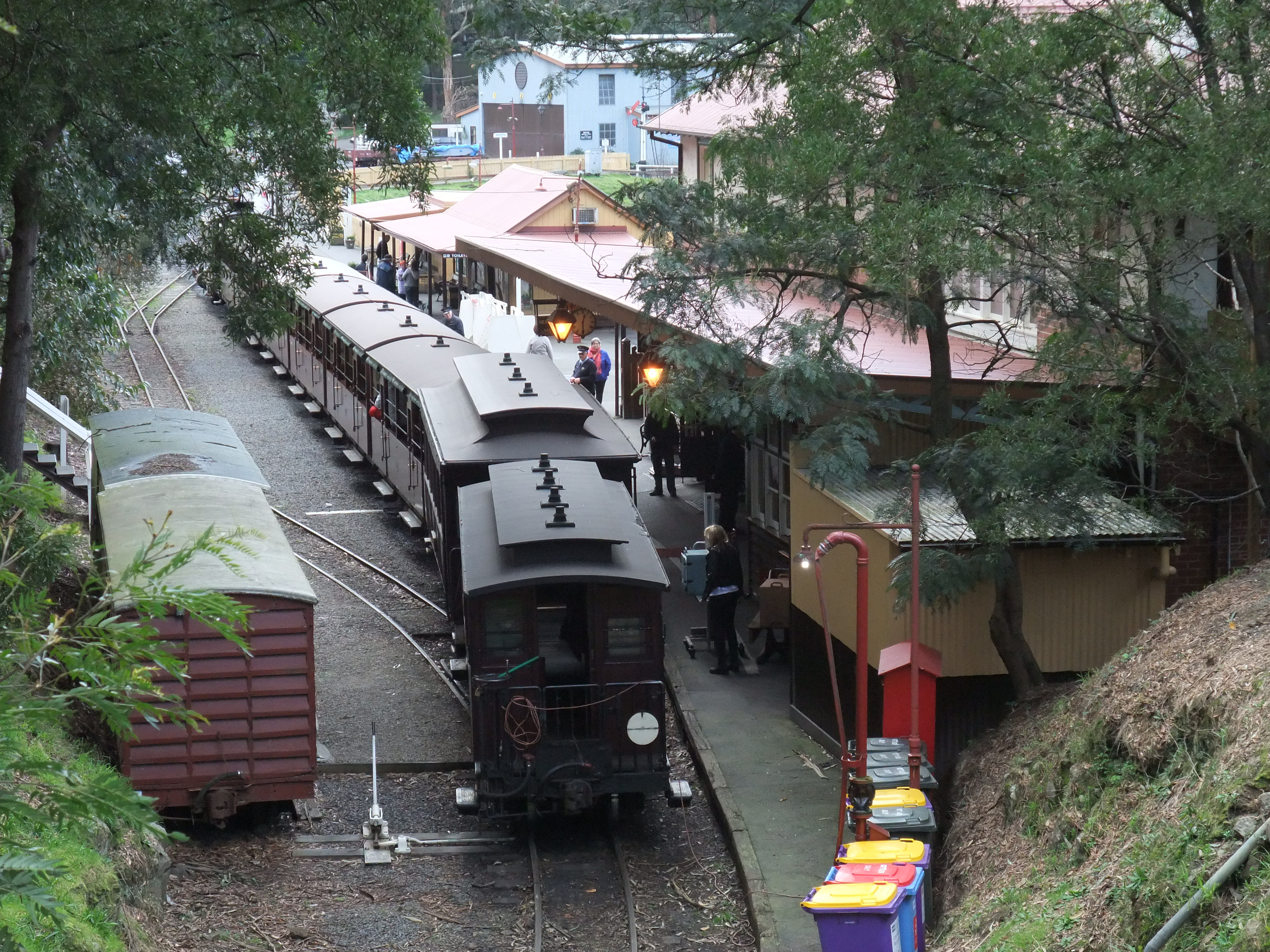

== See also ==
- Belgrave railway line
- Belgrave Lantern Festival
- Puffing Billy Railway
- Belgrave (Puffing Billy) railway station
