= Selby, Victoria =

Selby
- Suburb
- Interactive map of Selby
- Coordinates: 37.914°S 145.369°E
- Country: Australia
- State: Victoria
- City: Melbourne
- LGA: Shire of Yarra Ranges
- Location: 37 km (23 mi) from Melbourne; 1 km (0.62 mi) from Belgrave
- Established: 1901

Government
  - State electorate: Monbulk
  - Federal division: Casey

Area
  - Total: 2.5 km^{2} (0.97 sq mi)
- Elevation: 250 m (820 ft)

Population
  - Total: 1,626 (2021 census)
  - Density: 650/km^{2} (1,680/sq mi)
- Postcode: 3159
Suburbs around Selby
| Sherbrooke | Kallista | Kallista |
| Belgrave | Selby | Menzies Creek |
| Belgrave Heights | Belgrave South | Menzies Creek |

Selby is a suburb in Melbourne, Victoria, Australia, 37 km east from Melbourne's central business district, located within the Shire of Yarra Ranges local government area. Selby recorded a population of 1,626 at the 2021 census.

The town hosts the second station on the narrow-gauge railway to Gembrook (now the Puffing Billy Railway).

== History ==
The settlement of Selby occurred in conjunction with Menzies Creek, a short distance to the east. After the narrow-gauge railway opened in 1900, the provision of a station in May 1904 required a name. Selby was chosen, as a compliment to a local landowner and councillor, George Selby. The post office opened on 1 August 1913, closing in 1994.

The land around Selby is particularly hilly, as evidenced by the curves in both the road and the railway. The eastern side of the township is dominated by the steep Black Hill, on which there is a reserve. Whilst the topography put restraints on farming it attracted tourists and weekenders. In the 1920s Selby's weekend population rivalled Belgrave's, but scarcity of subdivided land drew holiday makers and others away from Selby. Some notable Melburnians built homes in Selby, and the Carlotta Tye memorial Anglican church commemorates the wife of Allen Tye, son of George Tye, owner of a Melbourne furniture emporium.

Selby's proximity to Belgrave ultimately attracted residential subdivisions, and a primary school was built in 1951. The township has several reserves and is home to the first Neighbourhood House in the area. Sadly the general store has been closed for several years.

Following a landslide beyond Selby in 1953, the narrow-gauge railway fell into disuse as a regular railway and was closed the following year, only to be re-opened in 1962 as the current Puffing Billy Railway. Regular trains only stop at Selby if required, but this is rare.

Selby's census population rose from 159 in 1933 to 1,652 in 2016.

Wildlife abounds in and around Selby. King parrots, galahs, yellow-tailed black cockatoos, black wallabies, echidnas, koalas and wombats are often sighted. Visits from barking owls have been recorded as recently as 2005.

=== Heritage listing ===
The following place in Selby is listed on the Victorian Heritage Register:

- Monbulk Creek Rail Bridge, that carries the Puffing Billy Railway line

== Business ==
Selby has, amongst other businesses, a medical practice & creative production agency OBG Productions.

== Facilities ==
Selby contains a CFA fire brigade, established in 1926, whose area of primary protection includes the township of Selby, parts of the Dandenong Ranges National Park, farmland, and other areas of bushland both private and public. A new fire station was built on the existing site and opened in 2019 with a Welcome to Country and Smoking Ceremony by Wurundjeri Elder Uncle Dave Wandin and State Government Minister for Emergency Services, the Hon. James Merlino.

It also includes a community house, established in 1975, which offers community development as well as educational, IT services and other community lead courses.

Selby Primary School was established in 1951. Puffing Billy and the historic trestle bridge are featured on the school logo. The school population has levelled out around 320 students.

== Reserves in Selby ==
Selby Conservation Reserve, Minak Reserve, Myanook Bushland Reserve, Currajong Avenue Reserve, Selby Park, Black Hill Reserve, Black Hill Parade Reserve.
