= Monbulk Creek Rail Bridge =

Heritage-listed rail bridge in Melbourne, Victoria, Australia

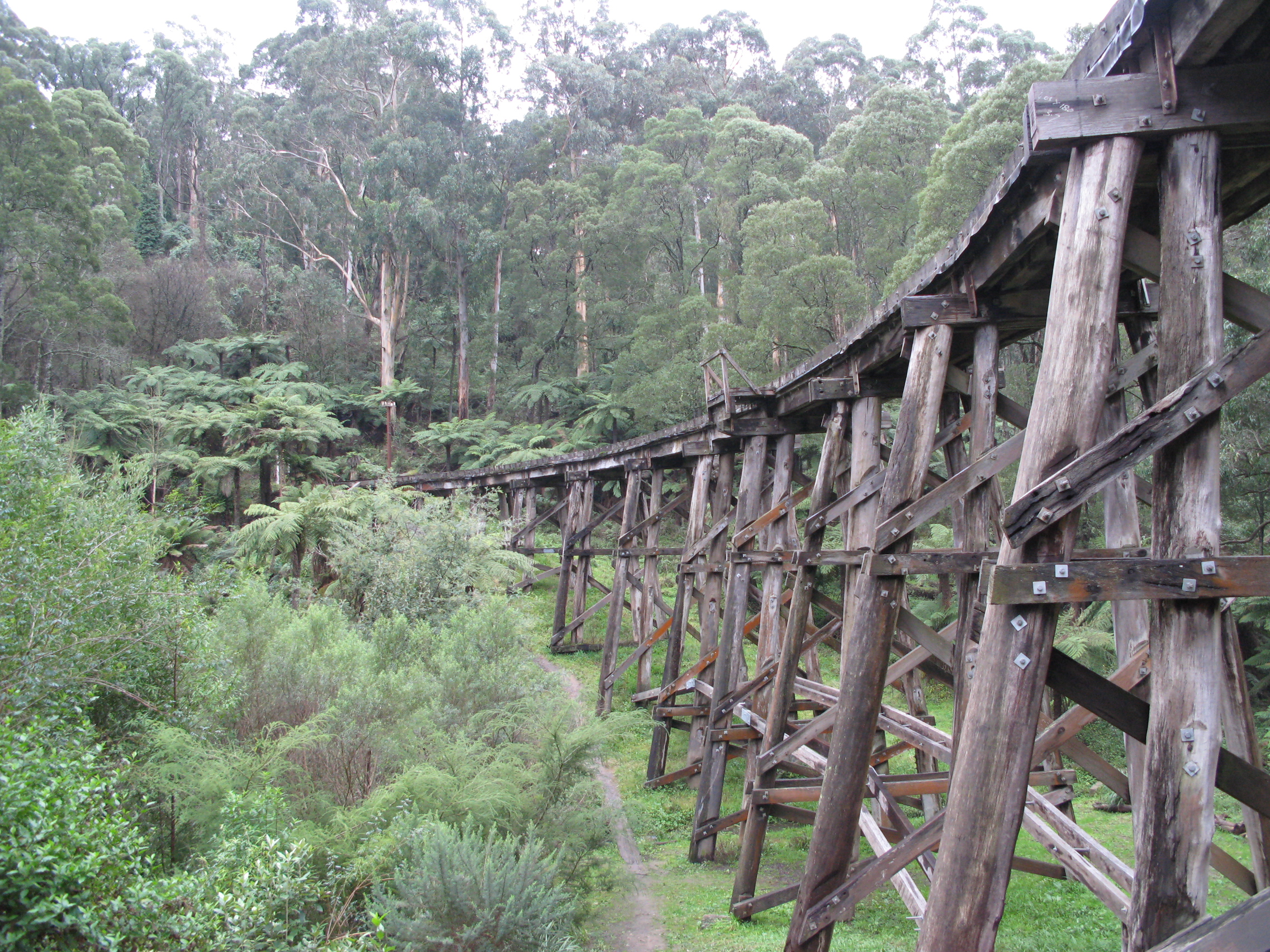
- The trestle bridge in 2018
- Coordinates: 37°54′30″S 145°21′55″E
- Carries: Ferntree Gully-Gembrook line (1899–1954); Puffing Billy Railway (since 1965– )
- Crosses: Monbulk Creek; Belgrave-Gembrook Road
- Locale: Yarra Ranges, Melbourne, Victoria, Australia
- Begins: Belgrave
- Ends: Selby
- Other names: Monbulk Creek Trestle Bridge; Puffing Billy Trestle Bridge; Horseshoe Bridge

Characteristics
- Design: Trestle bridge
- Material: Native timber
- Total length: 85 m (279 ft)
- Height: 12 m (39 ft)
- Longest span: 6 m (20 ft)
- No. of spans: 14

Rail characteristics
- No. of tracks: Single track
- Track gauge: 76 cm (2 ft 6 in)
- Structure gauge: Narrow gauge

History
- Designer: Victorian Railways
- Constructed by: Board of Lands and Works Construction Branch
- Built: 1899; 127 years ago
- Opened: 1900 (VIC Rail); 1965 (tourism)
- Rebuilt: 1980–1981; 1983; 1988

Victorian Heritage Register
- Official name: Rail Bridge, Monbulk Creek, Belgrave-Selby Line
- Type: Registered place
- Designated: 20 August 1982
- Reference no.: H1439
- Heritage overlay no.: HO32
- Category: Transport - Rail

Register of the National Estate
- Official name: Rail Bridge over Monbulk Creek
- Type: Defunct register
- Designated: 21 March 1978
- Reference no.: 16043

Location
- Interactive map of Monbulk Creek Rail Bridge

The Monbulk Creek Rail Bridge, also known as the Monbulk Creek Trestle Bridge, the Puffing Billy Trestle Bridge, and the Horseshoe Bridge, is a railway trestle bridge that carries the Puffing Billy tourist train across the Monbulk Creek and over the Belgrave-Gembrook Road, located between Belgrave and Selby, in the Yarra Ranges, in the north eastern suburbs of Melbourne, in Victoria, Australia.

Built in 1899 on the traditional lands of the Wurundjeri people, the bridge was added to the Victorian Heritage Register on 20 August 1982 in recognition of its historical, social, and architectural significance; and was also added to non-statutory lists by the Victorian branch of the National Trust on 18 September 1975 and the now defunct Register of the National Estate on 21 March 1978.

== History ==
During the 1890s depression, broad gauge railway line construction was not considered economically viable and the Victorian Parliamentary Standing Committee on Railways in 1896 considered alternative railway construction techniques. Following the committee's recommendations, four narrow gauge rail lines were built in Victoria between 1899 and 1916.

In 1899 construction of the Ferntree Gully-Gembrook line began which included the rail bridge, over the Monbulk Creek. Victorian Railways architects designed the line and the Board of Lands and Works Construction Branch employed one hundred and eighty men for a period of sixteen months, many of them local timber workers, as labour. One of the features of the construction of the railway, and in particular the trestle bridge, was the use of construction methods which utilised native bush timbers. These were not in ready supply at this time as the area had been devastated by bushfire in 1898. The narrow gauge line supplied local people with goods and services on a regular basis and provided reliable access to markets for local industries as well as revitalising the tourist industry in the picturesque hills.

In 1954 the narrow gauge line was closed and in 1958 management of the line was handed over to the Puffing Billy Preservation Society. The Puffing Billy steam train services began on the line in 1965 as a tourist concern. In 1977 the ownership of the line was handed over to the Tourist Railway Board.

The bridge was constructed from local, native bush timbers and has undergone progressive replacement of damaged timbers. Major structural repair and conservation works were carried out by Hardcastle and Richards in 1980–1981, in 1983, and 1988. The oldest beam found was dated from 1914 and, most of the piles to about 1922.

== Description ==
View from the creek bed in 1991, with a Puffing Billy Peckett 0-4-0ST steam train service crossing the bridge

The rail bridge over Monbulk Creek is a curved, timber trestle bridge carrying a single narrow gauge track which spans the Monbulk Creek and the Belgrave Emerald Road. A viewing bay has been constructed for tourists, off Belgrave-Emerald Road.

The bridge is 85 metres (279 ft) long, 12 metres (39 ft) high at its highest point and comprises fourteen spans of 6 metres (20 ft), curved to a radius of 20 metres (66 ft). The bridge has a tight 60-metre (3-chain) curvature, giving rise to one of its names, the Horseshoe Bridge.

The bridge carries a single 76-centimetre (2.49 ft) gauge track on a ballasted timber deck. Originally the timber decking of 178-by-102-millimetre (7.0 in × 4.0 in) and 152-by-102-millimetre (6.0 in × 4.0 in) planks, was supported on four timber girders of 483-by-203-millimetre (19.0 in × 8.0 in) cross-section, but these have later been replaced by 508-by-229-millimetre (20.0 in × 9.0 in) and 533-by-229-millimetre (21.0 in × 9.0 in) timbers. The piers are timber with 406-by-178-millimetre (16.0 in × 7.0 in) half caps.

== See also ==
- List of railway bridges in Victoria
- List of places on the Victorian Heritage Register in the Shire of Yarra Ranges
