= Belgrave Lantern Festival =

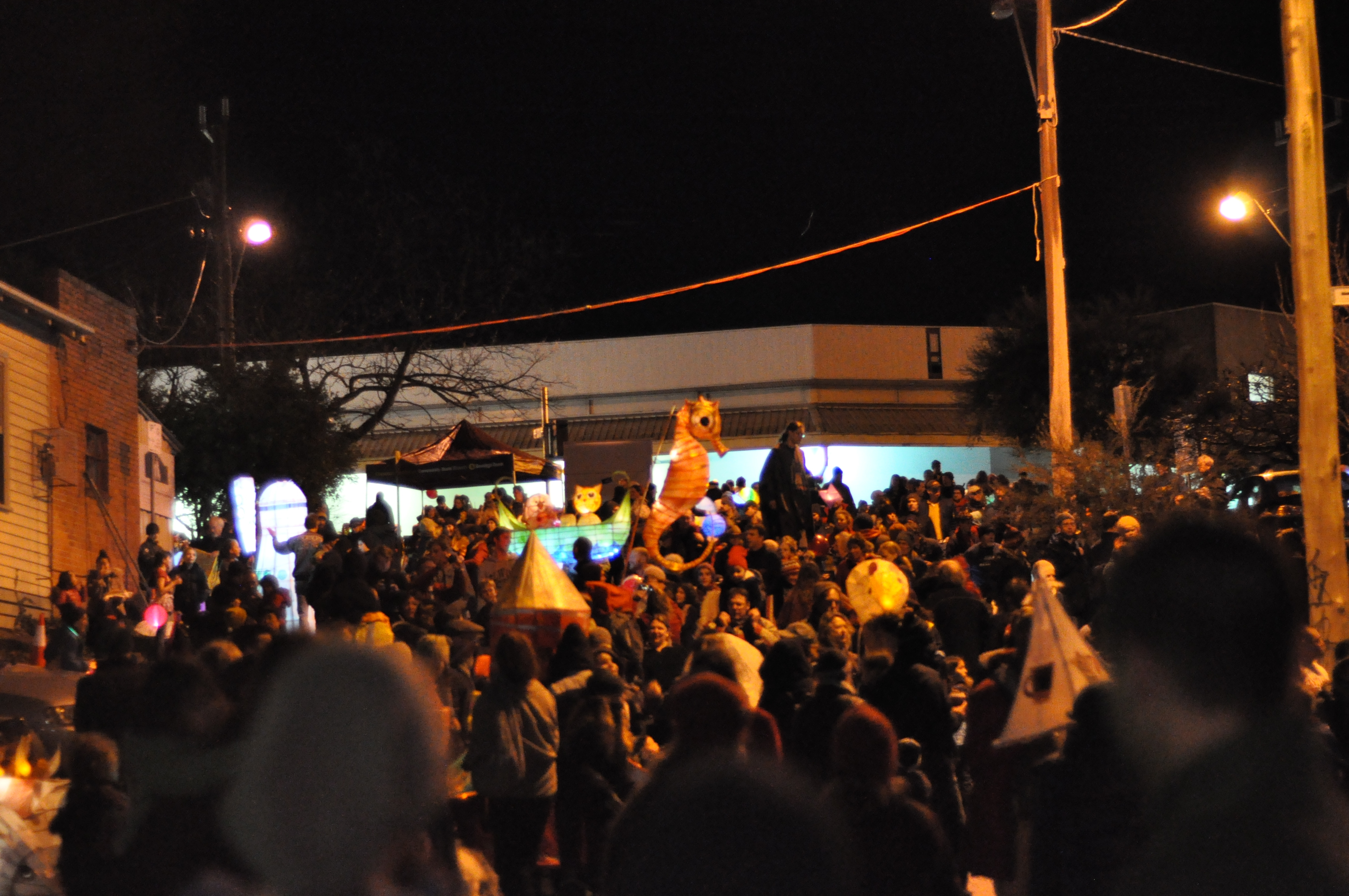
- Crowd at the Belgrave Lantern Festival, 2012
- Date: Saturday closest to the Winter solstice
- Frequency: annually
- Locations: Belgrave, Victoria, Australia
- Years active: 2007 - present
- Most recent: 21 June, 2025

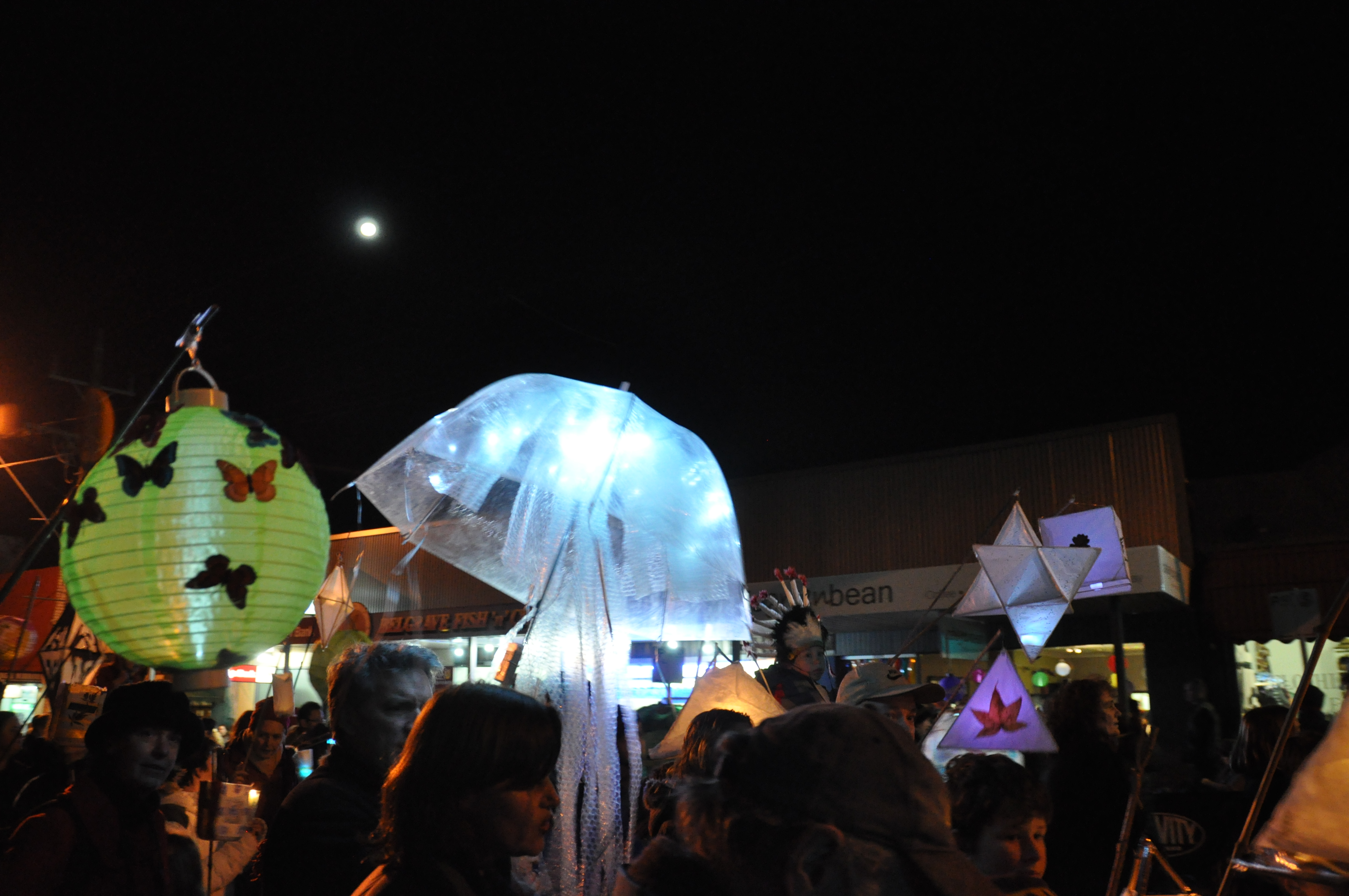
Jellyfish lantern, Belgrave Lantern Parade 2013

The Belgrave Lantern Festival is an annual celebration of the winter solstice in Belgrave, Victoria, held since 2007. The event takes place throughout the evening of the Saturday closest to the Winter solstice along the Burwood Highway. The festival includes a parade, featuing a display of hundreds of homemade lanterns and attracting thousands of visitors.

There are many lantern making workshops held before the parade from around March at the Belgrave Library and other places such as primary schools like Belgrave South Primary School. The parade is open for everyone who has brought a lantern, and there are entertainers such as belly dancers, fire twirlers and the Ruccis Circus that perform before the parade begins. The lanterns that are brought are a range of sizes, with some so big their owners have to wear them. People start arriving in Belgrave from about 4 pm where they can enjoy bands, choirs and food stalls. The people wishing to take part in the actual parade part of the night are asked to gather in Hayes car park by 5 pm. After the parade, Belgrave Library hosts storytime for children at 7 pm with other activities as well such as face painting There are some lanterns that are remembered by the annual parade-goers such as a Dalek and a TARDIS from the british television show Doctor Who. Some other memorable ones are the fauna inspired lanterns such as the cockatoo, dragonfly and frog.

This festival was held virtually in 2020-21.

== See also ==
- Belgrave, Victoria
- Belgrave travel guide
