= Road and Street Traffic Awareness =

Pakistani Radio

Road and Street Traffic Awareness (RASTA 88.6 FM) is a radio station in Lahore, Pakistan that broadcasts traffic information and awareness about safe road use 24 hours a day on 88.6 MHz on the FM broadcast band. It is the first 24-hour traffic program in Pakistan. The station was funded and constructed by United Team Network Technologies (UTNT), a Pakistan-based system design and integration firm. It is staffed by members of the Lahore Traffic Police. RASTA facilities include:

- Integrated control room
- 24/7 traffic helpline
- Website showing live traffic conditions in map and in tabular form
- Commercial free FM 88.6 traffic radio
- Traffic cameras connected with control room
- Variable messaging systems (VMS)
- Traffic messaging
- Automated phone service for traffic update
- Educational resources regarding Pakistan driving laws

A second phase is planned that will include cable and satellite television channels.
