= 3WBC =

3WBC 94.1FM
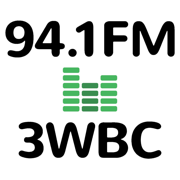
- Box Hill, Australia; Australia
- Broadcast area: Melbourne's Inner Eastern Suburbs
- Frequency: 94.1 MHz FM

Programming
- Format: Community Focus Radio

Ownership
- Owner: Whitehorse Boroondara FM Community Radio Incorporated.

History
- First air date: 2001

Technical information
- Class: Community
- Transmitter coordinates: 37.8276°S 145.1134°E

Links
- Webcast: Test Stream
- Website: www.3wbc.org.au

3WBC FM is a local radio station in Melbourne, Australia with a frequency of 94.1 MHz. The station is operated under licence by Whitehorse-Boroondara Community FM Radio Incorporated. It often involves local school students in its programs and is developing a larger audience. Discussion topics include current events such as global warming.

Since November 2007, 3WBC has broadcast from studios in the Box Hill town hall, located in Box Hill, a suburb of Melbourne.

== History ==
The Inner Eastern suburban area (that being the area comprising the then cities of Box Hill, Camberwell, Hawthorn and Kew or the cities of Boroondara and Whitehorse) was without a local radio service at the time of the formation and development of the suburban community radio groups such as SCB, ECB, VYV, MDR, etc.

The Inner Eastern municipal areas lacked local service and were designated by the then ABA as a potential new area prior to licensing of the first group of Sub-Metropolitan stations offered to Southern Community Broadcasters as an addition to its licence area.

Southern Community Broadcasters – after AGMs and resolutions had after an initial interest in the addition of the area to its own, had rejected the proposal – claiming the Inner East was not an area that shared the Bayside / Inner South identity.

This left options open for a local community radio service to cover the Inner eastern suburbs of Melbourne

When a 5-watt transmitter was first installed on top of the water tower at the corner of Canterbury and Elgar roads, it would have been difficult to imagine the 3WBC studios that now used at the Box Hill Town Hall.

The first test broadcast used an endless tape recording of radio's early presenters talking of their forthcoming shows and the type of music they would be broadcasting.

The second test broadcast was from the old Bennettswood Primary school, at the back of Deakin University, using a 100-watt transmitter borrowed from NEC in Mulgrave. This was a two-week broadcast using second hand and borrowed equipment.

With the amalgamation of councils, a name change became necessary to incorporate the city of Boroondara. The next two test broadcasts were from the Whitehorse Plaza Shopping centre, moving to the Box Hill Central Shopping centre for broadcast number five. This broadcast was a complete success and all involved were elated with the results.

3WBC was granted a full-time community broadcasting licence in September 2001, continuing to broadcast from what had been the front bedroom of a suburban house.

Since November 2007, 3WBC has broadcast from studios in the Box Hill town hall, located in Box Hill, a suburb of Melbourne.

== Programming ==
3WBC has a wide range of programming. This ranges from community news, ethnic programming and local sport, right through to environmental and sustainable living programs and a wide range of music.

=== Sport ===
In 2008, 3WBC began broadcasting VFL football. All Box Hill Hawks home games were broadcast as this team represents the only VFL team in 3WBC's broadcast area.
In 2009 all Box Hill Hawks games will be broadcast. Producer of broadcasts is Phil Edwards. Paul Hooper has put together a great commentary team including Ben Brady as Host, Paul Hooper, Nat Edwards, Brendan "The Rashman" Hooper, Shaun Kelly and Chris Vernuccio.

The 2014, Commentary Team consisted of Paul Hooper, Peter Holden, Neil Butler, boundary rider Dougal Austin, studio hosts Phil Edwards and John Farmer and match day producer Beth Ramshaw.

Paul Hooper also presents a sports program on Friday mornings titled "The Neutral Corner". This program covers all sports, but has a particular focus on local grassroots sporting competitions. The program also features interviews with local sporting identities. Co-Hosts on this show are Anthony Stanguts, Chris Vernuccio, Nat Edwards and Nick Kostoulias. Regular contributions from Matt Lee.

== Investigations ==
3WBC has twice been investigated by the Australian Communications and Media Authority (ACMA) for breaches of the Broadcasting Services Act 1992.

In 2016, the ACMA found the station had breached the Act when incorrectly tagged sponsorship announcements were aired during a 2015 football commentary broadcast.

In 2019, the ACMA found the station had breached the Act when it failed to appropriately tag sponsorship announcements and exceeded the time limit for sponsorship announcements during a June 2019 football commentary broadcast.
