= Yarra Valley FM =

Australian radio station

Coordinates: 37°46′45″S 145°31′51″E

Yarra Valley FM (call sign: 3VYV, broadcast frequency 99.1Mhz) is the local community radio station broadcasting to the Yarra Valley area of Victoria, Australia. It can be heard throughout the Shires of Yarra Ranges, Cardinia and Murrindindi, as well as many eastern Melbourne metropolitan municipalities.

Its format includes a variety of music programs, community information, and support for emergency services.

== History ==
It started in December 1984 with two locals, Murray Hardinge and Bob Thornhill.

Its studios, from which numerous "test transmissions" were broadcast, were located in several temporary venues, including the ladies toilet of the old Healesville railway station, an office, a concrete shed and a mobile van in a cow paddock. The broadcasts were a resounding success and, with growing public profile, Yarra Valley FM commenced full-time broadcasting in March 1991 as 3VYV upon moving to the current permanent premises in Woori Yallock shopping centre.

In 2022, the station started relocation works to move from Woori Yallock back to Healesville. An existing building colocated with the Lions Club Op-Shop was renovated. The upgraded facilities include 2 Broadcast Studios, Production Studio, Upgraded Transmission Equipment Room, and Administration Office. The new facility was officially opened at 3:33pm on 3 March 2023.

Over the years the station has suffered its share of interesting setbacks, from wombats chewing cables and the threat of bushfire, to the entire transmitter on Briarty's Hill burning down in December 1995. It was the only community radio station in Australia transmitting under "remote-area power supply" which meant that volunteers had to regularly run the gauntlet of wildlife, mud, flooding (one hapless soul actually tipped their vehicle into the creek), and a borderline 4WD track to start the generator that recharged the batteries for transmitter power!

For many years, it was known as VYV – Voice of the Yarra Valley, but changed its name to Yarra Valley FM 99.1 in May 2002 to reflect the growing profile of the station. The station Strengthening Goldfields Community Radio's frequency decision was rejected in 2005 due to its potential to interfere with Yarra Valley FM's broadcast.

== Community broadcasting and business sponsorship ==
As a community (not for profit and non-commercial) radio station, Yarra Valley FM 99.1 receives two primary streams of revenue - membership subscriptions and sponsorship from local businesses. Membership is open to anyone who is interested in contributing to the aims of Yarra Valley FM 99.1. Members benefit from the rewards derived from presenting a wide variety of programs to listeners and also receive opportunities for training, participation in social activities and voting rights at members' meetings. Sponsorships come in the form of paid announcements which are limited to a total of 5 minutes per hour.
