= Plenty Valley FM =

Plenty Valley FM (3PVR)
- Melbourne; Australia
- Broadcast area: Plenty Valley RA1
- Frequency: 88.6 MHz FM

History
- First air date: December 1990

Technical information
- ERP: 656 W
- Transmitter coordinates: 37.639049°S 145.130531°E

Links
- Website: pvfm.org.au

Plenty Valley FM is a community radio station based in Melbourne, Australia, broadcasting on 88.6 MHz FM, with its studio in Mill Park. Its full-time license commenced 17 December 1990.

== See also ==
- List of radio stations in Australia
