= William Davidson (engineer) =

Australian civil engineer (1844–1920)

- Born: 6 December 1844; Moy, County Tyrone, Ireland
- Died: 2 September 1920 (aged 76); Hosie's Hotel, Melbourne Australia
- Resting place: Boroondara Cemetery
- Spouse(s): Elizabeth, née Cherry, married on 3 January 1874 at St John's Church, Ballarat.
- Children: son and three daughters
- Engineering career
- Discipline: civil engineer
- Institutions: Melbourne & Metropolitan Board of Works, Institution of Civil Engineers
- Projects: Maroondah Aqueduct
- Awards: I.S.O. in 1911

William Davidson (1844–1920), was an Australian civil engineer who headed the Melbourne Water Supply department, and was responsible for important improvements to Melbourne's water supply system during sustained periods of drought.

== Early life ==
Davidson was born on 6 December 1844 at Moy, County Tyrone, Ireland. His father, John Davidson, was an architect, and his mother was Eliza, née McCudden. Davidson was educated at the local National school, until age 13 and then worked as a clerk in Belfast.

In 1859, he worked his passage to Melbourne, Australia, then going to Ballarat, where he sought out his uncle, mining surveyor Robert Davidson. He assisted his uncle in survey work as chainman. Davidson obtained his surveyor's certificate in 1864, and then spent some years surveying farm selections, mines, and roads in northwest Victoria and Gippsland.

== Career in Australia ==
Davidson was appointed assistant to the superintending engineer of the Melbourne water supply, Charles Taylor, in April 1873.

On 16 March 1878, a major flood destroyed the bluestone viaduct carrying the Yan Yean Reservoir water across the Plenty River, severing Melbourne's drinking water supply. Davidson worked with a gang of carpenters for three days and nights to build a replacement timber flume. He was subsequently appointed superintending engineer "for the outstanding part he had played in expediting repairs and restoring water to Melbourne in three days" by the minister of public works, Sir James Patterson.

In August 1886, Davidson commenced the Watt's River Scheme (the precursor to the Maroondah Aqueduct and Maroondah Reservoir), bringing a new water source from a reservoir on the O'Shannassy River, above the junction of the Yarra River. Davidson was instrumental in conceiving and designing a system which provided Melbourne with an additional 20 million gallons (76 million liters) of high-quality drinking water each day. Additionally, the system could be expanded later to take in the entire upper Yarra River catchment. Davidson was a tireless and vigilant protector of water catchments, ensuring that any freehold was resumed, subdivision opposed, and forests protected.

In 1889, he was made inspector-general of public works, becoming chief engineer of the Melbourne water supply where he supervised the improvements and extensions to the Yan Yean Reservoir and water supply system.

He retired from public service in 1912.

== Professional achievements ==
Davidson was elected a member of the Institution of Civil Engineers (London) on 4 December 1888. From 1914–1919, he was the chairman of the Institution of Civil Engineers' Victorian branch. He was awarded the I.S.O. in 1911.

== Personal life ==
Davidson was married on 3 January 1874 at St John's Church, Ballarat, to Elizabeth Cherry. He had a son and three daughters. He became a leading member of the Yorick Club, and, in a rare distinction, was an honorary life member of the Victoria Racing Club.
