= Yan Yean Water Supply System =

Heritage-listed water supply system in Melbourne, Victoria, Australia

- Location of the water supply system most northerly point in Victoria

General information
- Status: Completed
- Type: Water supply system including: weirs; dams; reservoirs; aqueducts; pipes; tunnels
- Architectural style: Victorian
- Location: Shire of Mitchell; City of Whittlesea; City of Darebin; City of Yarra; Melbourne, Victoria, Australia
- Coordinates: 37°19′50″S 145°05′22″E
- Year built: 1853–1857; 1870s–1893
- Completed: 1857; 169 years ago
- Opened: 31 December 1857
- Owner: Victorian Public Works Department (1857–1891); Melbourne and Metropolitan Board of Works (1891–1992); Melbourne Water (since 1992– )

Technical details
- Material: Granite; bluestone; concrete; masonry

Design and construction
- Developer: Victorian Water Supply Department
- Engineer: James Blackburn

Victorian Heritage Register
- Official name: Yan Yean Water Supply System
- Type: Registered place; Registered archaeological place
- Criteria: a., b., c., d., f., h.
- Designated: 12 December 2013
- Reference no.: H2333
- Heritage overlay nos.: HO3, HO334, HO13, HO25, HO43, HO46, HO47, HO48, HO469
- Categories: Parks, Gardens and Trees; Utilities - Water

Register of the National Estate
- Official name: Toorourrong - Yan Yean Clear Water Channel & Plenty River Gates, Whittlesea; Plenty River Flume from Yan Yean Reservoir, Yan Yean Pipe Tk, Mernda
- Type: Defunct register
- Designated: undated
- Reference no.: 102614; 100515

The Yan Yean Water Supply System is a system of water supply located in Melbourne's northern suburbs, covering the local government areas of Mitchell, Whittlesea, Darebin, and Yarra, in Victoria, Australia.

The water supply system was constructed between 1853 and 1857 as the first large scale engineered water supply system in Victoria. It consists of a series of catchment weirs, dams, and reservoirs connected by aqueducts, tunnels, and pipe track which extend from the southern slopes of the Great Dividing Range to the Merri Creek, within five kilometres (three miles) of the city centre. As both the quantity and quality of water supply deteriorated over its first twenty years, further modifications and enhancements were made up until the early 1890s, when additional sources of water supply were enabled.

Built on the traditional lands of the Wurundjeri Woi-wurrung people, the water supply system was added to the Victorian Heritage Register on 12 December 2013 in recognition of its historical, architectural, technical (scientific), social, and archaeological significance; and, on an unknown date, was also identified for a future addition to the non-statutory and now defunct Register of the National Estate.

== History ==
After the establishment of Melbourne in 1835, there were increasing problems with the quality of the water supply as the population increased. Two water supply schemes were considered, and James Blackburn's proposal for a gravity-fed water supply drawn from a reservoir to be constructed near Whittlesea was selected and the Yan Yean Water Supply System was developed by the Victorian Water Supply Department in the years from 1853 and was officially opened on 31 December 1857.

The better quality of water supplied to Melbourne reduced the incidence of disease in the first two decades of its operations, but the system was plagued with problems of water quality and quantity. To overcome this, refinements were made during the latter decades of the nineteenth century. These included the 1864 construction of a holding reservoir at Preston to regulate supply pressure of water to the city and prevent stagnation in the pipes overnight, and the northern extension of the system through construction of weirs and aqueducts to harvest Wallaby Creek, Jacks Creek and Silver Creek. The 1886 construction of a second reservoir known as Toorourrong allowed sediment from these sources to settle before water passed to Yan Yean Reservoir along the new 'Clearwater Channel', avoiding a polluted section of the Plenty River.

During the 1880s, the Victorian Government purchased approximately 400 square kilometres (99,000 acres) adjacent to the creeks, rivers, and reservoirs as a measure to restrict farming and settlement activities and to enhance future water supply and quality.

By the 1890s, Melbourne's population had grown significantly. Under the direction of the newly-established Melbourne and Metropolitan Board of Works, the Maroondah System was constructed to augment supply, joining the Yan Yean pipe track at the Junction Basin. The Yan Yean Water Supply System has been continually in use since it was established. However, as a result of the addition of new systems in the twentieth century, the Yan Yean system now supplies only three per cent of the supply of potable water administered by Melbourne Water.

== Description ==
The Yan Yean Water Supply system was constructed from 1853 and comprises a range of different components and sections, including, from north to south, Silver Creek and Wallaby Creek weirs and aqueducts, The Cascades, Jacks Creek and Jacks Creek Deviation Channel, Toorourrong Reservoir, Clearwater Channel 7.6-kilometre-long (4.7 mi) aqueduct, Yan Yean Reservoir, pipe reserve from Yan Yean to Morang, Pipehead Reservoir, pipe reserve track from South Morang to Preston Reservoir, Preston Reservoir complex, and pipe reserve from Preston Reservoir to Merri Creek. The heritage-listed area includes the Yan Yean Caretakers Cottage and the masonry flume over the Plenty River.

At its most northern point, the system's catchment head rises near the town of Clonbinane and travels south through the towns, suburbs, and cities of Whittlesea, Humevale, Yan Yean, Doreen, Mernda, South Morang, Mill Park, Bundoora, Thomastown, Reservoir, Preston, Thornbury, and Northcote to Fitzroy North.

== See also ==
- List of places on the Victorian Heritage Register in the City of Darebin
- List of places on the Victorian Heritage Register in the City of Whittlesea
- List of places on the Victorian Heritage Register in the City of Yarra
- List of places on the Victorian Heritage Register in the Shire of Mitchell
- List of reservoirs and dams in Victoria
- Maroondah Water Supply System
- Melbourne Water
