= Donnelly Weir =

Coordinates: 37°37′41.6″S 145°32′7.4″E

Donnelly Weir (formerly Donnelly's Weir) is located in the Yarra Ranges. It diverts water from Donnelly Creek, a tributary of the Watts River just downstream of the Maroondah Dam, into the Maroondah Aqueduct. It is a part of the system that supplies water to the city of Melbourne, Australia. It is managed by Melbourne Water. It is often visited by students studying Melbourne's water supply because of its easy access and information signs. It was heavily impacted by the Black Saturday bushfires and was closed for many months afterwards. The immediate areas were burnt out and all of the facilities had to be replaced.

== Gallery ==
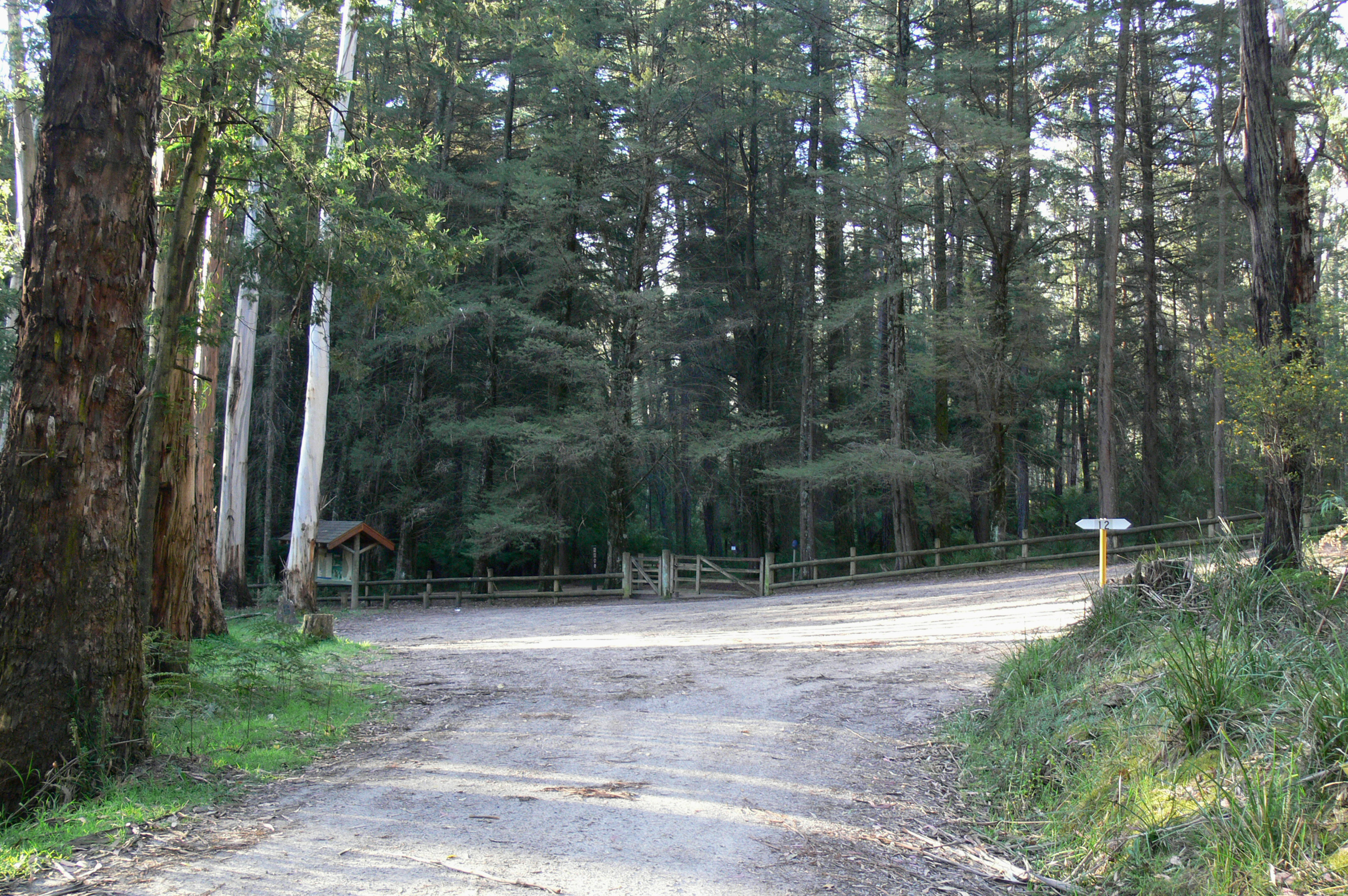
Donnelly Weir car park

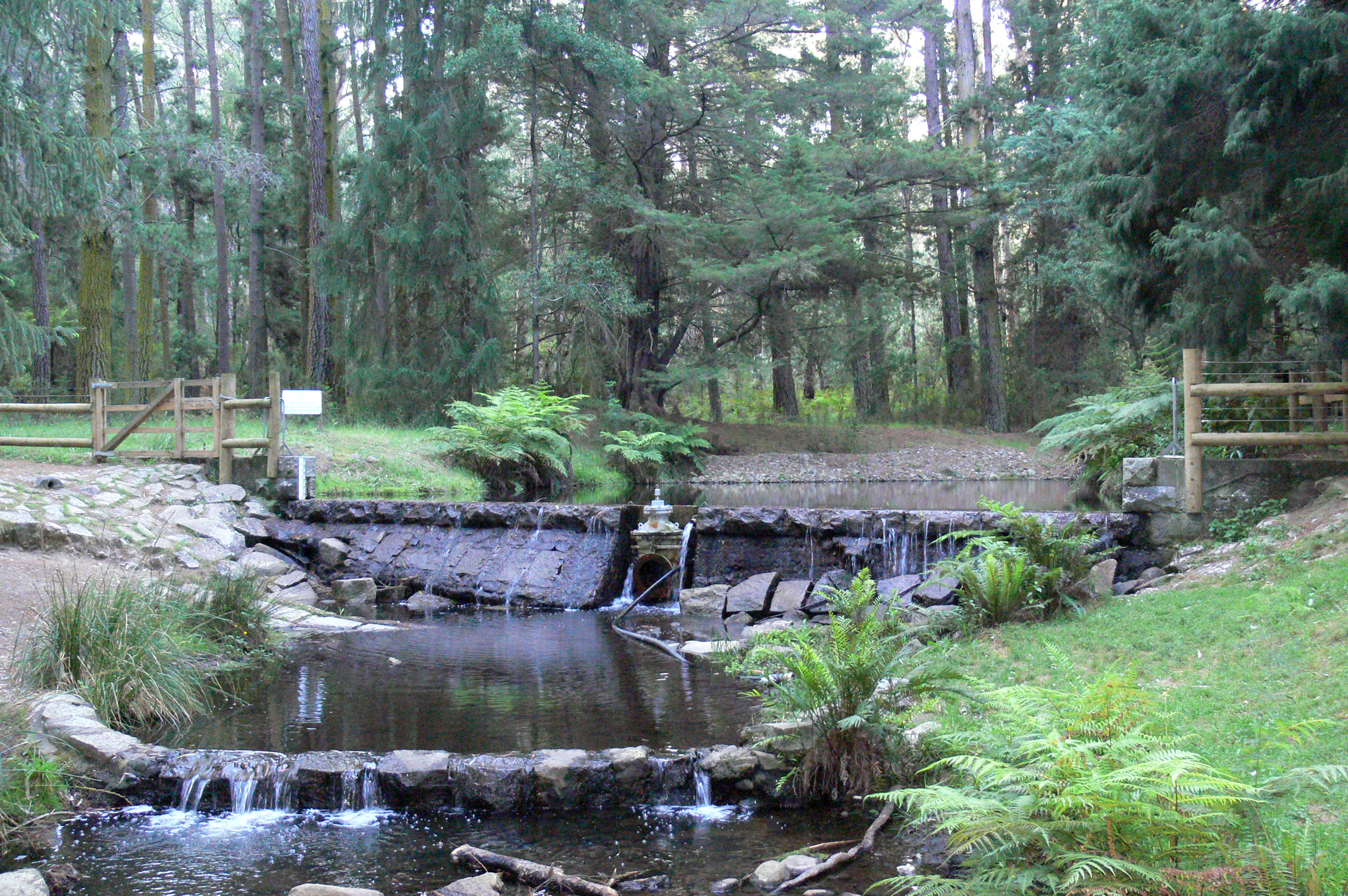
Donnelly Weir

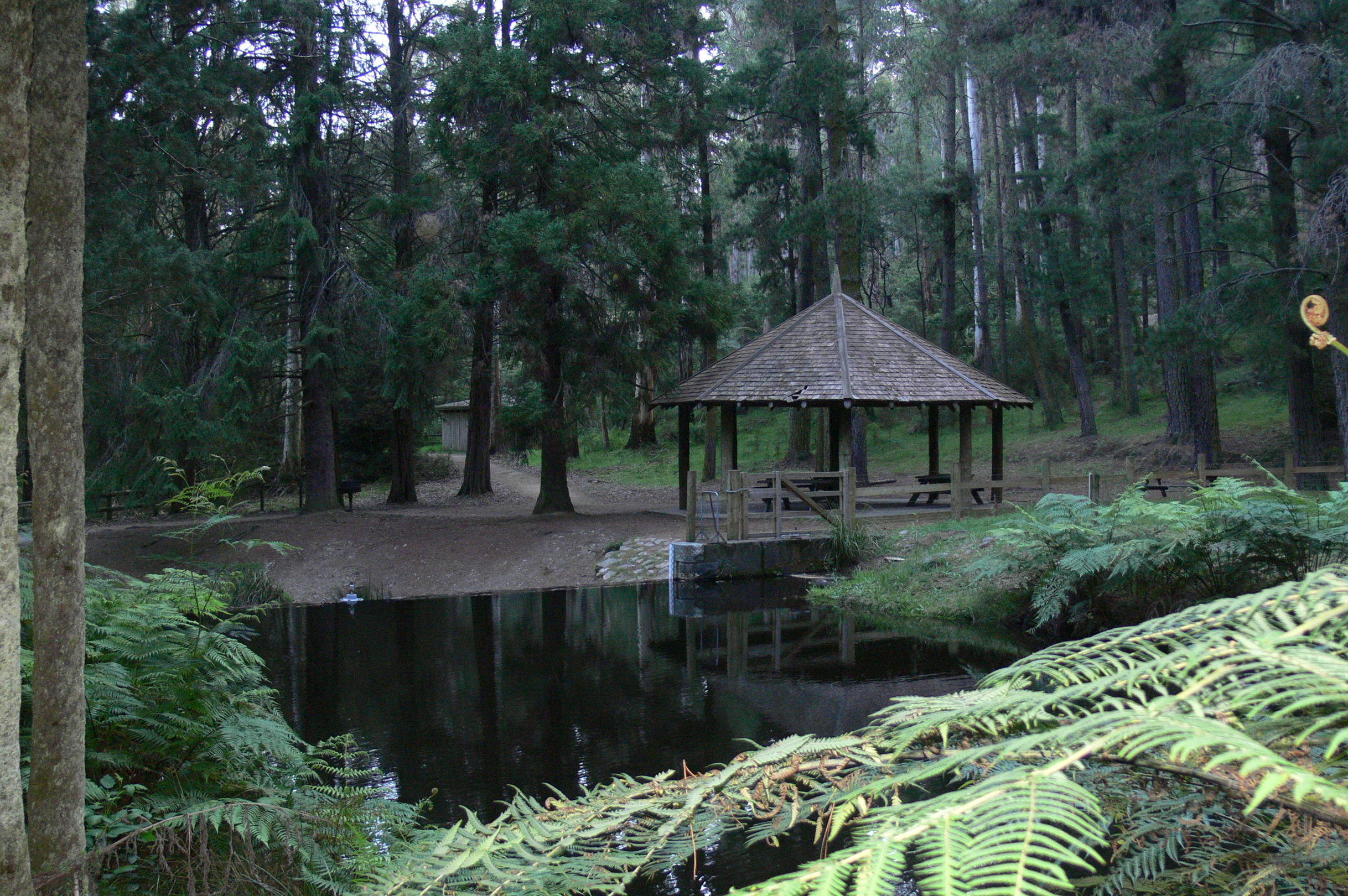
Donnelly Weir picnic area

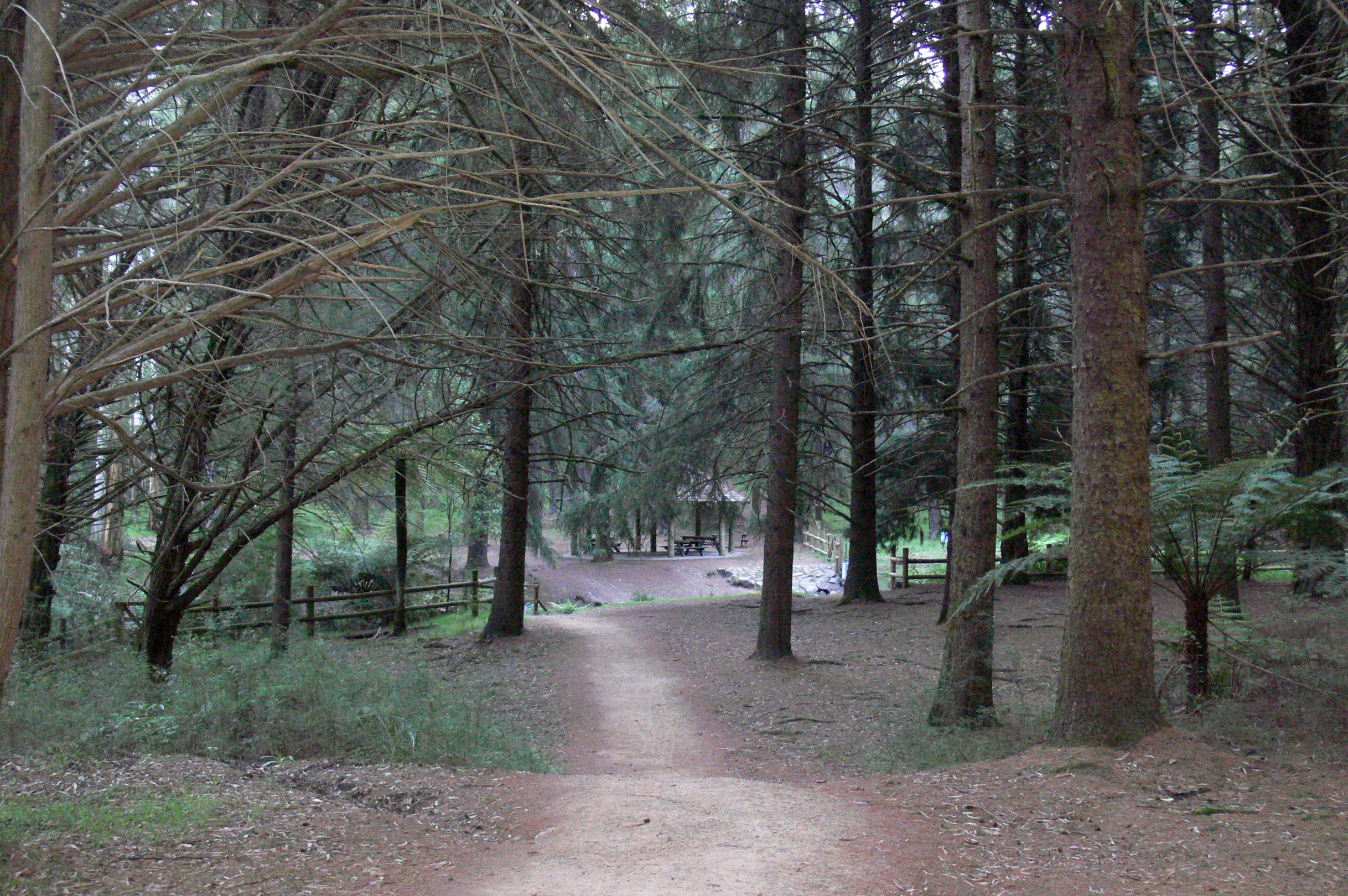
Donnelly Weir walking track

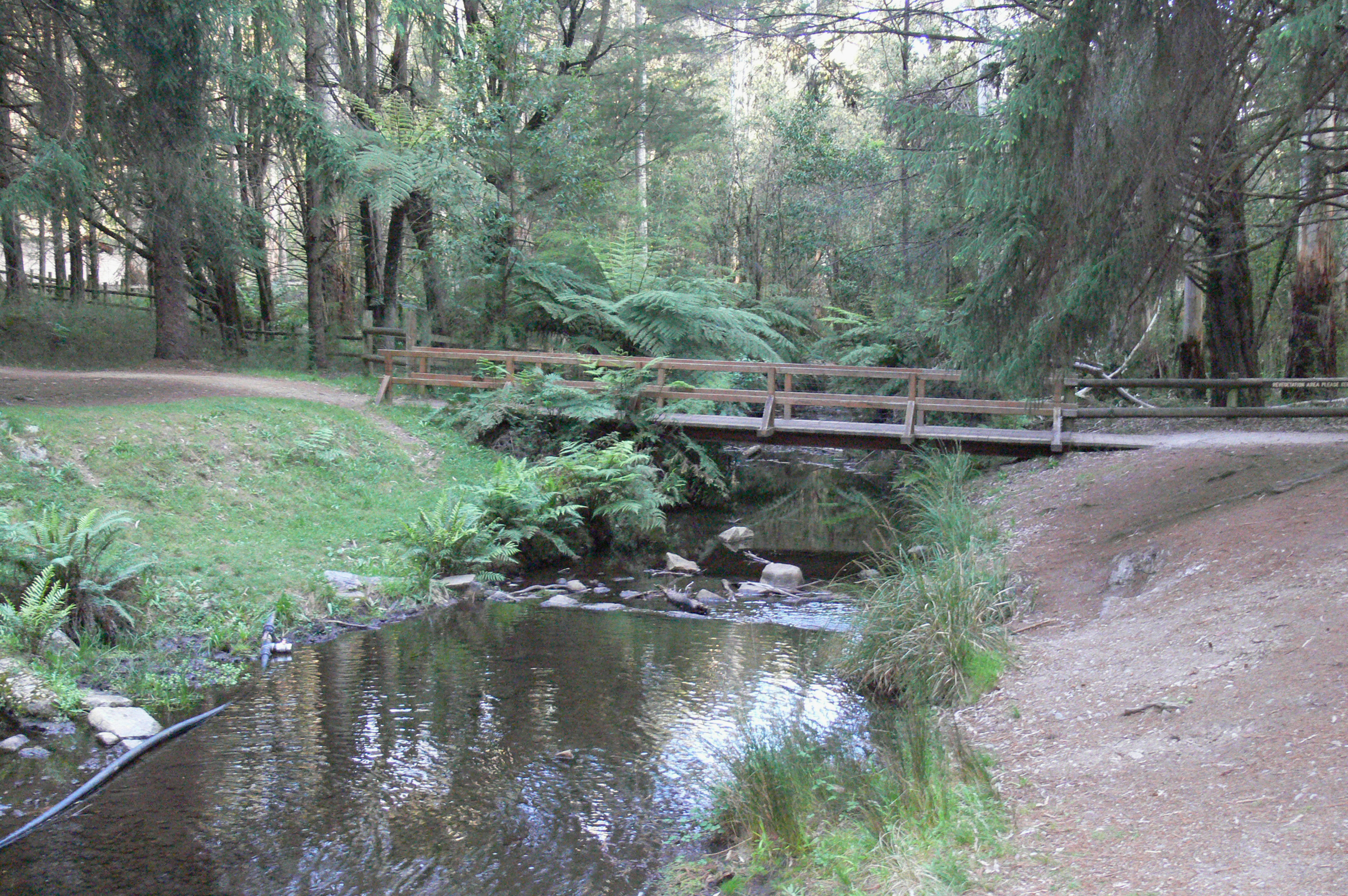
Donnelly Weir foot bridge
