= Upper Yarra Reservoir =

Reservoir and dam in Victoria, Australia

Upper Yarra Dam
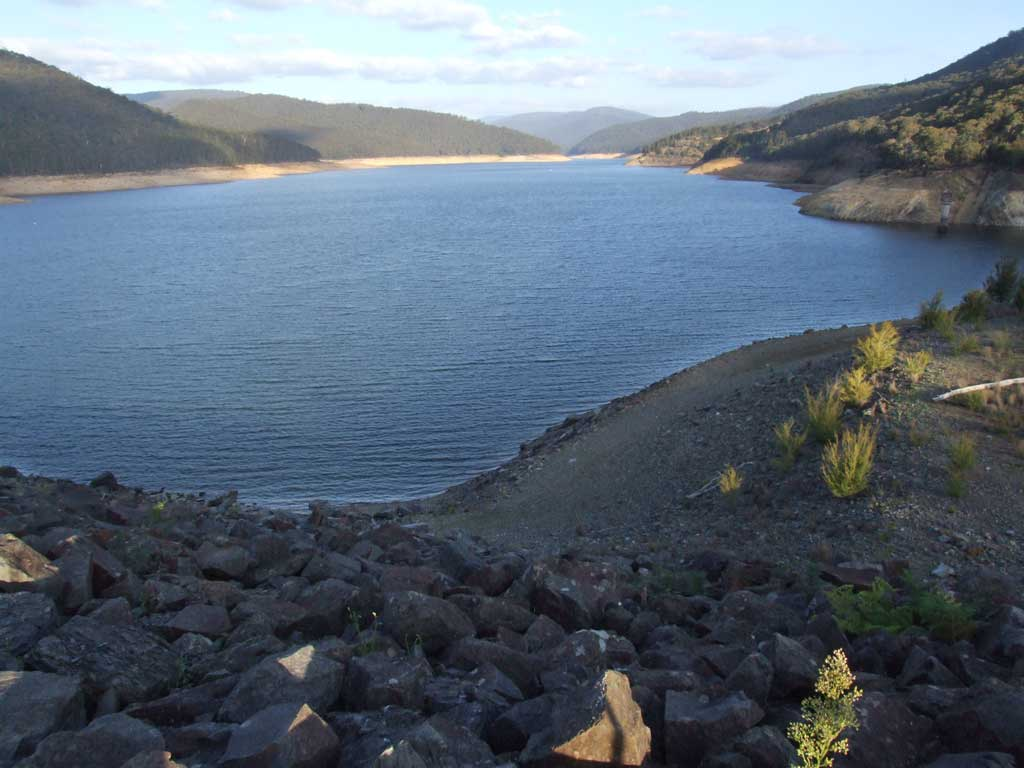
- The reservoir, during the 2007 drought

- Location of the dam and reservoir in Victoria
- Interactive map of Upper Yarra Dam
- Country: Australia
- Location: Greater Melbourne, Victoria
- Coordinates: 37.674072°S 145.898459°E
- Purpose: Water supply
- Status: Operational
- Construction began: 1948
- Opening date: 1957
- Built by: Melbourne and Metropolitan Board of Works
- Operator: Melbourne Water

Dam and spillways
- Type of dam: Earth fill dam
- Impounds: Yarra River
- Height (foundation): 89
- Length: 610
- Dam volume: 5660
- Spillways: 1
- Spillway type: Uncontrolled
- Spillway capacity: 3,392 m^{3}/s (119,800 cu ft/s)

Reservoir
- Creates: Upper Yarra Reservoir
- Total capacity: 204,895 ML (166,111 acre⋅ft)
- Catchment area: 337 km^{2} (130 sq mi)
- Surface area: 750 ha (1,900 acres)
- Maximum water depth: 77 m (253 ft)
- Normal elevation: 360 m (1,180 ft) AHD
- Website melbournewater.com.au

The Upper Yarra Reservoir is a reservoir formed by the Upper Yarra Dam, an earth-filled embankment dam across the Yarra River, located at Reefton, near Warburton, east of Melbourne, Victoria, Australia. Completed in 1957 for the supply of potable water for Greater Metropolitan Melbourne, water from the reservoir also supplies towns in the upper Yarra Valley, and feeds into Silvan Reservoir.

The reservoir and dam are operated by Melbourne Water.

== Dam and reservoir overview ==
=== Dam ===
The earth-filled dam wall is 89 metres (292 ft) high and 610 metres (2,000 ft) long. When full, the resultant reservoir has a storage capacity of 204,895 megalitres (166,111 acre⋅ft) and covers 750 hectares (1,900 acres), drawn from a catchment area of 337 square kilometres (130 sq mi). The uncontrolled spillway has a discharge capacity of 3,392 cubic metres per second (119,800 cu ft/s). The dam was completed in 1957, initially for the purpose of preventing flooding downstream.

=== Reservoir ===
The management of 157,000 hectares (390,000 acres) of Melbourne's forested water catchments of the Upper Yarra, such as the Watts (Maroondah), were vested in the Melbourne and Metropolitan Board of Works (MMBW) in 1891. In 1928, the Upper Yarra catchment was permanently added for water supply purposes. Approval to construct the dam was granted in the early 1940s, however, due to World War II, work did not start until 1948. John L. Savage, an American engineer, consulted on the construction of the dam, under the direction and supervision of Albert Francis Ronalds, the chief engineer of the Board of Works.

When the Upper Yarra Reservoir was completed the total storage capacity of Melbourne's system was tripled to nearly 300,000 megalitres (240,000 acre⋅ft). The Upper Yarra Reservoir is also supplied by water transferred from the Thomson River Dam.

During the 2000s, severe drought in south-eastern Australia resulted in low water levels in the reservoir, which on 5 January 2007 was approximately half full. As of 22 July 2013, the reservoir was approximately 47 per cent of capacity. By late September 2021, the reservoir was approximately 93 per cent of capacity.

Located adjacent to the reservoir is the Upper Yarra Reservoir Park, managed by Parks Victoria, where camping and hiking are permitted.

== See also ==
- List of reservoirs and dams in Victoria
