= Yarra Valley Water =

Water and wastewater utility in Victoria, Australia

Agency overview
- Formed: 1 January 1995
- Preceding agencies: Melbourne and Metropolitan Board of Works; Melbourne Water
- Jurisdiction: Government of Victoria
- Headquarters: 25-35 Lucknow Street, Mitcham, Melbourne, Victoria, Australia
- Employees: 800+
- Minister responsible: Harriet Shing, Minister for Water (Victoria)
- Agency executives: Pat McCafferty, Managing Director; Gabrielle Bell, Chair of the Board; Rob Skinner AM, Deputy Chair; Victor Perton, Director; Mary Kanavoutsos, Director; Robyn McLeod AM, Director; Karen Milward, Director; Victoria Marles AM, Director; Kate Vinot, Director
- Parent department: Department of Health (Victoria)
- Website: https://www.yvw.com.au/

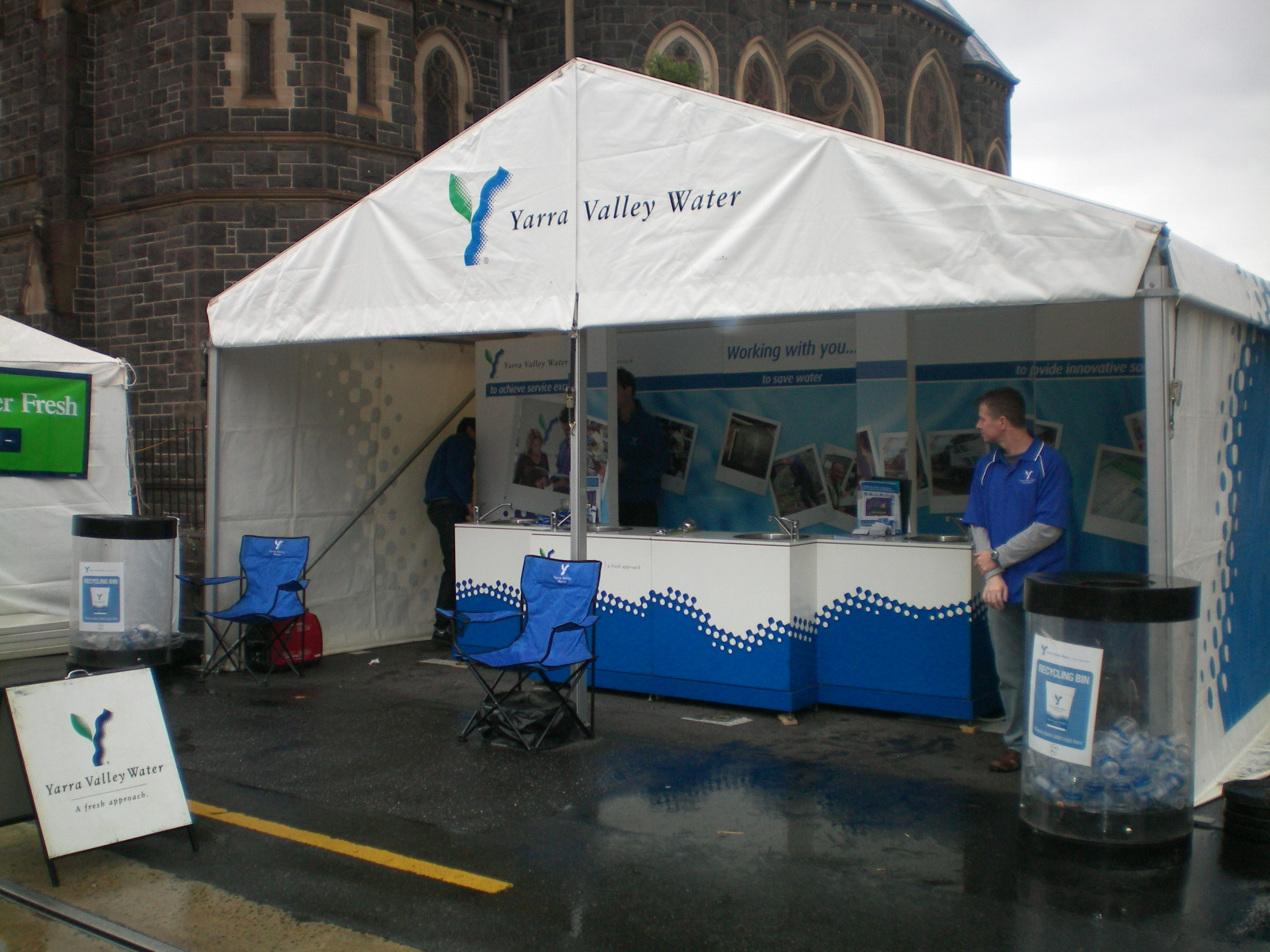
A Yarra Valley Water stall at a community festival in Melbourne.

Yarra Valley Water is a Victorian Government-owned retail water corporation and the largest of the three water corporations that service metropolitan Melbourne. It provides drinking water, sewerage, trade waste, recycled water, and water-saving services to over two million people and over 61,000 businesses in the northern and eastern suburbs of Melbourne, or around 30% of Victoria's population. The water distributed by Yarra Valley Water is supplied by Melbourne Water, as is the infrastructure. Oversight is provided by the Department of Energy, Environment and Climate Action.

Yarra Valley Water's district covers approximately 4,000 square kilometres from as far north as Wallan and extending to Warburton in the east. Yarra Valley Water owns and maintains over 10,400km of water mains and over 10,300km of sewer mains.

As a government-owned corporation, Yarra Valley Water is a public entity that operates on a commercial model. Its activities are overseen by an independent Board of Directors appointed by the Victorian Government. Day-to-day management and administration are delegated to the Managing Director and Executive Team. Yarra Valley Water's head office is situated in Mitcham and employs around 800 staff.

Yarra Valley Water has committed to achieving net-zero emissions as part of its "beyond zero carbon" initiative. From 1 July 2025, the corporation achieved the milestone of being powered by 100% renewable electricity and is on track to report net-zero Scope 1 and Scope 2 emissions for the 2025-26 financial year, four years ahead of its government obligations. The organisation is also working to reduce Scope 3 emissions, with a target of a 67% reduction by 2030 from a 2023-24 baseline. Efforts include installation of solar PV production facilities at various Yarra Valley Water-owned sites, and the use of its food waste to energy facilities.

== Infrastructure ==
Yarra Valley Water manages:

- 10,475 kilometres of water supply mains
- 836 kilometres of recycled water supply mains
- 10,396 kilometres of sewer mains
- 90 drinking water and recycled water pumping stations
- 149 drinking water and recycled water pressure reducing stations
- 94 sewerage pumping stations
- 50 drinking water and recycled water service reservoirs
- 9 sewage treatment plants
- 1 food waste to energy facility (ReWaste)
- 3 recycled water treatment plants

In 2023-24, 81km of water and sewerage supply mains were renewed or replaced.

== Waste to Energy ==
Yarra Valley Water established the ReWaste waste to energy facility in Wollert, which receives commercial food waste that is broken down using anaerobic digestion in digestate tanks, to produce biogas. This biogas is used to fuel an engine which generates electricity, powering the ReWaste infrastructure and adjacent sewage treatment plant. Excess generated electricity is exported to the power grid. The process also produces digestate, a nutrient-rich product useful in agriculture. Waste is not incinerated or burned. In 2023-24, 13,950 tonnes of food waste was processed to generate renewable electricity.

A second ReWaste waste to energy facility, located in Lilydale, is currently under construction. The new $48 million facility is expected to start taking commercial food waste in 2025 and be fully operational in 2026. This facility is designed to divert approximately 55,000 tonnes of food waste from landfill annually and is expected to generate up to 39,000 kWh of electricity per day, enough to power more than 2,200 households. The project is expected to reduce emissions by 24,700 tonnes every year.
