= Melbourne and Metropolitan Board of Works =

Former public utility in Melbourne, Victoria, Australia

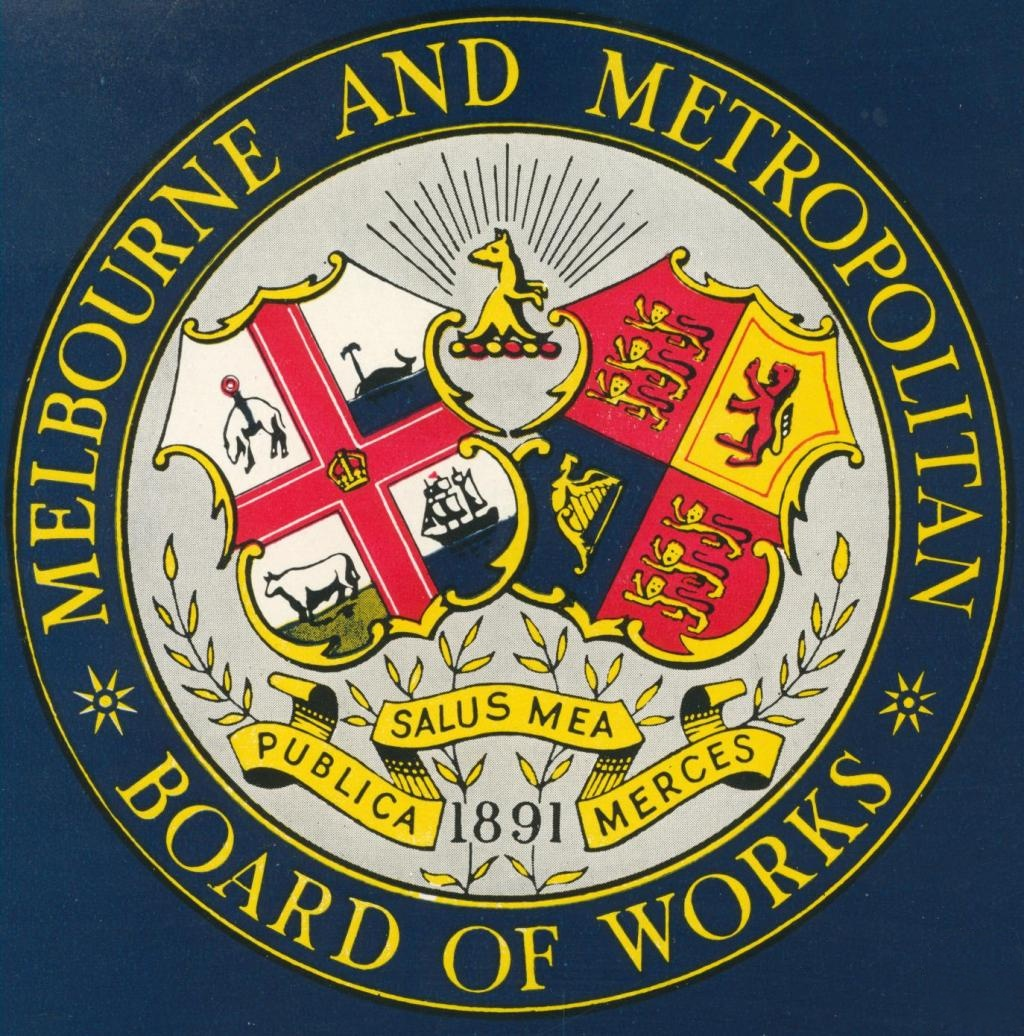
- Seal of the MMBW

Government agency overview
- Formed: 1891
- Preceding Government agency: Victorian Public Works Department
- Dissolved: 1974 (roads); 1987 (urban planning); 1992 (water)
- Superseding agencies: Road Construction Authority (roads); Ministry for Planning and Environment (urban planning); Melbourne Water (water)
- Type: Board of works
- Jurisdiction: Greater Metropolitan Melbourne, Victoria, Australia: Water supply, sewerage and sewage treatment (1891–1992); Highways and bridges (1956–1974); Urban planning (de facto) (1949–1987)
- Status: Defunct
- Headquarters: Melbourne
- Key documents: Melbourne and Metropolitan Board of Works Act 1891; Metropolitan Drainage and Rivers Act 1923; Town and Country Planning (Metropolitan Area) Act 1949; Town and Country Planning Act 1958

The Melbourne and Metropolitan Board of Works, abbreviated as MMBW, was a public utility board in Melbourne, Victoria, Australia, set up in 1891 to provide water supply, sewerage and sewage treatment functions for the city; and was charged with responsibility for metropolitan highways and bridges from 1956 to 1974; and assumed responsibility for urban planning from 1949 to 1987. Following devolvement of its former planning and road transport functions, in 1992 the MMBW was merged with a number of smaller urban water authorities to form Melbourne Water.

== Establishment ==
From Melbourne's settlement in the 1830s into the boom years of the 1880s, the disposal of sewage was very basic. In the early days the majority of waste from homes and industries flowed into street channels and on to local rivers and creeks which became open sewers. By the 1880s, many homes in the inner city had privies backing into a rear lane, the pail closet system where "night soil" was collected in pans by a "nightman" reaching through a small door in the back of the outdoor toilet. It was carted away to the outer fringes of Melbourne, where it was often used as fertiliser by market gardeners. Because the waste stayed in the pan for up to a week, and some waste still flowed straight into the street, Melbourne was nicknamed "Smellbourne".

By the late 1880s Melbourne's population had grown immensely to nearly 500,000 people, and the city's waste disposal habits made the rivers, creeks and bays unhygienic and unsightly, and epidemics of typhoid became frequent (one in four children did not survive past their second year). This led to a royal commission into Melbourne's public health in 1888, which recommended a sewerage system, and supported the establishment of a Board of Works to build it. James Mansergh, an eminent British sanitary engineer, was brought out by the Victorian Government in 1889 to recommend the most appropriate plan; he advocated a water-borne sewerage system, something local engineers had long asked for.

The MMBW was established by the Melbourne and Metropolitan Board of Works Act 1890 passed by the Victorian Parliament in December 1890. The board was based on London's Metropolitan Board of Works, which was established as an appointed rather than elected authority to take charge of citywide initiatives, such as sewerage and parks. The act made the board responsible for the construction and operation of a sewerage system, as well as the existing water supply from the Yan Yean Reservoir.

The MMBW took on the government debt incurred in the building of the Yan Yean water supply, an amount then in excess of £2 million, but was also empowered to impose rates for water supply and sewerage on properties in the "Metropolis" (being "The City of Melbourne and the Suburbs thereof").

== Sewerage system ==
Construction began on Melbourne's sewerage system under the leadership of the MMBW's first engineer-in-chief, William Thwaites in 1892. Thwaites had convinced the board to abandon Mansergh's scheme and to adopt an alternative, simpler scheme that in all essential aspects was identical to a scheme he had proposed in 1889.

Huge brick-lined sewers were built under the city, draining towards the west running under the Yarra to a pumping station at Spotswood (which still exists as part of the Scienceworks Museum). It was then piped on to a treatment farm, now the Western Treatment Plant, near Werribee, a small country town at the time, where the treated water was used to irrigate pasture and market gardens. The system began operations in 1897.

By 1910, there were 123,227 connections to Melbourne's water supply system and 105,993 connections to the sewerage system.

As part of this work, the MMBW measured up and drew detailed maps of all the settled areas of Melbourne at a scale of 40 feet to 1 inch (1:480), creating a set of maps that are now an important historic resource.

== Later activities ==
There was no initial planning for a separate citywide storm water management system. By the 1920s a need for improved metropolitan drainage, in particular infrastructure involving more than one municipal district, was identified. Under the Metropolitan Drainage and Rivers Act 1923 the MMBW became responsible for metropolitan main drains, for which it was empowered to imposed a drainage rate. Local councils remained responsible for local drainage.

In the years towards the end of World War II, there was a general concern to prepare citywide plans for post war reconstruction and development, and a Town and Country Planning Board was established in 1944. The Town and Country Planning (Metropolitan Area) Act 1949 gave the MMBW authority to prepare a comprehensive plan for the metropolitan area of Melbourne, and in 1954 the board was made the ongoing chief planning authority for metropolitan Melbourne. The board had made a thorough study of land use and infrastructure in Melbourne and produced the Melbourne Metropolitan Planning Scheme 1954 which recommended amongst other things land-use zoning, a system of freeways and bypasses, and a park system.

Under the Town and Country Planning Act 1958, the board was empowered to impose a "Metropolitan improvement rate" for its responsibilities. The MMBW remained the de facto, unelected planning authority for Melbourne until the Ministry for Planning and Environment was created in 1987.

The responsibility for the construction and maintenance of metropolitan highways and bridges was vested in the board by an amending Act in 1956, causing a great deal of conflict with the Country Roads Board (CRB), until all road responsibilities passed to the CRB on 1 July 1974. At that time also, the MMBW's responsibility for protection of Melbourne's Port Phillip foreshores (extending from Mount Eliza to Werribee) was transferred to the Ports and Harbours Division of the Public Works Department.

== Abolition ==
In 1992 the MMBW was abolished and replaced by Melbourne Water. During the 1990s Melbourne Water lost the majority of the former MMBW's remaining functions, water supply, sewerage, and some parks. Water supply and sewerage services were split into three public water retailers, while its waterway functions were transferred firstly to Melbourne Parks and Waterways and then to the Minister for Conservation, with Parks Victoria becoming a service provider to the State for the conservation and management of waterways (for which the parks charge, being the former "Metropolitan Improvement Rate" is imposed on Melbourne household water bills) as well as some metropolitan parks. The waterways that had previously been vested in the MMBW reverted to crown land (s.175 of the Water Industry Act). By the end of the 1990s Melbourne Water's main responsibility was for the provision of bulk water from Melbourne's numerous reservoirs (including water provision to irrigators in outer Melbourne), main drains (for which it continued to impose a metropolitan drainage tariff, having lost the power to impose a rate), and sewage treatment. As a successor in law to the Dandenong Valley Authority it is also responsible for flood protection in that former authority's declared "Waterway Management District" (e.g. Patterson Lakes). It imposed a "waterway management charge" (otherwise known as a Special Drainage or Precept charge) for the building of levee banks and other flood protection works in these flood prone areas.

== List of chairmen and chief engineers ==
The following individuals served as chairmen, chief engineers, or equivalent titles at the Melbourne Metropolitan Board of Works between 1891 and 1992:

=== Chairmen ===
Ordinal	Officeholder	Title	Term start	Term end	Time in office	Notes
1	Edmond Gerald FitzGibbon	Chairman	1891	1905	13–14 years	
2	Walter Carre Riddell	Chairman	1905	1927	21–22 years	
3		Chairman	1927	1940	12–13 years	
4	John Cecil Jessop	Chairman	1940	1956	15–16 years	
5	Raymond E. Trickey	Chairman	1956	1966	9–10 years	
6	Alan Humphrey Croxford	Chairman	1966	31 July 1982	15–16 years	
7	Raymond David Marginson AM	Chairman	1982	1992	9–10 years	

==== Edmond Gerald FitzGibbon ====
Edmond Gerald FitzGibbon (1 November 1825 – 12 December 1905) was Melbourne Town Clerk from 1856 to 1891 and first chairman of the MMBW, appointed in 1891. He had previously campaigned for a London-style Board of Works to provide Melbourne with essential public utilities including water supply and sewerage. He campaigned against pollution of the Yarra by effluent from factories. As early as the mid-1860s he was negotiating with governments and suburban councils to get agreement. The resistance of the suburban councils finally gave way when FitzGibbon helped obtain favourable terms. He was, however, criticised by the press for the high capital expenditure, having raised large loans from London Banks, when it was believed the works could be financed more cheaply in Melbourne. During FitzGibbon's fourteen years as chairman of the MMBW, the sewerage system was completed and water catchments were consolidated and protected. FitzGibbon, having succumbed to illness, died in office.

A bronze statue was erected in 1908 at the corner of St Kilda Road and Linlithgow Avenue, in the Melbourne city centre, to commemorate his achievement. The statue was sculpted by James White with a Harcourt granite pedestal, and known as the 'Edmund Fitzgibbon Memorial'.

==== Walter Riddell ====
Walter Carre Riddell (1859–1930) was chairman of the MMBW from 1905 to 1927. Riddell was one of the pioneer settlers of Riddells Creek in Victoria, and became a councillor for the Shire of Caulfield in 1889. Riddell had a long-standing interest in sanitation having undertaken extensive travels in Europe in 1888 where he had inspected sewage farms in Germany and Britain. He was a commissioner on the first Board of Works representing the council in 1891. Riddell was appointed as chairman in 1905, initially for fifteen months in an honorary capacity, as the Act prohibited him from taking a salary until he had given up his legal practice. He was elected full-time chairman in April 1907 with a unanimous vote. During his twenty years' tenure, Melbourne's sewerage system did not present major problems, with the 'metropolitan farm' working adequately and \extended as necessary. A new system of grass filtration was introduced to supplement land filtration when the weather was too wet for evaporation and soil absorption to work effectively. Riddell took a special interest in the cattle breeding programs at Werribee; and was also responsible for recognising the uneven growth of Melbourne was putting a strain on the sewers, and so began the planning for separate south-eastern treatment plant and sewer network.

==== John Jessop ====
John Cecil Jessop (1892–1968), was chairman of the board from 1940 to 1956, taking over the role at a difficult time, when the board was under pressure to meet demand for services in a period of rapidly growing post-war development. He presided over the preparation of the 1954 Melbourne Metropolitan Planning Scheme, which saw many American innovations such as the freeway and open space networks.

==== Raymond Trickey ====
Raymond E. Trickey was chosen to succeed as to chairman of the Board of Works in 1955, taking up the position in 1956. He had spent the preceding twelve years on the board, primarily on the finance committee, and previously had been on the Brighton Council for 24 years and mayor three times. His appointment was challenged by Prahran Council who wished to extend the term of retiring chairman, Jessop, and open the position to other than existing commissioners. Trickey's tenure was seen as ineffective, especially in contrast to his successor, Croxford.

==== Alan Croxford ====
Alan Humphrey Croxford (1922–1985) was chairman of the MMBW from 1966 to his retirement on 31 July 1982, when he left his position as the new Cain Labor Government came to power. Labor had been critical in opposition, of his role and influence at the board, and in particular his private land dealings for which an enquiry was held. During this time he was known as The 'Baron of the Board' and while steering the organisation through a period of major expansion, and increased power, he gained a reputation as the most powerful bureaucrat in the state. Among his achievements were the 1971–1974 Masterplan that set the future growth of Melbourne separated by green wedges, and the creation of the metropolitan park system.

==== Raymond Marginson ====
Raymond David Marginson AM (1923–2019) was chairman of the Board of Works from 1982 to 1992, when the board was de-constituted and in its place Melbourne Water and ultimately four separate retail companies were established. Marginson joined the Commonwealth Public Service on 20 July 1948 as a research clerk in the Department of Transport, moving to the Postmaster General's Department in 1950, where he held numerous posts. In 1966 he resigned from the Commonwealth Public Service, when he was appointed vice principal of the University of Melbourne. Held that position until 1988, although during this time he also obtained an Eisenhower Exchange Fellowship to the United States in 1968 and was part-time chairman of MMBW and then, Melbourne Water. He was appointed as a Member of the Order of Australia in 1985 for services to university administration. Marginson was president of the Council of Museum Victoria in the late 1980s and, along with his wife Betty, he played an important philanthropic role for many Victorian cultural institutions.

=== Chief engineers and other titles ===
Officeholder	Title	Term start	Term end	Time in office	Notes
William Thwaites	Engineer-in-chief	1891	1907	15–16 years	
Calder Edkins Oliver		1907	1919	11–12 years	
William Wilson	Engineer of Sewerage Construction	1908	1925	16–17 years	
Edgar Gowar Ritchie	Engineer of Water Supply	1908	1936	27–28 years	
A. M. Grant	Engineer of Sewerage Construction	1925	1929	3–4 years	
Edwin Fullarton Borrie	Engineer of Sewerage Construction	1929	1950	20–21 years	
Edwin Fullarton Borrie	Chief Planner	1950	1959	8–9 years	
Alexander Edward Kelso	Engineer of Water Supply	1936	1943	6–7 years	
F. M. Lee	Engineer of Water Supply	1943	1955	11–12 years	
F. M. Lee	Deputy engineer-in-chief	1955	1966	10–11 years	
James Alexander McIntosh	Engineer of Sewerage Construction	1950	1955	4–5 years	
James Alexander McIntosh	Chief investigating and designing engineer	1955	1967	11–12 years	
Albert (Bert) Francis Ronalds	Engineer-in-Chief	1955	1967	11–12 years	
Edgar Sherwen	Chief construction engineer	1955	1960	4–5 years	
A. G. Robertson	Engineer-in-Chief	1967	1976	8–9 years	
L. J. Brack	Engineer-in-Chief	1976	1981	4–5 years	
N. B. Smith	Director of engineering	1982	1985	2–3 years	
N. B. Smith	Deputy general manager	1985	1986	0–1 years	

==== William Thwaites ====
William Thwaites (1853–1907) is considered the father of Melbourne's sewage system, despite official design credits going to Mansergh. Thwaites commenced his engineering career on railway construction in the 1870s and then moved to the Victorian Public Works Department in 1879 surveying the Portland Harbour, Gippsland Lakes entrance and Sale navigation canal, as part of preparatory plans for their development under Sir John Coode's designs. He also undertook a survey of Swan Island for defence purposes in 1879. In 1880 he transferred to the Water Supply Department, surveying the Broken Creek improvement, and then under the renamed Melbourne Water Supply Branch of the PWD worked under mentorship of William Davidson. From 1881 he was surveying Bruce's Creek diversion and prepared drawings for the Yan Yean clearwater channel, Toorourrong Reservoir when he discovered Wallaby and Silver creeks and demonstrated their suitability for diversion of water to Yan Yean at a time of serious water storage. he then surveyed the Wallaby and Silver creek aqueducts. Thwaites also designed schemes of service reservoirs to serve the expanding suburbs, including those at Essendon Caulfield and Preston. However, a major failure in this period was the cracking of the new water main over Merri Creek on the Yan Yean supply, which was shown by W. C. Kernot to have been caused by errors in Thwaites' and Davidson's design.

In 1883 Thwaites was appointed engineer, roads, bridges and drainage in the PWD, and undertook a series of swamp reclamation schemes including the Port Melbourne Lagoon (1885), West Melbourne Swamp, Moonee Ponds Creek, Koo-Wee-Rup Swamp (1890), the Moe River and Lake Condah although the last was completed by Carlo Catani. In 1889 Thwaites also designed the system for pumping water from Dight's Falls on the Yarra River, to the Botanic Gardens. Thwaites was made engineer in charge of the water supply branch in 1890, and engineer-in-chief of the Melbourne and Metropolitan Board of Works in 1891.

==== William Davidson ====
William Davidson (1844–1920), was a civil engineer appointed as assistant to the superintending engineer of the Melbourne water supply in 1873, and chief engineer in 1889. He made an important contribution to the development of Melbourne's Sewerage system by providing meticulous statistics of water usage from the Water Supply Department, which could help calculate the capacity needed for the sewers.

==== Christian Kussmaul ====
Christian Kussmaul (1851–1916) was in charge of design the key component in the system, the Spotswood sewage pumping station. It was said of him that "… it is well known that the success of its work is due more to the designing engineer, Mr. C. Kussmaul, than any other individual." Kussmaul was born on 9 January 1851 and gained experience undertaking railway work in Germany. He moved to Australia in 1886 initially joining the Victorian Railways, then moving to the Melbourne and Metropolitan Board of Works in 1891, where he was promoted to the position of Designing Engineer and then acting deputy to the Engineer-in-Chief. He was given six months leave of absence and his position abolished from the board in 1914 (in lieu of dismissal), while another nine other German born employees were dismissed, as anti-German sentiment and fear of sabotage spread throughout Australia. Kussmaul died shortly after leaving the board, on 30 July 1916. He was elected an associate member of the Institute of Civil Engineers on 6 December 1898 and became a full member on 24 February 1903.

==== Edgar Ritchie ====
Edgar Gowar Ritchie (15 July 1871 – 23 July 1956) was a hydraulic engineer who worked for the Melbourne and Metropolitan Board of Works for the majority of his career. Ritchie was actively involved in the MMBW from its formation and was involved in development of Melbourne's water supply from 1896, and went on to become Engineer of Water Supply with the MMBW in the 1920s. Ritchie was also engineer in charge of sewerage from 1891 and one particularly tragic incident he had to deal with involved investigations into the death of three men during sewer works when they were overcome by gas. He identified the need to keep certain chemicals out of the sewer system. From 1908 he was engineer in charge of water supply and was responsible for construction of the Maroondah, O'Shannassy and Silvan reservoirs and their associated aqueducts. He retired in 1936 In 1943, Ritchie was awarded the Peter Nicol Russell Memorial Medal from the Institution of Engineers Australia.

==== Calder Oliver ====
Calder Edkins Oliver (1855–1930), came from an engineering family, his father, Alexander Calder Oliver, having been secretary of the Victorian Roads and Bridges department. He also married a sister of Professor Kernot. Educated at Melbourne University, he passed as civil engineer in 1877, master of civil engineering in 1893, obtained the certificate of hydraulic engineer in 1889 and municipal engineer in 1896. In 1877–1878 he was field assistant in the Victorian Railways department, then from 1878 to 1883 with railway contractors C. and E. Millar, followed by sewerage and water supply work with the Sydney Corporation. He commenced with the MMBW on its formation in 1891 holding positions of superintending engineer of sewerage, superintending engineer of sewerage and water supply, acting chief engineer, and engineer in chief ( in 1908). Oliver was a member of the University Club, honorary co-examiners in hydraulic engineering at Melbourne University, an associate member of the Institute of Civil Engineers 1888, and full member from 1897. He assisted with the development of sewerage systems in Perth in 1909, Brisbane in 1912, and Canberra in 1916. Oliver retired from the board in April 1919, after 27 1/2 years, joining the consulting engineers A. G. Harding Frew & Co. He died in 1930 aged 74 years.

==== Edwin Borrie ====
Edwin Fullarton Borrie (1894–1968), was a civil engineer and town planner who was the first engineer of main drains for the MMBW in 1924. He took on the role as chief engineer of sewerage from 1929 to 1950, and supervised the expansion of the system and supervised the design of the Braeside sewage treatment plant that served Melbourne's the south-eastern suburbs. He prepared a report on the sewerage system of Auckland, New Zealand and toured North America, Britain and Europe in 1937 to learn from overseas sewerage practice. Two influential reports came out of his considerations of future population growth in Melbourne and the consequent expansion of the urban area. He was instrumental in undertaking preliminary investigations for the Melbourne 1954 Strategy Plan, co-ordinated a team comprising an architect, economist, surveyor and sociologist, surveying, mapping and predicting future needs for the city, and then spent many evenings at public talks promoting the plan, which was published in 1954 and led to rationalising development and introducing land=-use zoning. The plan sought to rationalize the development of Melbourne through land-use zoning and by reserving land for such future public purposes as roads, parks and schools. It was well received and widely acclaimed. In 1955 Borrie was awarded the Town and Country Planning Association (Victoria) (Sir James) Barrett medal. Lake Borrie at the MMBW Western Treatment Plan was named in his honour.

==== Albert (Bert) Ronalds ====
Albert Francis Ronalds (23 April 1913 – 10 May 1999) was awarded the degrees of bachelor and master of civil engineering at the University of Melbourne. He joined the Melbourne and Metropolitan Board of Works as Engineer-in-Chief in 1955 from the Snowy Mountains Hydro-Electric Authority, where he had served as Chief Civil Designing Engineer of the Snowy Mountains Scheme. He had earlier worked at the Melbourne Harbour Trust and the State Rivers and Water Supply Commission and was employed in the design and construction of the Yarrawonga Weir on the Murray River. His paper on the regulation of river flows was awarded the Warren Memorial Prize in 1948 by the Institution of Engineers Australia.

At the Board of Works he developed early trenchless technology to reduce the time, cost and disruption of sewer installation, and oversaw the construction of the Brooklyn Sewerage Pumping Station and the Upper Yarra Reservoir. In 1962 he published a master plan to meet the water requirements of the rapidly growing city to the new millennium, including diversion and damming of the Thomson River to form the Thomson Dam.

Ronalds resigned from the Board of Works in 1967 to become Chairman of the Victorian Pipelines Commission established to build transmission pipelines for the recently discovered natural gas fields in Bass Strait. His final appointment was to the Railway Construction Board, with responsibilities including planning for the Eastern Railway and the Melbourne Underground Rail Loop.
