= South East Water (Australia) =

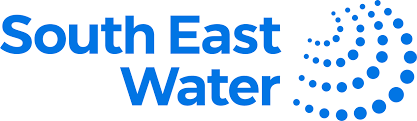

Agency overview
- Formed: 1 January 1995
- Jurisdiction: Government of Victoria
- Headquarters: 101 Wells Street Frankston, Melbourne, Victoria, Australia
- Employees: 600+
- Minister responsible: Minister for Water (Victoria)
- Agency executives: Lynn Warneke, Chair of the Board; Carla Purcell, Managing Director
- Website: http://southeastwater.com.au

South East Water is one of three Victorian Government owned retail water corporations that provides drinking water, sewerage, trade waste, recycled water and water-saving services for residents and businesses in an area ranging from the south-east of Melbourne to south Gippsland in Australia. The water distributed by South East Water is supplied by Melbourne Water, as is the infrastructure. Oversight is provided by the Department of Environment, Land, Water and Planning.

South East Water services the south eastern region of Melbourne, including the Mornington Peninsula.

In September 2015, South East Water moved its head office to a new building on the Frankston foreshore.

== Infrastructure ==
South East Water manages over:

- 14,041 kilometers of water mains
- 1,068+ kilometres of recycled water main
- Eight water recycling plants
- One stormwater treatment plant
- 10,995+ kilometres of sewer mains
- 273 sewage pump stations
- Nine recycled water pump stations
- 82 water pump stations
- 270 kilometres of coastline

As well as supplying recycled water produced from its own plants, South East Water is a major supplier of recycled water from the Eastern Treatment Plant.

South East Water manages the following recycled water schemes:

- South East outfall customers
- Domestic dual pipe schemes in the Cranbourne area.

== iota Services ==
South East Water has established a commercial division called iota Services, which is tasked with commercialising and marketing innovations, products and services from across the business. Current services cover a variety of applications for operations, maintenance, capital delivery and safety in the utility sector.
