= Edmund Gerald FitzGibbon =

Australian lawyer (1825–1905)

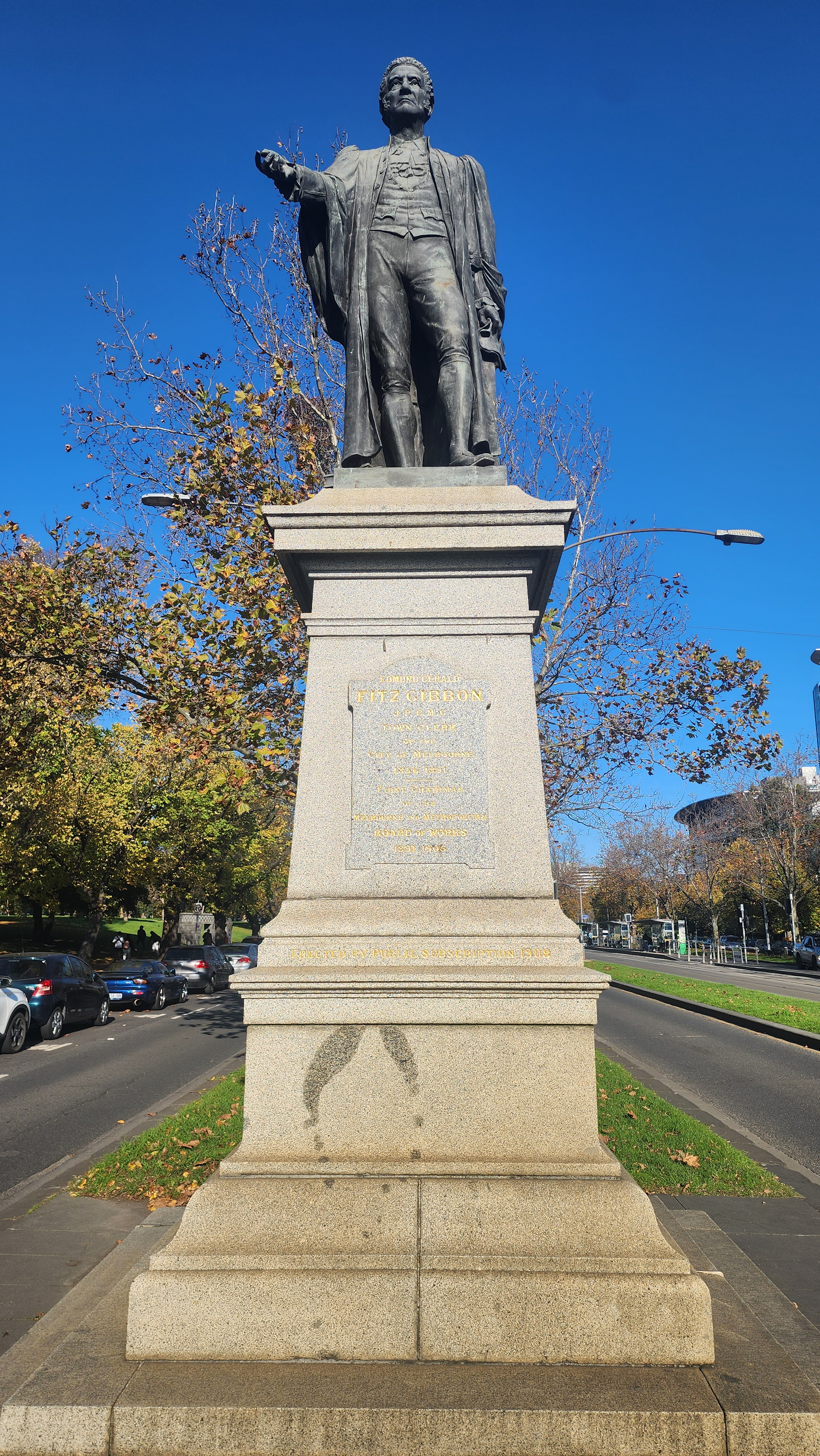
Statue of Edmund Gerald FitzGibbon in St Kilda Road, by sculptor, James White.

Edmund Gerald FitzGibbon CMG (1 November 1825 – 12 December 1905) was a barrister and Town clerk of Melbourne.

FitzGibbon was born in Cork, Ireland, son of Gibbon Carew FitzGibbon and his wife Catherine, née Hurley.

FitzGibbon worked as a clerk in London and migrated to Victoria in 1852. In 1854 FitzGibbon became a clerical assistant in the Melbourne City Council office. Two years later FitzGibbon became town clerk of Melbourne, a position he held until 1891.

In 1882, the Victorian government botanist, Ferdinand von Mueller, named Lasiopetalum fitzgibbonii in his honour.

In 1891 FitzGibbon became full-time chairman of the Melbourne and Metropolitan Board of Works. FitzGibbon was appointed C.M.G. in 1892.

He died 12 December 1905 and left an estate valued for probate at £47,915.
