= List of places on the Victorian Heritage Register in the City of Whittlesea =

This is a list of places on the Victorian Heritage Register in the City of Whittlesea in Victoria, Australia. The Victorian Heritage Register is maintained by the Heritage Council of Victoria.

The Victorian Heritage Register, as of 2020, lists the following 14 state-registered places within the City of Whittlesea:

Place name	Place #	Location	Suburb or Town	Co-ordinates	Built	State registered	Photo
Bear's Castle	H1420	Cades Lane	Yan Yean	37°32′18″S 145°08′07″E	c. 1846	9 October 1974	
Fashoda Homestead	H2312	330 Bridge Inn Rd	Mernda	37°35′54″S 145°04′12″E	c. 1855	11 October 2012	
Graff's Farm	H0915	1 Thomas St	Thomastown	37°40′39″S 145°00′31″E	1873	3 June 1992	
Horse-Drawn Stone-Carrying Sled	H2237	275 Oherns Rd	Epping	37°38′05″S 144°59′39″E	c. 1858	8 April 2010	
Old Bundoora Primary School	H1344	222 Plenty Rd	Bundoora	37°41′09″S 145°04′07″E	1877	18 September 1997	
Old South Morang Primary School	H1398	879 Plenty Rd	South Morang	37°38′50″S 145°05′28″E	1877	11 December 1997	
Maroondah Water Supply System (Note: Also listed on the VHR in the local government areas of Darebin, Nillumbik, and the Yarra Ranges Shire.) (upper and central sections)	H2381	various	Bundoora	multiple	1891	24 May 2018	
Siebel's Farmhouse	H1212	77 Mount View Rd	Thomastown	37°40′22″S 145°00′37″E	1860	24 October 1996	
Summerhill	H0958	585 Summerhill Rd	Wollert	37°34′59″S 144°57′52″E	1850s	8 November 2007	
Thomastown Lutheran Church and Cemetery	H0899	104-112 Gardenia Rd	Lalor	37°40′18″S 145°00′30″E	1856	13 May 1992	
Whittlesea Primary School	H1717	2425-2435 Plenty Rd	Whittlesea	37°30′52″S 145°06′49″E	1878	20 August 1982	
Wuchatsch's Farm	H0950	74 Robert St	Lalor	37°40′02″S 145°00′24″E	1850s	16 December 1992	
Yan Yean Water Supply System (Note: Also listed on the VHR in the local government areas of Mitchell, Darebin, and the City of Yarra.)	H2333	various	Whittlesea; Humevale; Yan Yean; Doreen; Mernda; South Morang; Mill Park; Bundoora	36°00′39″S 146°00′08″E	1853-57	12 December 2013	
Ziebell's Farm	H0979	100-102 Gardenia Rd	Thomastown	37°40′20″S 145°00′25″E	1850s	19 August 1993	
