= List of places on the Victorian Heritage Register in the Shire of Nillumbik =

This is a list of places on the Victorian Heritage Register in the Shire of Nillumbik in Victoria, Australia. The Victorian Heritage Register is maintained by the Heritage Council of Victoria.

The Victorian Heritage Register, as of 2020, lists the following nine state-registered places within the Shire of Nillumbik:

Place name	Place #	Location	Suburb or Town	Co-ordinates	Built	State registered	Photo
Burns House ('Kangaroo')	H2314	644 Henley Rd	Bend of Islands	37°41′58″S 145°17′02″E	1968	13 December 2012	
Eltham Court House	H0784	730 Main Rd	Eltham	37°43′21″S 145°08′46″E	1860	20 August 1982	
Police Quarters	H1539	728 Main Rd	Eltham	37°43′21″S 145°08′46″E	1859-60	20 August 1982	
Maroondah Water Supply System (Note: Also listed on the VHR in the local government areas of Darebin, Whittlesea, and the Yarra Ranges Shire.) (upper and central sections)	H2381	various	Christmas Hills; Kangaroo Ground; Research; Eltham; Diamond Creek; Greensborough; Bend of Islands	multiple	1891	24 May 2018	
Montsalvat	H0716	7–15 Hillcrest Ave	Eltham	37°43′41″S 145°09′09″E	1934-35	21 December 1988	
Pound Bend Gold Diversion Tunnel	H1260	Pound Bend Rd	Warrandyte	37°44′20″S 145°12′07″E	1870	19 December 1996	
Rice House	H0123	69 Ryans Rd	Eltham	37°42′35″S 145°08′18″E	1953-54	14 September 2006	
Southernwood	H2235	250 Bolton St	Eltham	37°43′19″S 145°08′14″E	1891	8 April 2010	
St Margaret's Church and Original Vicarage	H0459	10–12 John St	Eltham	37°43′14″S 145°08′50″E	1861	29 November 1979	
