= Melbourne Metropolitan Planning Scheme 1954 =

- Created: 1954
- Commissioned by: Melbourne and Metropolitan Board of Works
- Purpose: Metropolitan planning scheme

The Melbourne Metropolitan Planning Scheme 1954 was prepared for the Government of Victoria by the Melbourne and Metropolitan Board of Works. The scheme was approved in 1958 by the Board of Works, but did not become legally enforceable until 1968 when it was gazetted by the Minister for Local Government. The report recommended, amongst other things, a system of broad land-use zoning, a network of freeways and bypasses, and the regional allocation of public open space. The scheme identified five district centres of Footscray, Preston, Box Hill, Moorabbin and Dandenong. Local government authorities prepared local planning schemes which were intended to align with the Metropolitan Scheme's broad zones, but which frequently did not.

== Background ==
Following World War II, there was a general movement amongst state governments towards preparing metropolitan city plans to guide post-war urban expansion and economic development. In 1949 Victoria established the Town and Country Planning (Metropolitan Area) Act which empowered the MMBW to prepare a comprehensive plan for the metropolitan area of Melbourne.

== See also ==
- Greater London Plan (1944)
- County of Cumberland planning scheme, Sydney (1948)
- Plan for the Metropolitan Region, Perth and Fremantle (1955)
