= Reefton, Victoria =

Rural locality in Victoria, Australia

Reefton Victoria
- Coordinates: 37°39′S 145°52′E
- Population: 102 (2021 census)
- Postcode(s): 3799
- LGA(s): Shire of Yarra Ranges
- State electorate(s): Eildon
- Federal division(s): McEwen

Reefton is a locality in Victoria, Australia, on the Warburton Woods Point Road, located within the Shire of Yarra Ranges local government area. Reefton recorded a population of 102 at the 2021 census.

The Upper Yarra Reservoir lies within the locality.

== History ==
Reefton Post Office opened on 1 February 1877, and closed in 1886.
