= Lasiopetalum fitzgibbonii =

Conservation status
- Priority Three — Poorly Known Taxa (DEC)

Scientific classification
- Kingdom: Plantae
- Clade: Tracheophytes
- Clade: Angiosperms
- Clade: Eudicots
- Clade: Rosids
- Order: Malvales
- Family: Malvaceae
- Genus: Lasiopetalum
- Species: L. fitzgibbonii

Binomial name
- Lasiopetalum fitzgibbonii F.Muell.

Species of plant

Lasiopetalum fitzgibbonii is a species of flowering plant in the family Malvaceae and is endemic to the south-west of Western Australia. It is an erect, spreading shrub with hairy stems, needle-shaped leaves and blue, purple or pink flowers.

== Description ==
Lasiopetalum fitzgibbonii is an erect, spreading shrub that typically grows to a height of 0.3–1.5 m (1 ft 0 in – 4 ft 11 in) and has hairy stems. The leaves are needle-shaped, 7–18 mm (0.28–0.71 in) long and 1–2 mm (0.039–0.079 in) wide, the lower surface covered with star-shaped hairs. The flowers are borne on hairy pedicels 4–8 mm (0.16–0.31 in) long with hairy bracteoles 1.2–2.0 mm (0.047–0.079 in) long at the base of the sepals. The sepals are 4.5–9.5 mm (0.18–0.37 in) long, blue, purple or pink and hairy on the back, and the petals are reduced to small scales or lobes at the base of the ovary. There are five stamens with filaments 0.4–1 mm (0.016–0.039 in) long and the style is 3.2–4.5 mm (0.13–0.18 in) long. Flowering occurs from September to November.

== Taxonomy ==
Lasiopetalum fitzgibbonii was first formally described in 1882 by Ferdinand von Mueller in the journal Southern Science Record from specimens collected by George Maxwell "in the back-scrubs of the country at King George's Sound". The specific epithet (fitzgibbonii) honours Edmund Gerald FitzGibbon who "invariably exercised his extensive influence in also promoting scientific objects in our midst."

== Distribution and habitat ==
This lasiopetalum grows on undulating plains and hills in the Avon Wheatbelt, Coolgardie, Esperance Plains and Mallee biogeographic regions of south-western Western Australia.

== Conservation status ==
Lasiopetalum fitzgibbonii is listed as "Priority Three" by the Government of Western Australia Department of Biodiversity, Conservation and Attractions, meaning that it is poorly known and known from only a few locations but is not under imminent threat.
