= Maroondah Dam =

Dam in Central Victoria, Australia

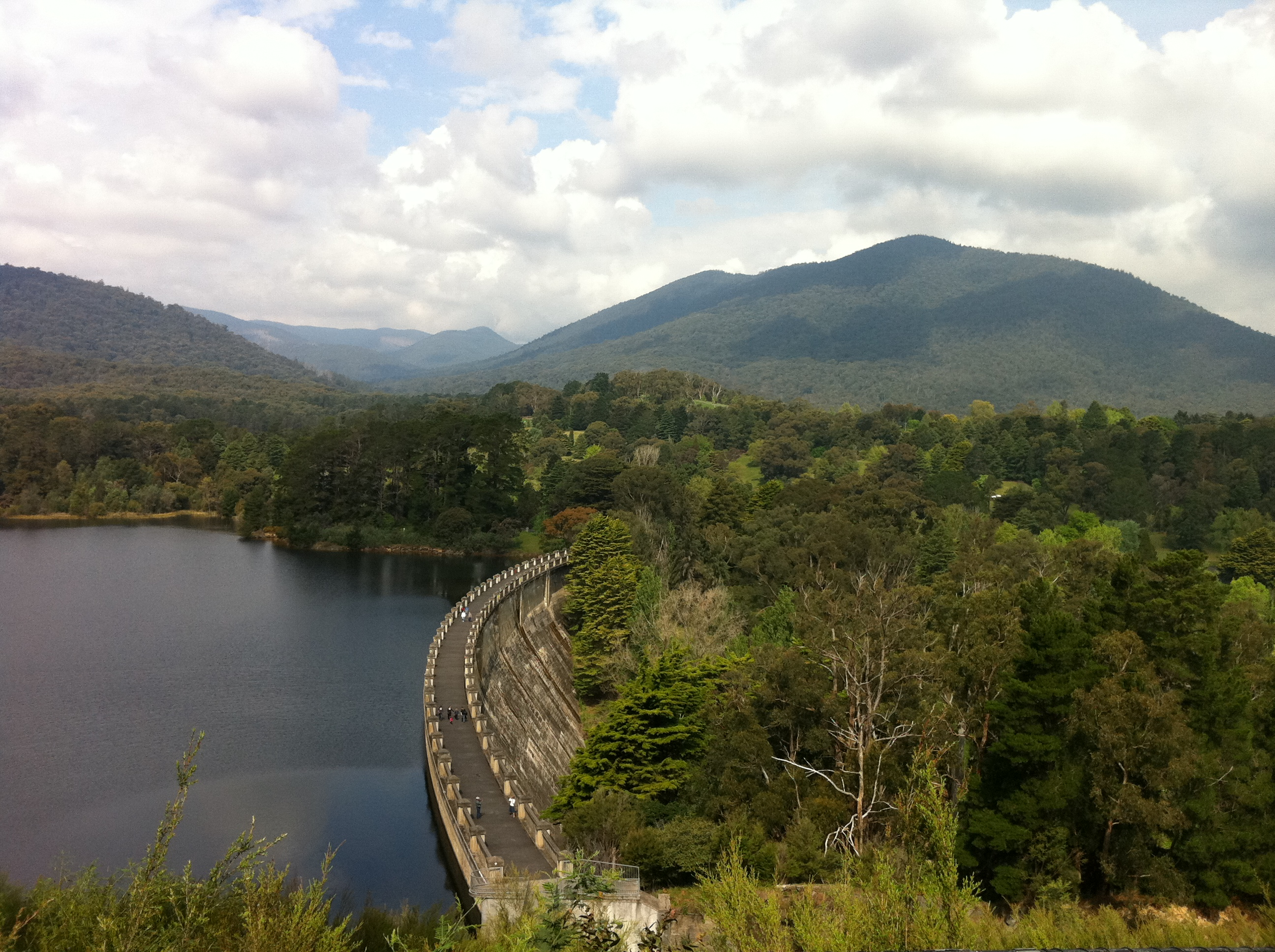
- The dam and reservoir at capacity, 2011

- Location of the dam in Victoria
- Interactive map of Maroondah Dam
- Country: Australia
- Location: Healesville, Central Victoria
- Coordinates: 37°38′31″S 145°33′05″E
- Purpose: Water supply
- Status: Operational
- Construction began: 1886 (aqueduct); October 1920 (reservoir and dam)
- Opening date: 18 February 1891; 135 years ago (aqueduct); 1927; 99 years ago (reservoir and dam)
- Operator: Melbourne Water

Dam and spillways
- Type of dam: Gravity dam
- Impounds: Watts River
- Height: 41 m (135 ft)
- Length: 291 m (955 ft)
- Dam volume: 132,000 m^{3} (4,700,000 cu ft)
- Spillway type: Uncontrolled concrete ogee-shaped overflow weir with rock channel chute
- Spillway capacity: 465 m^{3}/s (16,400 cu ft/s)

Reservoir
- Creates: Maroondah Reservoir
- Total capacity: 22,179 ML (17,981 acre⋅ft)
- Catchment area: 10,400 ha (26,000 acres)
- Surface area: 200 ha (490 acres)
- Normal elevation: 127 m (417 ft) AHD
- Website; Maroondah Reservoir at Melbourne Water
- Heritage-listed outlet tower, in 2008

Victorian Heritage Register
- Official name: Maroondah Water Supply System (1891)
- Type: Registered place
- Criteria: a., b., d., h.
- Designated: 24 May 2018
- Reference no.: H2381
- Heritage overlay nos.: HO174, HO177, HO179, HO2
- Category: Utilities - Water

Register of the National Estate
- Official name: Maroondah Reservoir (1927)
- Type: Defunct register
- Designated: undated
- Reference no.: 102589

The Maroondah Dam is a gravity dam across the Watts River, located near Healesville, in the Central region of Victoria, Australia. Completed in 1927, the resultant reservoir, Maroondah Reservoir, was created for the supply of potable water for Greater Metropolitan Melbourne. The dam and reservoir are operated by Melbourne Water.

The Maroondah Water Supply System, a system of water supply built between 1886 and 1891 on the traditional lands of the Wurundjeri people, was added to the Victorian Heritage Register on 24 May 2018 in recognition of its historical significance. The reservoir was also added, on unknown dates, to the non-statutory and now defunct Register of the National Estate, and to a non-statutory local government list.

== History ==
The Maroondah Water Supply System was operational by 1891 and was Melbourne's second large scale water supply system. The system was built because the Yan Yean Water Supply System, constructed from 1853, was no longer able to serve the growing population of Melbourne and the water quality was poor. During the early 1870s, the Watts River and its tributaries were surveyed and considered suitable for either a diversion weir or reservoir. The Watts River catchment was gazetted in 1886 and construction began on what was originally known as the Watts River System in the same year. The Watts River System comprised a weir on the Watts River east of Healesville and an aqueduct with open channels, tunnels and pipes which joined with the Yan Yean system at Junction Basin, Preston. The Watts River System was renamed the Maroondah Water Supply System when it was officially opened by the Governor of Victoria, the Earl of Hopetoun, on 18 February 1891.

Water supply was increased with additional weirs and aqueducts in 1893, and again in 1909. The second stage of the scheme was completed in 1927, with the construction of the dam and reservoir. Each stage incorporated picnic areas for the enjoyment of visitors, culminating with the construction of the Maroondah Reservoir Park in 1927. The upper section of the Maroondah Water Supply System remains operational, while the central section of the aqueduct was entirely decommissioned in the mid-2000s, and remains intact.

== Dam and reservoir overview ==
The dam was constructed in the 1920s by the Melbourne and Metropolitan Board of Works.

=== Dam ===
Following the Yan Yean and Toorourrong schemes, the Maroondah Dam scheme was the third water supply source for Melbourne. The Maroondah Aqueduct was built in 1886–1881 to supply water to the Preston Reservoir from a diversion weir on the Watts River. The level of the aqueduct was determined by the site of the proposed Maroondah Reservoir, preparatory work for which was undertaken in 1915–1919. Construction commenced in October 1920 and was completed in 1927. During that period, the capacity of the Maroondah Aqueduct was increased.

The rock-foundation concrete dam wall is 41 metres (135 ft) high and 291 metres (955 ft) long. When full, the resultant reservoir has a storage capacity of 28,200 megalitres (22,900 acre⋅ft) and covers 200 hectares (490 acres), drawn from a catchment area of 104 square kilometres (40 sq mi). The uncontrolled rock-chute spillway has a discharge capacity of 465 cubic metres per second (16,400 cu ft/s). In 1986, the reservoir spillway was widened to increase its flow capacity to that of a 1-in-10,000-year flood and, in 1989, the stability of the concrete dam was enhanced using ground anchors.

=== Reservoir ===
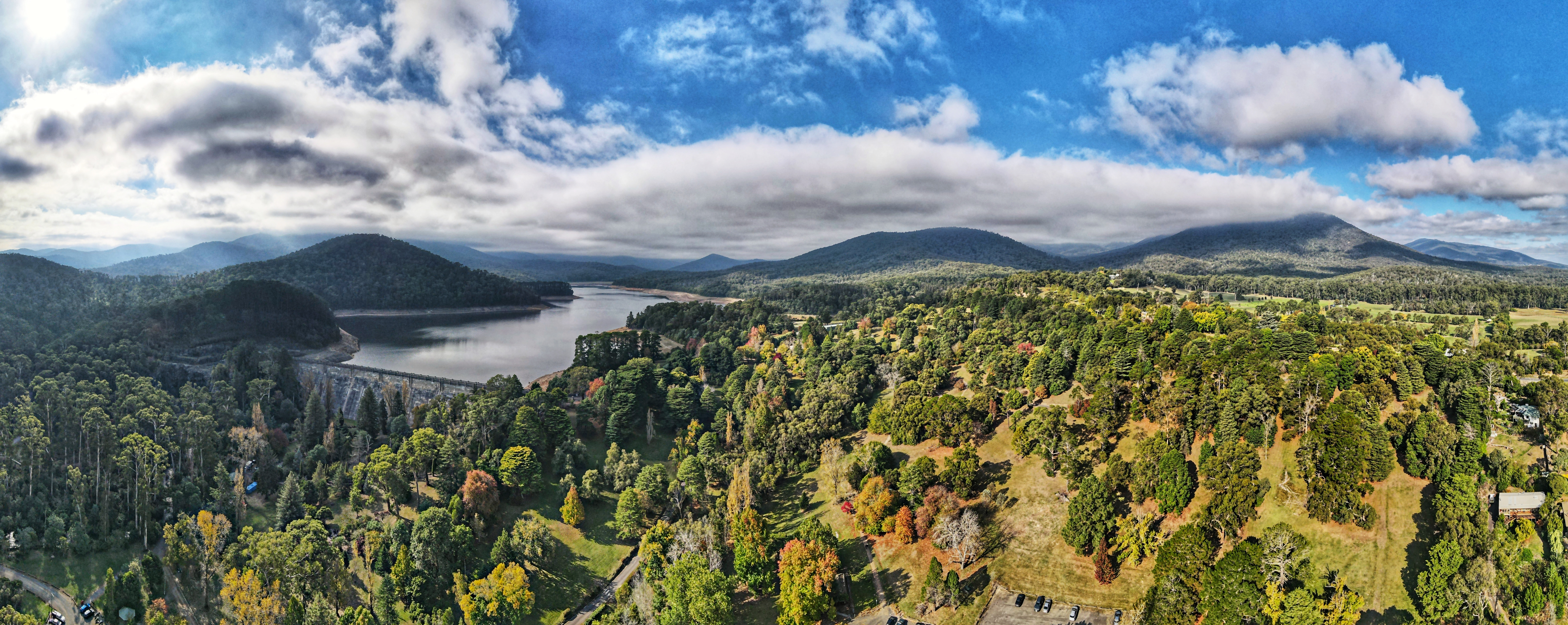
An aerial view of the reservoir, 2022

Like most of Melbourne's water harvesting reservoirs, the entire catchment is eucalypt forest completely closed to human activity, as is the reservoir itself. Immediately below the dam wall is the Maroondah Reservoir Park that features a large garden landscaped in an "English style" with many exotic plants very different from the surrounding native vegetation. A walking track leads across the dam, over the spillway, and up to a lookout from which much of the reservoir can be viewed.

== See also ==
- List of dams and reservoirs in Victoria
- List of places on the Victorian Heritage Register in the City of Darebin
- List of places on the Victorian Heritage Register in the City of Whittlesea
- List of places on the Victorian Heritage Register in the Shire of Nillumbik
- List of places on the Victorian Heritage Register in the Shire of Yarra Ranges
- Maroondah Aqueduct Trail
- Melbourne Water
- Yan Yean Water Supply System
