= O'Shannassy Dam =

Dam in Victoria, Australia

- Location of the dam in Victoria
- Country: Australia
- Location: McMahons Creek, Victoria
- Coordinates: 37°40′30″S 145°48′20″E
- Purpose: Water supply
- Status: Operational
- Construction began: 1922
- Opening date: 1928
- Operator: Melbourne Water

Dam and spillways
- Type of dam: Earth fill dam
- Impounds: O'Shannassy River
- Height: 34 m (112 ft)
- Length: 226 m (741 ft)
- Dam volume: 245,000 m^{3} (8,700,000 cu ft)
- Spillways: 1
- Spillway type: Uncontrolled
- Spillway capacity: 500 m^{3}/s (18,000 cu ft/s)

Reservoir
- Creates: O'Shannassy Reservoir
- Total capacity: 3.123 GL (2,532 acre⋅ft)
- Catchment area: 119 km^{2} (46 sq mi)
- Surface area: 27 ha (67 acres)
- Normal elevation: 359 m (1,178 ft) AHD
- Website melbournewater.com.au

The O'Shannassy Dam is an embankment dam across the O'Shannassy River, located near the locality of McMahons Creek, approximately 80 kilometres (50 mi) east of Melbourne, Victoria, Australia. Completed in 1928, the resultant eponymous reservoir, the O'Shannassy Reservoir, was formed for the supply of potable water for Greater Metropolitan Melbourne. The dam and reservoir are operated by Melbourne Water.

== Dam and reservoir overview ==
Built between 1922 and 1928, the concrete-faced earth-filled dam wall is 34 metres (112 ft) high and 226 metres (741 ft) long. When full, the resultant reservoir has a storage capacity of 3.123 gigalitres (2,532 acre⋅ft) and covers 27 hectares (67 acres), drawn from a catchment area of 119 square kilometres (46 sq mi). The uncontrolled spillway has a discharge capacity of 500 cubic metres per second (18,000 cu ft/s). In 1987, the spillway was enlarged and the full supply level was lowered.

The reservoir is part of Melbourne's water supply system. Water flows under gravity to Silvan Reservoir, then to storage and distribution reservoirs around Melbourne. It is the smallest of the water storage reservoirs managed by Melbourne Water, and it is on a very productive catchment, with stream flow averaging 80 gigalitres (65,000 acre⋅ft) per annum.

The location was selected as, at 359 metres (1,178 ft) AHD, it is at sufficient altitude for gravity supply to the elevated eastern suburbs of Melbourne. In 1914, a diversion weir on the O'Shannassy River and aqueduct to the Surrey Hills Reservoir in Melbourne were completed. The weir was complemented by the construction of the dam and its reservoir in 1928, but the weir was still used to divert river flows into the aqueduct. The construction of the Yarra-Silvan conduits in the 1950s resulted in reduced requirements for the aqueduct which was decommissioned in 1997.

== See also ==
- List of reservoirs and dams in Victoria
- Melbourne Water
