= Thomson Dam =

Dam in West Gippsland, Victoria

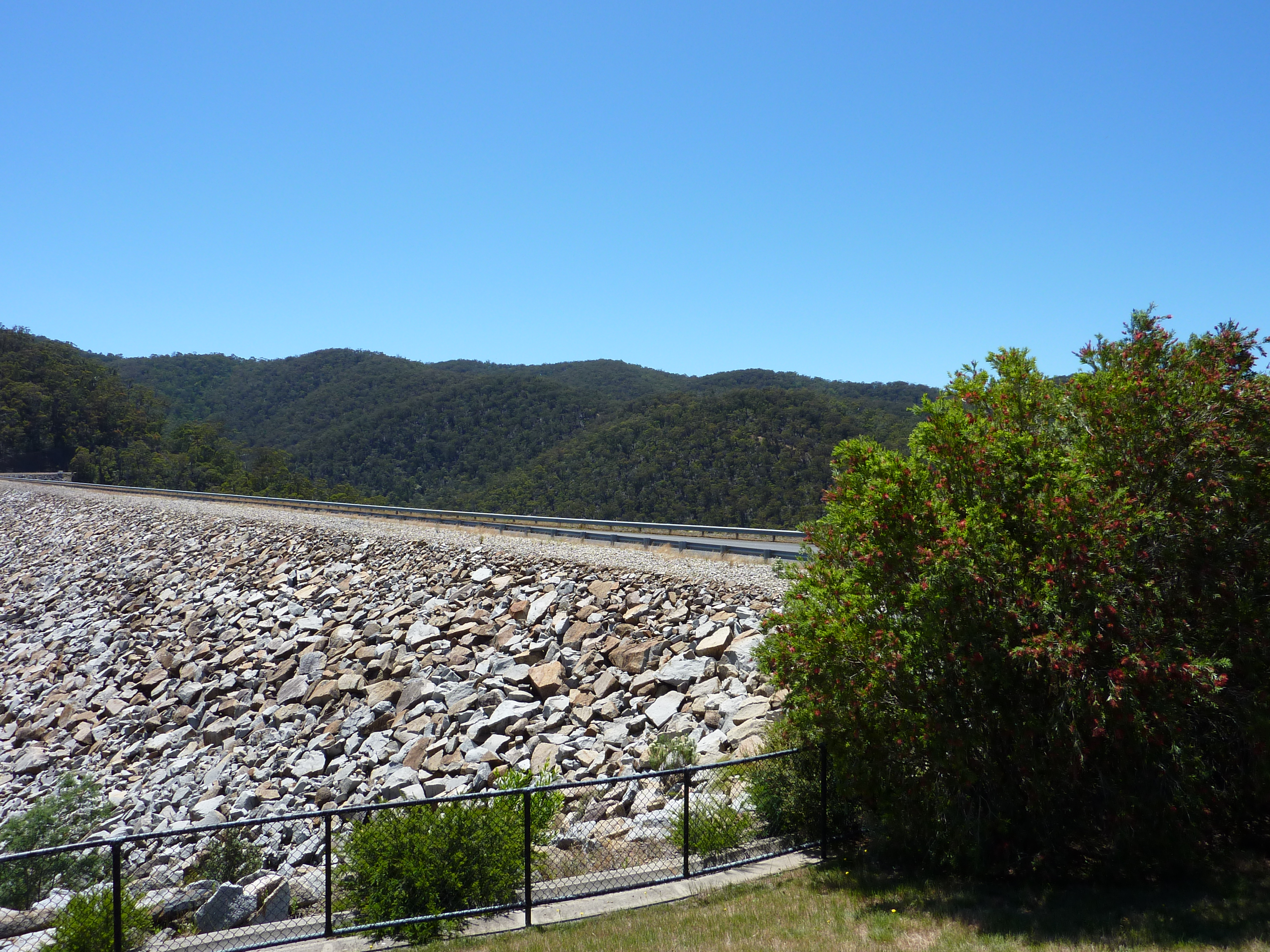
- The dam wall in 2009

- Location of the dam in Victoria
- Interactive map of Thomson Dam
- Country: Australia
- Location: West Gippsland, Victoria
- Coordinates: 37°50′34″S 146°23′56″E
- Purpose: Water supply; Irrigation; Power generation
- Status: Operational
- Construction began: 1976
- Opening date: 13 May 1983
- Operator: Melbourne Water

Dam and spillways
- Type of dam: Rock-fill dam
- Impounds: Thomson River
- Height (foundation): 166 m (545 ft)
- Length: 590 m (1,940 ft)
- Dam volume: 1.417×10^{6} m^{3} (50.0×10^{6} cu ft)
- Spillways: 1
- Spillway type: Uncontrolled ogee-shaped overflow weir and chute
- Spillway capacity: 1,040 m^{3}/s (37,000 cu ft/s)

Reservoir
- Creates: Thomson Reservoir (official); known as Lake Thomson
- Total capacity: 1,123.09 GL (910,500 acre⋅ft)
- Catchment area: 487 km^{2} (188 sq mi)
- Surface area: 223 ha (550 acres)
- Normal elevation: 494 m (1,621 ft) AHD

Power Station
- Operator: Melbourne Water
- Commission date: 1989
- Type: Conventional
- Installed capacity: 7.4 MW (9,900 hp)
- Annual generation: 60 GWh (220 TJ)
- Website melbournewater.com.au

The Thomson Dam is an embankment dam across the Thomson River, located about 130 kilometres (81 mi) east of Melbourne in the West Gippsland region of the Australian state of Victoria. Completed in 1983, the resultant eponymous reservoir is officially called Thomson Reservoir, sometimes called Lake Thomson and was created for the principal purpose of the supply of potable water for Greater Metropolitan Water.

The dam and reservoir are managed by Melbourne Water.

== Dam and reservoir overview ==
=== Dam ===
The dam is located near the former township of Beardmore and the Baw Baw National Park. Despite opposition from conservationists and farmers, plans for the dam were originally approved in late December 1975 to provide Melbourne with water security. A dam on the Thomson River was preferred because the river had a large flow, high water quality and was elevated high enough to provide water to the upper Yarra system by gravity flow.

Early work in the early 1970s saw construction of a 19-kilometre-long (12 mi) tunnel through the Thomson Yarra divide to allow water from the Thomson River to flow into the Upper Yarra Reservoir. Work on the dam itself commenced in 1976 and the completed dam and reservoir were ready to retain water by 1983. The dam was officially opened by Premier John Cain on 13 May 1983.

The rock-filled dam wall is 166 metres (545 ft) high and 590 metres (1,940 ft) long. When full, the reservoir has capacity of 1,123 gigalitres (910,000 acre⋅ft) and covers 223 hectares (550 acres), drawn from a catchment area of 487 square kilometres (188 sq mi). The ogee-shaped overflow weir and chute spillway has a flow capacity of 1,040 cubic metres per second (37,000 cu ft/s). Also completed in 1983, an additional 36-metre-high (118 ft) and 580-metre-long (1,900 ft) rock-filled saddle dam is located off-stream, adjacent to the main dam wall, that added an additional 514 megalitres (417 acre⋅ft) of storage capacity to the reservoir.

=== Reservoir ===
The reservoir is Melbourne's largest water storage and accounts for approximately sixty per cent of overall capacity. Despite flooding the reservoir in 1983, it took another six years until the reservoir was full enough to provide limited water releases.

The tunnel, which is located at the northern end of the reservoir, allows water to be transferred west to Upper Yarra Reservoir and then on to Silvan Reservoir for distribution as drinking water in Melbourne.

Between 1997 and 2011, drought depleted much of the reservoir's water. In early January 2006, the Thomson Dam was at 45.4%. While there were minor rises in water levels occasionally, the Thomson Dam reached its all-time low of 16.2% on 3 July 2009. Heavy rainfall in 2010 and 2011 increased Melbourne's water storages to levels not seen for ten years. The Thomson Dam entered winter 2011 at 39% full and by the end of 2011 had reached 54.4% full. On 28 October 2022, the dam reached 100% capacity and began spilling for the first time since the spring of 1996.

== Hydroelectric power station ==
Downstream releases from Thomson Reservoir pass through a 7.4-megawatt (9,900 hp) conventional hydroelectric power station, located at the base of the dam, which generates approximately 60 gigawatt-hours (220 TJ) of electricity annually that is fed into the state power grid. Commissioned in 1989, the plant was upgraded in 2012.

== Gallery ==
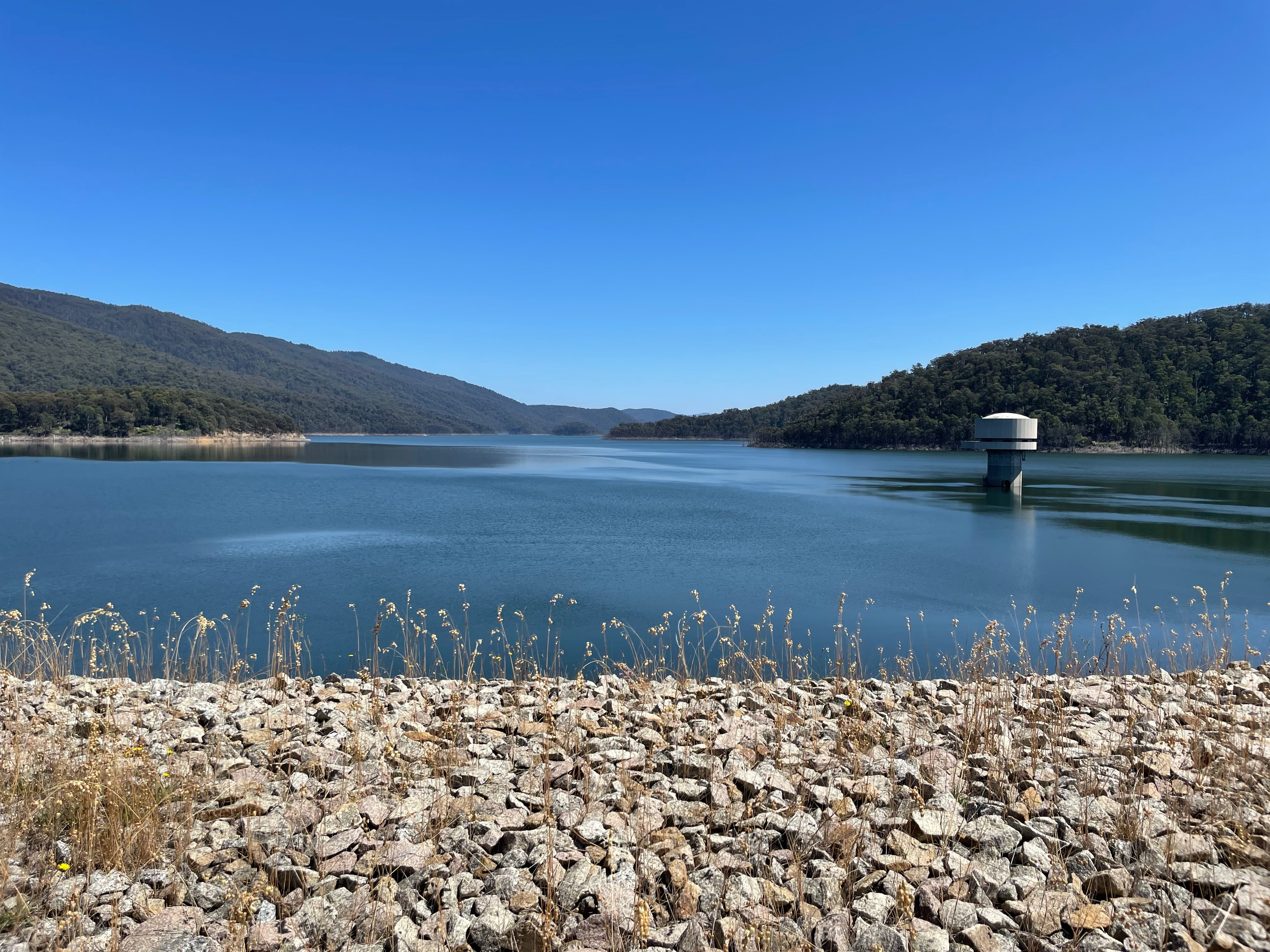
The reservoir near capacity, in 2025

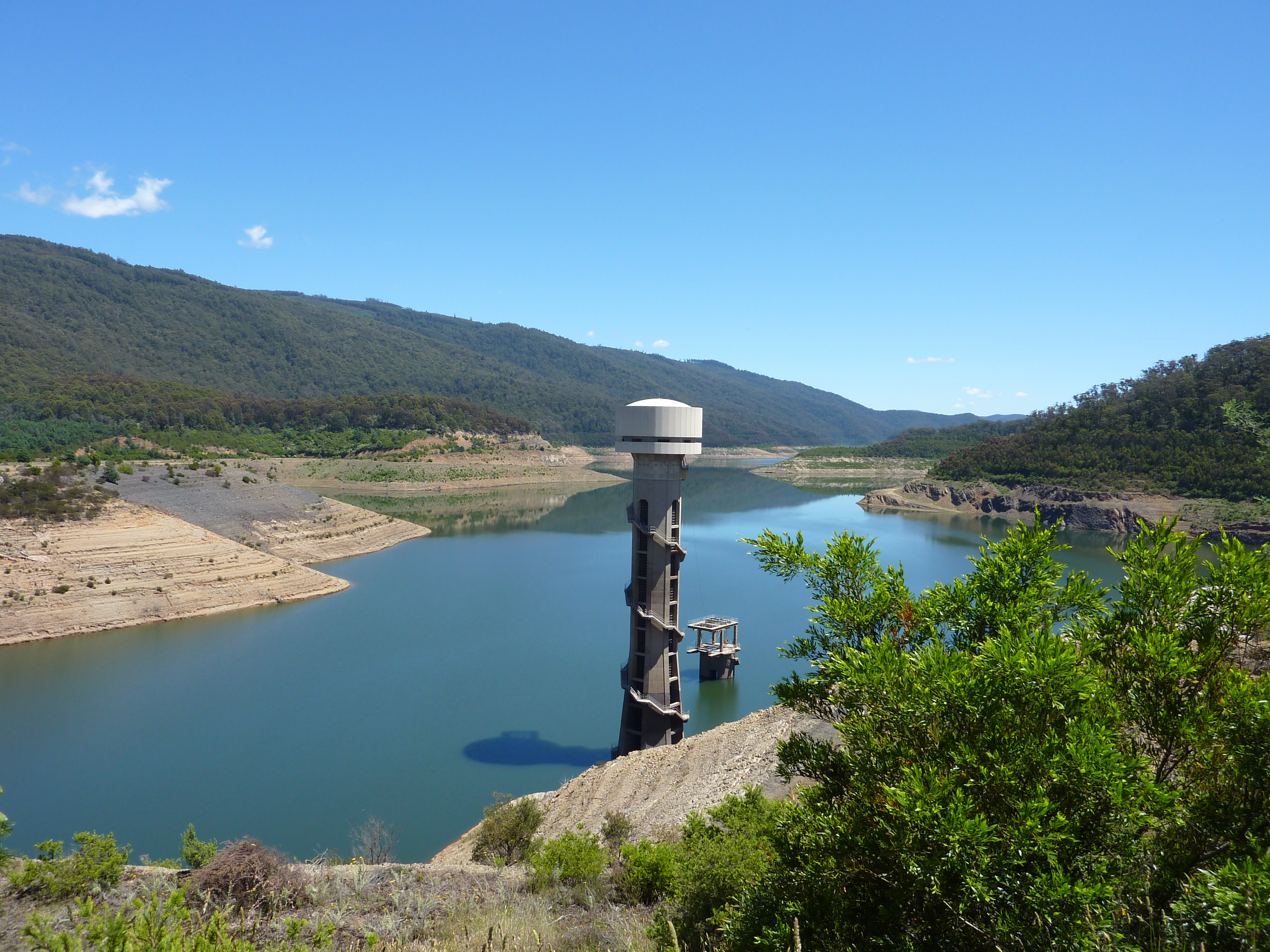
The reservoir during drought, in 2009

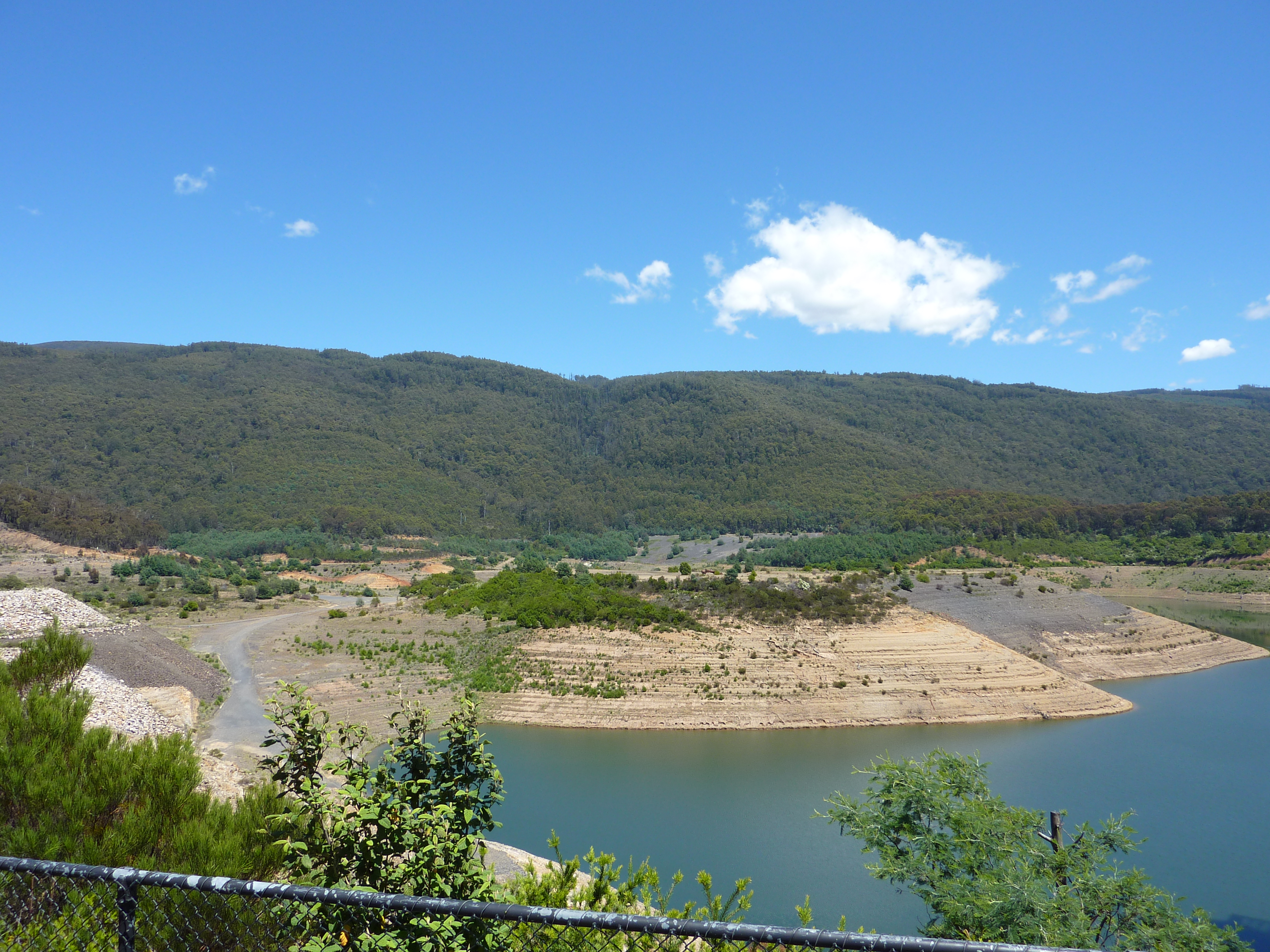
Significantly depleted reservoir in 2009

== See also ==
- List of reservoirs and dams in Australia § Victoria
- List of power stations in Victoria (state) § Hydroelectric
