= Watts River =

River in Victoria, Australia

Watts
- Mouth of the Watts River in Victoria
- Native name: Broong-ku-galk (Woiwurrung)

Location
- Country: Australia
- State: Victoria
- Region: South Eastern Highlands (IBRA), Central Victoria
- Local government area: Yarra Ranges Shire
- Town: Healesville

Physical characteristics
- Source: Yarra Ranges, Great Dividing Range
  - location: below Mount Vinegar
  - coordinates: 37°39′31″S 145°41′58″E
  - elevation: 865 m (2,838 ft)
- Mouth: confluence with the Yarra River
  - location: south of Healesville
  - coordinates: 37°39′55″S 145°29′20″E
  - elevation: 77 m (253 ft)
- Length: 29 km (18 mi)

Basin features
- River system: Port Phillip and Western Port catchment
- Tributaries
  - right: Meyers Creek

The Watts River is a perennial river of the Port Phillip and Western Port catchment, in the Healesville area, in the Central region of the Australian state of Victoria.

== Location and features ==
The Watts River rises below Mount Vinegar in the Yarra Ranges, a part of the Great Dividing Range, within the Watts River Reference Area, near the settlement of Somers Park, north-east of Healesville. The river flows generally south, then north-west, then south-west, where it is impounded by the Maroondah Dam to create the 22,000-megalitre (780×10^{6} cu ft) Maroondah Reservoir. After flowing over the dam spillway, the river flows generally west by south, joined by Meyers Creek, before reaching its confluence with the Yarra River south of Healesville. The river descends 788 metres (2,585 ft) over its 29-kilometre (18 mi) course.

Watts River became part of Melbourne's water supply system in 1891, with the construction of a diversion weir and the Maroondah Aqueduct. At that time, the catchments were closed and cleared of human habitation. The river was dammed in 1927 to form the Maroondah Reservoir, which is largely contained in the forested reservoir catchment within the Yarra Ranges National Park.

The river is traversed by the Maroondah Highway, upriver of the Maroondah Reservoir.

== Naming ==
In the Aboriginal Woiwurrung language, the name of the river is Broong-ku-galk, with galk meaning "timber" or "sticks".

The European name derives from the surname of a stockman who drowned in the river in about 1843.

== See also ==
- Geography of the Yarra River
- List of rivers of Australia § Victoria
- Maroondah Water Supply System
