= Melbourne Water =

Water authority in Victoria, Australia

Statutory authority overview
- Formed: 1992; 34 years ago
- Preceding agencies: Melbourne and Metropolitan Board of Works; various local water authorities
- Jurisdiction: Water supply and sewerage in Greater Metropolitan Melbourne, Victoria
- Headquarters: Melbourne
- Minister responsible: Harriet Shing, Minister for Water
- Statutory authority executives: John Thwaites, Chairman; Nerina Di Lorenzo, Managing Director
- Website: melbournewater.com.au

Melbourne Water is an Australian statutory authority owned by the Victorian government, which controls and manages much of the water bodies and supplies in metropolitan Melbourne, the capital of Victoria. Its jurisdiction includes all the reservoirs, lakes, wetlands, canals and urban creeks, and the sewerage and drainage systems that services the city.

Melbourne Water was formed by the merger of Melbourne and Metropolitan Board of Works and a number of smaller urban water authorities by the Melbourne Water Corporation Act 1992 (No. 54 of 1992). Melbourne Water primarily operates under the Water Industry Act 1994 and the Water Act 1989.

== Overview ==
Melbourne Water is wholly owned by the Victorian government. It manages Melbourne's water supply catchments, sewage, rivers and major drainage systems throughout the Port Phillip and Westernport region. Governance of Melbourne Water is by an independent board of directors in conjunction with the Minister for Water.

Melbourne Water supplies water to the metropolitan retail water businesses; namely, Greater Western Water, South East Water and Yarra Valley Water, other water authorities, local councils and the land development industry. The Victorian Water Industry Association (VicWater) is the peak industry association for water companies in Victoria.

In 1994, Melbourne Parks and Waterways was separated from Melbourne Water, and became part of Parks Victoria in 1996.

=== Victorian Desalination Plant ===
The Victorian Desalination Plant is an A$3.1 billion desalination plant that was built in the Wonthaggi region of the Bass Coast. The plant can provide an additional 150 gigalitres (5.3×10^{9} cu ft) of water each year. The base fee payable to the owner of the plant, even if no water is ordered, is $608 million a year, or $1.8 million per day, for 27 years, being between $18- and $19 billion in total. On 1 April each year, the Minister for Water places an order for the following financial year, up to 150 GL (5.3×10^{9} cu ft) a year, at an additional cost to Melbourne Water and consumers.

=== Northern Sewerage Project ===
Northern Sewerage Project is a major infrastructure project to increase the capacity of the sewerage system in Melbourne's growing northern suburbs. It will also help protect the Merri and Moonee Ponds Creeks by virtually eliminating sewage overflows that can occur after heavy rain.

== Water restrictions ==
Melbourne Water has a system of restrictions to manage water supplies into the future. It reports on storage levels on Thursday each week while an interactive graph compares actual use. Further reviews of restrictions were needed to counter an ongoing drought, poor rainfall, record low storage levels and rising water use compared with past years.

== Infrastructure ==
The water supply system operated and managed by Melbourne Water comprises:

- catchments covering more than 140,000 hectares (350,000 acres)
- ten major storage reservoirs with a capacity of 1,810,500 megalitres (63,940×10^{6} cu ft)
- 64 service reservoirs that provide short-term storage.
- about 1,300 kilometres (810 mi) of distribution mains and aqueducts
- 18 water pumping stations, used to pump water from low-lying areas to higher areas
- five water filtration plants
- 49 water treatment (disinfection) plants

=== Water storages ===
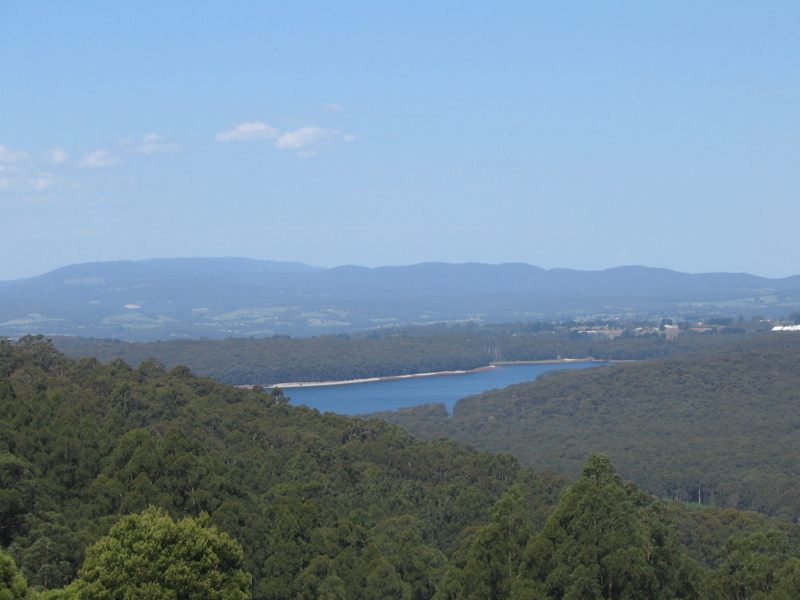
Silvan Reservoir

Melbourne Water manages the ten Melbourne reservoirs. The total storage capacity is 1,810,500 megalitres (63,940×10^{6} cu ft).

Melbourne reservoirs
Reservoir	Capacity		Year completed	Location
Reservoir	ML	acre ft	Year completed	Location
Cardinia	287,000	233,000	1973	37°57′49″S 145°24′37″E
Greenvale	27,000	22,000	1971	37°37′53″S 144°54′17″E
Maroondah	22,000	18,000	1927	37°38′05″S 145°33′47″E
O'Shannassy	3,000	2,400	1928	37°40′30″S 145°48′20″E
Silvan	40,000	32,000	1932	37°50′S 145°25′E
Sugarloaf	96,000	78,000	1981	37°40′30″S 145°18′18″E
Tarago	37,500	30,400	1969	38°1′S 145°56′E
Thomson	1,068,000	866,000	1983	37°50′34″S 146°23′56″E
Upper Yarra	200,000	160,000	1957	37°41′S 145°55′E
Yan Yean	30,000	24,000	1857	37°33′S 145°08′E

=== Water supply catchments ===
Around 80% of Melbourne's water is sourced from uninhabited forests in the Yarra Ranges and Central Highlands. In excess of 1,570 square kilometres (610 sq mi) is reserved for water catchment. These forests primarily consist of mountain ash. Catchment areas have been closed to the public for over 100 years .

Major catchments
Catchment	Area		Inflow (%)	Comments
Catchment	ha	acre	Inflow (%)	Comments
Maroondah	16,540	40,900	10.8	within the Yarra Ranges National Park
O'Shannassy	11,870	29,300	11.4	within the Yarra Ranges National Park
Sugarloaf	0	0	10.7	water is pumped from the Yarra River and fully treated
Thomson	48,700	120,000	35.3	mainly State Forest and a small section within Baw Baw National Park
Upper Yarra	33,670	83,200	18.7	within the Yarra Ranges National Park
Wallaby	9,100	22,000	1.9	within the Kinglake National Park
Yarra tributaries	13,480	33,300	3.8	Armstrong, Cement, McMahons and Starvation Creeks (State Forest)
Total			92.6	

In addition to the reservoirs in the table above, water is harvested via a number of diversion weirs:

Point	Coordinates (links to map & photo sources)	Notes
Armstrong Creek Weir	37.637°S 145.860°E	To Silvan Reservoir
Armstrong Creek – East Branch Weir	37.638°S 145.864°E	To Silvan Reservoir
Badger Creek Weir	37.686°S 145.582°E	To Silvan Reservoir
Cement Creek Weir	37.71°S 145.75°E	To Silvan Reservoir
Donnelly Weir	37.628°S 145.536°E	To Maroondah Aqueduct
Grace Burn Creek Weir	37.655°S 145.574°E	To Maroondah Reservoir
McMahons Creek Weir	37.72°S 145.88°E	To Silvan Reservoir
Sawpit Creek Weir	37.634°S 145.542°E	To Maroondah Aqueduct
Silver Creek Weir	37.356171°S 145.209854°E	To Toorourrong Reservoir
Starvation Creek Weir	37.76°S 145.85°E	To Silvan Reservoir
Toorourrong Reservoir	37.475430°S 145.152296°E	
Wallaby Creek Weir	37.404495°S 145.246650°E	To Toorourrong Reservoir

Clearfell logging is permitted in the Yarra Tributaries and Thomson catchment areas. Some studies claims this reduces Melbourne's water supply arguing that young regrowth forest uses more water than existing forests. Some environmental groups claim that up to 30,000 megalitres (1,100×10^{6} cu ft) of water could be saved per annum by phasing out logging. This represents 6% of Melbourne's annual usage.

== See also ==
- Eastern Treatment Plant
- Lakes and reservoirs of Melbourne
- List of reservoirs and dams in Australia
- Maroondah Water Supply System
- National Council for Fire & Emergency Services
- Water management in Victoria
- Western Treatment Plant
- Yan Yean Water Supply System
