= O'Shannassy River =

O'Shannassy Ligar River East Branch, O'Shannassy River East Branch
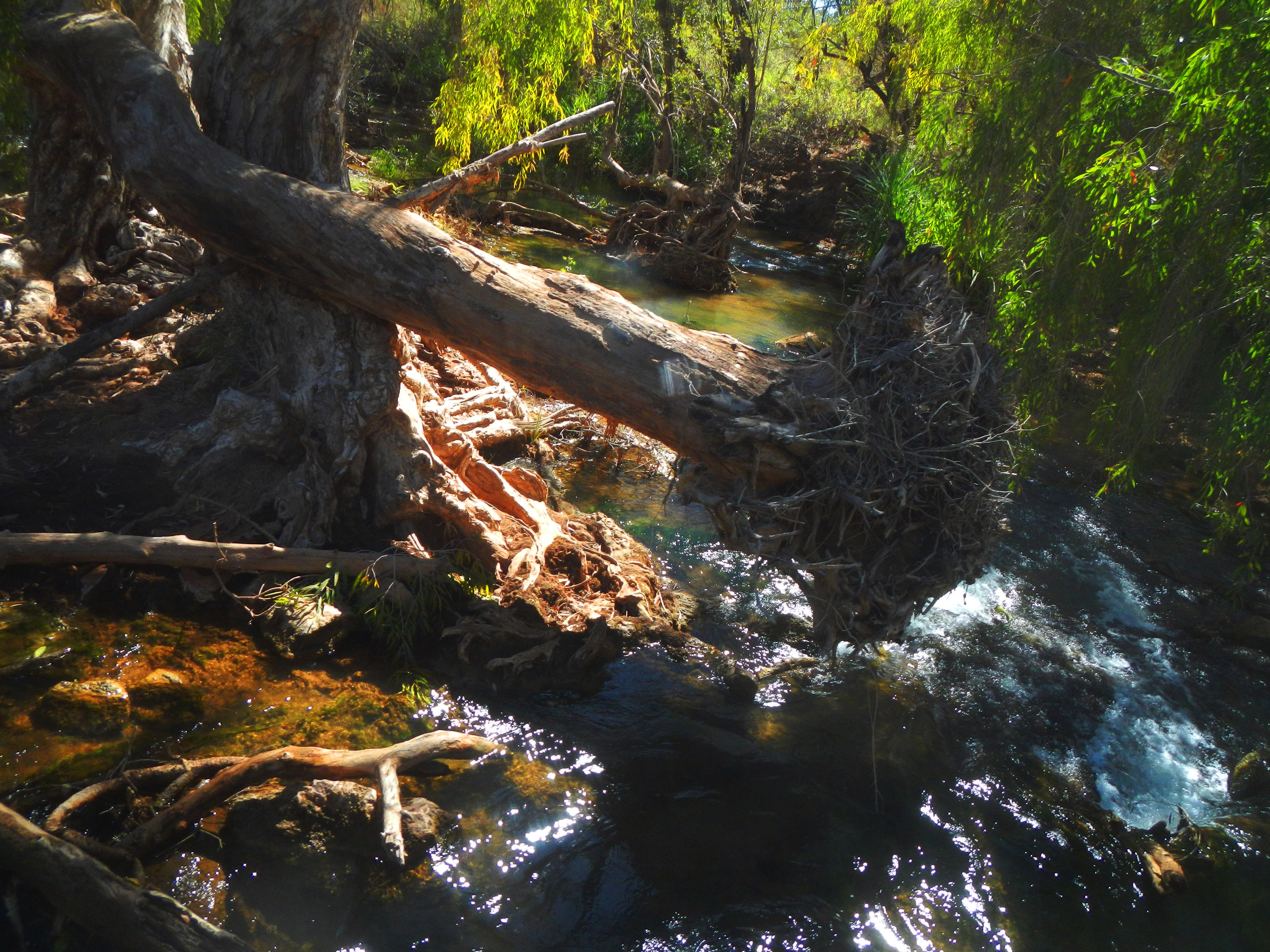
- O'Shannassy River Crossing

- Location of the O'Shannassy River mouth in Victoria
- Etymology: In honour of John O'Shanassy [sic]

Location
- Country: Australia
- State: Victoria
- Region: South Eastern Highlands (IBRA), Greater Metropolitan Melbourne
- Local government area: Yarra Ranges Shire

Physical characteristics
- Source: Yarra Ranges, Great Dividing Range
  - location: below Mount Observation
  - coordinates: 37°33′29″S 145°49′28″E
  - elevation: 744 m (2,441 ft)
- Mouth: confluence with the Yarra River
  - location: west of McMahons Creek
  - coordinates: 37°42′43″S 145°45′34″E
  - elevation: 338 m (1,109 ft)
- Length: 15 km (9.3 mi)

Basin features
- River system: Port Phillip catchment
- Tributaries
  - right: Deep Creek (Yarra Ranges, Victoria), Smith Creek (Yarra Ranges, Victoria)
- National park: Yarra Ranges National Park

The O'Shannassy River is a perennial river of the Port Phillip catchment, in the north-eastern Greater Metropolitan Melbourne region of the Australian state of Victoria.

== Location and features ==
The O'Shannassy River rises within the Yarra Ranges National Park on the slopes of the Yarra Ranges, within the Great Dividing Range, below Mount Observation, approximately 80 kilometres (50 mi) east of Melbourne. The river flows generally south by southwest, joined by two minor tributaries, before being impounded to create the O'Shannassy Reservoir, part of Melbourne's water supply system. Below the reservoir the natural flow of the river is diverted via the O’Shannassy Aqueduct and then reaches its confluence with the Yarra River west of the locality of McMahons Creek. The river descends approximately 406 metres (1,332 ft) over its 15-kilometre (9.3 mi) course, before being diverted via the aqueduct.

The O’Shannassy River catchment is identified as an Essentially Natural Catchment by the Land Conservation Council.

== Etymology ==
The river is named after John O'Shanassy [sic], the second Premier of Victoria.

== See also ==
- List of rivers of Australia § Victoria
