= Toorourrong Reservoir =

Reservoir and dam in Victoria, Australia

Toorourrong Dam
- Location of the dam and reservoir in Victoria
- Interactive map of Toorourrong Dam
- Country: Australia
- Location: Whittlesea, Victoria
- Coordinates: 37°28′32″S 145°09′08″E
- Purpose: Water supply
- Status: Operational
- Construction began: 1883
- Opening date: 1885
- Designed by: William Thwaites
- Operator: Melbourne Water

Dam and spillways
- Type of dam: Earth fill dam
- Impounds: Plenty River; Off-stream

Reservoir
- Creates: Toorourrong Reservoir

The Toorourrong Reservoir is a reservoir, formed by the Toorourrong Dam, an embankment dam across the Plenty River and an interbasin transfer, located on the southern slopes of the Great Dividing Range approximately 40 kilometres (25 mi) north of Melbourne, Victoria, Australia. Completed in 1885, the purpose of the reservoir is for the supply of potable water for Greater Metropolitan Melbourne. Water from the Toorourrong Reservoir flows by aqueduct to the Yan Yean Reservoir.

== Dam and reservoir overview ==
=== History ===
The Yan Yean Reservoir, completed in 1857, was Melbourne's first water supply system. In 1879 low dam levels showed that further water sources were necessary to meet increased demand by a growing population. The Wallaby Creek aqueduct was constructed in 1882–1883 to divert water via an interbasin transfer from Wallaby Creek via Jacks Creek and the Plenty River to Yan Yean.

The earth-filled embankment was constructed between1883 and 1885 and linked to the Yan Yean Reservoir by the Clearwater Channel aqueduct, and the Wallaby Creek aqueduct was extended north to harvest Silver Creek. William Thwaites, a Public Works department engineer, designed most of these works. As water quality in the lower Plenty River had deteriorated, the intake from the river at Yan Yean Reservoir was closed and all water supply was drawn from the closed forest catchments via the Toorourrong Reservoir.

The dam, reservoir, and associated works are listed by the National Trust on the Victorian Heritage Inventory.

== Dam details ==
The dam is situated on the eastern branch of the Plenty River below the junction with Jacks Creek. Water is diverted from Wallaby and Silver Creeks, part of the Murray–Darling basin on the northern side of the Great Dividing Range—via the open, granite-lined Wallaby Aqueduct—across the Great Dividing Range just east of Mount Disappointment, then into Jacks Creek and into the reservoir. The reservoir acts as a settling basin before the water travels 8 kilometres (5 mi) down the Clearwater Channel to the Yan Yean Reservoir. The reservoir catchments are within the Wallaby Creek section of the Kinglake National Park.

A safety review in 2006 recommended remedial works be undertaken on the dam. Grouted stone columns were installed on both the upstream and downstream sides of the dam wall in 2011.

== Toorourrong Reservoir Park ==
Toorourrong Reservoir Park
- Interactive map of Toorourrong Reservoir Park
- Type: Nature reserve
- Location: Whittlesea, Victoria
- Coordinates: 37°28′36″S 145°09′02″E
- Area: 12 ha (30 acres)
- Operator: Parks Victoria
- Status: Open
- Website: parks.vic.gov.au

Below the dam wall is the 12-hectare (30-acre) Toorourrong Reservoir Park. The park and surrounding forest were burned in the 2009 Victorian bushfires, and was re-opened to the public.

In 2011, the City of Whittlesea's Bushfires Memorial Working Group selected Toorourrong Reservoir Park as a site for a memorial to remember the impact of the Victorian bushfires on the local community.

There is a platypus-watching hide overlooking the reservoir. The Australian Platypus Conservatory was based at the reservoir from 1996 to 2007 and at that time the area supported approximately 30 platypus. The population was disturbed by the 2009 bushfires and was believed extinct in 2018.

== See also ==
- List of reservoirs and dams in Victoria
- Protected areas of Victoria
