= Plenty River (Victoria) =

Plenty
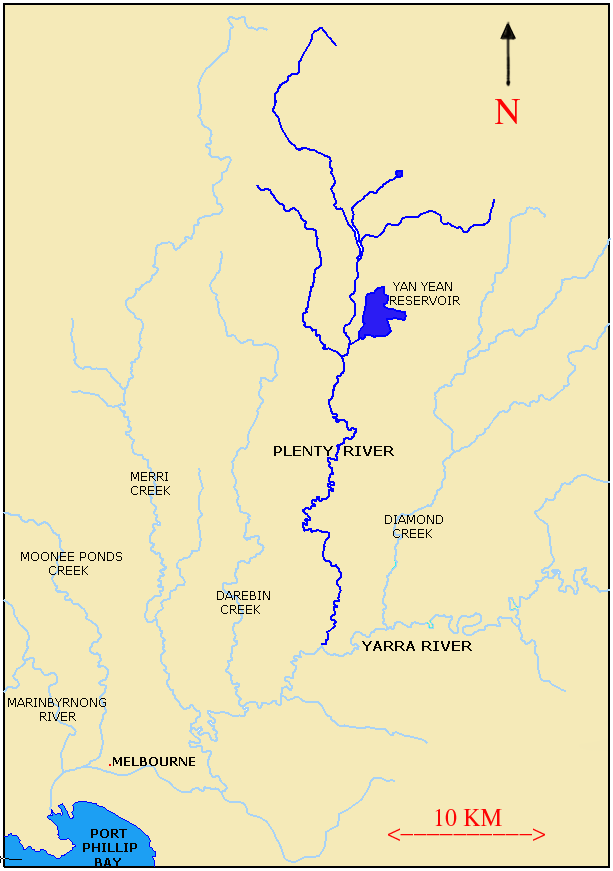
- Course of the Plenty River
- Native name: Kurrum (Woiwurrung)

Location
- Country: Australia
- State: Victoria
- Region: South East Coastal Plain (IBRA), Greater Melbourne
- Local government area: City of Whittlesea
- Towns: Whittlesea, Mernda

Physical characteristics
- Source: Mount Disappointment
  - location: near Humevale
  - elevation: 247 m (810 ft)
- Mouth: confluence with the Yarra River
  - location: near Rosanna
  - coordinates: 37°44′56″S 145°5′53″E
  - elevation: 20 m (66 ft)
- Length: 47 km (29 mi)

Basin features
- River system: Port Phillip catchment
- Tributaries
  - right: Scrubby Creek, Bruces Creek, Barber Creek

The Plenty River is a perennial river of the Port Phillip catchment, in the north-eastern Greater Melbourne region of the Australian state of Victoria.

== Course and features ==
The Plenty River rises in the forested slopes of Mount Disappointment, northwest of Humevale. The river flows generally south, joined by three minor tributaries, before reaching its confluence with the Yarra River southeast of Rosanna. The river descends 227 metres (745 ft) over its 47-kilometre (29 mi) course.

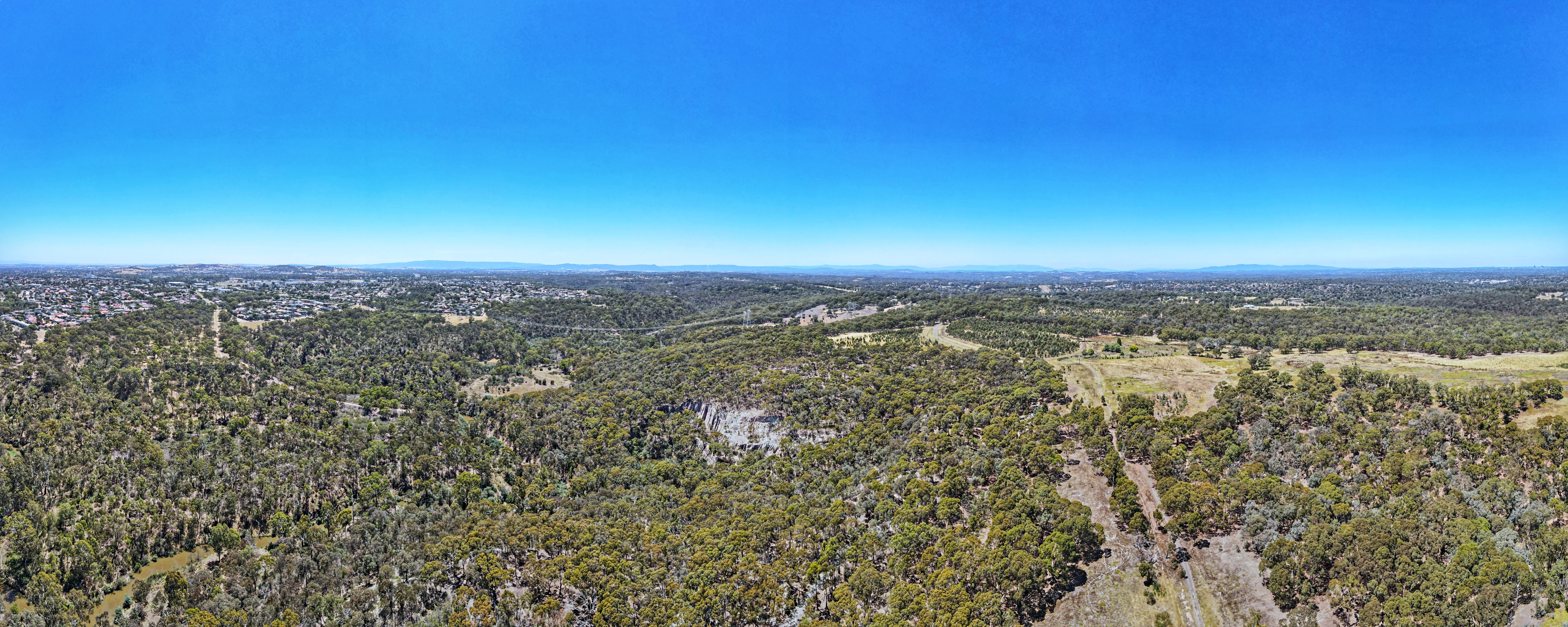
View of the great dividing range from Plenty Gorge. Jan 2021

The river is impounded by the Toorourrong Reservoir and is the source of Melbourne's first major water supply reservoir, the Yan Yean Reservoir, completed in 1857.

The river runs through the Plenty Gorge Park, a metropolitan regional park, for 11 kilometres (6.8 mi) in a north-south alignment – from its northern periphery along Bridge Inn Road at Mernda to its southern periphery along the Metropolitan Ring Road at Bundoora and Greensborough. The park contains a range of natural, historic, cultural, and recreational features and sites, including significant biodiversity and geomorphology.

The Plenty River Trail, a shared-use trail, follows the Plenty River from north of the Western Ring Road in Greensborough to its joining with the Yarra River Trail in Viewbank.

== See also ==
- Plenty, Victoria
- Lower Plenty, Victoria
