= Yan Yean Reservoir =

Reservoir and dam in Victorian, Australia

Yan Yean Dam
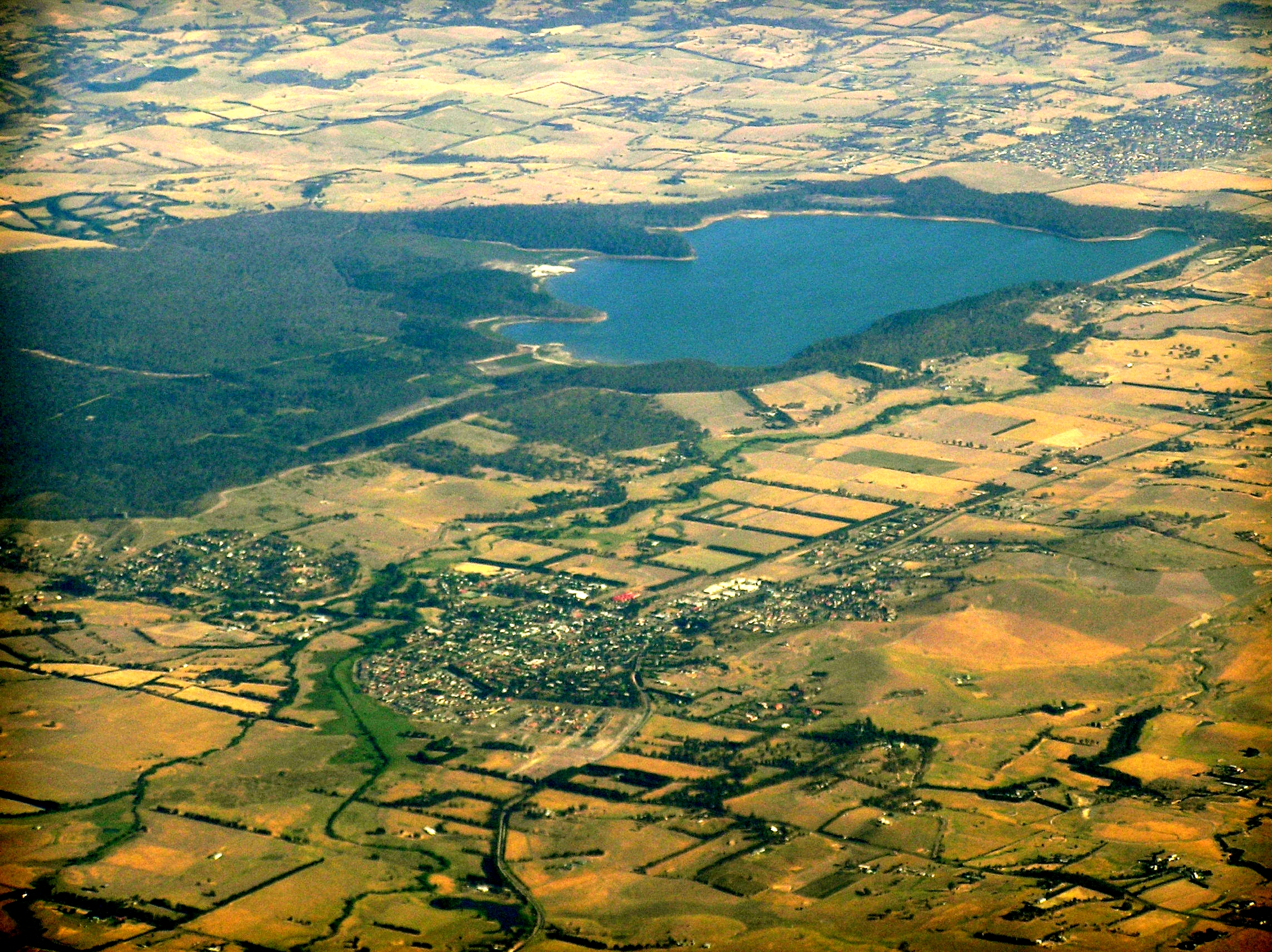
- The reservoir with Whittlesea in the foreground

- Location of the dam and reservoir in Victoria
- Interactive map of Yan Yean Dam
- Country: Australia
- Location: Whittlesea, Victoria
- Coordinates: 37°33′48″S 145°07′29″E
- Purpose: Water supply
- Status: Operational
- Construction began: 20 December 1853
- Opening date: 31 December 1857
- Construction cost: A£750,000 – A£1,017,087
- Built by: Victorian Water Supply Department
- Designed by: James Blackburn
- Operator: Melbourne Water

Dam and spillways
- Type of dam: Earth fill dam
- Impounds: Plenty River; off-stream
- Height (foundation): 10 m (33 ft)
- Length: 963 m (3,159 ft)
- Dam volume: 206×10^{3} m^{3} (7.3×10^{6} cu ft)
- Spillway type: Uncontrolled
- Spillway capacity: 12 m^{3}/s (420 cu ft/s)

Reservoir
- Creates: Yan Yean Reservoir
- Total capacity: 33,085 ML (26,822 acre⋅ft)
- Catchment area: 23 km^{2} (8.9 sq mi)
- Surface area: 560 ha (1,400 acres)
- Normal elevation: 180 m (590 ft) AHD
- Website melbounrewater.com.au

The Yan Yean Reservoir is a reservoir created by the Yan Yean Dam, an embankment dam across the Plenty River and supplemented by off-stream storage that is part of the Yan Yean Water Supply System, located within the eponymous locality of Yan Yean, near Whittlesea, Victoria, Australia. Completed in 1857 for the supply of potable water, it is the oldest water supply for Melbourne, located 30 kilometres (19 mi) to the south, and, upon completion, was the largest artificial reservoir in the world.

The reservoir and dam are managed by Melbourne Water. The name Yan Yean refers to an Aboriginal leader who signed the Batman's Treaty in 1835 with the name "Yan Yan" ("young male").

== Dam and reservoir overview ==
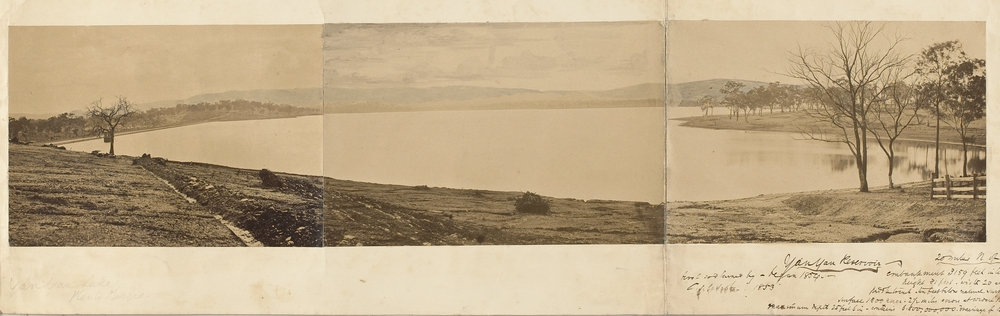
Photograph, lightly coloured, of the reservoir, 1859

=== Dam history ===
Work on the dam commenced on 20 December 1853 when Governor Charles La Trobe turned the first sod. Construction took place at the height of the gold rush employing a tent city of 1,000 workers returning from the goldfields. The Board of Commissionaires of Sewers and Water Supply was formed that same year in response to the demand for a reliable water supply system.

The dam took four years to construct at a cost of A£750,000. Other sources estimated the cost of the project to be A£1,017,087. Most of the pipes were imported from London. It was designed by James Blackburn, an English civil engineer and former London sanitary inspector who was transported to Tasmania as a convict following charges of embezzlement. After being pardoned he came to Melbourne in 1849.

The water was originally supplied by the Plenty River; however, the water quality was poor due to stock crossings and pollution from rural towns. The problem was solved by bypassing the Plenty River and diverting water from Wallaby Creek and Silver Creek, both originating in the Great Dividing Range feeding the Goulburn River. This mountain water was captured in the Toorourrong Reservoir system, constructed in 1883–1885, and supplies water to Yan Yean via an aqueduct to this day. During its construction, the nearby neighbourhood Mernda was created and grew rapidly. Morang became South Yan Yean, and later Mernda.

At the time of its completion in 1857, it was the largest artificial reservoir in the world. Photographer Fred Kruger was commissioned by the government to provide images of the extensive works for display at the Colonial and Indian Exhibition of 1886. By 1857, the city of Melbourne had grown to a population of 100,000. The reservoir was inaugurated in the city in 1857 on New Year's Eve.

=== Technical description of the dam ===
The earth-filled dam wall is 10 metres (33 ft) high and 963 metres (3,159 ft) long. When full, the resultant reservoir has a storage capacity of 33,085 megalitres (26,822 acre⋅ft) and covers 560 hectares (1,400 acres), drawn from a catchment area of 23 square kilometres (8.9 sq mi). The uncontrolled spillway has a discharge capacity of 12 cubic metres per second (420 cu ft/s). Remedial works to the embankment were completed in 2000.

=== Reservoir ===
The reservoir is sited at an elevation of 183 metres (600 ft) AHD, that allows sufficient hydraulic head for the water to be piped throughout the city under gravity.

The region was frequently hit by floods. The reservoir resisted a flood that hit Melbourne in 1923, and became the city's main water emergency resource after the incident. In 1871–72, an arid season led to low water levels in the reservoir and a failure to distribute water throughout the city. During the Second World War, the catchment area was closed for security reasons.

The adjacent Yan Yean Reservoir Park, administered by Parks Victoria, has picnic areas, barbecue facilities, walking tracks and views of the reservoir and surrounding mountains. Wombats, sea eagles, hawks, ducks and deer inhabit the area.

The wetlands are used by birdwatchers. Species sighted include musk duck, Australasian grebe, great crested grebe, white-faced heron, dusky moorhen, Eurasian coot, Latham's snipe, musk lorikeet, eastern rosella, superb fairywren, red wattlebird, grey butcherbird and grey fantail.

== See also ==
- List of reservoirs and dams in Victoria
- Yan Yean Water Supply System
