= Mount Evelyn Aqueduct =

Coordinates: 37°47′3″S 145°22′19″E

Mt Evelyn Aqueduct was a former feature of the Melbourne water supply infrastructure that was built by the Melbourne and Metropolitan Board of Works The O'Shannassy Water Supply (designs prepared 1910-1911). Where the aqueduct crossed the lower lying areas around Wandin and approaching Mount Evelyn, it was in steel or wood-stave piping, converting to open concrete-lined channel when the higher levels were reached. It went through the township of Mount Evelyn in open channel (except for a short distance adjacent to the railway line) winding around the local contours to just above what is now Johns Crescent, then part of the 'Pine Mont Estate.'

From this point, the aqueduct was again transferred to steel pipes to go under the Olinda Creek and Swansea Road to feed the Olinda Reservoir, in the Edinburgh Road area. This reservoir, now roofed over, was open to the skies.

The pipes crossing the Olinda Creek valley cut across the Lilydale Water Race, so water was fed from the Aqueduct to the Race, the pipe creating the Race at the Cascades was cut away, and the section of the Race upstream fell into disuse. The part of the Race downstream to the small reservoir on Birmingham Road was lined with concrete.

Mount Evelyn residents adjacent to the open channel were permitted to syphon water out of the channel for their own use. Those on the high side of the channel were only allowed to pump water where there was no possibility of drainage back into the open channel. One was the Pine Mont Guest House, where a windmill pumped water up to the house on top of a small hill, and the drainage went down the other side. This first aqueduct system, before later enlargement, had a capacity of 20,000,000 gallons (75 megalitres) per day.

In 1917, following a severe drought, a site in Silvan was selected across the Stoneyford Creek (a tributary of Olinda Creek) for extra water storage for Melbourne. The four components of the 'Silvan Dam' were completed by 1933, and comprised:

- The Silvan Reservoir (a major dam across Stoneyford Creek adjacent to Stoneyford Road and two small dams adjacent to McCarthy Road and adjacent to Monbulk Road) with a storage capacity of 40,000 megalitres, completed in 1932. An aerial ropeway was constructed from a special siding at Mount Evelyn railway station to the southwest end of the reservoir wall site, a distance of about 5 kilometres, to convey the sand and cement in 100 buckets needed for the wall construction. The railway siding was at the back of what is now Bowen's timber yard.
- The Diversion Aqueduct, mainly open channel leading from the original O'Shannassy aqueduct near the Wandin Yallock Primary School to a tunnel under Silvan township, to feed water into the newly constructed Reservoir.
- The Outlet Aqueduct from the Silvan Reservoir to feed water back into the existing system. Mainly open channel, becoming a concrete tunnel under Monbulk Road, surfacing near Ormeau Road and the (now) Melba Centre, there joining into the original Aqueduct.
- An increase in capacity of the existing system downstream of the point of entry from Silvan Dam. Flow of water was maintained during the widening by using temporary pipeline which was mostly above ground and took short cuts instead of following surface contours. Generally, one side and the floor of the original concrete channel were removed, the channel was deepened and widened and then re-concreted. Where the original aqueduct was in pipe, an extra pipe was laid.

The health concerns accompanying increases in population caused the open channels to be replaced by pipes to and from the Silvan Reservoir by the late 1960s. Enclosed pipes had no need to follow surface contours, and new shorter routes were adopted.
