= Mount Evelyn Aqueduct Walk =

Coordinates: 37°47′3″S 145°22′19″E

The Mount Evelyn Aqueduct Walk uses part of the Mount Evelyn Aqueduct which once cut the town of Mount Evelyn, Victoria, Australia, in two. The Aqueduct was decommissioned on 7 February 1972, but the high costs of purchase and filling caused Lillydale Council to repeatedly defer negotiations to purchase the land from the Melbourne and Metropolitan Board of Works (MMBW).

== History ==
In 1974–75, the Shire of Lillydale offered to buy land for a central park in Mount Evelyn for a low price ($10,000) on the grounds that the people of Mount Evelyn had been disadvantaged in the past by the aqueduct splitting the town and residents being unable to connect to the water supply, but the Board was unresponsive. In 1974, the Board sold a portion of the land at the junction of the old O'Shannassy Aqueduct and the Silvan Outlet channel for the Melba Centre, but the $120,000 price set for the whole Aqueduct was too high for Council.

In May 1979, a series of chance encounters alerted David and Jean Edwards to the possibility that the aqueduct land might be sold off for development or to adjacent landowners. The Property Officer of the Board of Works confirmed that offers had been invited from adjoining landowners in the "rural" section (from Hazel Street to Hunter Road), with replies due 10–16 July. Enquiries to the Lillydale Council indicated that the Board had applied for re-zoning, but response from the Shire was extremely guarded.

A stay of action was sought after volunteers took a hurriedly framed petition to the Shopping Centre and schools, and presented 230 signatures to A. R. Patterson, the Board member representing eastern municipalities. At the Board meeting, immediate sales proposals were stalled, but the real work of raising the level of awareness of the aqueduct land as potential linear parkland had only begun. Many newcomers to Mount Evelyn were unaware that the aqueduct existed.

== Protection association ==
The Mount Evelyn Environment Protection and Progress Association (MEEPPA) held a Public Meeting at Morrison House chaired by John Muys. Those residents from the Hazel Street/Priestly Crescent section were reassured that their properties (bisected by pipeline) would not be included in the Aqueduct Park.

Meanwhile, East Riding resident and MEEPPA Vice-President Neil Pope was elected to the Lillydale Shire Council, giving the aqueduct park a voice inside Council, and a petition was presented to the Legislative Assembly with 1500 signatures asking for a full-scale investigation of the proposal for a linear park.

During 1979–80, the Board of Works continued breaking up the concrete lining of the channel and filling with clay dug to install the sewer in Mount Evelyn. Only the section beyond Nekla Street still possesses the original open channel. In early 1980 the Council recommended subdividing or transferring to adjacent landowners most of the aqueduct reserve. From Wedderburn Crescent to York Road was to be retained by Council as "linear reserve", that opposite the Clegg Road intersection was proposed for "an institutional purpose or transferred to Council as a public reserve or site for municipal development" and the section south of Priestley Crescent was to be public open space, but not by managed by Council.

MEEPPA members, especially Vin Mishkinis and Jan Simmons, doorknocked homes in all streets close to the aqueduct, informing people of the threat, and inviting them to join the "Friends of the Aqueduct Park". Of the 359 who joined, 222 lived in Mount Evelyn and 128 offered to attend working bees.

In addition to copies of the 359 "Friends" forms, 37 submissions, plus 19 signatures on joint letters or petitions, were made to the Council. Approximately 5 of these supported private use of the land. The remainder supported retaining the aqueduct as a linear park. The decision in open Council, moved by Graham Colling, to purchase three kilometres "in principle", satisfied nobody.

The Melbourne and Metropolitan Board of Works (MMBW) then announced that their price was $261,000. Lillydale Shire, divided into four ridings with the aqueduct in East Riding, had East Riding Councillors Colling and Gersch in favour of selling the land. State politics came into play with the 1982 state election. Neil Pope and Bill Borthwick, opposing candidates, both supported the linear park proposal. Pope, now the member for Monbulk, Victoria, addressed Parliament in May 1982. Considerable efforts were made to resolve the ownership, financial and management issues. In 1983–84, Lillydale Shire Council built the Joy Avenue kindergarten on aqueduct land which it did not own.

Largely through the efforts of Pope, negotiations on a price of $80,000 between the Shire and the MMBW began in 1984. By 1989 the issue of sale was "clarified by the restriction that the majority of the land had to be purchased as a whole by a public authority, and not sold off privately".

== Partnership ==
The Friends of the Mount Evelyn Aqueduct works in partnership with the Shire to fulfill the details of the Management Plan prepared in 1991 by Green and Dale.

Information from Tracks to Trails, a history of Mt Evelyn, by Newton, Herlihy and Leadbeater Phillips, described on the MEEPPA website.

The maps for the Olinda Creek Walking Track and the Silvan Reservoir Park show the Hunter Road, Mt Evelyn Forest end of the Mount Evelyn Aqueduct Walk.
