= 1996–97 Australian bushfire season =

- Date: October 1996 – January 1997
- Location: Australia

Impacts
- Deaths: 3
- Injuries: 40
- Structures destroyed: 44+

A series of bushfires in Australia occurred over the summer of 1996–1997. The most prominent fires during the season were in the Dandenong Ranges and the Mornington Peninsula in the state of Victoria.

== Fires of note ==
State	Start date	Deaths	Injuries	Houses lost	Area (ha)	Local govt.	Impacted communities & destruction	Duration	Ref.
Western Australia	8 January 1997			16	10,500 ha (26,000 acres)	Mundaring	Wooroloo & Wundowie: Wooroloo Prison Farm and dozens of non-residential structures destroyed		
Victoria	19 January 1997			2		Mornington Peninsula	Mount Eliza: 2 carports and a car destroyed	3 days	
Victoria	21 January 1997	3	20	41	3,700 ha (9,100 acres)	Yarra Ranges	Ferny Creek, Kalorama, Mount Dandenong & Upwey: Three civilians perish; 45 houses damaged; A CFA fire truck destroyed	2 days	

== Timeline ==
=== October 1996 ===
In October 1996, one house was destroyed in a bushfire near Ravensbourne in southeast Queensland.

=== January 1997 ===
From 19 to 21 January 1997, fires burnt over 400 hectares (about 990 acres) through much of the Dandenong Ranges and the Mornington Peninsula, precipitated by over forty-degree Celsius dry heat and strong northerly winds. Three people were killed and forty injured. Forty-three houses were destroyed and another 45 damaged. Fires began at all locations except the Dandenongs on the 19th; the Dandenongs fires began on the morning of the 21st in the foothills of the western face of the ranges. It was suspected that the fires in the Dandenongs were deliberately lit.

The areas most affected by these fires included:

- Creswick
- Dandenong Ranges
- Ferny Creek – 3 deaths
- Kalorama
- Mount Dandenong
- Upwey
- Dutson Downs
- Gippsland
- Heathcote
- Mornington Peninsula
- Arthurs Seat
- Mount Eliza
- Mount Martha
