= Mount Evelyn, Victoria =

Mount Evelyn
- Suburb
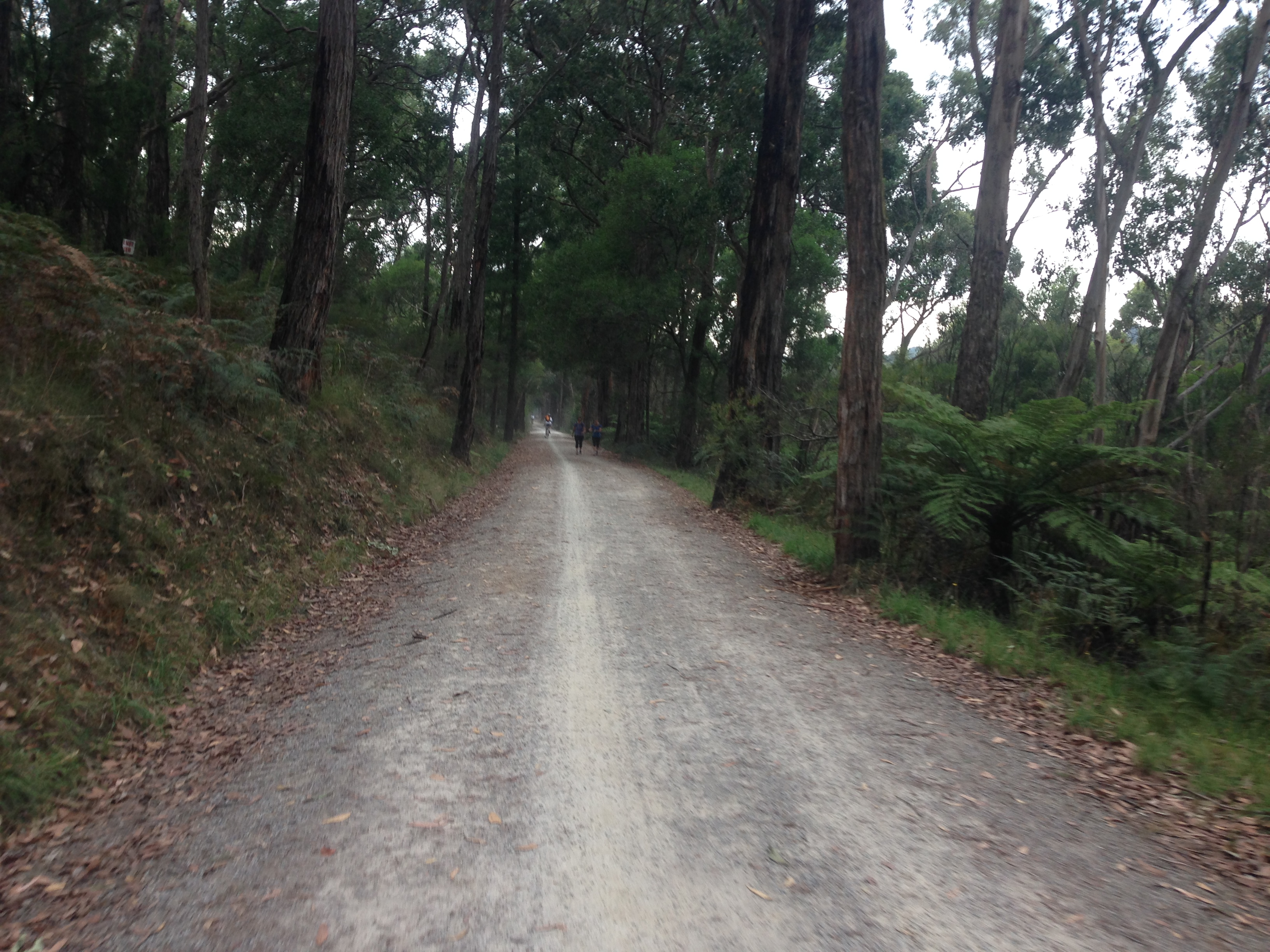
- Lilydale to Warburton Rail Trail, Mount Evelyn

- Interactive map of Mount Evelyn
- Coordinates: 37.783°S 145.385°E
- Country: Australia
- State: Victoria
- City: Melbourne
- LGA: Shire of Yarra Ranges
- Location: 41 km (25 mi) from Melbourne; 5 km (3.1 mi) from Lilydale; 19 km (12 mi) from Belgrave

Government
  - State electorates: Evelyn; Monbulk
  - Federal division: Casey
- Elevation: 188 m (617 ft)

Population
  - Total: 9,799 (2021 census)
- Postcode: 3796
Suburbs around Mount Evelyn
Lilydale	Lilydale	Wandin North
Lilydale	Mount Evelyn	Wandin North
Montrose	Kalorama	Silvan

Mount Evelyn is a suburb in Melbourne, Victoria, Australia, 37 km east of Melbourne's central business district, located within the Shire of Yarra Ranges local government area. Mount Evelyn recorded a population of 9,799 at the 2021 census.

== History ==
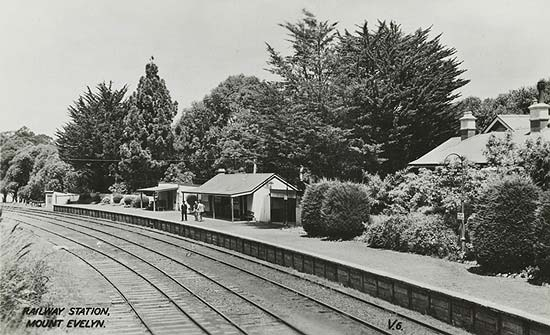
Mount Evelyn railway station mid-1940s. Incorrectly labelled 1920 when reprinted in 1986 to mark the opening of the library

Mount Evelyn nestles in a right-angled bend of the Olinda Creek, a large, permanent creek known originally as Running Creek. Different parts of the current Mount Evelyn area were first known as Olinda Vale, Billygoat Hill, McKillop/Valinda and South Wandin.

The Post Office opened on 15 February 1904 as Valinda (derived from Olinda Vale). The name was changed to Evelyn (the name of the county) in 1908, then to Mount Evelyn in 1913. The town experienced a boom in the early 1930s due to the construction of the nearby Silvan Dam and Mount Evelyn Aqueduct, but was greatly affected by the depression of the same period once this project was completed in 1932.

The railway line was closed in 1965, just before the area experienced rapid population growth in the 1970s and 1980s. Together with the nearby settlements of Belgrave, Monbulk and other towns, the region developed a tourism industry that persists to this day. The town's reserves were also incorporated into the larger Dandenong Ranges National Park in the southern part of the suburb.

=== Etymology ===
The (now closed) railway station, opened in 1901, was originally named 'Olinda Vale'. This was changed to 'Evelyn' after the county in which it is centrally placed, possibly as part of an attempt by the Victorian Railways to shorten names of stations. In 1919, the local progress association persuaded the Railways to add the "Mount" to encourage visitors to the healthy mountain area, which is the highest point on the railway (now the Lilydale to Warburton Rail Trail).

Contrary to popular belief, the town was not named for the daughter of the Victorian Governor of the day. The origin of the name 'Evelyn' remains a mystery.

== Education ==
Mount Evelyn has five schools within its boundaries.

- Mount Evelyn Primary School
- St Mary's Catholic Primary School, Mt. Evelyn
- Birmingham Primary School
- Yarra Hills Secondary College Mount Evelyn Campus
- Mount Evelyn Christian School

== Parks and reserves ==
The Warburton Trail, a walking and cycling track, runs through Mount Evelyn. The trail runs between Lilydale and Warburton.

The Mount Evelyn Aqueduct Walk is another trail connecting Swansea Road to Hunter Road and the Mount Evelyn Forest (part of the Dandenong Ranges National Park).

== Sport ==
The town has an Australian Rules football team competing in the Outer East Football Netball League at Gary Martin Oval. The club was founded in 1931 as the Mount Evelyn Rovers.
