= Dandenong Ranges =

Mountain range in Victoria, Australia

- Corhanwarrabul, the Dandenongs
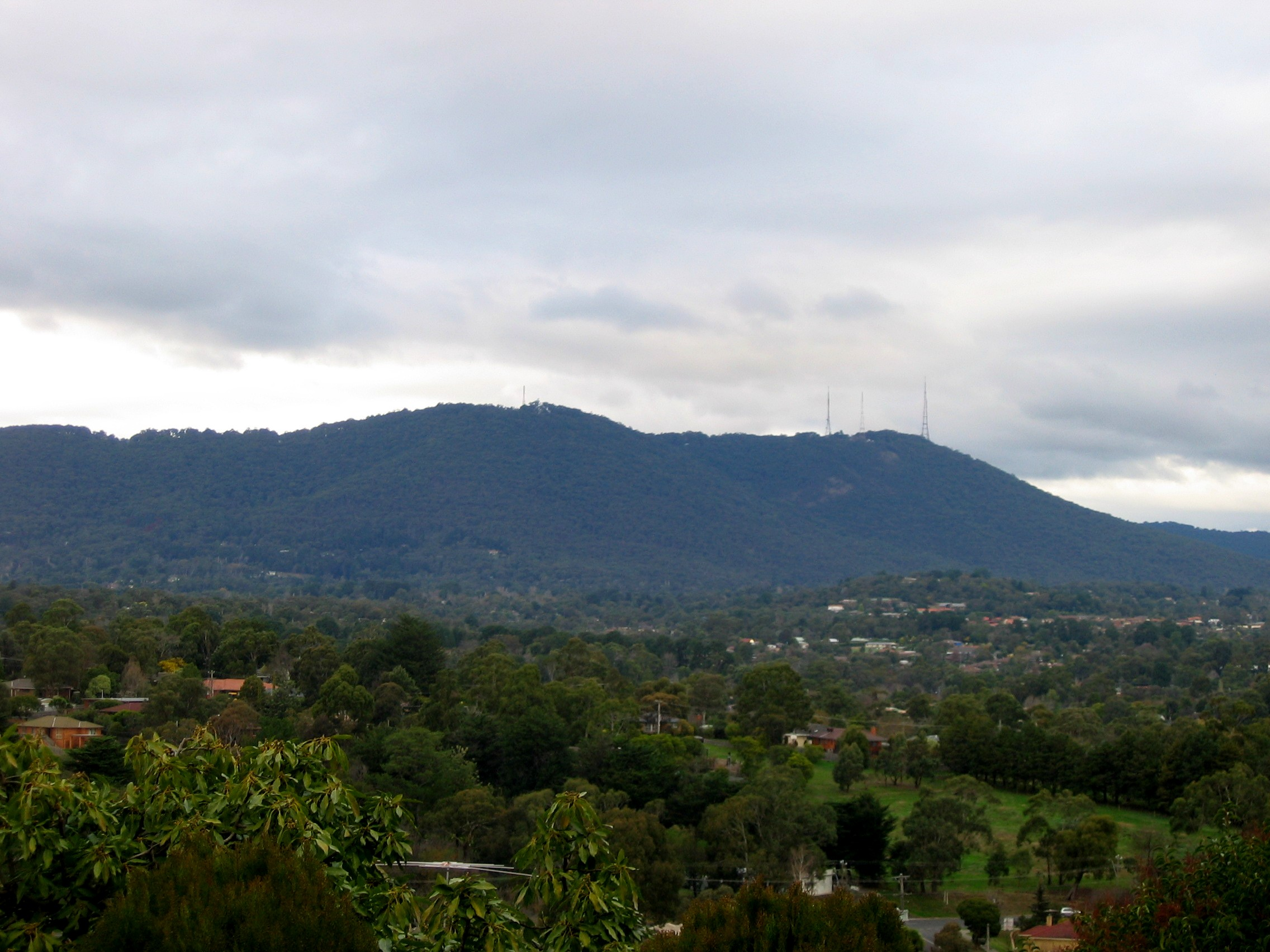
- Left - Mount Dandenong and right - Mount Corhanwarrabul, viewed from Mooroolbark

Highest point
- Peak: Mount Dandenong
- Elevation: 633 m (2,077 ft)
- Coordinates: 37°49′38″S 145°21′10″E

Dimensions
- Length: 50 km (31 mi) N-S
- Width: 10 km (6.2 mi) E-W

Geography
- Location within Victoria
- Country: Australia
- State: Victoria
- Range coordinates: 37°50′08″S 145°21′33″E
- Parent range: Great Dividing Range

Geology
- Rock age: Devonian
- Rock types: Igneous; Sedimentary; Metamorphic

The Dandenong Ranges (commonly just the Dandenongs) are a set of low mountain ranges in Victoria, Australia, approximately 35 km (22 mi) east of the state capital Melbourne. A minor branch of the Great Dividing Range, the Dandenongs consist mostly of rolling hills, rising to 633 m (2,077 ft) at Mount Dandenong, as well as steeply weathered valleys and gullies covered in thick temperate rainforest, predominantly of tall mountain ash trees and dense ferny undergrowth. The namesake Dandenong Creek and most of its left-bank tributaries (particularly the Eumemmerring Creek) originate from headwaters in these mountain ranges. Two of Melbourne's most important storage reservoirs, the Cardinia and Silvan Reservoir, are also located within the Dandenongs.

After European settlement in the Port Phillip Bay region, the range was used as a major local source of timber for Melbourne. The ranges were popular with day-trippers from the 1870s onwards. Much of the Dandenongs were protected as parklands as early as 1882, and by 1987 these parklands were amalgamated to form the Dandenong Ranges National Park, which was subsequently expanded in 1997. The range receives light to moderate snowfalls a few times in most years, frequently between late winter and late spring.

Today, the Dandenongs are home to over 100,000 residents and are popular amongst visitors, many of whom stay for the weekend at the various bed & breakfasts throughout the region. The popular Puffing Billy Railway, a heritage steam railway, runs through the hills villages of the eastern Dandenong Ranges.

== Geology and ecology ==
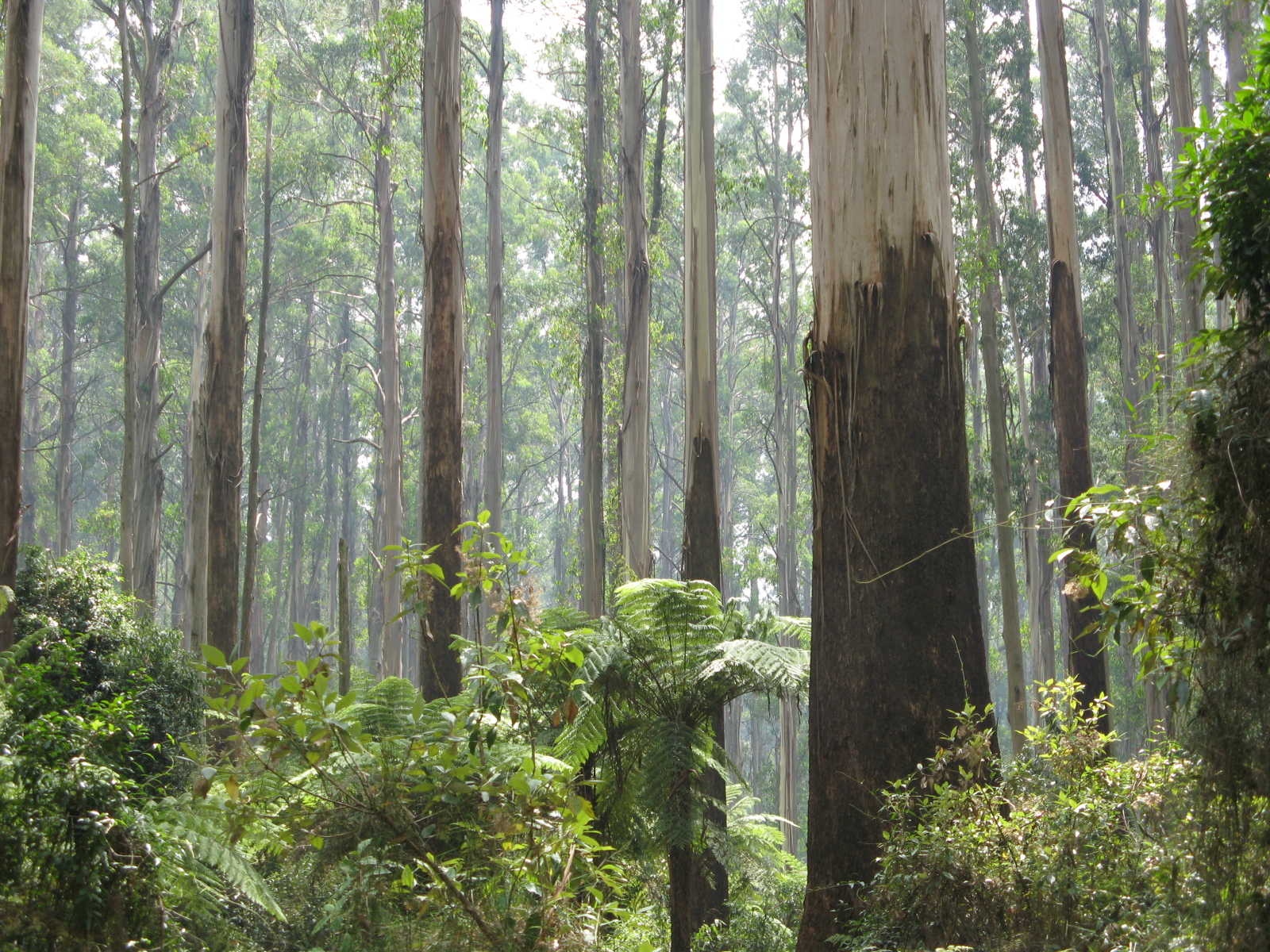
Sherbrooke Forest

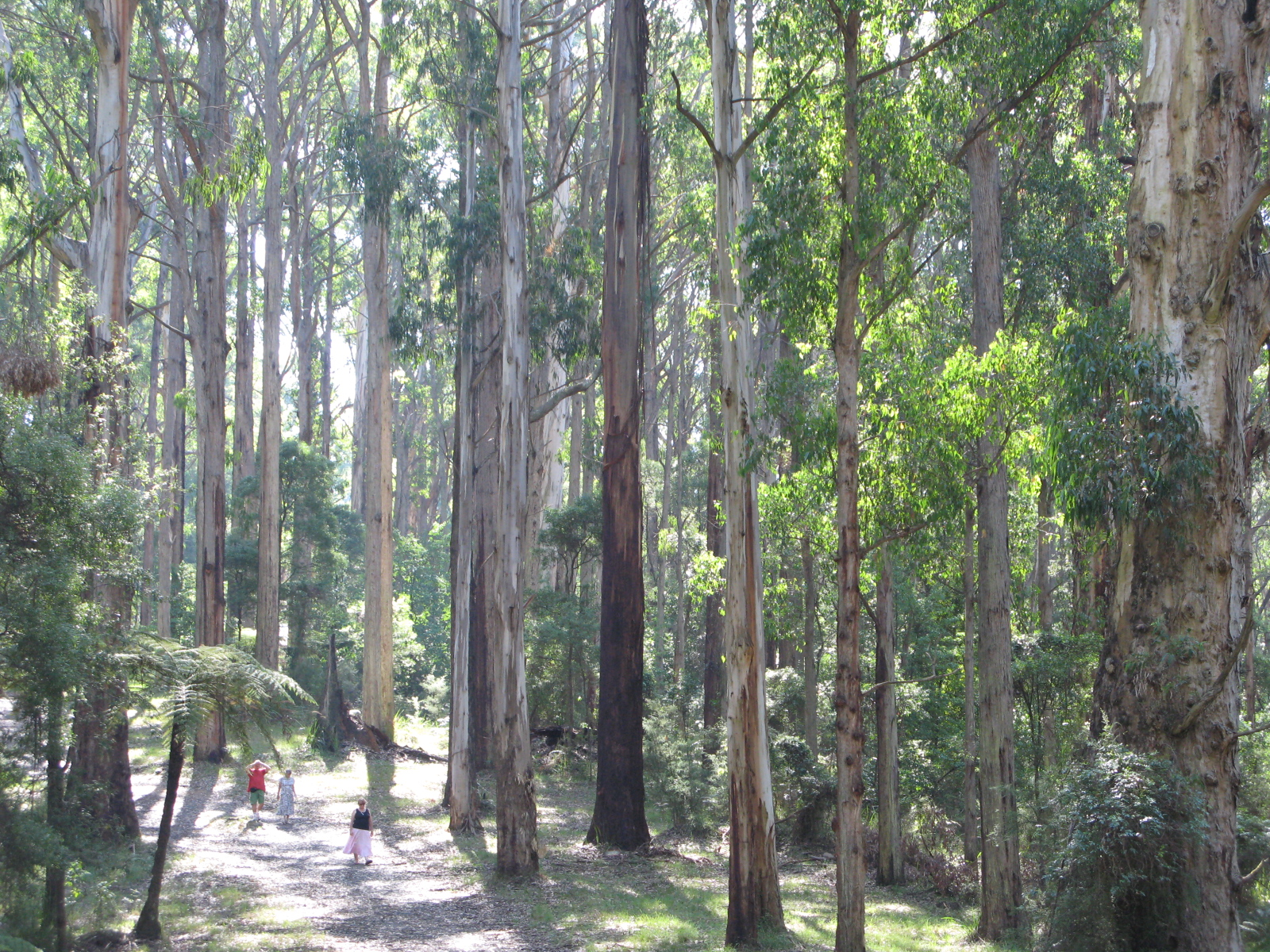
Olinda Forest, west of Olinda Falls

The range is the remains of an extinct volcano last active 373 million years ago. It consists predominantly of Devonian dacite and rhyodacite.

The topography consists of a series of ridges dissected by deeply cut streams. Sheltered gullies in the south of the range are home to temperate rain forest, fern gullies and mountain ash forest Eucalyptus regnans, whereas the drier ridges and exposed northern slopes are covered by dry sclerophyll forest of stringybarks and box. The entire range is highly prone to bushfires, the most recent of which have been the 1983 Ash Wednesday bushfires, the 1997 Dandenong Ranges bushfires and small fires during the Black Saturday bushfires in 2009.

A number of watercourses originate in the Dandenongs, these include:

- Cardinia Creek
- Clematis Creek
- Dandenong Creek
- Eumemmerring Creek
- Emerald Creek
- Ferny Creek
- Mast Gully Creek
- Menzies Creek
- Monbulk Creek
- Muddy Creek
- Olinda Creek
- Sassafras Creek
- Sherbrooke Creek
- Stringy Bark Creek
- Wandin Yallock Creek
- Woori Yallock Creek

=== Waterfalls ===
- Olinda Falls
- Sherbrooke Falls
- Griffith Falls

=== Summits ===
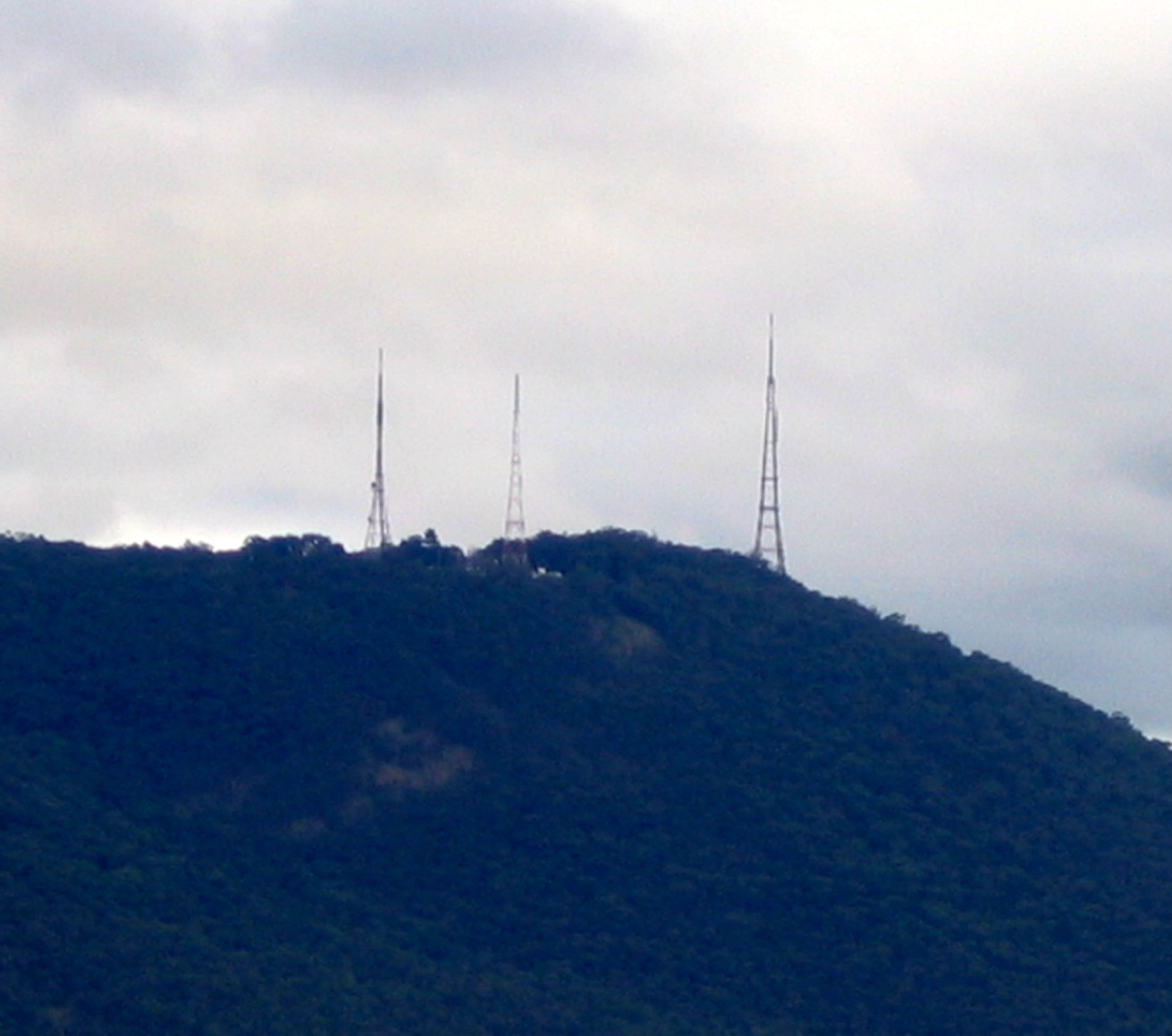
Mount Corhanwarrabul summit, 2005

Sortable table
Summit Name	Height (m)	Comments	Location	Source (Note: Survey mark and counter data has been accessed from the State of Victoria Land and Survey Spatial Information)
Mount Dandenong	630	Tallest peak of the Dandenongs	Observatory Road, Mt Dandenong	DANDENONG ECC J survey mark
Mount Corhanwarrabul	612	Burkes lookout and location of transmission towers	Burkes Lookout Reserve, Eyre Road, Mt Dandenong	contour data
Olinda summit	592	No official name. Labelled Mt Olinda in older tourist maps.	Range Road, Olinda	contour data
Sassafras peak	538	No recorded name.	Cooloongatta Road, Sassafras	contour data
Dunns Hill	562	Location of a number of radio and telephone towers.	One Tree Hill Road, Ferny Creek	contour data
One Tree Hill	500		Lord Somers Road, Ferny Creek	contour data
Tremont Hill	395	No official name.	Tremont Hill Track, Tremont	contour data
Chandlers Hill	405		Chandlers Track, Tremont	contour data
Johns Hill	419		Johns Hill Reserve, Ridge Road, Kallista	JOHNS HILL ECC 1986 survey mark
Black Hill	374		Black Hill Reserve, Two Bays Crescent, Selby	contour data
Upwey Hill	278		Belmont Street, Upwey	contour data
Lewis Hill	298		Queens Road, Silvan	contour data
Nobelius Hill	320		Ambrose Street, Emerald	contour data
Mount Morton	275		Chaundy Road, Belgrave South	MORTON ECC A survey mark

== Wildlife ==
The Dandenong Ranges are home to a variety of native Australian mammal, bird, reptile and invertebrate species. Well-represented bird species include the Sulfur-crested cockatoo, Superb lyrebird, Laughing kookaburra, and Crimson Rosella. Mammals include the Short-beaked echidna, Common wombat, Sugar glider, and Swamp wallaby. Invertebrates include two species of burrowing crayfish.

== Climate ==
The Dandenong Ranges' climate is generally cool and wet, with daily temperature variation generally low, often as low as 1 degree in the winter months. Rainfall is fairly uniform through the year, tending to peak between April and October with lower rainfall during January and February. The mean annual rainfall is between 1000 and 1500 mm, increasing with elevation and from west to east. The elevation means that daytime temperatures are typically 4 to 6 °C cooler than the lower suburbs of Melbourne to the west , with temperatures typically lowering by 1 °C for every 120 metres (390 ft) of elevation. Due to the elevation, upslope fog is common in the winter months. It is significantly cloudier than Melbourne, particularly in winter due to heavy orographic lifting brought about by cold fronts.

Snow typically falls a few times a year above 500 metres (1,600 ft), mostly between June and October and can be heavy at times. Heavy snowfalls which were once common have become rare, though lighter snowfalls are still common. The last significant snowfall to affect the Dandenong Ranges was on August 10, 2008, when as much 15 cm (5.9 in) fell to around 600 metres (2,000 ft). An exceptionally rare summer snowfall occurred on Christmas Day 2006 .

A Bureau of Meteorology weather station sits at an elevation of 513 m in the Ferny Creek Reserve in the southern part of the Dandenong Ranges. This weather station replaced one that was previously located on the summit of Dunns Hill.

Climate data for Mount Dandenong GTV9 (1968−1986, rainfall to 2007); 600 m AMSL; 37.83° S, 145.35° E
Month	Jan	Feb	Mar	Apr	May	Jun	Jul	Aug	Sep	Oct	Nov	Dec	Year
Record high °C (°F)	37.3 (99.1)	39.3 (102.7)	33.6 (92.5)	28.0 (82.4)	20.3 (68.5)	15.0 (59.0)	16.0 (60.8)	20.0 (68.0)	22.7 (72.9)	28.7 (83.7)	33.2 (91.8)	36.2 (97.2)	39.3 (102.7)
Mean daily maximum °C (°F)	22.1 (71.8)	22.9 (73.2)	19.7 (67.5)	15.4 (59.7)	11.7 (53.1)	8.8 (47.8)	8.2 (46.8)	9.6 (49.3)	11.6 (52.9)	14.8 (58.6)	17.3 (63.1)	19.9 (67.8)	15.2 (59.3)
Mean daily minimum °C (°F)	11.5 (52.7)	12.6 (54.7)	11.3 (52.3)	9.0 (48.2)	6.9 (44.4)	4.4 (39.9)	3.6 (38.5)	4.2 (39.6)	5.0 (41.0)	6.8 (44.2)	8.3 (46.9)	9.8 (49.6)	7.8 (46.0)
Record low °C (°F)	4.0 (39.2)	4.7 (40.5)	3.7 (38.7)	0.7 (33.3)	−0.4 (31.3)	−1.0 (30.2)	−2.3 (27.9)	−2.0 (28.4)	−1.8 (28.8)	−0.6 (30.9)	0.5 (32.9)	2.3 (36.1)	−2.3 (27.9)
Average precipitation mm (inches)	70.2 (2.76)	61.2 (2.41)	74.6 (2.94)	102.0 (4.02)	129.6 (5.10)	98.4 (3.87)	95.5 (3.76)	116.8 (4.60)	106.0 (4.17)	104.8 (4.13)	109.4 (4.31)	95.7 (3.77)	1,165.9 (45.90)
Average precipitation days	12.1	8.4	12.4	13.7	18.2	17.8	20.0	19.7	17.5	16.5	15.2	12.9	184.4
Mean monthly sunshine hours	232.5	217.5	189.1	150.0	102.3	78.0	83.7	105.4	126.0	170.5	189.0	198.4	1,842.4
Source 1: Mount Dandenong GTV9 (temperatures and rainfall, 1968–2007)
Source 2: Toolangi (Mount St Leonard DPI, sunshine hours 1965–2001)

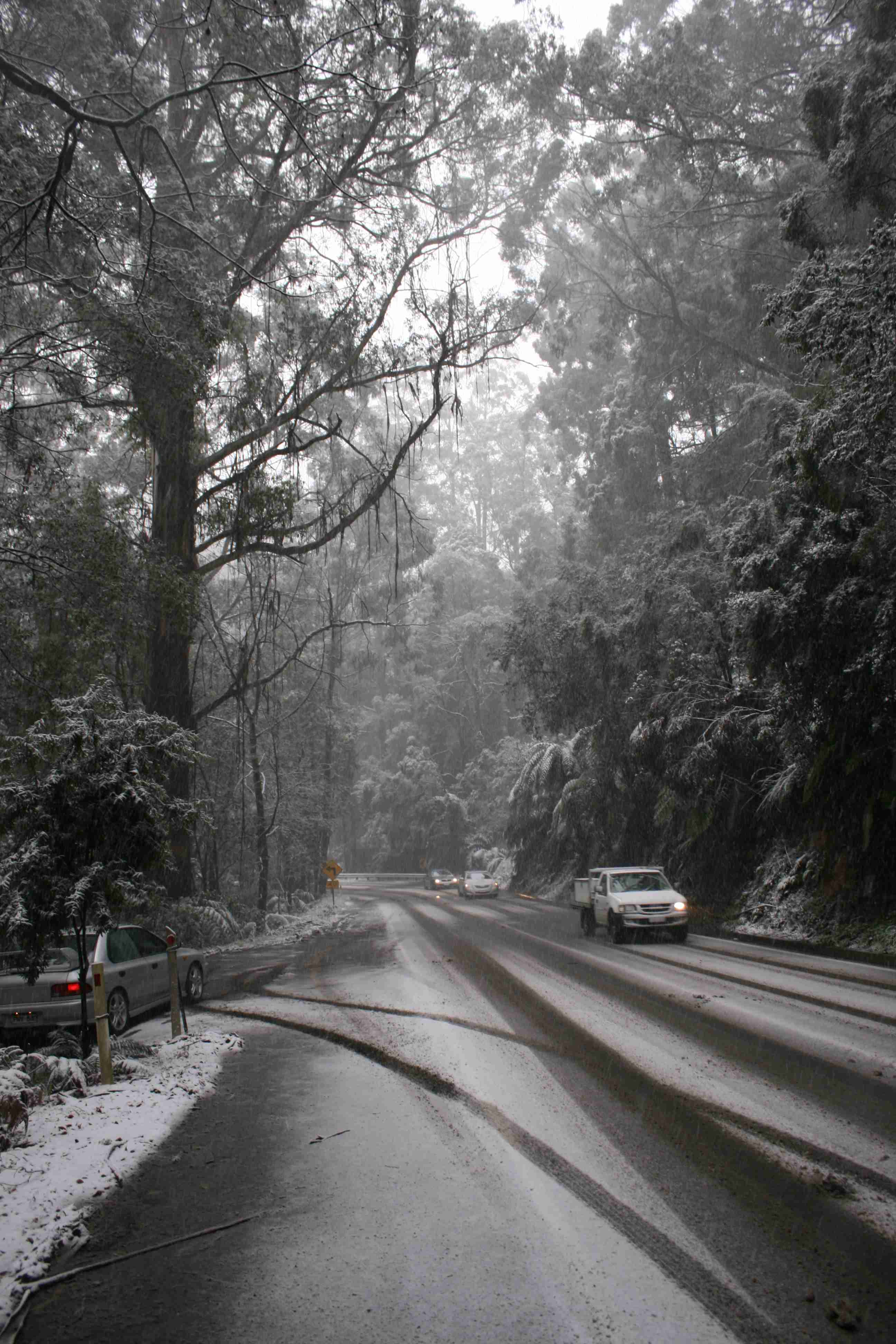
Snow in Sassafras, Victoria, Australia, August 10, 2008

== Settlements in the Dandenong Ranges ==
Around 240,000 people live in and around the Dandenong Ranges, depending on the definition. The following settlements are located in the Dandenongs themselves (72,500~):

- Belgrave—3929
- Belgrave Heights—1,500
- Belgrave South—1,500
- Clematis—350
- Emerald—6,000
- Ferny Creek—1,500
- Ferntree Gully - 10,000
- Kallista—1,000
- Kalorama—1,100
- Kilsyth—10,000
- Menzies Creek—1,300
- Monbulk—2,700
- Montrose—6, 500
- Mount Dandenong—1,300
- Olinda—1,500
- Sassafras—1,000
- Selby—1,400
- Tecoma—2,200
- The Patch—800
- Upper Ferntree Gully—4,000
- Upwey—6,800

Some settlements located on and around the plateau to the east of the ranges are sometimes included (14,200~):

- Cockatoo—4,500
- Gembrook—1,600
- Macclesfield—1,600
- Seville—2,000
- Seville East—600
- Silvan—1,900
- Wandin East—500
- Wandin North—1,600

Settlements in the southern and western foothills are also sometimes included (180,500~):

- Western Foothills
- The Basin—4,100
- Boronia—20,500
- Mount Evelyn—9,100
- Southern Foothills
- Endeavour Hills—24,000
- Narre Warren—26,000
- Berwick—47,000
- Narre Warren North—7,700
- Harkaway—849
- Beaconsfield Upper—2,861

== History ==
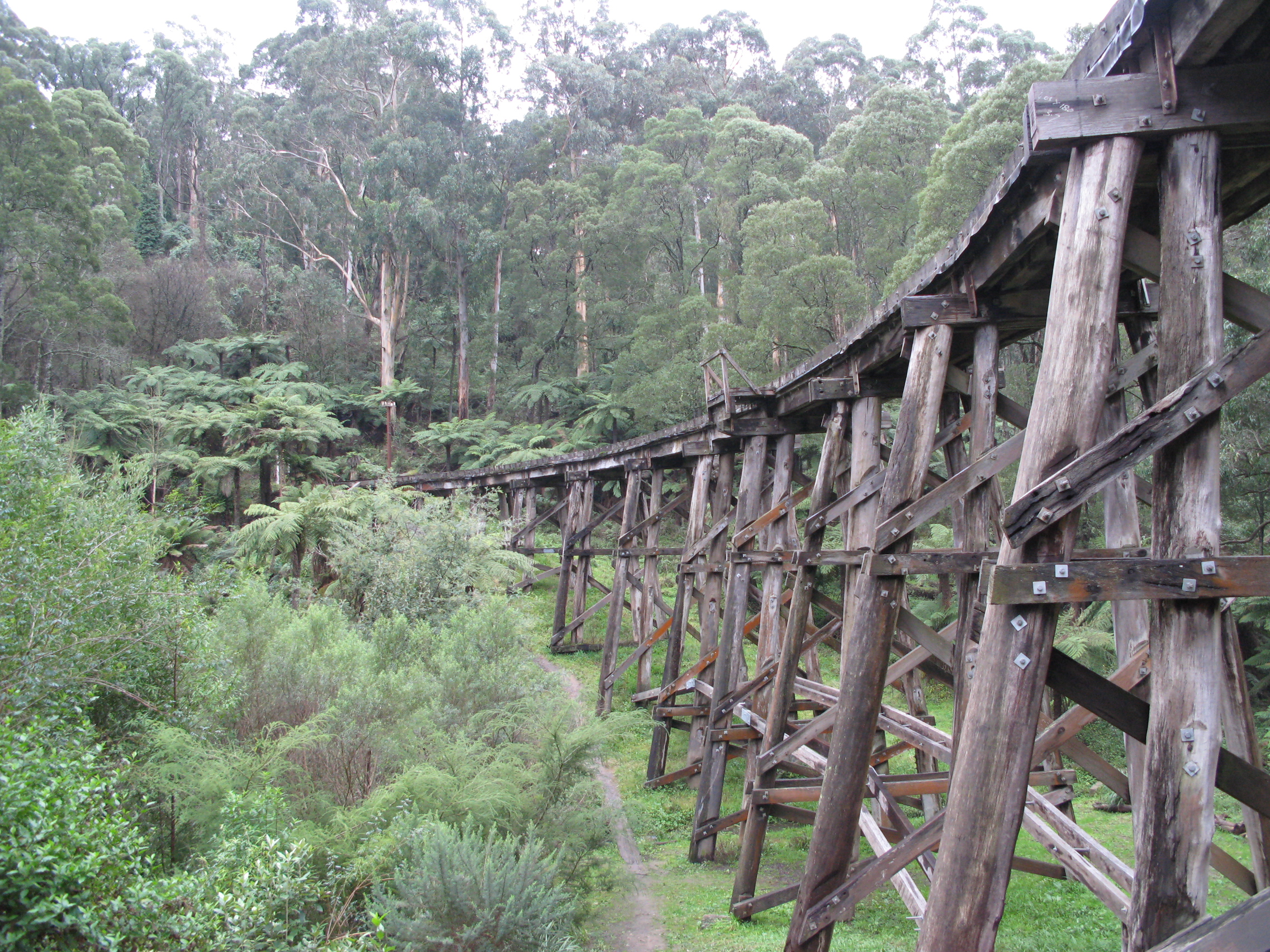
The Monbulk Creek Trestle Bridge, part of the Puffing Billy Railway

The ranges are located near the boundary between the Wurundjeri and Bunurong people's territories. The two nations were part of the Kulin alliance and were most often on friendly terms. The mountain range, however, was not often frequented by either nations people as mountainous areas were often considered one of many resting places for various spirits.

In 1938, the aircraft Kyeema crashed on the western face of Mount Corhanwarrabul due to heavy fog and poor navigation. Eighteen people died.

== Utilities ==
=== Transmission towers ===
There are several large television transmission towers on various summits that were initially constructed to broadcast TV to Central Victoria

- Channel 10/Channel 0, 204m high—Mount Corhanwarrabul (628m), (highest frequency)
- Channel 9, 131m high—Mount Corhanwarrabul (628m)
- Channel 7, 131m high—Mount Corhanwarrabul (628m), this tower is from interesting design, as it is a partially guyed tower, consisting of a free-standing lattice tower as basement and a guyed mast as pinnacle.
- Channel 2—Ferny Creek Summit (561m) (lowest frequency)

Channel 7, 9 and 10 all transmit from the 204M high ' Ornata Road ' TXA owned tower just to the South of Burke's Lookout. This tower also carries some of Melbourne, Victoria's commercial FM broadcast services. It also carries DAB+ digital radio services. Channel 2 services ( ABC, JJJ, emergency services, Govt owned ) transmit from the 130M high Broadcast Australia ' Eyre Road ' tower. This is an interesting tower in that the base is of four legged, freestanding design, while the upper portion is guyed by two sets of three guy cables. This tower is just to the North of Burke's Lookout. Adjacent to the Broadcast Australia tower, is the TXA ' Eyre Road ' standby tower, capable of transmitting 7, 9, and 10 signals in the event of an Ornata Road transmitter/antenna failure. This tower stands at 130M also and is a conventional four legged freestanding design. About 2 km to the North of this group of three towers, stands the original Channel 9 tower, built in 1956 to a height of 69M. This tower, on Observatory Road and adjacent to the Skyhigh lookout and restaurant now carries only some of Melbourne's commercial FM broadcast channels.

== Tourism and attractions ==
- Scenic drives—popular for many years on the abundance of winding roads throughout the ranges
- Picnics—dedicated picnic areas can be found in Fern Tree Gully Picnic Ground or at One Tree Hill or in Sherbrooke Forest. Emerald Lake Park has a variety of pretty picnic spots with electric barbecues, sheltered areas and water activities. This park with landscaped gardens adjoins the historic Nobelius Heritage Park
- The various coffee shops and restaurants, bed and breakfasts, craft shops, antique shops and gardens
- Puffing Billy Railway—a narrow-gauge heritage steam railway, from Belgrave, through to Emerald, Cockatoo and ending at Gembrook
- Lookouts & views—There are several locations throughout the ranges that offer excellent views on both sides of the range. On a clear day, features as far as Mount Macedon, the You Yangs and Port Phillip can be seen simultaneously
- Walking & hiking—various tracks and trails are available at a variety of lengths and difficulties. For example; Four Brothers Rocks near Gembrook, Wright Forest near Cockatoo; The Eastern Dandenong Ranges Trail, which runs through Emerald, Cockatoo to Gembrook has a variety of open scenery and dappled woodland trails and at various stages follows the Puffing Billy railway line

Sherbrooke Falls, Sherbrooke

- Cycling—the Dandenong Ranges is one of Melbourne's most popular cycling areas. Popular road cycling climbs include the "1 in 20" on the Mountain Highway, "The Wall", a steeper route between Monbulk and Olinda, and the also-steep "Devil's Elbow", heading north from Upper Ferntree Gully along the Mount Dandenong Tourist Road to Ferny Creek. Also popular for picturesque and leisurely family bike rides is the Eastern Dandenong Ranges Trail, which runs through Emerald, Cockatoo to Gembrook

=== Regulations ===
Camping is not permitted within the National Park and fire restrictions may apply during the summer months. There are no trash receptacles in the national parks and visitors must leave with all items that they arrived with. Camping is permitted near Gembrook at Kurth Kiln Regional Park. Visitors are encouraged to observe weather conditions and warnings during the bushfire season and to follow official recommendations.

== Bushfires ==
Due to the climate of the region, the type of vegetation and the topography, the Dandenong Ranges periodically experience bushfires. Some of the recent occurrences included:

- 1851—Black Thursday
- 1898
- 1905
- 1913
- 1926
- 1939—Black Friday
- 1962
- 1968
- 1983—Ash Wednesday, 27 deaths in the Dandenong ranges
- 1997—3 deaths in the ranges
- 2009—Black Saturday, no deaths in the ranges

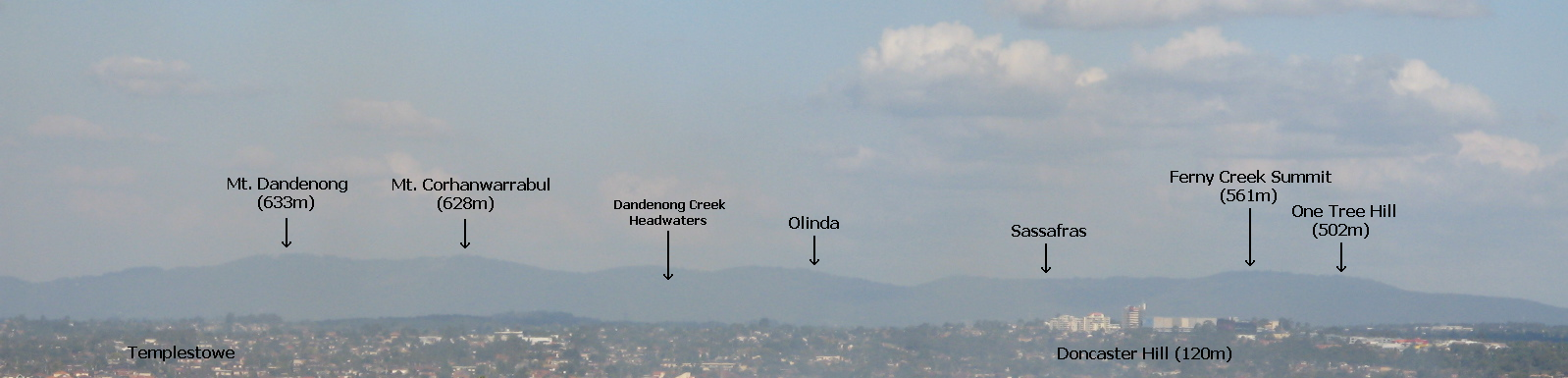
The Dandenong Ranges, viewed from Heidelberg looking east over Doncaster Hill, through smoke haze after the Black Saturday bushfires

== Gallery ==
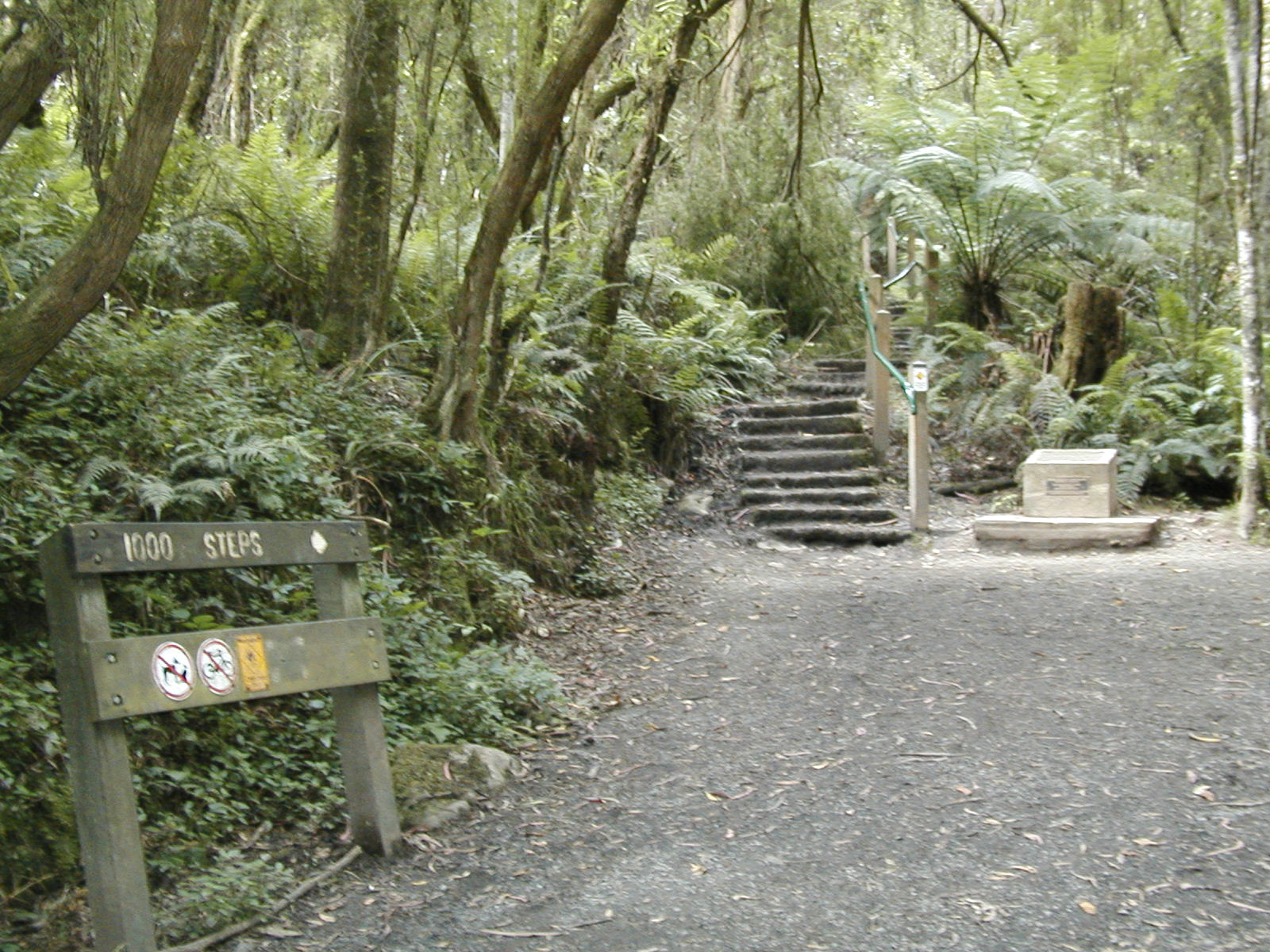
The 1000 steps

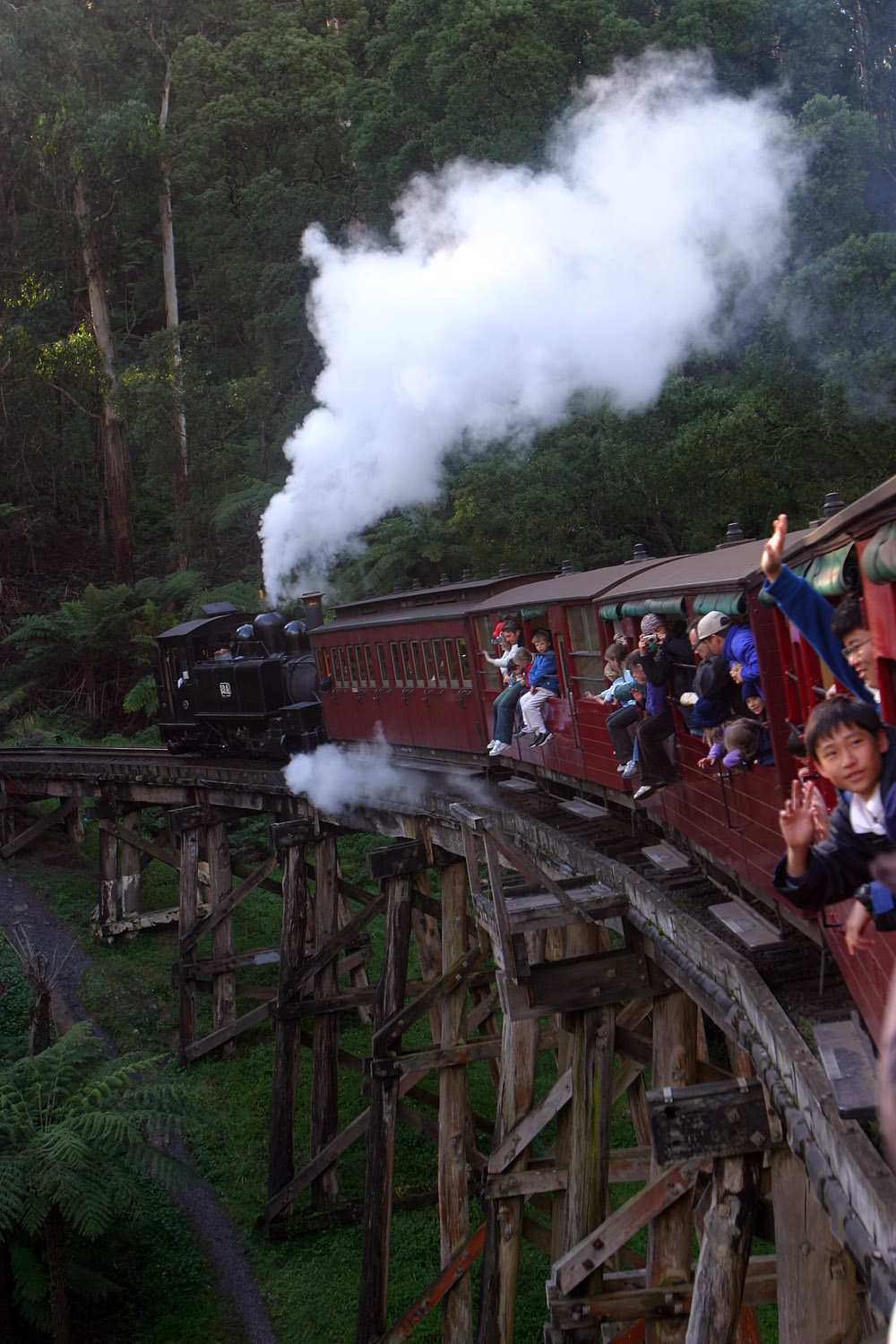
Puffing Billy on the Trestle Bridge

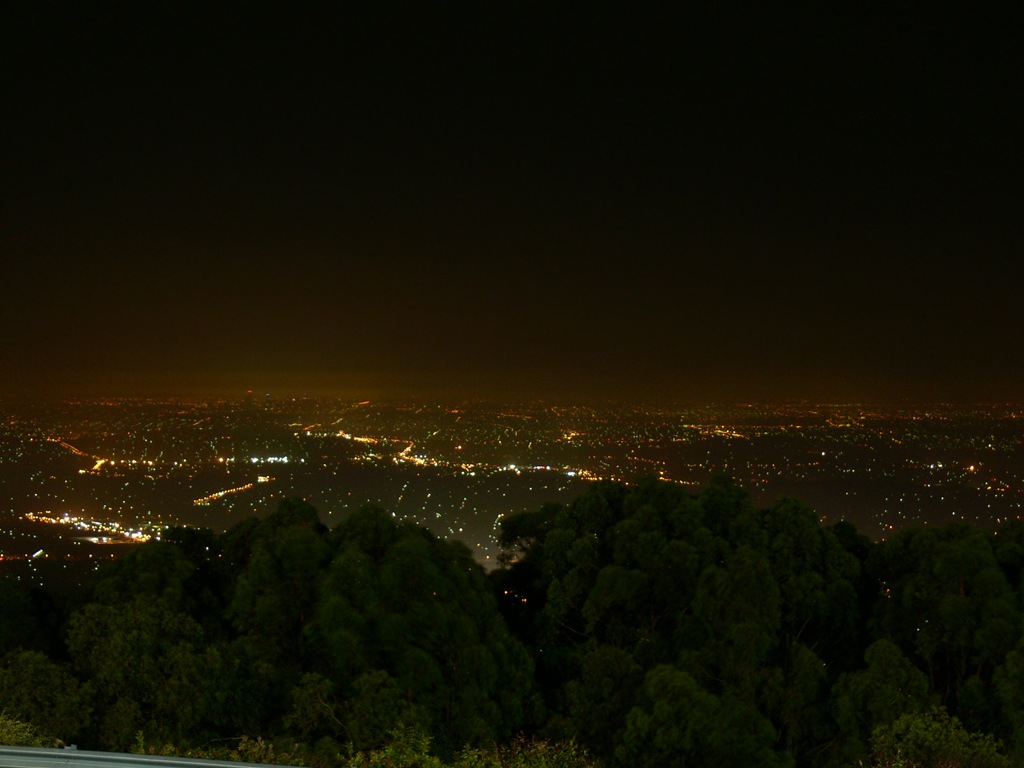
View of Melbourne from the summit of Mount Dandenong

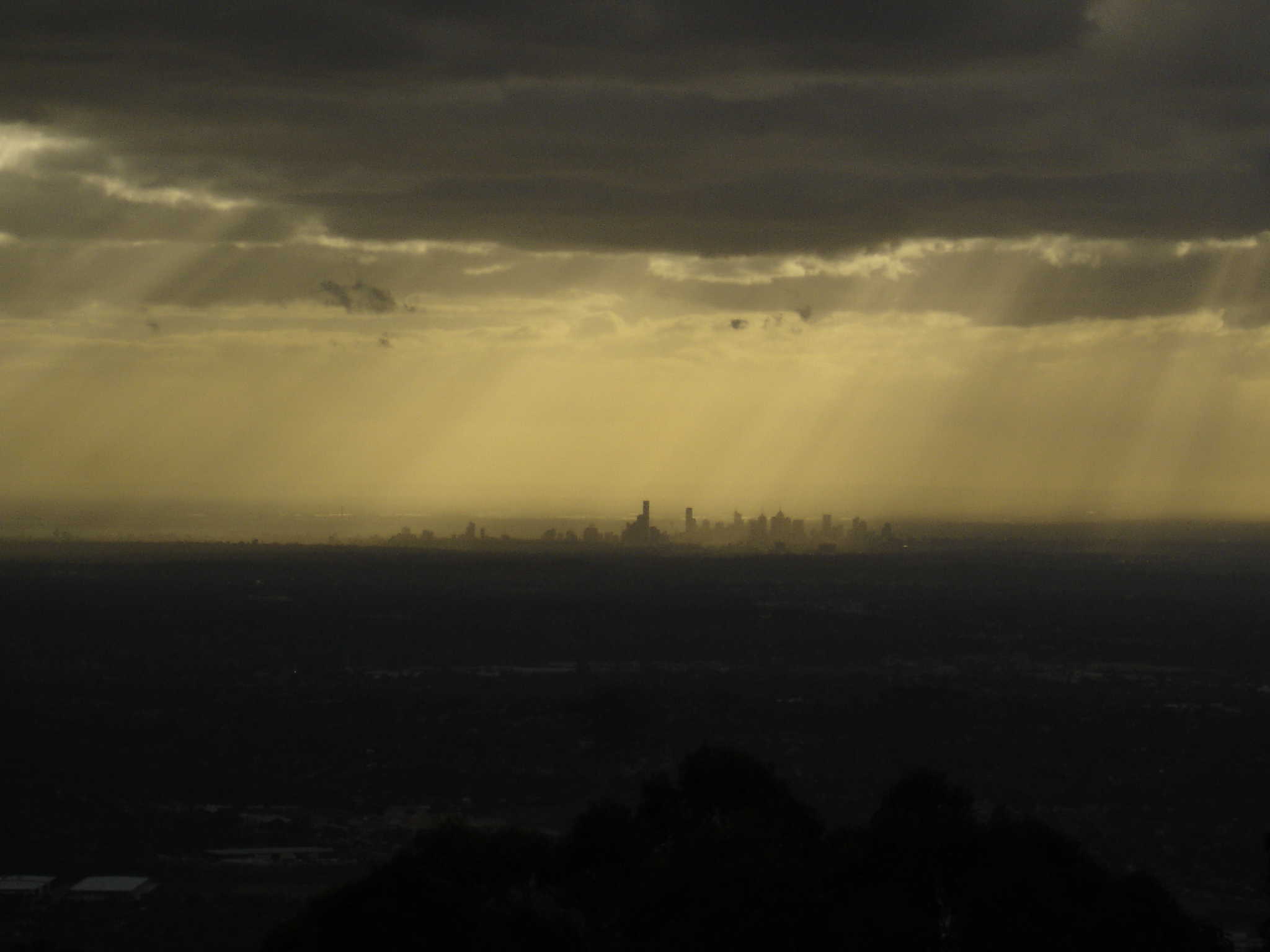
View of Melbourne from the summit of Mount Dandenong

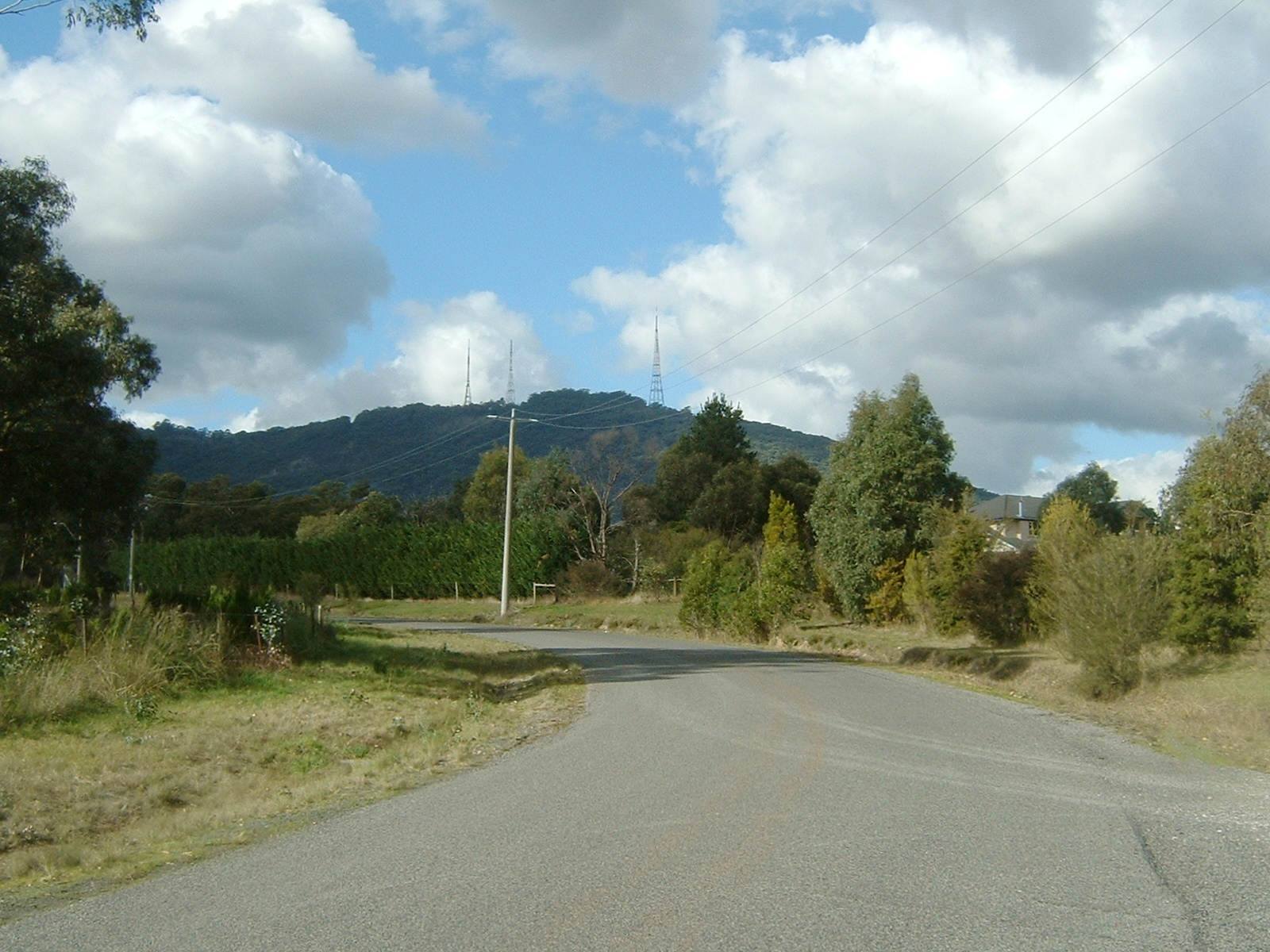
Mount Dandenong as seen from Kilsyth

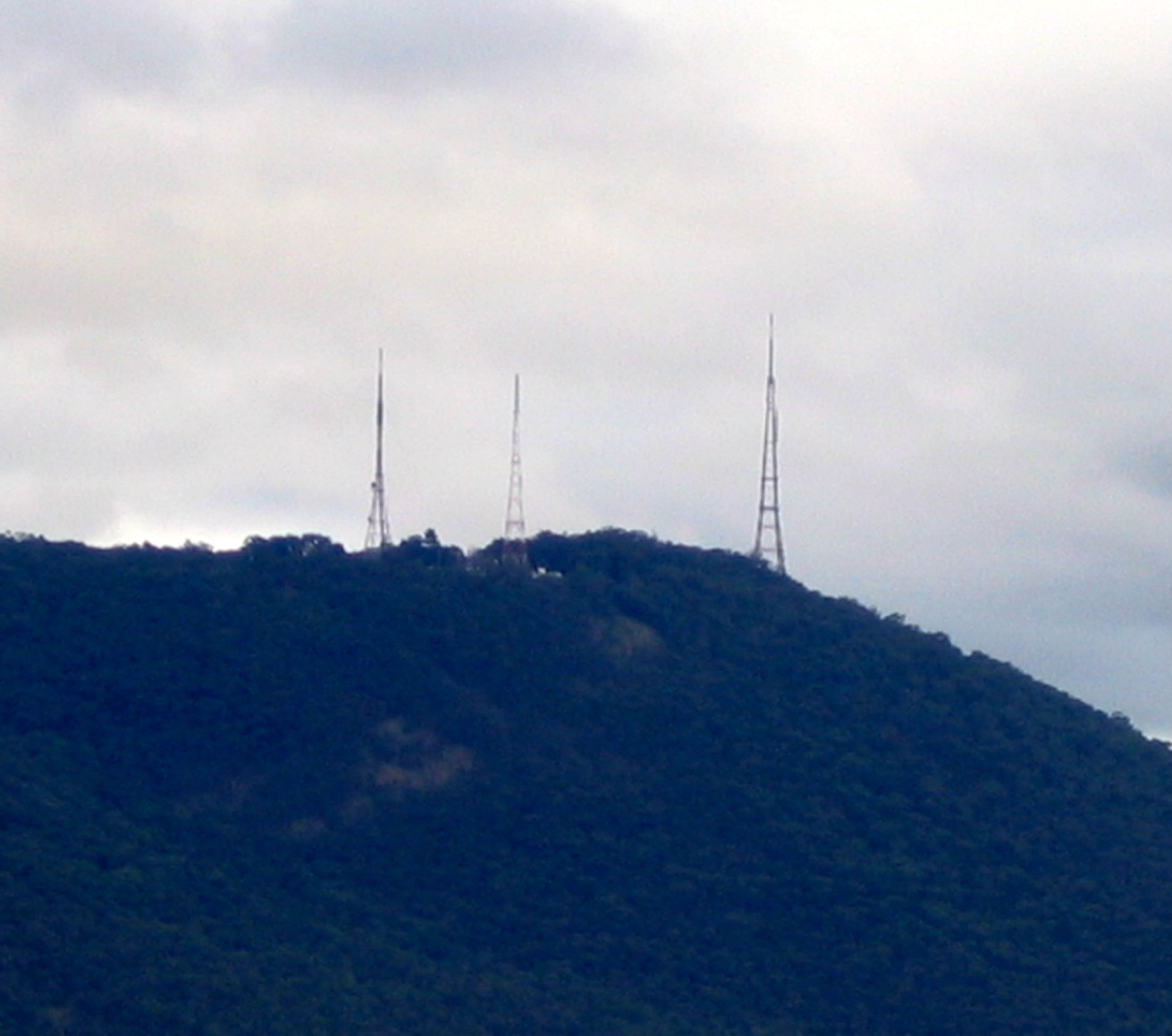
Transmission towers on the summit of Mount Corhanwarrabul

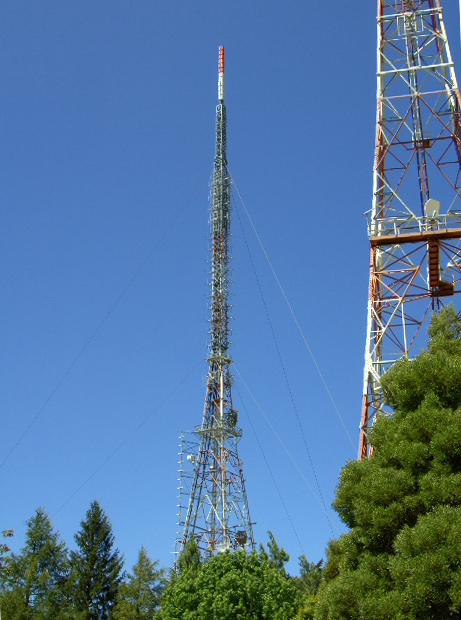
Transmission towers. Note that the upper parts of the tower in the background are guyed.

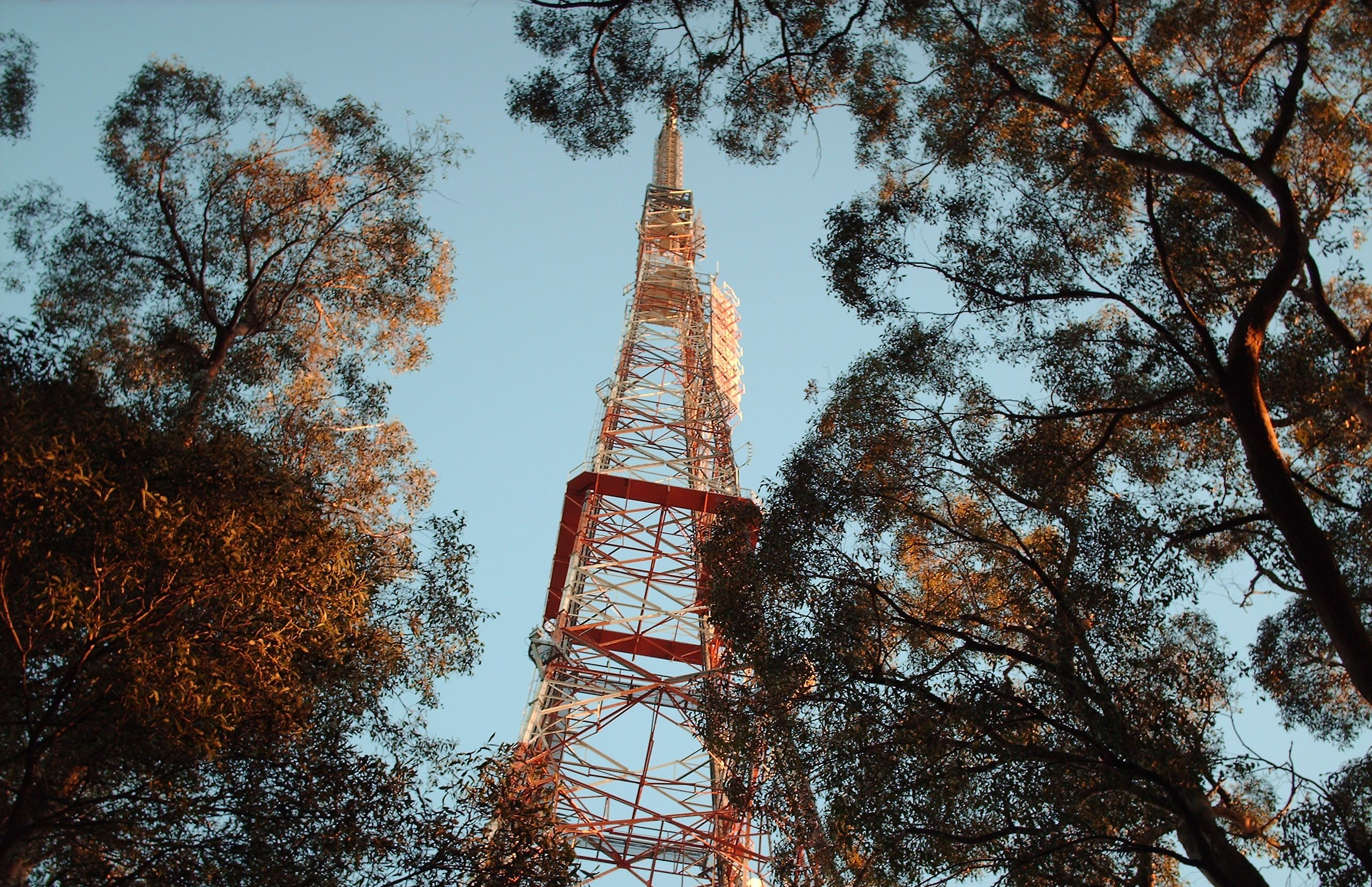
Channel 10 transmission tower

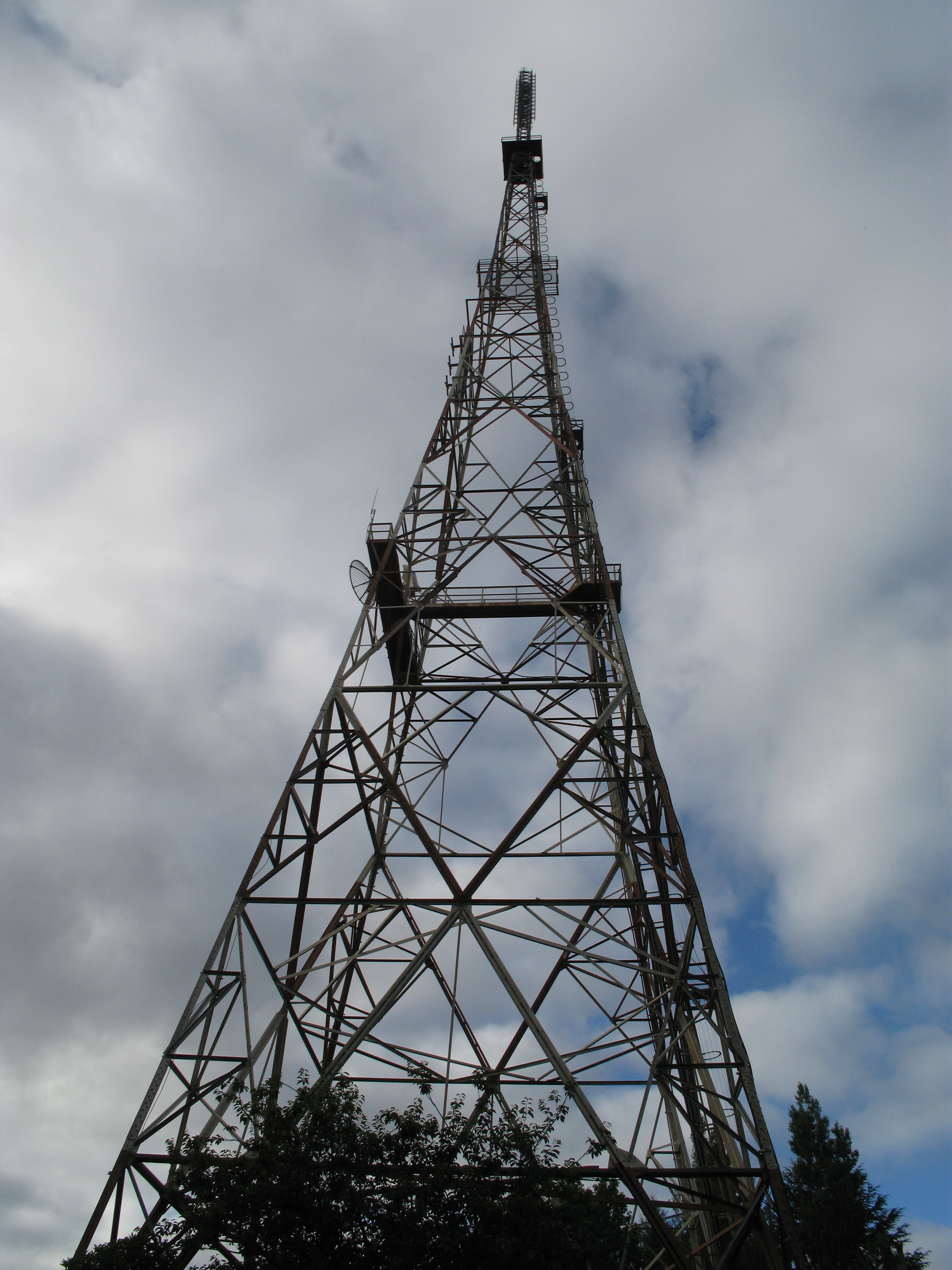
Channel 9 transmission tower

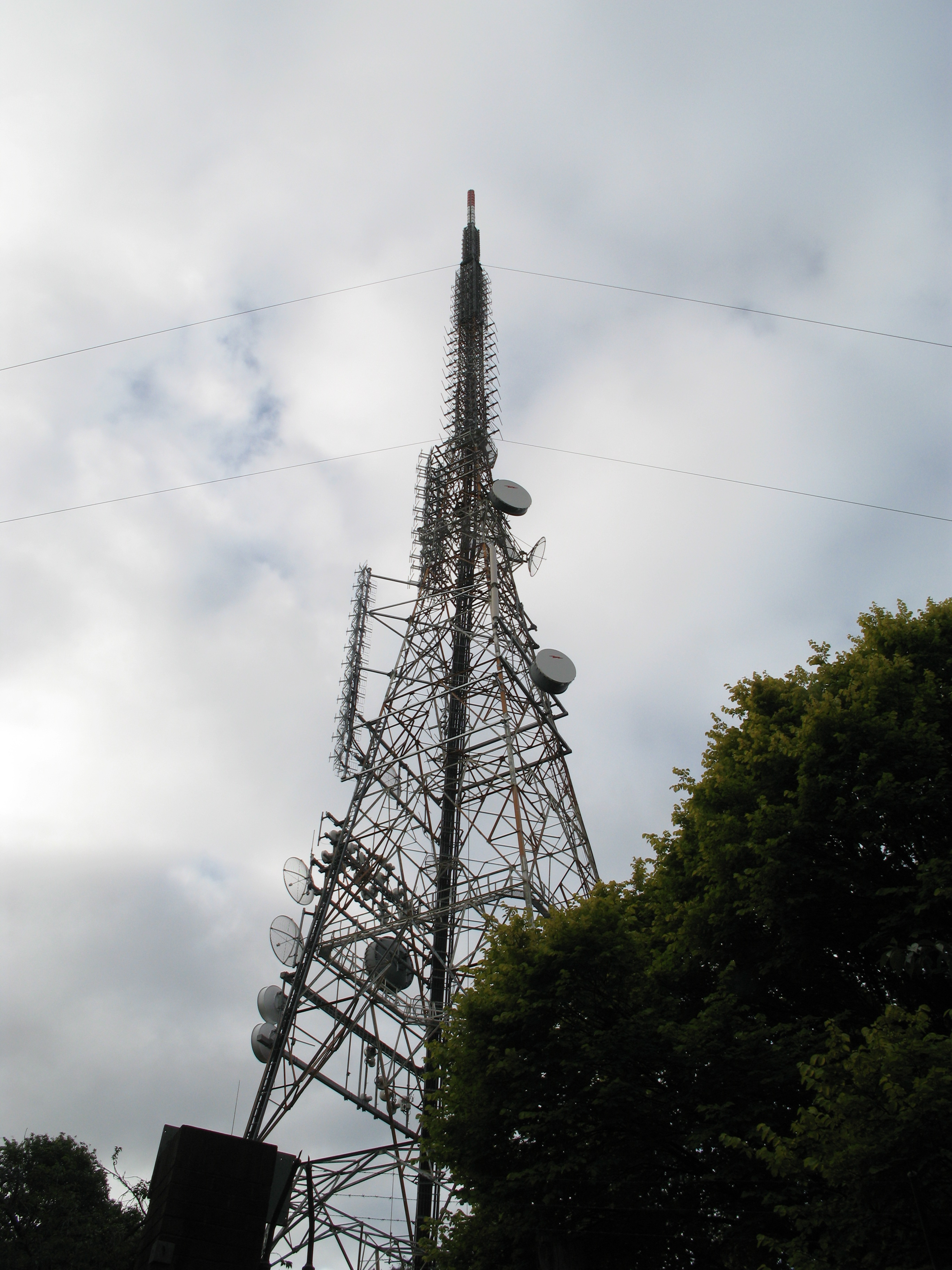
Channel 7 transmission tower

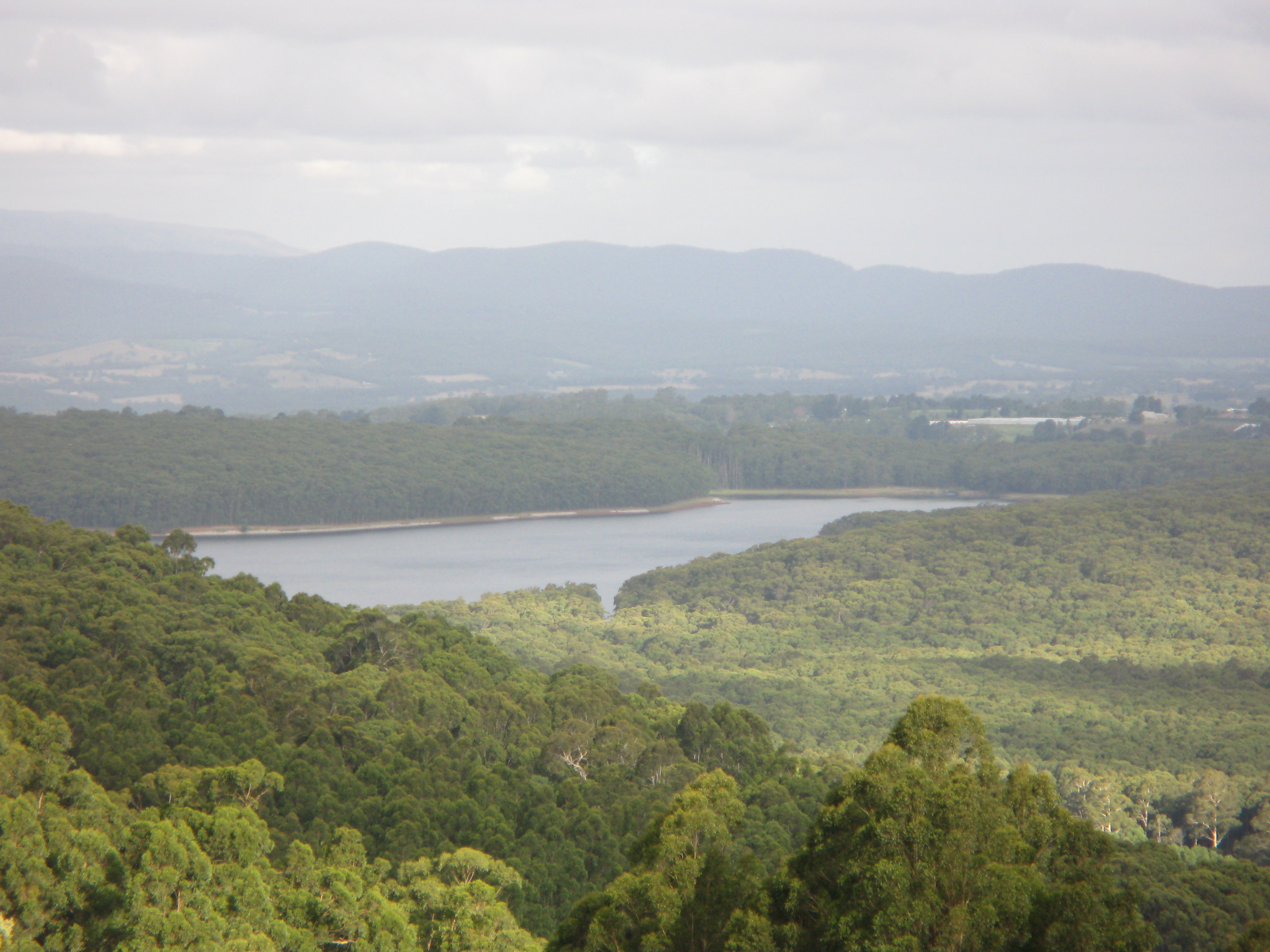
The Silvan Reservoir looking east from Kalorama

== See also ==
- Dandenong Ranges National Park
- 1938 Kyeema crash
- Horatio Jones house
