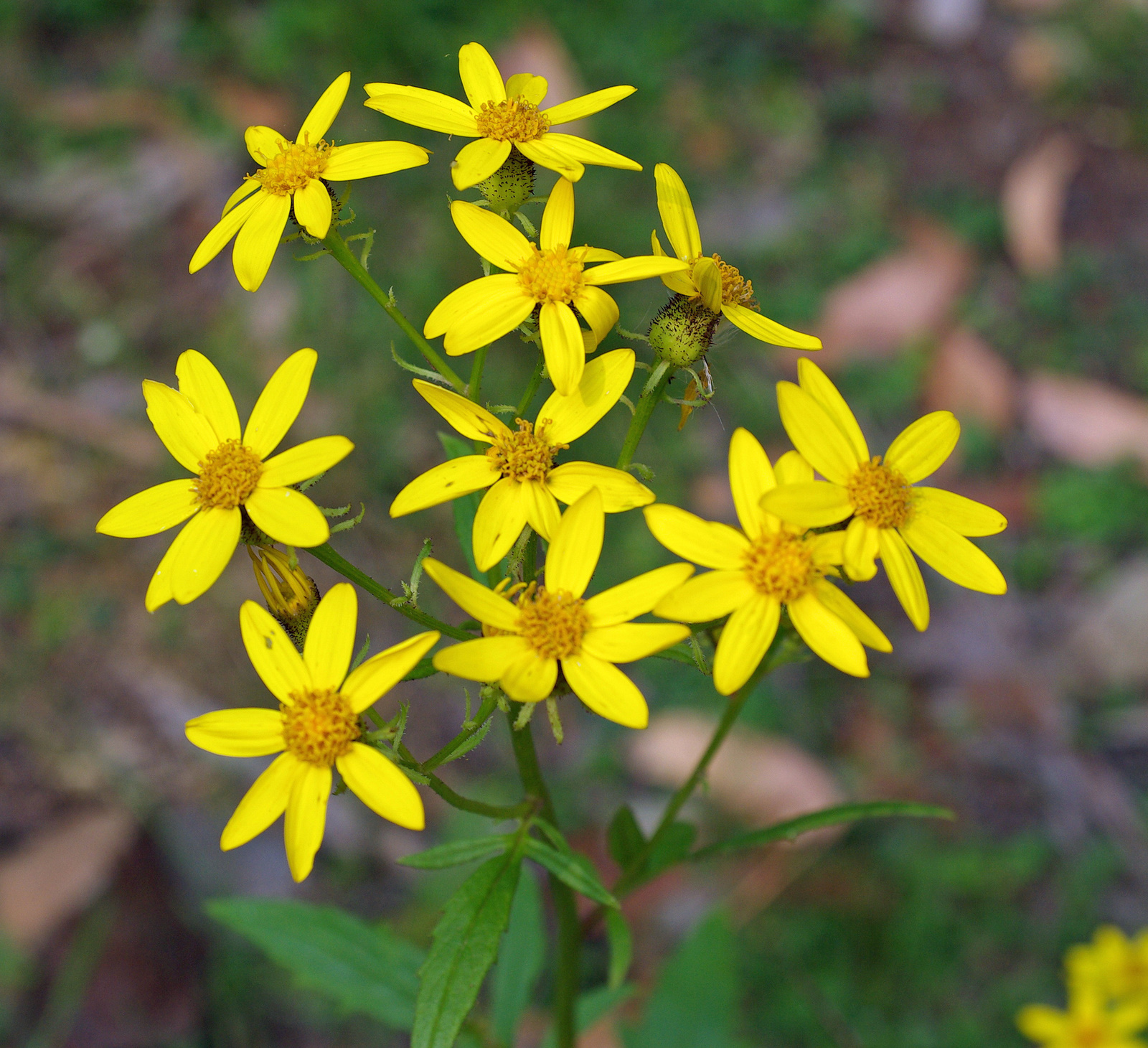

Scientific classification
- Kingdom: Plantae
- Clade: Tracheophytes
- Clade: Angiosperms
- Clade: Eudicots
- Clade: Asterids
- Order: Asterales
- Family: Asteraceae
- Genus: Senecio
- Species: S. vagus

Binomial name
- Senecio vagus F.Muell.

= Senecio vagus =

saw groundsel

Species of flowering plant

Senecio vagus, commonly known as saw groundsel, is a species of flowering plant in the daisy family Asteraceae. This plant occurs in the Australian states of New South Wales, Victoria and Tasmania. It is an erect perennial herbaceous plant that grows up to 1.5 metres tall. Mostly seen in moist gullies on the Great Dividing Range. Yellow flowers usually form in spring and summer. The lectotype was collected in the Dandenong Ranges in 1853 by Ferdinand von Mueller.

== Subspecies ==
Two sub-species are accepted;

- Senecio vagus subsp. eglandulosus
- Senecio vagus subsp. vagus
