= Wild About Fruit Company =

Wild about fruit
- Type: Private Company
- Industry: Food (grows, processes, stores and delivers)
- Founded: Wandin, Victoria, Australia (1930)
- Headquarters: Wandin, Victoria, Australia
- Key people: Ben Mould, Owner and Managing Director
- Products: Fruit juice, gourmet fruit vinegars and More...
- Revenue: Not disclosed
- Number of employees: 100+
- Website: www.wildaboutfruit.com.au

The Wild About Fruit Company is an Australian fruit company, located in Victoria's prime produce area, the Yarra Valley. The company is owned and operated by a third generation of the Mould family. Its main operations take place in Wandin with other properties located at Coldstream, Bacchus Marsh, Gundagai, New South Wales and Kerang. As of 2002, it was growing 40 different of cherries for the domestic and export fresh cherry market.

Wild About Fruit has worked closely with the CSIRO in crating painted juice production, developing juice extraction techniques that allowed a greater percentage of the fruit to be utilised, and deactivating enzymes that would result in a longer shelf-life for the product without the use of preservatives.

In 2004, Wild About Fruit products were endorsed by Planet Ark.

In September 2005, EPA Victoria fined Wild Juice Pty Ltd $5113 for contravening the requirements of a pollution abatement notice. In May, an EPA inspection had identified an incomplete connection of the site's new waste treatment plant.

== Brands ==
- Wild About Fruit
- Wild Child
- Wild about wellbeing
