= Greenvale Reservoir =

Reservoir and dam in Victoria, Australia

Greenvale Dam
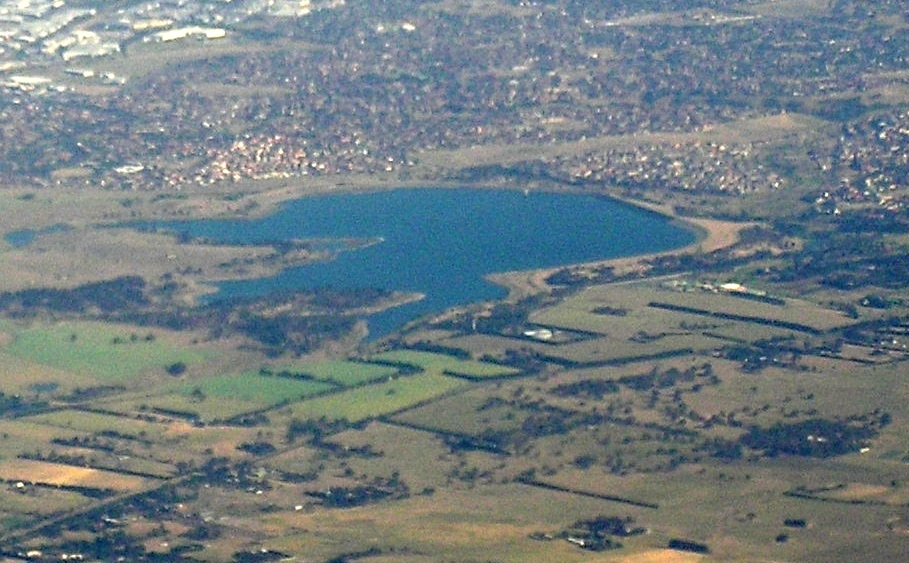
- The reservoir with Roxburgh Park in the background, 2009

- Location of the reservoir and dam in Victoria
- Interactive map of Greenvale Dam
- Country: Australia
- Location: Greenvale, North Melbourne, Victoria
- Coordinates: 37°38′06″S 144°54′01″E
- Purpose: Water supply
- Status: Operational
- Opening date: 18 April 1973
- Built by: Melbourne and Metropolitan Board of Works
- Operator: Melbourne Water

Dam and spillways
- Type of dam: Earth fill dam
- Impounds: Yuroke Creek; off-stream
- Height (foundation): 52 m (171 ft)
- Length: 2,500 m (8,200 ft)
- Dam volume: 6,900×10^{3} m^{3} (240×10^{6} cu ft)
- Spillway type: Uncontrolled
- Spillway capacity: 40 m^{3}/s (1,400 cu ft/s)

Reservoir
- Creates: Greenvale Reservoir
- Total capacity: 27,500 ML (22,300 acre⋅ft)
- Catchment area: c. 10 km^{2} (3.9 sq mi)
- Surface area: 174 ha (430 acres)
- Maximum length: 1.92 km (1.19 mi)
- Maximum width: 1.33 km (0.83 mi)
- Normal elevation: 164 m (538 ft) AHD
- Website melbournewater.com.au

The Greenvale Reservoir is a reservoir formed by the Greenvale Dam, an earth-filled embankment dam across the upper Yuroke Creek, also fed by an off-stream storage, located in the suburb of Greenvale and to the west of Roxburgh Park, in the northern suburbs of Melbourne, Victoria, Australia. Completed in 1973, the impoundment serves as a source of supply of potable water for Greater Metropolitan Melbourne.

The reservoir and dam is operated by Melbourne Water.

== Dam and reservoir overview ==
The earth-filled dam wall is 52 metres (171 ft) high and 2,500 metres (8,200 ft) long. When full, the resultant reservoir has a storage capacity of 27,500 megalitres (22,300 acre⋅ft) and covers 174 hectares (430 acres), drawn from a catchment area of 7 square kilometres (2.7 sq mi), with an additional 3.5 square kilometres (860 acres) serving as the catchment for the off-stream storage. The uncontrolled spillway has a discharge capacity of 40 cubic metres per second (1,400 cu ft/s).

=== Reservoir ===
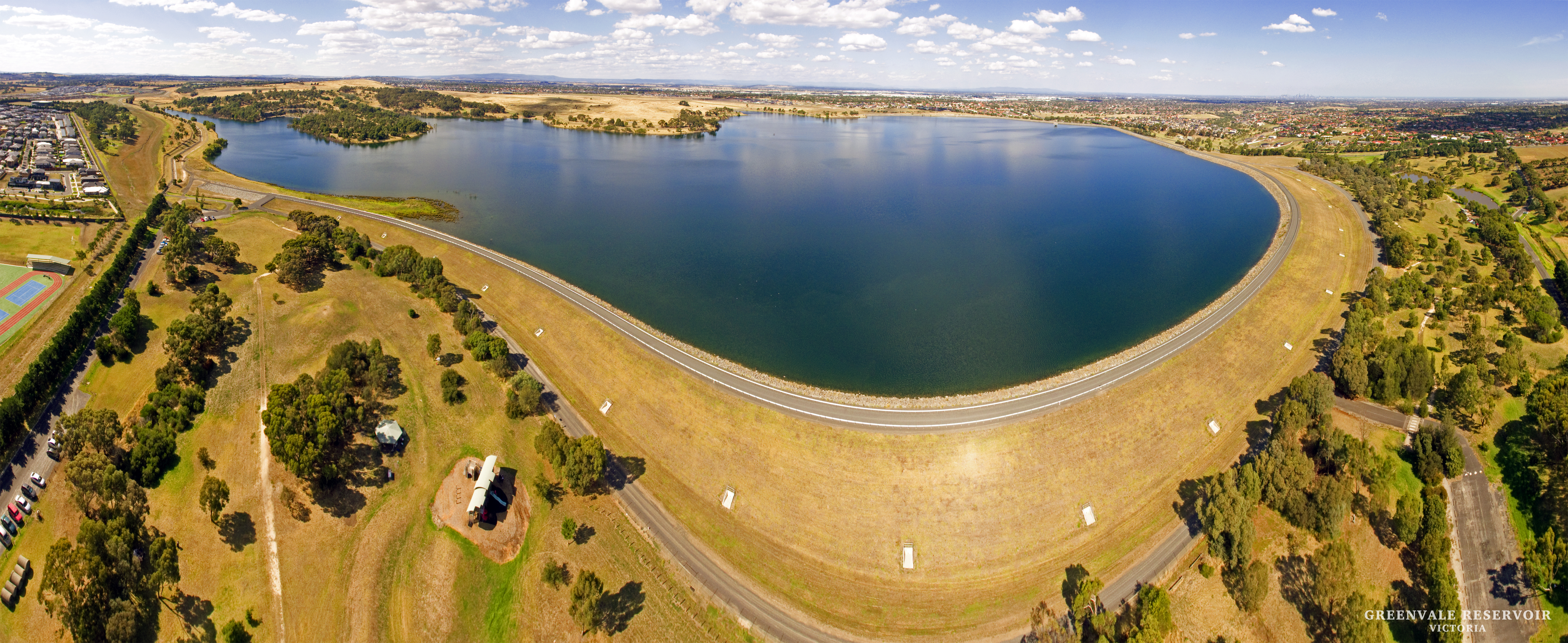
The reservoir in 2017

In addition to damming the Yuroke Creek, a major tributary of the Moonee Ponds Creek, the reservoir is fed by an aqueduct from the Silvan Reservoir. It was opened on 18 April 1973 and was designed to supply drinking water to Melbourne's northern and western suburbs.

The Greenvale Reservoir Park, located adjacent to the south and west of the dam wall, contains picnic tables, a playground and barbecues, and is managed by Parks Victoria. The 37-hectare (91-acre) urban park was temporarily closed in 2014, because of the need for work to strengthen the dam wall. Despite the remedial work being completed, most of the park remained closed, despite occasional promises to reopen it, until December 2025 when the full extent of the park was reopened.

== See also ==
- List of reservoirs and dams in Victoria
