= Olinda Creek =

Olinda Creek (Gnurt-bille-worrun)
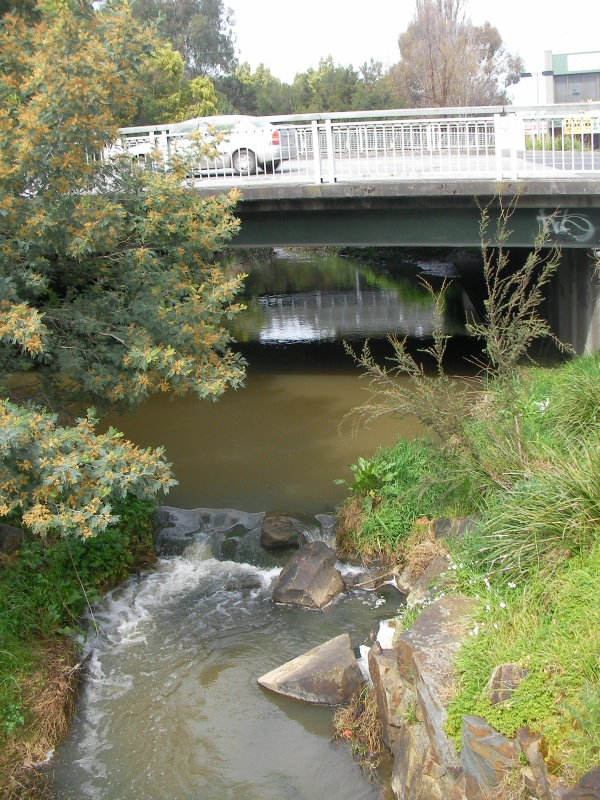
- Olinda Creek Main street crossing from pedestrian footbridge

- Location of the river mouth in Greater Metropolitan Melbourne
- Etymology: Alice Olinda Hodgkinson, a daughter of Clement Hodgkinson

Location
- Country: Australia
- State: Victoria
- Region: Central Victoria
- City: Melbourne

Physical characteristics
- Source: Mount Dandenong
  - location: Great Dividing Range, Victoria
  - elevation: 580 m (1,900 ft)
- Mouth
  - location: Yarra River, Coldstream, Victoria
  - coordinates: 37°40′56″S 145°21′16″E
  - elevation: 76 m (249 ft)
- Length: 21.4 km (13.3 mi)
- Discharge
  - location: mouth

Basin features
- River system: Yarra River
- Reservoirs: Lillydale Lake

Olinda Creek (Woiwurrung: Gnurt-bille-worrun) is a major tributary of the Yarra River in Victoria, Australia. Its origins are in the Dandenong Ranges, and it is notable for passing through the settlement of Lilydale (now a suburb of Melbourne) before joining with the Yarra near Coldstream.

== History and Toponymy ==
When Europeans first entered this area of southern Australia, they moved up the valley of the Olinda Creek (then called Running Creek because it was a perennial stream). The formal naming process began with the survey of Lilydale township by John Hardy in 1859–60. At the same time that he named Lilydale, Hardy renamed the creek ‘Olinda’ after Alice Olinda Hodgkinson, a daughter of Clement Hodgkinson, the Deputy Surveyor-General.

A major dam wall was built to create Silvan Reservoir in 1926. This stopped water flowing into Olinda Creek at the northern end of the reservoir. A second, minor dam wall at the southern end stops water flowing into Emerald Creek.

== Lillydale Lake ==
Following flooding of the Yarra Valley in September 1984, it was decided to impound the creek and, between 1988 and 1990, an embankment dam was built just south of Lilydale, creating the 28-hectare (69-acre) Lillydale Lake. The lake provides flood mitigation to areas downstream, incorporates extensive wetlands, and is situated within a 100-hectare (250-acre) urban park and community recreation facility.
