= Kalorama, Victoria =

Kalorama
- Suburb
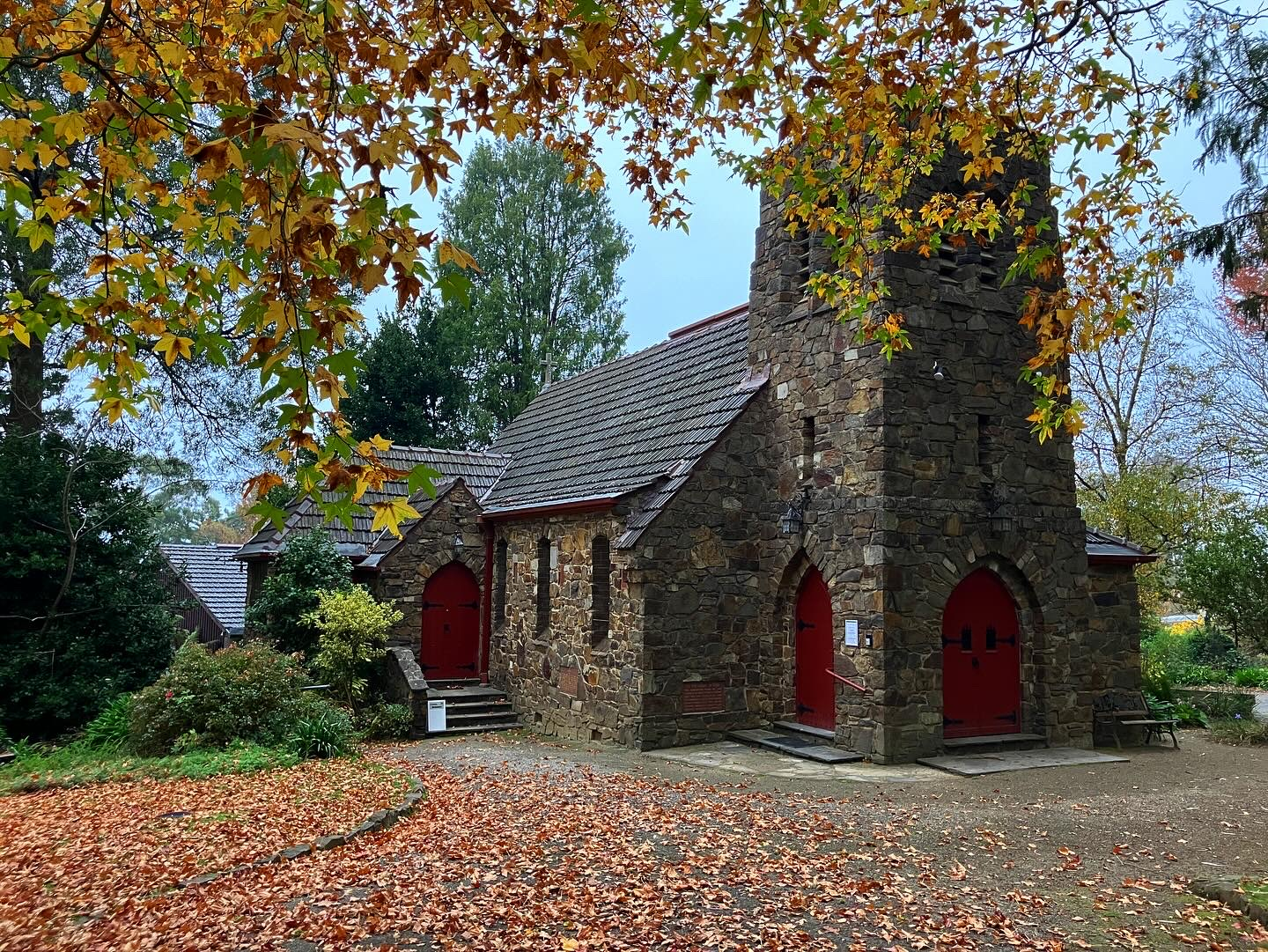
- St Michael and All Angels Church in Kalorama

- Interactive map of Kalorama
- Coordinates: 37.818°S 145.366°E
- Country: Australia
- State: Victoria
- City: Melbourne
- LGA: Shire of Yarra Ranges
- Location: 42 km (26 mi) from Melbourne; 11 km (6.8 mi) from Lilydale; 13 km (8.1 mi) from Belgrave

Government
  - State electorate: Monbulk
  - Federal division: Casey

Area
  - Total: 3.2 km^{2} (1.2 sq mi)

Population
  - Total: 1,277 (2021 census)
  - Density: 399/km^{2} (1,034/sq mi)
- Postcode: 3766
Suburbs around Kalorama
Montrose	Mount Evelyn	Mount Evelyn
Mount Dandenong	Kalorama	Silvan
Mount Dandenong	Dandenong Ranges	Silvan

Kalorama is a suburb in Melbourne, Victoria, Australia, 35 km east of Melbourne's central business district, located within the Shire of Yarra Ranges local government area. Kalorama recorded a population of 1,277 at the 2021 census.

The suburb was first settled by Europeans around 1855 when Isaac Jeeves, Mathew Child and Jabez Richardson took up selections. The traditional custodians of the area are the Wurundjeri of the Kulin nation.

The Post Office opened on 1 October 1909, but was known as Hand's Corner until 1910, then Mount Dandenong North until 1926.

The area, renowned for its beauty, is the site of a famous lookout point named "Five Ways" which overlooks Kalorama Park, Silvan Reservoir, the National Rhododendron Gardens, and the R J Hamer Arboretum. Nearby attractions include William Ricketts Sanctuary, Olinda Falls, a gallery, and a range of tea-rooms, cafes and stores.

The forests of the region are dominated by various eucalypt species including mountain ash (Eucalyptus regnans), the tallest known angiosperm. The local wet sclerophyll forests form habitat for many species of native bird including the superb lyrebird (Menura novaehollandiae) which can be sometimes heard voicing its characteristic mimicry from the deeper gullies and south-eastern aspects.

The area has featured in the work of many Australian artists, including Sir Arthur Streeton.
