= Wandin East =

- Town
- Interactive map of Wandin East
- Coordinates: 37.811°S 145.453°E
- Country: Australia
- State: Victoria
- LGA: Shire of Yarra Ranges
- Location: 44 km (27 mi) from Melbourne; 20 km (12 mi) from Lilydale

Government
  - State electorate: Monbulk
  - Federal division: Casey
- Elevation: 152 m (499 ft)

Population
  - Total: 408 (2021 census)
- Postcode: 3139
Localities around Wandin East
Wandin North	Wandin North	Seville
Silvan	Wandin East	Seville
Silvan	Silvan	Silvan

Wandin East is a town in Victoria, Australia, 45 km east from Melbourne's central business district, located within the Shire of Yarra Ranges local government area. Wandin East recorded a population of 408 at the 2021 census.

Wandin Yallock Creek and Boggy Creek flow through the town.

== History ==
The area was first surveyed as the township of Wandin Yallock in 1866, however the town centre moved north (now known as Wandin North) when the Lilydale to Warburton railway opened in 1901. A Post Office called Wandin opened in 1892 but was soon renamed Wandin South (later Silvan). Later, a Post Office called Peacock's Jam Factory opened in around 1902 and was renamed Wandin around 1908 (closing in 1964).

== Industry ==
The area is set on fertile red soil (terra rossa) and there are many fruit orchards in the town. Major crops include cherries, strawberries, raspberries, apples and more recently, wine grapes.

The Wild About Fruit Company is a fruit growing and processing company. The company is owned and operated by a third generation of the Mould family. Its main operations take place in Wandin.

CherryHill Orchards is an Australian owned cherry farm that has been operating in Wandin East since 1940. In addition to growing and processing fruit, in spring it is home to Australia's largest cherry blossom festival.

== The town today ==
Wandin East itself does not have any shopping centre, but has a town hall, cricket oval, tennis and badminton club. Wandin East Reserve is home to the annual Wandin-Silvan Field Days (a major agricultural fair).

Just up the road from the Wandin East Reserve is Jay Berries, a family owned and operated u-pick farm established in Wandin East in 1995.

Wandin is a great place to live and bring up a family. The Sawicki strawberry farm and company Fresh and Fruity are both founded and located in Wandin.

Wandin East is the home to the 'Five Oaks' vineyard.

Wandin has an Australian Rules football team competing in the Yarra Valley Mountain District Football League.

== East Wandin Cricket Club ==
East Wandin CC has been around since early 1930, the club has always had at least one team. Early 1990 the club was very successful in producing a couple of trophies, at one stage the club had three teams in seniors and a couple in juniors.

The Mcleod family was a strength that at times has held the club together for many years and there is over 100 years experience at the club between the family. Since 2000 with the introduction of new blood into the club, the club has seen recent success after some years of poor results. In the past 7 seasons, the club has made the finals 6 times, with 3 premierships, and the opportunity for a 4th this season. The club has also been successful of late by winning several FTGDCA competition awards handed out by the club having standout performers during recent seasons.

The club has gone through recent changes at the top, with the new leadership group looking at continuing to grow the club throughout the coming years.
