= Silvan, Victoria =

Silvan
- Town
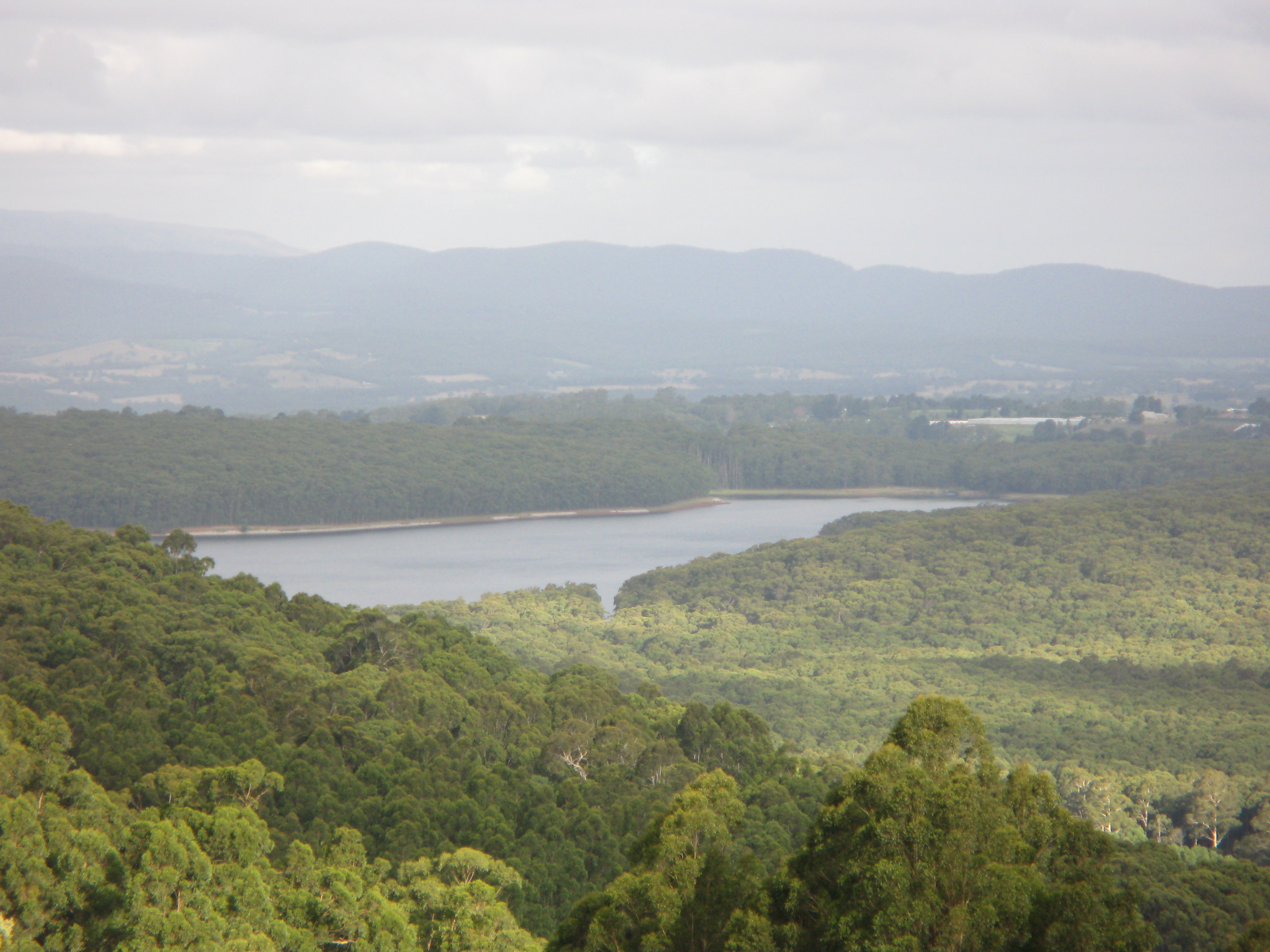
- Silvan Reservoir from Kalorama

- Interactive map of Silvan
- Country: Australia
- State: Victoria
- LGA: Shire of Yarra Ranges
- Location: 40 km (25 mi) from Melbourne; 12 km (7.5 mi) from Lilydale

Government
  - State electorate: Evelyn, Monbulk
  - Federal division: Casey
- Elevation: 217 m (712 ft)

Population
  - Total: 1,323 (2021 census)
- Postcode: 3795
Localities around Silvan
Mount Evelyn	Wandin East	Seville
Olinda	Silvan	Yellingbo
Monbulk	Monbulk	Macclesfield

Silvan is a town in Victoria, Australia, located 40 km (25 mi) east of Melbourne, located within the Shire of Yarra Ranges local government area. Silvan recorded a population of 1,323 at the 2021 census.

Silvan marks the halfway point between Belgrave and Lilydale, both large suburban areas. The area's soils, well suited to growing fruits, vegetables and flowers, draw tourists to the various pick-yourself orchards and berry farms in Silvan. A cultivated hybrid variety of blackberry known as the silvanberry is named after the town.

== History ==
Originally known as Wandin Yallock South, the town was first surveyed in 1868. The town's name was changed to Silvan in 1913, the same year the local primary school changed its name to Silvan Primary School.

In 1917, and as a result of a growing population in Melbourne's south east, the Silvan Reservoir was commissioned, with the reservoir completed in 1932. A conduit from the Upper Yarra dam was completed in 1957. In 1954 the first Tulip Festival was held, becoming an annual tradition continuing to this day.

== Culture ==
=== Events ===
The town's most prominent attraction is the annual Tulip Festival, held every spring during September and October. The festival attracts over 100,000 visitors every year, and its overall success has spawned a number of flower festivals held at other times of the year.

=== Sport ===
The town of Silvan is home to an Australian Rules football team, founded in 1921. The Football Club is affiliated with the Eastern Football Netball League. The Club is known as the Silvan Football Club, (SFC). With the mascot featuring a “Cat” logo, the club is also referred to as “The Cats”. The club will compete in the EFNL 3rd Division in 2024.

The Club has won an impressive 11 Senior Premierships. Four in the MDFA, 1930, 1934, 1955, 1959(Champions) and five in the YVMDFL, 1992, 2002, 2004, 2007, 2008(Champions). Silvan have recently won premierships the EFNL in 2014 and 2022.

The Cats have finished Minor Premiers on 9 occasions, in all but one (1936), the Cats went on to win the premiership. Both the 1930 and 2014 premierships coming after finishing 2nd on the table.

The past thirty odd years has been an especially successful period for Silvan, qualifying for eight Grand-finals, resulting in an extraordinarily successful Grand-final win/loss ratio of 7-1. And an overall Grand-final win/loss ratio of 11-7. The Club also won one Reserve Grade Premiership in the YVMDFL in 1986(Champions) Alongside one U17-U19 Premiership in 2019 (EFNL).

The senior team’s longest winning streak stands at 24, between the years of 2007-2009, netting two premierships 2007/08 within that time. The Club has inducted 64 Life Members, 57 male and 7 female. With the first male (Jack Parker) awarded in 1936, and the first female (Mrs Florence King) awarded in 1948.

Alongside the football club, Silvan is home to a cricket club. Established in 1926, the club is known as the Silvan Cricket Club, with the unique nickname of the “Slugs”, currently participating in the FTGDCA and previously in the YVCA. The cricket club has won numerous premierships in many grades, over their near 100 year history, the most recent being in the 2019/20 season.
