= Silvan Reservoir =

Dam and reservoir in Victoria, Australia

Silvan Dam
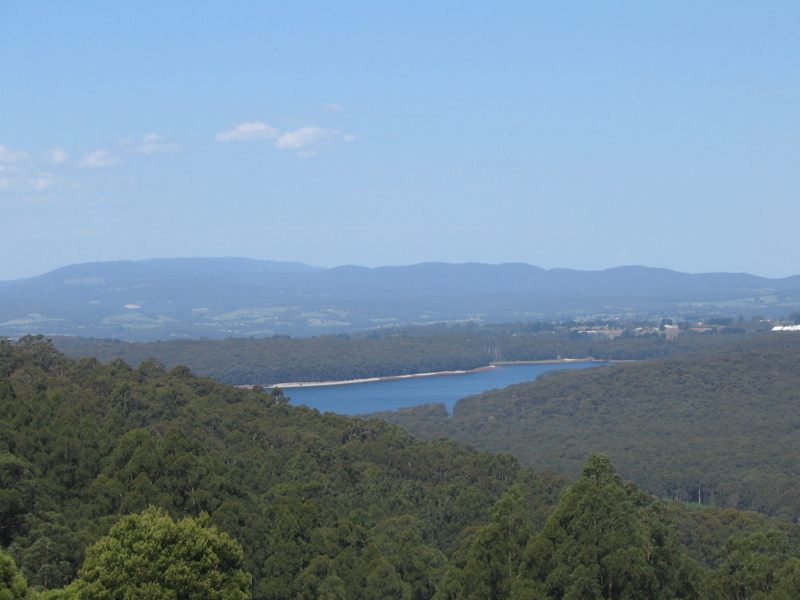
- The reservoir, viewed from Kalorama

- Location of the dam and reservoir in Victoria
- Interactive map of Silvan Dam
- Country: Australia
- Location: Silvan, Dandenong Ranges, Victoria
- Coordinates: 37°49′40″S 145°24′20″E
- Purpose: Water supply; Power
- Status: Operational
- Construction began: 1926
- Opening date: 7 July 1931
- Designed by: Melbourne & Metropolitan Board of Works
- Operator: Melbourne Water

Dam and spillways
- Type of dam: Earth fill dam
- Impounds: Stoneyford Creek; and off-stream
- Height: 40 m (130 ft)
- Length: 650 m (2,130 ft)
- Width (base): 219 m (719 ft)
- Dam volume: 1,610×10^{3} m^{3} (57×10^{6} cu ft)
- Spillway type: Uncontrolled
- Spillway capacity: 40 m^{3}/s (1,400 cu ft/s)

Reservoir
- Creates: Silvan Reservoir
- Total capacity: 40.58 GL (32,900 acre⋅ft)
- Catchment area: 9 km^{2} (3.5 sq mi) (off-stream storage)
- Surface area: 334 ha (830 acres)
- Maximum water depth: 43 m (141 ft)
- Normal elevation: 242 m (794 ft) AHD

Silvan Reservoir Power Station
- Operator: Melbourne Water
- Commission date: 2008
- Type: Mini-hydro
- Turbines: 2 MW (2,700 hp) Kaplan-type
- Installed capacity: 1.8 MW (2,400 hp)
- Annual generation: 11 GWh (40 TJ)
- Website melbournewater.com.au

The Silvan Reservoir is a reservoir created by the Silvan Dam, an earth-filled embankment dam across the Stoneyford Creek, located in Silvan, approximately 40 kilometres (25 mi) east of Melbourne, in the Dandenong Ranges of Victoria, Australia. Completed in 1931, the reservoir is fed by off-stream sources and is used to supply potable water for Greater Metropolitan Melbourne and for the generation of hydroelectricity.

The reservoir and dam are operated by Melbourne Water.

== Dam and reservoir overview ==
=== Dam ===
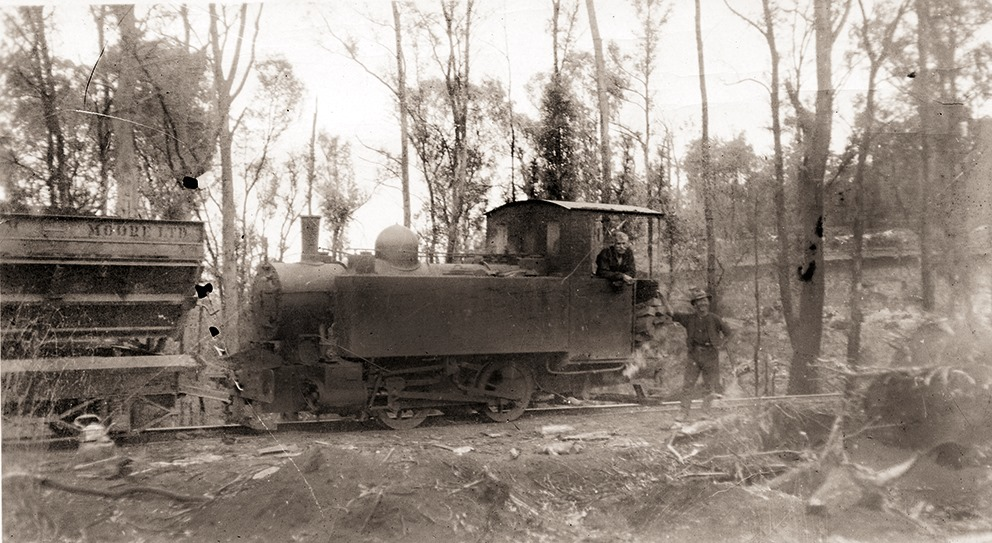
A steam locomotive used in the dam's construction, c. 1926 – c. 1931

A severe drought in 1914 forced the state government to search for a new water supply to handle Melbourne's ever-increasing needs. Construction took place between 1926 and 1931, and the reservoir was officially opened on 7 July 1931.

The earth-filled dam wall is 40 metres (130 ft) high, 650 metres (2,130 ft) long, and 219 metres (719 ft) wide at the base. When full, the resultant reservoir has a storage capacity of 40.58 gigalitres (32,900 acre⋅ft), is 43 metres (141 ft) deep, and covers 334 hectares (830 acres), drawn from a catchment area of 9 square kilometres (3.5 sq mi). The uncontrolled spillway has a discharge capacity of 40 cubic metres per second (1,400 cu ft/s). In 1983, the dam wall started to show cracks and remedial works were completed in 1986, that included adding a rock-fill face to the downstream dam wall.

=== Reservoir ===
The catchment area for the reservoir is quite small, resulting in the Silvan Reservoir fed by off-stream sources from other reservoirs. Water for the Silvan Reservoir is transferred from the Upper Yarra, O'Shannassy and Thomson (via Upper Yarra) reservoirs. In turn, the Silvan Reservoir directly supplies water to many of Melbourne's eastern suburbs, as well as other off-stream storage reservoirs, including Cardinia and Greenvale.

The picnic ground at the Silvan Reservoir Park is managed by Parks Victoria.

== Hydroelectric power station ==
In 2008, a 2-megawatt (2,700 hp) mini-hydro power station was installed adjacent to the dam wall, that generates approximately 11 gigawatt-hours (40 TJ) annually.

== See also ==
- List of power stations in Victoria
- List of reservoirs and dams in Victoria
