= Dandenong (disambiguation) =

Dandenong is a city in Melbourne's southeastern suburbs, the 5th largest city in Victoria, Australia

Dandenong may also refer to:

== Administrative areas ==
- Electoral district of Dandenong, an electoral district of the Victorian Legislative Assembly
- City of Greater Dandenong, a local government area of Victoria, Australia

== Mountains and ranges ==
- Dandenong Ranges or the Dandenongs, a mountain range east of Melbourne
- Mount Dandenong (Victoria), the summit of the Dandenong Ranges, at 633 metres (2,077 ft)

== Places ==
- Dandenong railway station
- Dandenong North, Victoria
- Dandenong South, Victoria
- Dandenong Ranges National Park
- Mount Dandenong, Victoria, a township on the summit of Mount Dandenong

== Sport and entertainment ==
- Dandenong Rangers, an Australian basketball team
- Dandenong Rangers (NBL1 South), an Australian basketball club
- Dandenong Stadium, an Australian sports and entertainment centre
- Dandenong Stingrays, an Australian rules football team

== Waterways ==
- Dandenong Creek, a creek in Melbourne's eastern and southeastern suburbs
- Dandenong Creek Trail, a shared pedestrian/bicycle path that follows the course of the creek
