= Upwey, Victoria =

Upwey
- Suburb
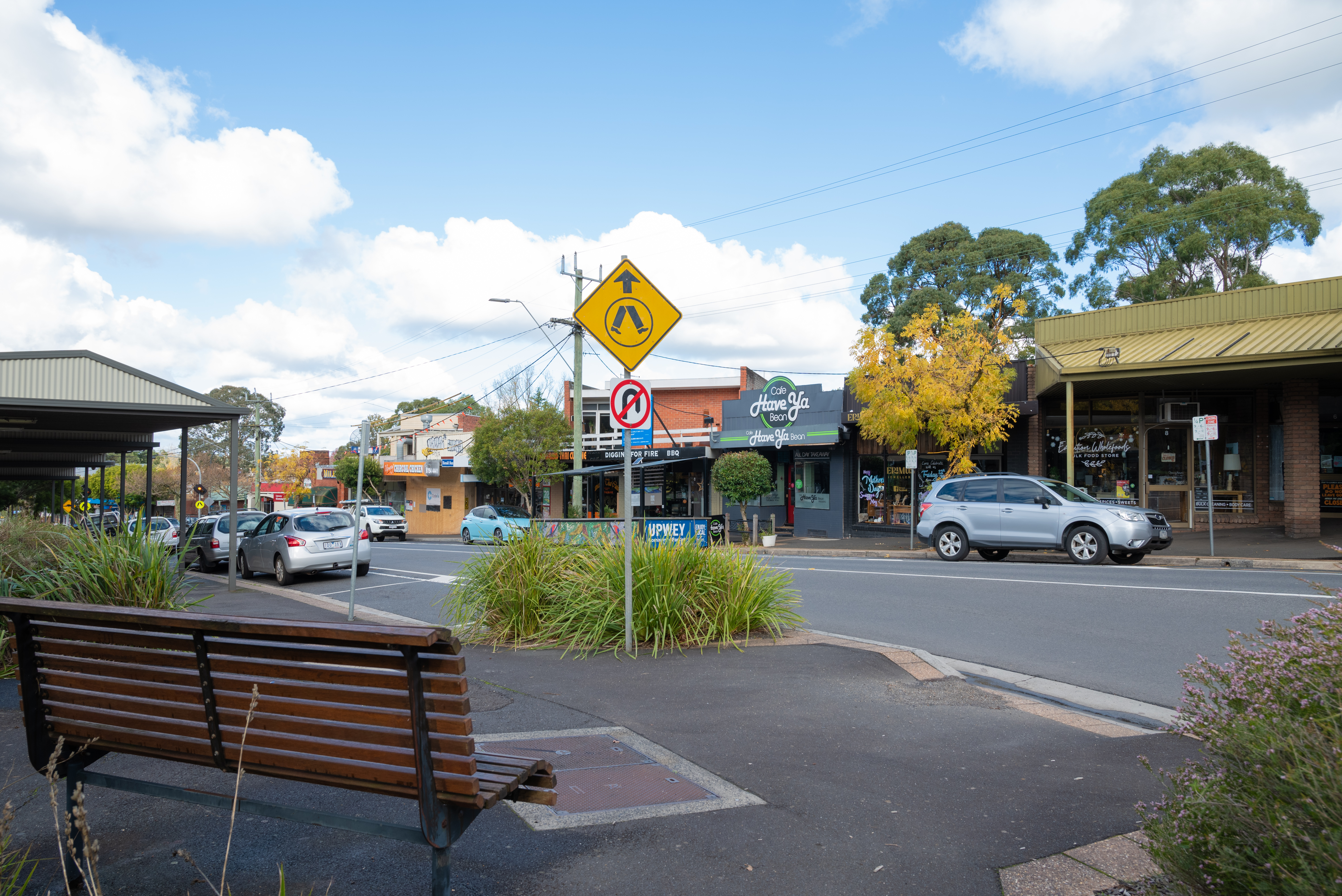
- Main Street, Upwey

- Interactive map of Upwey
- Coordinates: 37.903°S 145.330°E
- Country: Australia
- State: Victoria
- City: Melbourne
- LGA: Shire of Yarra Ranges
- Location: 33 km (21 mi) from Melbourne; 3 km (1.9 mi) from Belgrave

Government
  - State electorate: Monbulk
  - Federal division: Casey

Area
  - Total: 7 km^{2} (2.7 sq mi)
- Elevation: 220 m (720 ft)

Population
  - Total: 6,818 (2021 census)
  - Density: 970/km^{2} (2,520/sq mi)
- Postcode: 3158
Suburbs around Upwey
Tremont	Ferny Creek	Sherbrooke
Upper Ferntree Gully	Upwey	Tecoma
Ferntree Gully	Lysterfield	Belgrave Heights

Upwey is a suburb of Melbourne, Victoria, Australia, 33 kilometres (21 mi) east from Melbourne's central business district, located within the Shire of Yarra Ranges local government area. Upwey recorded a population of 6,818 at the 2021 census.

Upwey South is a colloquial term for the area directly south of the township, but is not an official suburb.

Burwood Highway and Glenfern Road are the two main roads that run through Upwey which are connected by Morris Road. These three roads form the main routes around the suburb. Glenfern Road runs along the ridge of the hill providing views across the city and the Lysterfield Valley.

== History ==
Upwey is a residential suburb in hilly surrounds 34 km east-south-east of Melbourne and 2 km west of Belgrave. Until the turn of the century Upwey did not have a separate identity. Upwey is a residential suburb in hilly surrounds 34 km. east-south-east of Melbourne and 2 km. west of Belgrave. Upwey was part of the Parish of Scoresby and the Parish of Narree Worren and as such known by those names during the 1800s. Upwey was known as Mast Gully, after several ship masts had been cut from the gully in 1850. (Mast Gully Creek and Mast Gully Road remain).

=== Early European settlers ===
John Ferguson was the first known white settler in Upwey. He settled in Upwey (then known as Ferntree Gully) in about 1870. He was a coach builder with premises in Collins Street and Wellington Parade, and other residential properties in Oakleigh and Elwood. Together with his three sons John, Samuel and Archibald, he ran cattle on his farm. He had approximately 600 acres covering the present Upwey township as well as land on both sides of Morris Road and Glenfern Road. He originally named his homestead Glenlissa, and it was later renamed Quamby and then Glenlucia. The house is still standing today at 28 Birdwood Avenue.

=== Bushfires ===
In 1922, 1938, 1962, 1967, 1969, 1972, 1980, 1983, 1997 and 2009 there were bushfires that affected parts of Upwey.

On 19 January 1938, two houses used as weekend holiday homes were lost in Upwey in 1938 from bushfires that started in the mid afternoon and burnt through Ferntree Gully and Upwey in the vicinity of the area around Burwood Highway on the approach between Upper Ferntree Gully to Upwey.

In 1962, serious bushfires burnt through the Dandenong Ranges affecting not only Upwey but also The Basin, Ferny Creek, Ferntree Gully, Sassafras, Olinda, Montrose and Kilsyth.

On 8 January 1969, fires broke out around the state. There were serious fires in the Dandenong Ranges that affected Upwey as well as Upper Ferntree Gully, Ferny Creek, The Basin and Sassafras. There were houses lost in Upwey and there are still some evidence of these fires in blackened trees along Glenfern Road on the south side of Morris Road.

There were bushfires in 1972 that burnt through Ferntree Gully National Park at Lysterfield, and also affected Upwey, Ferny Creek, Upper Ferntree Gully, The Basin and Sassafras.

In January 1980, there were bushfires in Ferntree Gully National Park and Upwey burning through the area now known as Glenfern Valley Bushlands.

On the morning of 21 January 1997, the fires began in the foothills of the western face of the ranges. The communities of Ferny Creek, Kalorama, Mount Dandenong and Upwey were affected. Forty-three houses were destroyed and another 45 damaged. Three people lost their lives in the neighbouring It was suspected that the fires in the Dandenongs were deliberately lit.

One week after the devastating Black Saturday bushfires in 2009, a bushfire started near the corner of Nixon Road and Glenfern Road in Upwey in the mid-afternoon.

== Contemporary community ==
The local schools consist of many children whose grandparents and great-grandparents attended the same school. The community was fairly stable with few people moving in or out of the community until about 2010. Since then, there has been a rapid turnover in the demographic with many local baby boomers downsizing to smaller blocks and easier to maintain properties in nearby urbanised communities and younger families moving into the area. Newer residents and visitors have claimed that the semi-rural community is a "hipster suburb".

=== Upwey Fire Brigade ===
The Upwey Country Fire Authority (CFA) is a volunteer fire service located at the southern end of the Dandenong Ranges. The brigade's area of primary protection includes the township of Upwey, parts of the Dandenong Ranges National Park, farmland, and other areas of bushland both private and public.

== Demographics ==
Upwey has a median age of 41 years. Children under 15 years account for 19.2% of the people in Upwey, and people aged over 65 years are 14.6%.

The majority of people living in Upwey were born in Australia (5,501 of the 6,818 or 80.7%). Other responses on the 2021 ABS census were England (5.2%), New Zealand (1.5%), Netherlands (0.9%), Germany (0.8%). Over 55% of people living in Upwey had both parents born in Australia (55.9%) and only one quarter had both parents born overseas (23%). For people who had their parents born overseas, the top countries listed were England, New Zealand, Netherlands and Germany. Over 91.2% of the residents of Upwey speak only English at home.

== Township ==
The main street has a wide variety of shops and services, instilling a traditional community village nature into an outer eastern suburb of Melbourne. Main Street consists of small retail outlets including a music shop, health care shop and milk bar as well as health care services including physiotherapy, osteopathy, dental and medical centre.

The predominant businesses are small cafes and restaurants providing a strong food culture to the township as these businesses are generally popular with a range of eat in and takeaway services with a prominent curbside dining culture.

In 1998, the first metropolitan and third ever Community Bank branch of Bendigo Bank was established in Upwey Main Street.

== Community spaces and public lands ==
There are substantial crown land and recreational reserves in Upwey. The Burrinja Cultural Centre on Glenfern Road, Forest Park Reserve, Ferny Creek Reserve (also known as the Hume St Drainage Reserve), Upwey South Recreational Reserve (including tennis courts), Upwey Recreational Reserve (including the bowls clubs) and Glenfern Valley Bushlands all form public reserves and recreational areas.

At Main Street, there is also a skate park and public halls. The public halls are located behind the retail outlets on Main Street. This group of public halls house community organisations including the Upwey Senior Community Centre, University of the Third Age, Upwey Angling Club, Upwey Scouts, and the Upwey Girl Guides. On the other side of Burwood Highway, the Upwey Community Centre also provides a location for community events, located opposite the Upwey RSL.

Other significant areas adjoining Upwey including Birdsland Reserve and the Dandenong Ranges National Park.

=== Children's playgrounds ===
There are children's playgrounds at Kooringal Playground on Kooringal Road, Burrinja Cultural Centre on Glenfern Road, Main Street Upwey, Wright Avenue Playground and at Upwey South Recreational Reserve.

=== Sporting clubs ===
Together with its neighbouring township Tecoma, Upwey has multiple sporting teams. The Upwey Tecoma Australian Rules football team (Upwey-Tecoma) competes in the Yarra Valley Mountain District Football League. Other local sports clubs are the Upwey-Tecoma Netball Club, Upwey Tecoma Bowls Club, Upwey Tecoma Cricket Club, and Upwey-Tecoma Tennis Club. Upwey South hosts the Upwey South Netball Club and the Upwey South Tennis Club.

The Upwey - Tecoma Community Recreational and Sporting Hub - known as the UT Crash - provides significant sporting facilities including the Andrew Petersen Pavilion located on the Upwey High School grounds.

== Places of worship ==
The Upwey Baptist Community Church, Holy Trinity Anglican Church, Tumbetin Spiritual Centre and Buddhist Discussion Centre are located in Upwey.

== Transport ==
Upwey is on the Belgrave Railway line. It has one railway station which is located adjacent to Main Street, Upwey's main shopping strip.

The bus route 693 which runs from Belgrave to Oakleigh via Burwood Highway and Ferntree Gully Road runs through the suburb.

The bus route 699 runs from Belgrave to Upwey and travels around Upwey and neighbouring suburbs.

The Ringwood-Belgrave Rail Trail passes through the Upwey township.

== Education ==
Upwey has two pre-schools called Upwey South Pre-School and Upwey Pre-School. Similarly, there are two primary schools in Upwey known as Upwey Primary School and Upwey South Primary School.

There is one secondary school in Upwey—Upwey High School, a government school for years 7–12.

== Significant properties ==
The designer and architect Alistair Knox designed two mudbrick houses in Upwey.

== Notable people ==
- Fred Birnstihl – AFL footballer
- Merle Greenwood - architect
- Lewis Hayes - AFL footballer
- Terry McDermott - actor
- Mark Opitz - record producer
- Rory Sloane - AFL footballer
- Shae Sloane – AFLW footballer
- Jason Vorherr - musician
- Fred Williams - artist
- Lazy Susan (drag queen) - drag queen and winner of Drag Race Down Under S4

== Natural environment and bushlands ==
The Glenfern Valley Bushlands are located on Glenfern Road. The Bushlands provide native remnant and rehabilitated forest. It descending from the ridge into the valley and a walk along Ferny Creek. Glenfern Valley Bushlands comprises 40 hectares or 100 acres, 35 km east of Melbourne. It is bounded on the south by Glenfern Road, on the west by New Road, the north boundary is Ferny Creek and the eastern boundary is 'Depot Track'. The land falls gently from south to north, with Grassy Forest and Herb Rich Foothill Forest on high ground to Riparian Forest at the creek line. It is in the Southern Fall Bioregion, and contains a large area of remnant vegetation. This land is now Crown Land under management by Department of Sustainability & Environment and the Shire of Yarra Ranges. It is being rehabilitated by Friends of Glenfern Valley Bushlands - a volunteer group of interested local people who weed and plant in the park on a monthly basis.

=== Creeks and waterways ===
Upwey has three main creeks, Ferny Creek, Monbulk Creek and Mast Gully Creek. These two creeks are part of the Corhanwarrabul catchment. The Corhanwarrabul catchment is part of the larger Dandenong Creek catchment, that flows into Port Phillip at Patterson Lakes. Ferny Creek starts in the Dandenong Ranges near the suburb of Sherbrooke. The headwaters are located in the Tremont/Ferny Creek region on Mt Dandenong of the Dandenong Ranges. It flows through the suburbs of Upwey, Upper Ferntree Gully, Ferntree Gully and Rowville. Ferny Creek and Monbulk Creek join in Rowville after which this combined waterway is known as Corhanwarrabul Creek. Monbulk Creek runs through the Lysterfield Valley to the south of the Glenfern Road ridge. The Corhanwarrabul Creek later becomes the Dandenong Creek at Police Road. Monbulk Creek flows through the suburbs of Belgrave, Upwey, Lysterfield, Ferntree Gully and Rowville with the headwaters rising in the Sherbrooke Forest National Park.

== See also ==
- Shire of Sherbrooke – Upwey was previously within this former local government area.
- Shire of Yarra Ranges – Upwey is within this local government area.
