= Shire of Sherbrooke =

Coordinates: 37°54′S 145°20′E

- Local government area
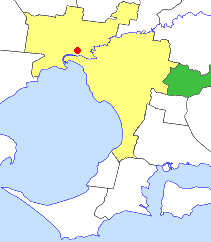
- Location in Victoria

- The Shire of Sherbrooke as at its dissolution in 1994
- Country: Australia
- State: Victoria
- Region: Outer Eastern Melbourne
- Established: 1889
- Council seat: Upwey

Area
  - Total: 191.66 km^{2} (74.00 sq mi)

Population
  - Total: 38,100 (1992)
  - Density: 198.79/km^{2} (514.9/sq mi)
- County: Evelyn, Mornington
LGAs around Shire of Sherbrooke
Knox	Lillydale	Upper Yarra
Knox	Shire of Sherbrooke	Upper Yarra
Berwick	Berwick	Pakenham

The Shire of Sherbrooke was a local government area about 40 kilometres (25 mi) east of Melbourne, the state capital of Victoria, Australia. The shire covered an area of 191.66 square kilometres (74.0 sq mi), and existed from 1963 until 1994. Its largest population centre was the town of Belgrave.

== History ==
Sherbrooke was originally the northwestern part of the Berwick Road District, which was incorporated on 24 October 1862, and became a shire on 12 May 1868. On 23 May 1889, the Scoresby Riding of the shire was severed, and incorporated as the Shire of Fern Tree Gully. With increasing urbanisation in suburbs closer to Melbourne, Fern Tree Gully in turn was splintered on 9 October 1963, the western part forming the City of Knox. The eastern part remained as Shire of Fern Tree Gully until the shire was renamed to the Shire of Sherbrooke a year later on 23 December 1964.

On 15 December 1994, the Shire of Sherbrooke was abolished, and along with the Shires of Lillydale, Healesville and Upper Yarra, was merged into the newly created Shire of Yarra Ranges. The districts around Emerald merged with the neighbouring Shire of Pakenham, into the newly created Shire of Cardinia, while Upper Ferntree Gully and Lysterfield were transferred to the City of Knox.

Council formerly met at the Shire Offices in Upwey. After the amalgamations, these offices became the Burrinja Cultural Centre.

== Wards ==
The Shire of Sherbrooke was divided into four ridings, each of which elected three councillors:

- Centre Riding
- East Riding
- Emerald Riding
- South Riding

== Suburbs and localities ==
- Avonsleigh
- Belgrave
- Belgrave Heights
- Belgrave South
- Clematis
- Emerald (shared with the Shire of Pakenham)
- Ferny Creek
- Kallista
- Lysterfield
- Macclesfield
- Menzies Creek
- Monbulk (shared with the Shire of Lillydale)
- Narre Warren East
- Olinda (shared with the Shire of Lillydale)
- Sassafras
- Selby
- Sherbrooke
- Tecoma
- The Patch
- Upper Ferntree Gully
- Upwey*

* Council seat.

== Population ==
Year	Population
1911	3,613
1933	9,171
1954	25,446
1958	30,360*
1961	37,587+
1966	17,651+
1971	20,484
1976	25,584
1981	29,935
1986	34,766
1991	36,554

* Estimate in the 1958 Victorian Year Book.
+ Knox severed in 1963 - Sherbrooke population in 1961 was 16,306, and combined population for 1966 is 65,242.
