= Tremont, Victoria =

Tremont
- Suburb
- Interactive map of Tremont
- Coordinates: 37.880°S 145.324°E
- Country: Australia
- State: Victoria
- City: Melbourne
- LGA: Shire of Yarra Ranges
- Location: 31 km (19 mi) from Melbourne; 7 km (4.3 mi) from Belgrave

Government
  - State electorate: Monbulk
  - Federal division: Casey

Area
  - Total: 5 km^{2} (1.9 sq mi)
- Elevation: 491 m (1,611 ft)

Population
  - Total: 69 (2021 census)
  - Density: 13.8/km^{2} (36/sq mi)
- Postcode: 3785
Suburbs around Tremont
Boronia	The Basin	Sassafras
Ferntree Gully	Tremont	Ferny Creek
Upper Ferntree Gully	Upper Ferntree Gully	Upwey

Tremont is a suburb in Melbourne, Victoria, Australia, 31 km east of Melbourne's central business district, located within the Shire of Yarra Ranges local government area. Tremont recorded a population of 69 at the 2021 census.

Almost the entire suburban area is within the Dandenong Ranges National Park.

The Post Office opened on 16 July 1913, was known as Dunstan's until 1919, and closed in 1977.

Tremont was affected by the Dandenong Ranges fire of 22 January 1997.
