= The Basin Music Festival =

Annual festival near Melbourne, Australia

Coordinates: 37°51′36″S 145°18′50″E

- Genre: Rock, Blues, Jazz, Country, World, Folk, etc...
- Dates: 3rd or 4th weekend in March
- Locations: Cnr Forest Rd & Mountain Hwy. The Basin, Victoria, Australia
- Years active: March 2005-present
- Website: Official website

The Basin Music Festival is held every March in the small fringe suburb/village of The Basin at the foot of Mount Dandenong, on the eastern outskirts of Melbourne, Australia. The first festival took place in March 2005.

Growing out of the music found in the community, the non-profit, volunteer-run festival presents an eclectic collection of musical styles, including but not limited to rock, jazz, blues, folk, country and world music. The musical styles are decided by the interests and talents found throughout the outer eastern suburbs of Melbourne and the Dandenong Ranges.

In addition to the music performed in seven indoor venues (only two of which require paid admission) and The Basin Pavilion (a free outdoor stage in the park), the festival includes market stalls and food stalls, exhibitions and displays by community groups and organisations (such as the local Scouts and fire brigade), with activities for children and a very laid-back country village atmosphere.
