= Merle Greenwood =

New Zealand architect

- Born: Alice Marion Merle Victoria Greenwood; 1900; Hobart, Australia
- Died: 1990 (aged 89–90)
- Education: University of Auckland
- Occupation: Architect

Alice Marion Merle Victoria Greenwood (1900 – 1990) was an Australian-born New Zealand architect. She was the first woman to graduate with a bachelor's degree in architecture from a New Zealand university, and the first woman to be employed as an architect in the New Zealand public service.

== Biography ==
Greenwood was born in Hobart, Australia, the daughter of an Anglican minister. The family lived in various locations around the Pacific and arrived in New Zealand in 1913, settling in Auckland. She attended a small private girls' school and received a scholarship for daughters of clergy, which enabled her to enrol at university. From 1927 to 1932, she studied architecture full-time at the University of Auckland. Her final year thesis design was for a group of buildings in an Italian style.

Greenwood graduated in 1933, becoming the first woman to complete the five-year degree. Her graduation was reported in the New Zealand Herald under the headline "Girl As Architect". The Auckland Lyceum Club held a special event to celebrate her graduation, and invited author Jane Mander and Auckland's first woman barrister, Julia Holloway, to mark the occasion.

As Greenwood graduated during the Great Depression, when paid employment was difficult to find, she initially took an unpaid position at architectural firm Gummer and Ford. She also worked in the office of Auckland architect Horace Massey and assisted with the design of the Heard's factory in Parnell. In 1935, Greenwood moved to Dannevirke for work and then in 1937 to Wellington. In Wellington, she began as an architectural draughtswoman for the Department of Housing Construction and was later promoted to the position of architect. She worked on designing state houses, and was the first woman to be employed as an architect in the New Zealand public service.

In 1943, Greenwood was seconded to the Department of Health. In the following year she resigned and moved to Melbourne. She continued to practise as an architect there, including designing her own home in Upwey. She later returned to New Zealand.

== Personal life ==
Greenwood married her cousin, accountant Robert Sampson, in Melbourne in 1945. The couple had no children. Greenwood's husband died in 1962 and she subsequently returned to New Zealand.
