= Gilderoy, Victoria =

Gilderoy
- Town
- Coordinates: 37°51′S 145°43′E
- Country: Australia
- State: Victoria
- LGA: Shire of Yarra Ranges

Government
  - State electorate: Eildon
  - Federal division: McEwen

Population
  - Total: 62 (2021 census)
- Postcode: 3797

Gilderoy is a locality in Victoria, Australia, on the Yarra Junction Noojee Road to the west of Powelltown, located within the Shire of Yarra Ranges local government area. Gilderoy recorded a population of 62 at the 2021 census.

== History ==
Gilderoy Post Office opened in 1902 and closed in 1976.
