= Upper Ferntree Gully =

- Suburb
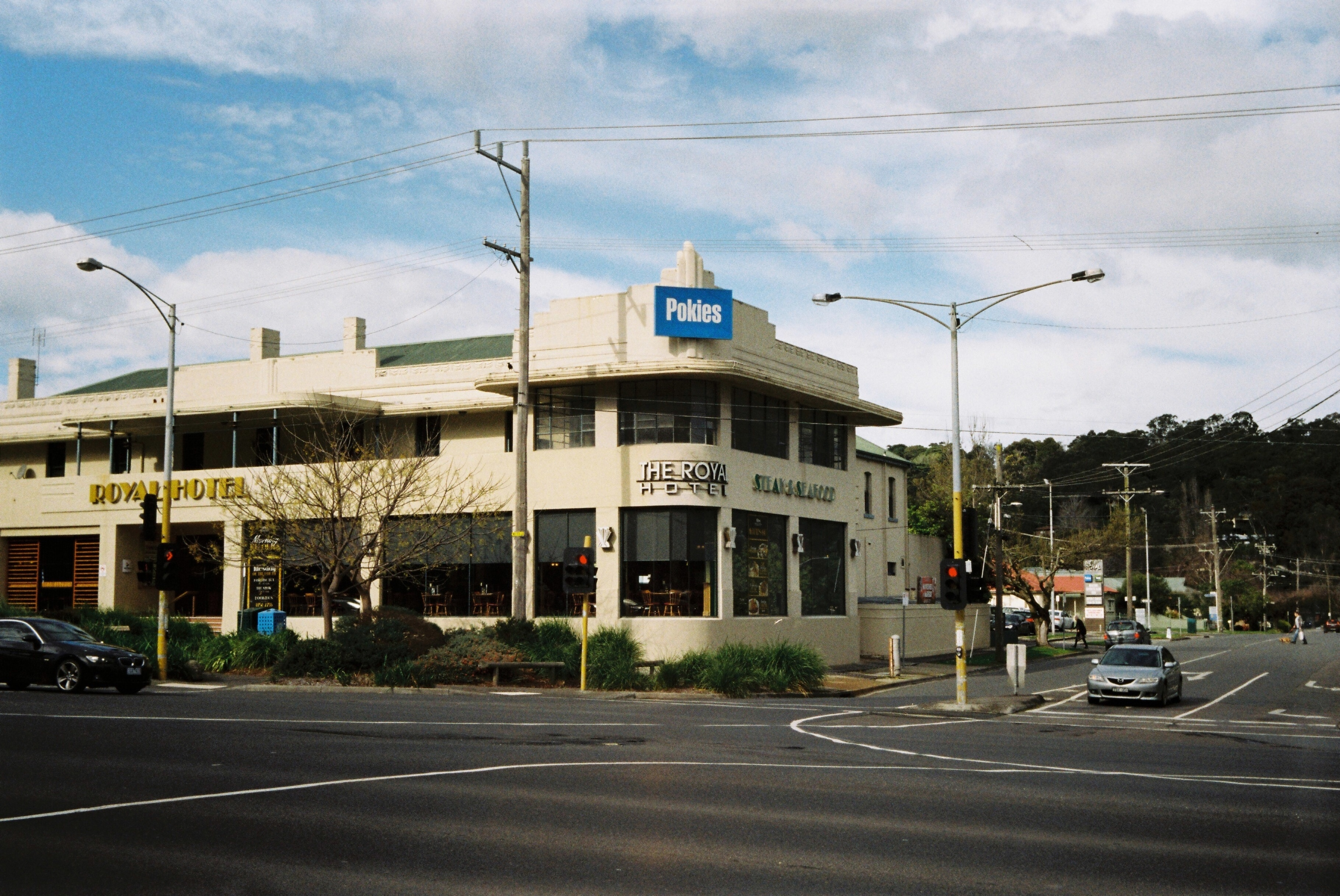
- The Royal Hotel, Upper Ferntree Gully

- Interactive map of Upper Ferntree Gully
- Coordinates: 37.895°S 145.310°E
- Country: Australia
- State: Victoria
- City: Melbourne
- LGAs: City of Knox; Shire of Yarra Ranges
- Location: 32 km (20 mi) from Melbourne

Government
  - State electorate: Monbulk
  - Federal divisions: Aston; Casey

Area
  - Total: 3 km^{2} (1.2 sq mi)
- Elevation: 126 m (413 ft)

Population
  - Total: 3,417 (2021 census)
  - Density: 1,140/km^{2} (2,900/sq mi)
- Postcode: 3156
Suburbs around Upper Ferntree Gully
Ferntree Gully	Tremont	Tremont
Ferntree Gully	Upper Ferntree Gully	Upwey
Lysterfield	Lysterfield	Upwey

Upper Ferntree Gully is a suburb of Melbourne, Victoria, Australia, 32 km east of Melbourne's Central Business District, located within the City of Knox and Shire of Yarra Ranges local government areas. Upper Ferntree Gully recorded a population of 3,417 at the 2021 census.

== History ==
Upper Ferntree Gully was a farming area in its early days and formed the end of the electric train line from Melbourne. Holiday makers and day trippers would then make their way by various means of transport to holiday and day tripper locations in "the hills". Many Melburnians up to (at least) the 1930s also holidayed in cottages in Upper Ferntree Gully.

Coonara House in Willow Road is the oldest building in Upper Ferntree Gully, ahead of The Royal Hotel. Coonara House was the farm house for the farm land that is now Kings Park reserve, originally owned by the Inverno family, the 50 acre property was compulsorily acquired by the Council during council member Cyril King's time, 16 acres was given to the education board and became upper Ferntree gully Tec. Some historic buildings and sites have been lost over the years—including the original Primary School (which was nestled into the National Park, near the current Country Fire Authority station), the Talaskia tearooms (corner of Rollings Road and Burwood Highway—many original architectural features were lost during renovations in the 1990s), the cycling velodrome (a bitumen track that was located behind St Joseph's College (Brenock Park) on the border of Upper Ferntree Gully and Ferntree Gully—this was used as part of The Sun newspaper's cycling competition), the Progress Hall (adjacent to Martin's Smash Repairs) and Kayser factory (Rose Street). The old bakery in Rose Street is home to the 1812 Amateur Theatre Group.

The suburb of Upper Ferntree Gully is often referred to by residents simply as Upper Gully. Many years ago, Ferntree Gully was known as Lower Ferntree Gully—there was a Lower Gully and an Upper Gully. Upper Ferntree Gully has been part of the Shire Fern Tree Gully, Shire of Sherbrooke, Yarra Ranges Shire (after the realignment of municipal boundaries), but now most of it is in the City of Knox.

== Natural features ==
Upper Ferntree Gully is home to Ferntree Gully Park, part of the Dandenong Ranges National Park) and Parks Victoria's Education Centre. The park boasts, in addition to the natural environment, the "1,000 steps". These steps were laid in commemoration of the Kokoda Trail (in World War II the Kokoda Track was a field of action for Australian soldiers in Papua New Guinea). Kings Park (located in Willow Road and alongside Ferntree Gully and Ferny creeks) is home to football, cricket, athletics and baseball. Talaskia reserve home to cricket, junior football. Gilmour Park (the preece-inct) is also the location of cricket. This is Melbourne Water's Retarding Basin (along Ferny Creek) and close to Sherbrooke Archery Club.

== Church and community groups ==
There are a number of groups providing for the local community—Country Fire Authority, Talaksia Scout Group, St Thomas' Anglican Church, Upper Ferntree Gully Seventh-day Adventist Church, International Women's Group (Coonara House) and Coonara Community House.

== Sports and entertainment ==
There are a number of sporting organizations based in Upper Ferntree Gully—Upper Ferntree Gully Kings Football Club competing in the Eastern Football League and the Cricket Club (Kings Park), Upwey Tecoma Junior Football Club (Talaskia Road), St John's Tecoma Cricket Club (Talaskia Road), Sherbrooke Little Athletic Centre (Kings Park), Upwey/Ferntree Gully Baseball Club (Kings Park), Kenlaural Dance Centre and the 1812 Amateur Theatre group.

== Education ==
There is a government primary school (Upper Ferntree Gully Primary school) which is located on Talaskia Road. There was a Prep – Year 6 community school (Coonara Community School).

== Health and aged care ==
The Angliss Hospital (formerly known as the William Angliss Hospital) was established in 1939 and is located in Albert Street and Talaskia Road, Upper Ferntree Gully. Chandler House—Eastern Health Child and Adolescent Mental Health Service—is located nearby in Albert Street (and was used as a bush nursing hospital prior to the opening of the Angliss Hospital in its current location from 1958). There are also a number of medical consulting rooms in the vicinity of the hospital. Willowbrooke aged care facility is located in Willow Road, Menarock nursing home Tarana street, Upper Ferntree Gully. In terms of animal health, Upper Ferntree Gully also has a veterinary hospital.

== Retail ==
There are limited retail outlets (mainly food, hairdressing, banking, chemist, post office and repair services) in Upper Ferntree Gully, generally located along the main thoroughfare (Burwood Highway). Ferntree Plaza is the largest retail centre in Upper Ferntree Gully.

In May, 2021 a fire burnt through the suburb's second Indian restaurant which was temporarily closed for repairs. CFA and Police units responding initially received word that the fire was, "out the back of the Royal Hotel" which led to dozens of vehicles rushing to the scene.

Upper Ferntree Gully also has a number of used car yards.

== Transport ==
Upper Ferntree Gully has a railway station on Burwood Highway. There are train stabling facilities at Upper Ferntree Gully and a terminus for some services. The following bus routes also service the suburb:

- 688 Croydon – Upper Ferntree Gully via Mt Dandenong, Olinda, Tremont (every day). Operated by Ventura Bus Lines
- 693 Belgrave – Oakleigh via Upwey RS, Upper Ferntree Gully RS, Ferntree Gully RS, Brandon Park SC (every day). Operated by Ventura Bus Lines
- 732 Box Hill – Upper Ferntree Gully via Vermont South, Knox City SC (every day). Operated by Ventura Bus Lines.

== Notable people ==
- Steve Irwin – Australian zookeeper, television personality, wildlife expert, environmentalist and conservationist
- Shane Warne – cricketer born in Upper Ferntree Gully at the Angliss Hospital in September 13th 1969
