= Ferny Creek =

- Suburb
- Interactive map of Ferny Creek
- Coordinates: 37.878°S 145.335°E
- Country: Australia
- State: Victoria
- City: Melbourne
- LGA: Shire of Yarra Ranges
- Location: 43 km (27 mi) from Melbourne; 20 km (12 mi) from Lilydale; 5 km (3.1 mi) from Belgrave

Government
  - State electorate: Monbulk
  - Federal division: Casey

Area
  - Total: 5.3 km^{2} (2.0 sq mi)

Population
  - Total: 1,524 (2021 census)
  - Density: 287.5/km^{2} (745/sq mi)
- Postcode: 3786
Suburbs around Ferny Creek
	Dandenong Ranges	Sassafras
Tremont	Ferny Creek	Dandenong Ranges
Upper Ferntree Gully	Upwey	Tecoma

Ferny Creek is a suburb in Melbourne, Victoria, Australia, 33 km south-east of Melbourne's central business district, located within the Shire of Yarra Ranges local government area. Ferny Creek recorded a population of 1,524 at the 2021 census.

The suburb is built around and to the south of Dunns Hill (height 561m) with most of Ferny Creek lying between 400 and 500 metres above sea level. It is named after Ferny Creek, a small stream which originates to the south of Dunns Hill in the centre of the suburb.

The suburb of Ferny Creek is largely surrounded by conservation zones and national parks, with the Dandenong Ranges national park on its northern and western sides, the Upwey habitat corridor to the south and Sherbrooke Forest to the east.

== History ==
For at least 35,000 years, the Wurundjeri people have been the traditional custodians of the land within the Yarra Ranges including Ferny Creek. Europeans settlers established themselves there from the 1830s, pursuing gold along the rivers and carving out productive agricultural lands. Later prominent Melbourne figures built weekend cottages in the region. Ferny Creek is well known for its established European gardens, and beautiful range of native fauna and flora. The Post Office opened around August 1904 as One Tree Hill, and was subsequently renamed Ferny Creek. In 1964, Raynor Johnson bought land at Ferny Creek and built Santiniketan Lodge, which became the headquarters of The Family.

== Flora and biodiversity ==
Ferny Creek contains a wide range of microclimates and aspects, and as a result the flora is similar to that of the larger Dandenong Ranges as a whole. The Dandenong Ranges National park including Sherbrooke Forest, contains large areas of native vegetation and is dominated by a mix of wet and dry Sclerophyll forests. There are small pockets of wet temperate rainforest in the deeper gullies (bordering Sherbrooke, Mast Gully and Ferny Creeks).

Weeds remain a significant threat to biodiversity, with significant infestations of Ivy, onion weed, tradescantia and holly. A number of conservation groups are active in the local area including the Friends of Ferny Creek and Friends of Sherbrooke Forest .

Outside of the conservation zones and national park, Ferny Creek is largely covered by exotic vegetation with remnant native trees.

== Public Land ==
Dandenong Ranges National Park and Ferny Creek Recreation Reserve.

Dandenong Ranges National park is managed primary for conservation purposes and secondarily for recreation. However Ferny Creek Reserve has mainly recreational function. Ferny Creek Reserve is maintained by local residents on behalf of the Department of Sustainability and Environment (DSE), and contains a Bureau of Meteorology weather station.

== The town today ==
While a suburb of Melbourne, extensive parks, large residential blocks and the lack of commercial activity means that Ferny Creek maintains a rural character.

There are a number of bed and breakfast located in Ferny Creek, Ferny Creek Primary School and a General Store. There is also a Country Fire Authority (CFA) fire station, (Sassafras-Ferny Creek Fire Brigade), Scout group (1st Ferny Creek), tennis club, recreation reserve and plant nursery, as well as a World War One Memorial. Ferny Creek has a number of homes of note, particularly around Kallamondah and Mount Dandenong Tourist Roads.

Ferny Creek is home to a popular attraction known as "The Thousand Steps" - a bushwalking track built by Australian Army Engineers that runs through the Ferntree Gully National Park and provides a fitness challenge to those who attempt it. The steps begin at the bottom of the hill in Upper Ferntree Gully and the top of the steps being located at Ferny Creek near One Tree Hill. The track is a minute representation of the ordeals suffered by the Australian Army in Kokoda during World War Two.

Together with its neighbouring township Olinda Ferny Creek has an Australian Rules football team (Olinda-Ferny Creek) competing in the Yarra Valley Mountain District Football League.

== Climate ==
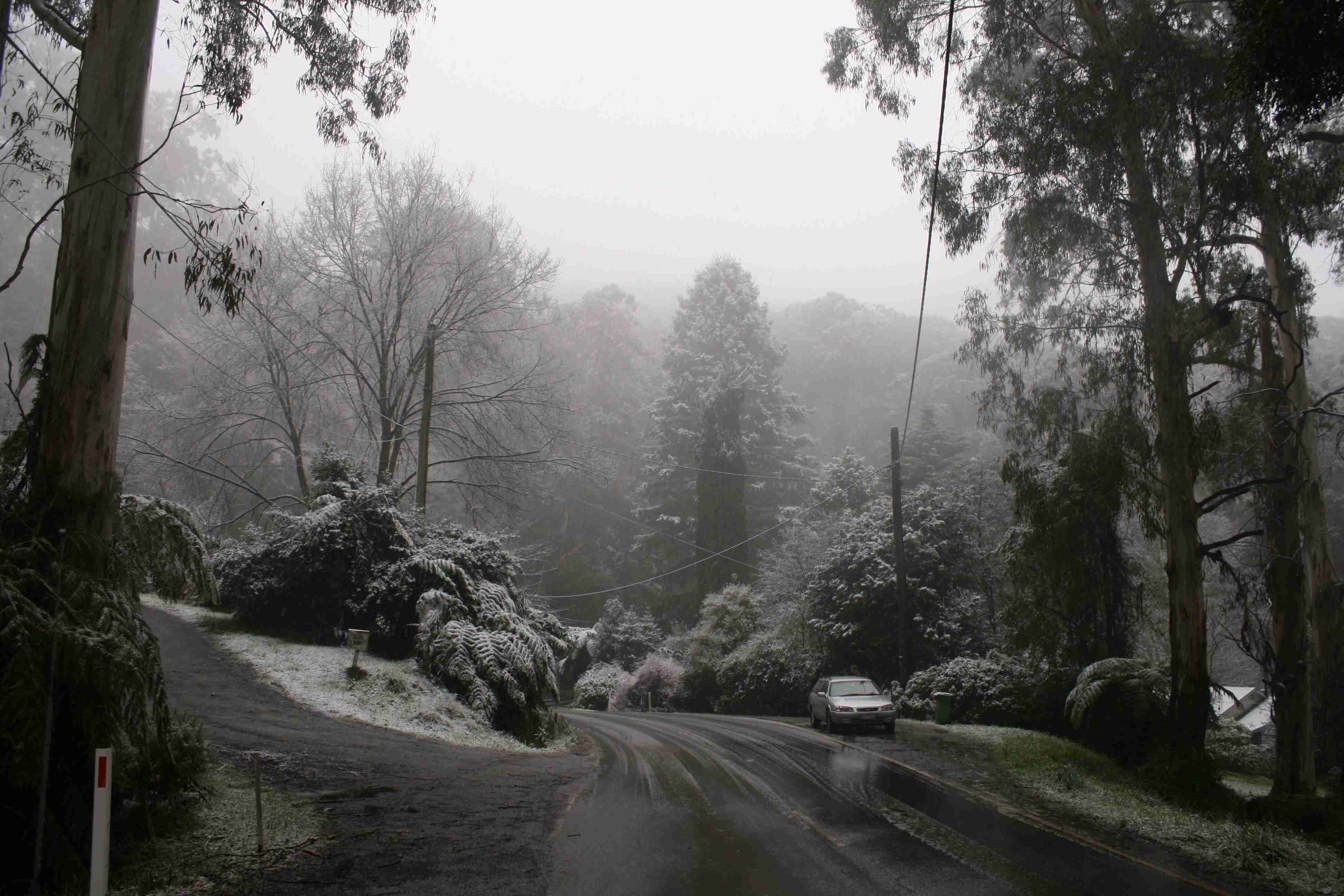
Snow in Ferny Creek, Victoria, Australia, 10 August 2008

Ferny Creek's climate is cool and wet, with temperature extremes rare due to the proximity of Port Phillip Bay and Bass Strait. Rainfall is fairly uniform through the year, tending to peak between April and October with lower rainfall during the months of January and February. The mean annual rainfall is between 1100 and 1500 mm, increasing with elevation and from west to east. The elevation means that temperatures are typically 3 to 5 °C cooler than the lower suburbs of Melbourne, to the west of Ferny Creek.

As a result of its elevation snow typically falls one or two times a year, mostly between the months of June and October. A rare summer snow occurred on Christmas Day 2006 . The local region has experienced substantial warming in recent decades and heavy snowfalls which were once common have become rare. The last significant snowfall to affect Ferny Creek was on 10 August 2008 when as much as 15 cm of snow fell around Dunns Hill. A Bureau of Meteorology weather station sits at an elevation of 513 m in the Ferny Creek Reserve.

Climate data for Ferny Creek, Victoria
Month	Jan	Feb	Mar	Apr	May	Jun	Jul	Aug	Sep	Oct	Nov	Dec	Year
Record high °C (°F)	40.2 (104.4)	41.8 (107.2)	35.7 (96.3)	29.4 (84.9)	22.9 (73.2)	18.1 (64.6)	17.9 (64.2)	20.4 (68.7)	24.2 (75.6)	34.2 (93.6)	33.9 (93.0)	37.0 (98.6)	41.8 (107.2)
Mean daily maximum °C (°F)	22.3 (72.1)	22.3 (72.1)	19.9 (67.8)	16.0 (60.8)	12.3 (54.1)	9.6 (49.3)	9.0 (48.2)	10.3 (50.5)	12.5 (54.5)	15.2 (59.4)	18.0 (64.4)	19.9 (67.8)	15.6 (60.1)
Mean daily minimum °C (°F)	12.1 (53.8)	12.7 (54.9)	11.1 (52.0)	9.4 (48.9)	7.5 (45.5)	5.7 (42.3)	4.9 (40.8)	5.1 (41.2)	6.0 (42.8)	7.2 (45.0)	9.1 (48.4)	10.2 (50.4)	8.4 (47.1)
Record low °C (°F)	4.7 (40.5)	5.1 (41.2)	3.8 (38.8)	1.4 (34.5)	0.6 (33.1)	0.2 (32.4)	−0.1 (31.8)	−0.8 (30.6)	−0.6 (30.9)	0.3 (32.5)	1.5 (34.7)	2.2 (36.0)	−0.8 (30.6)
Average rainfall mm (inches)	67.9 (2.67)	80.4 (3.17)	76.7 (3.02)	94.7 (3.73)	89.9 (3.54)	90.4 (3.56)	85.1 (3.35)	89.1 (3.51)	92.0 (3.62)	94.7 (3.73)	105.9 (4.17)	88.8 (3.50)	1,046.1 (41.19)
Average rainy days (≥ 0.1 mm)	11.8	10.4	13.9	14.7	15.2	16.7	18.2	18.1	17.6	17.4	15.5	13.6	183.1
Average afternoon relative humidity (%)	58	58	61	69	79	84	82	75	70	65	64	60	69

== Bushfires ==
Ferny Creek was among the suburbs affected by a series of deliberately lit fires in the Dandenong Ranges on 21 January 1997, and has been affected by numerous bushfires throughout settlement.

The community of Ferny Creek is close and resilient, as proved in its recovery from the fires that destroyed 42 homes and killed three local residents (Genevieve Erin, Graham and Jenny Lindroth). The fires were deliberately lit in bushland below the settlement on Tuesday 21 January 1997, and in the extreme conditions of that day, raced up the steep slopes and were burning gardens and property before most residents were even aware of a problem. After the bushfires the small community rallied together for a fundraising event held at the local Ferny Creek Reserve and Tennis Club. Money was raised for families who lost their houses and personal items in the devastation.

Since that time, residents have focused their efforts on making responsible choices when considering their fire safety plans and in addition to having a significantly higher than average membership rate of CFA's Community Fire Guard program, and a pro-active approach to keeping properties prepared, the Ferny Creek Bushfire Alert System was installed to provide a siren signal to alert residents to the possibility of a threat to their safety. Residents are educated to respond appropriately to the siren by simply seeking further information via another source (radio, internet, phone tree, scanner, television, personal investigation etc.). It is not a signal to evacuate. The Alert System is a unique co-operative project between residents, Shire of Yarra Ranges, CFA, Victoria Police, Dept of Justice and Parks Victoria.

== Education ==
There is one primary school located in this area called "Ferny Creek Primary School". The school was established in 1895 and as of 2018 has 202 students; 109 boys and 93 girls.
