= Fred Birnstihl =

Australian rules footballer (1904–1983)

Personal information
- Full name: Frederick George Birnstihl
- Born: 16 October 1904; Heidelberg, Grand Duchy of Baden, German Empire
- Died: 12 July 1983 (aged 78); Upwey, Victoria
- Original team: Leopold

Playing career^{1}
Years	Club	Games (Goals)
1927	Footscray	2 (0)
- ^{1} Playing statistics correct to the end of 1927.

Frederick George Birnstihl (16 October 1904 – 12 July 1983) was an Australian rules footballer who played with Footscray in the Victorian Football League (VFL).
