= Fernshaw =

Fernshaw Victoria
- Coordinates: 37°38′S 145°43′E
- Population: 0 (2021 census)
- Postcode(s): 3778
- LGA(s): Shire of Yarra Ranges
- State electorate(s): Eildon
- Federal division(s): McEwen

Fernshaw is a locality in Victoria, Australia, on Acheron Way between Marysville to the north and Warburton to the south, located within the Shire of Yarra Ranges local government area.

== History ==
Fernshawe Post Office opened on 19 September 1865 and closed in 1890.
