= Yarra Ranges Shire =

Coordinates: 37°44′S 145°41′E

Shire of Yarra Ranges
- Local government area
- Location in Victoria

- Interactive map of Shire of Yarra Ranges
- Country: Australia
- State: Victoria
- Region: Greater Melbourne
- Established: 15 December 1994
- Council seat: Lilydale

Government
  - Mayor: Richard Higgins
  - State electorates: Croydon; Eildon; Evelyn; Monbulk; Warrandyte
  - Federal division: Casey

Area
  - Total: 2,468 km^{2} (953 sq mi)

Population
  - Total: 158,173 (2018) (45th)
  - Density: 64.090/km^{2} (165.99/sq mi)
- Website: Shire of Yarra Ranges
LGAs around Shire of Yarra Ranges
Nillumbik Manningham	Murrindindi	Mansfield
Maroondah	Shire of Yarra Ranges	Baw Baw
Knox	Casey	Cardinia

The Shire of Yarra Ranges, also known as Yarra Ranges Council, is a local government area in Victoria, Australia, located in the outer eastern and northeastern suburbs of Melbourne extending into the Yarra Valley and Dandenong Ranges. It has an area of 2,468 square kilometres (953 sq mi), of which 3% is classified as urban. In June 2018, it had a population of 158,173.

== History ==
Prior to European settlement, the land within and beyond the Yarra Ranges was occupied by the Wurundjeri people.

European settlement was established from the 1830s with settlers engaging in agriculture and gold mining.

The Shire of Yarra Ranges was formed on 15 December 1994 by the merger of parts of the Shire of Sherbrooke, Shire of Lillydale, Shire of Healesville and Shire of Upper Yarra.

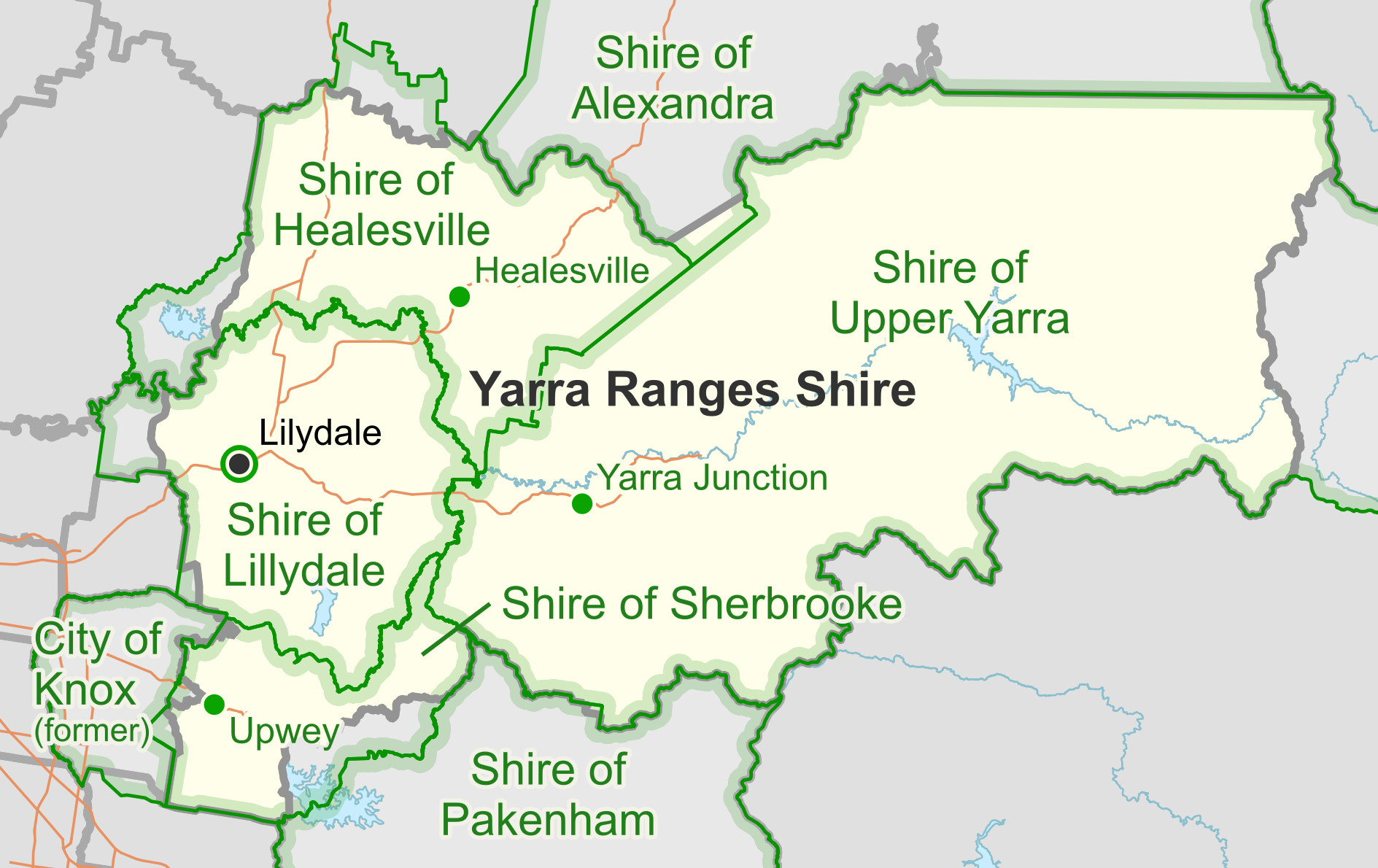
Yarra Ranges Shire's predecessor LGAs (green) as they were in 1994. The administrative centres of the former LGAs are marked by green dots.

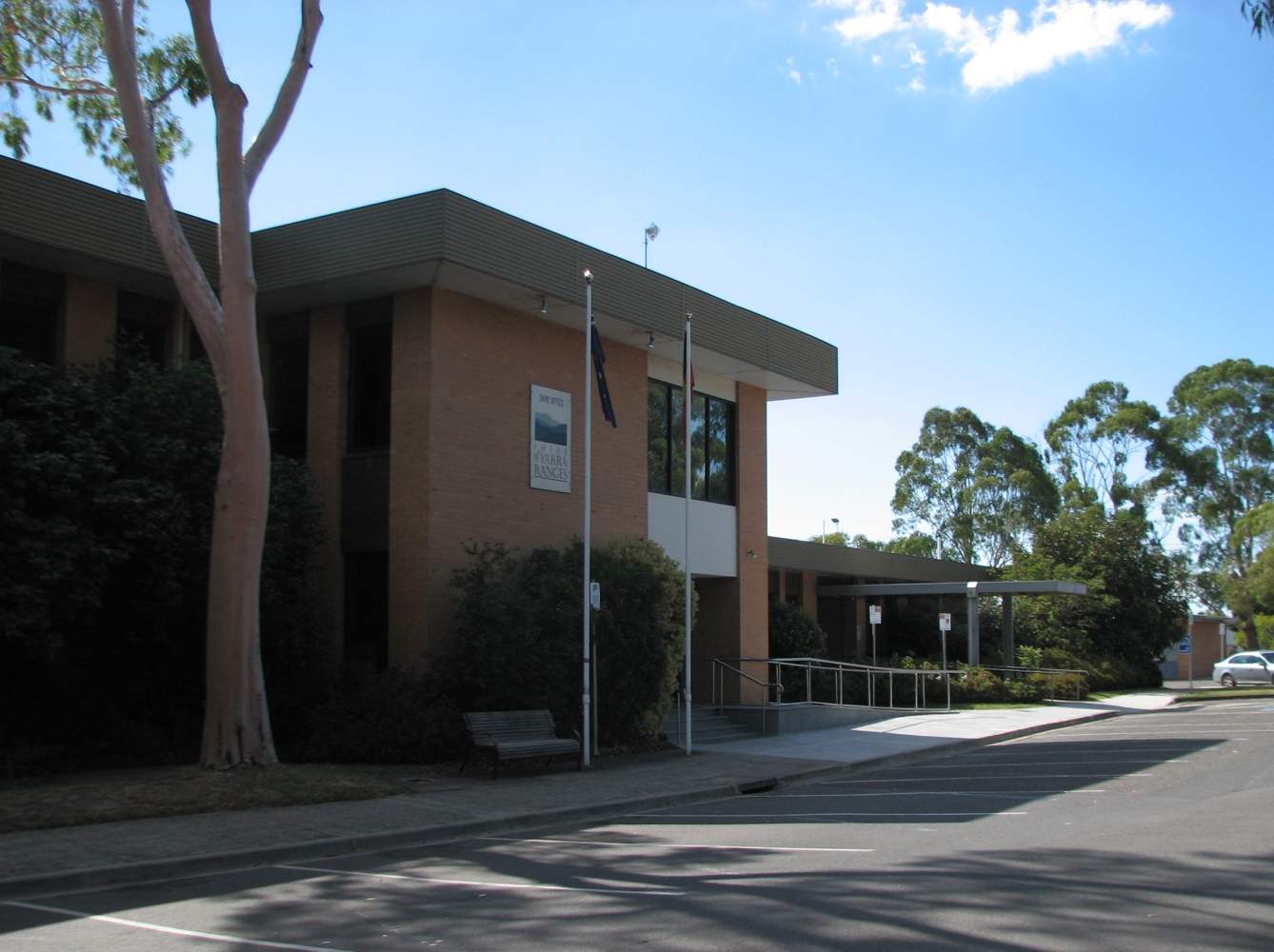
Shire Offices, Lilydale (building prior to 2010s-20s overhaul and extension)

== Council ==
Yarra Ranges is divided into nine wards, each of which elects one councillor for a period of four years.

=== Wards ===
2020 and 2024 ward boundaries. Expand the map and click on a ward to see the ward name
- Billanook Ward, named after the Wurundjeri name for the region and pioneered by explorer Robert Hoddle
- Chandler Ward, named after a pioneering family
- Chirnside Ward, named after George Chirnside, a Mooroolbark settler and owner of the Werribee Park Mansion
- Lyster Ward, named after William Saurin Lyster, an impresario who had a dairy farm in the area
- Melba Ward, named after opera singer Dame Nellie Melba
- O'Shannassy Ward, named after O'Shannassy River and reservoir, in turn named after John O'Shanassy (sic.), Premier of Victoria in the mid-1800s
- Ryrie Ward, named after William Ryrie who planted the first vineyards in the area
- Streeton Ward, named after Sir Arthur Streeton, a painter who lived in Olinda
- Walling Ward, named after landscape designer Edna Walling

=== Current composition ===
Ward	Suburbs	Party	Councillor	Elected	Notes
Billanook	Lilydale, Mt Evelyn, Wandin North	Independent	Tim Heenan	2016	
Chandler	Kalorama, Macclesfield, Monbulk, Seville, Silvan, Wandin, Olinda (part), Montrose (part), Mt Evelyn (part)	Independent Liberal	Gareth Ward	2024	Deputy Mayor
Chirnside	Chirnside Park, Mooroolbark	Independent	Richard Higgins	2016	Mayor
Lyster	Belgrave, Belgrave Heights, Belgrave South, Kallista, Lysterfield, Menzies Creek, Narre Warren East, Selby, Sherbrooke, Tecoma, The Patch	Independent	Peter Mcilwain	2024	
Melba	Lilydale, Mooroolbark	Independent Liberal	Mitch Mazzarella	2024	
O'Shannassy	Don Valley, Gladysdale, Hoddles Creek, Launching Place, McMahons Creek, Millgrove, Powelltown, Reefton, Warburton, Wesburn, Woori Yallock, Yarra Junction, Yellingbo	Independent National	Jim Child	2012	
Ryrie	Badger Creek, Chum Creek, Coldstream, Dixon's Creek, Gruyere, Healesville, Steels Creek, Tarrawarra, Yarra Glen, Yering	Independent	Fiona McAllister	2012	
Streeton	Ferny Creek, Montrose, Mt Dandenong, Olinda, Sassafras, Tremont, Upper Ferntree Gully, Upwey	Independent	Jeff Marriott	2024	
Walling	Kilsyth, Mooroolbark, Montrose	Independent	Len Cox	1982 (Note: First elected to Shire of Lillydale before council amalgamations in 1994.)	

== Election results ==
=== 2024 ===
2024 Victorian local elections: Yarra Ranges
Party	Votes	%	Swing	Seats	Change
Independent	48,551	67.74	–9.31	6	▼2
Independent Liberal	10,385	14.49	+7.44	2	▲2
Independent Libertarian	5,127	7.15	+6.13	0	Steady
Independent National	4,360	6.08	–0.80	1	Steady
Greens	1,083	1.51	–0.44	0	Steady
Animal Justice	791	1.10	+1.10	0	Steady
Independent Labor	762	1.06	–3.73	0	Steady
Victorian Socialists	618	0.86	+0.86	0	Steady
Formal votes	71,677	95.97			
Informal votes	3,012	4.03			
Total	74,689	100.00		9	Steady
Registered voters / turnout	116,724 (Note: This number is inclusive of the total number of enrolled voters across all wards.)	83.02 (Note: This number does not include enrolled voters from uncontested wards. It is the total turnout for contested wards only.)			

== Townships and localities ==
The shire had a population of 156,068 at the 2021 census, an increase from 149,537 recorded at the 2016 census.

Population
Locality	2016	2021
Badger Creek	1,563	1,610
Beenak	25	17
Belgrave	3,929	3,894
Belgrave Heights	1,360	1,398
Belgrave South	1,645	1,670
Big Pats Creek	73	60
Cambarville	0	0
Chirnside Park	9,872	11,779
Chum Creek	983	981
Coldstream	2,164	2,199
Dixons Creek	334	344
Don Valley	576	586
East Warburton	864	906
Emerald^	5,778	5,890
Fernshaw	0	0
Ferny Creek	1,518	1,524
Gilderoy	65	62
Gladysdale	444	423
Gruyere	946	966
Healesville	7,461	7,589
Hoddles Creek	627	676
Kallista	1,437	1,418
Kalorama	1,239	1,277
Kilsyth^	10,891	11,699
Launching Place	2,394	2,495
Lilydale	16,531	17,348
Lysterfield^	6,663	6,681
Macclesfield	851	878
Matlock^	4	7
McMahons Creek	125	143
Menzies Creek^	998	966
Millgrove	1,653	1,666
Monbulk	3,577	3,651
Montrose	6,761	6,900
Mooroolbark	21,967	23,059
Mount Dandenong	1,251	1,271
Mount Evelyn	9,702	9,799
Mount Toolebewong	140	119
Narre Warren East	419	434
Olinda	1,738	1,773
Powelltown	217	214
Reefton	59	102
Sassafras^	1,061	970
Selby	1,652	1,626
Seville	2,378	2,559
Seville East	797	837
Sherbrooke	265	294
Silvan	1,246	1,323
Steels Creek	225	276
Tarrawarra	78	81
Tecoma	2,082	2,064
The Patch	1,065	1,046
Three Bridges	199	188
Toolangi^	344	366
Toorongo^	0	0
Tremont	77	69
Upper Ferntree Gully^	3,416	3,417
Upwey	6,652	6,818
Wandin East	431	408
Wandin North	3,051	3,132
Warburton	2,012	2,020
Wesburn	1,019	1,052
Wonga Park^	3,796	3,843
Woori Yallock	2,913	2,964
Yarra Glen	2,869	3,012
Yarra Junction	2,549	2,875
Yellingbo	534	582
Yering	115	138

^ - Territory divided with another LGA

== Major thoroughfares ==
Pre-2010 Council logo

- Burwood Highway (State Route 26)
- Canterbury Road/Swansea Road/Anderson Street (south) (State Route 32 / C401) (briefly merges with C415 before turning to SR32 (and SR22 respectively))
- Maroondah Highway (State Route 34 / B300)
- Belgrave-Hallam Road/Monbulk Road/Hereford Road (C404) (briefly merges with C406)
- Belgrave Road (State Route 26)
- Olinda-Monbulk Road/Emerald Monbulk Road
- Warburton Highway (B380)
- Healesville- Koo Wee Rup Road (C411)
- Mount Dandenong (Tourist) Road (State Route 22 / C415)
