= Big Pats Creek =

- Town
- Coordinates: 37°46′S 145°46′E
- Country: Australia
- State: Victoria
- LGA: Shire of Yarra Ranges

Government
  - State electorate: Eildon
  - Federal division: Casey

Population
  - Total: 60 (2021 census)
- Postcode: 3799

Big Pats Creek is a locality in Victoria, Australia to the south of Woods Point Road beyond Warburton, located within the Shire of Yarra Ranges local government area. Big Pats Creek recorded a population of 60 at the 2021 census.

== History ==
Big Pats Creek Post Office opened on 21 November 1913 and closed in 1965.
