= The Basin, Victoria =

The Basin
- Suburb
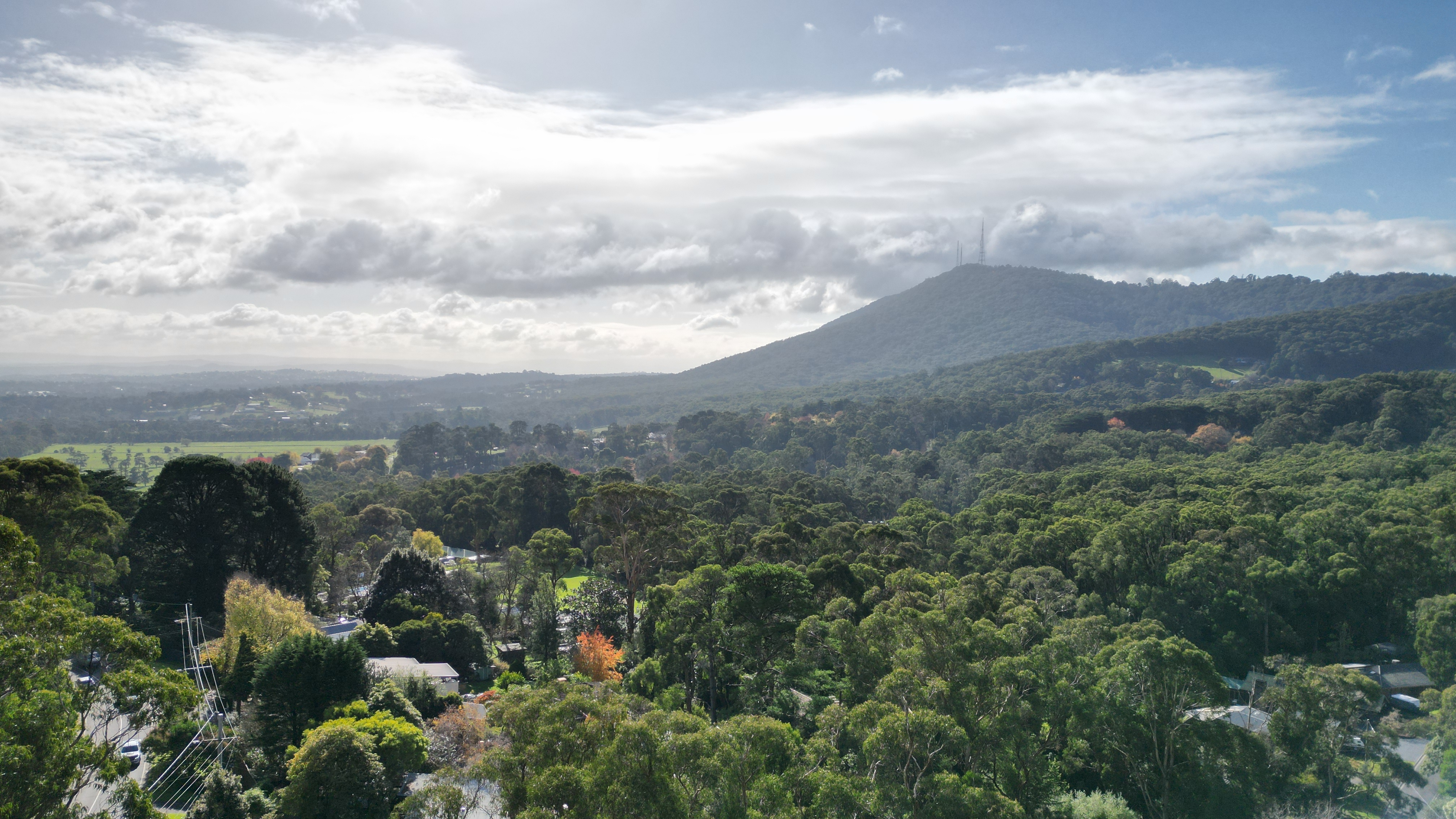
- The Basin (looking towards Mount Dandenong)

- Coordinates: 37.860°S 145.314°E
- Country: Australia
- State: Victoria
- City: Melbourne
- LGA: City of Knox
- Location: 31 km (19 mi) from Melbourne

Government
  - Mayor: Luke Cockerell
  - State electorate: Bayswater, Monbulk
  - Federal division: Aston

Area
  - Total: 5.7 km^{2} (2.2 sq mi)
- Elevation: 184 m (604 ft)

Population
  - Total: 4,497 (2021 census)
  - Density: 789/km^{2} (2,043/sq mi)
- Postcode: 3154
Suburbs around The Basin
Kilsyth South	Kilsyth	Dandenong Ranges
Boronia	The Basin	Dandenong Ranges
Sassafras	Tremont	Sassafras

The Basin is a suburb in Melbourne, Victoria, Australia, 31 km east of Melbourne's Central Business District, located within the City of Knox local government area. The Basin recorded a population of 4,497 at the 2021 census.

== History ==
=== Traditional custodians ===
Prior to European settlement, The Basin and surrounding suburbs were often visited by the Bunurong and Yarra Yarra people—hunting in the summer months in the Dandenong Ranges and its foothills. The Wurundjeri people of the Kulin nation are the acknowledged traditional custodians of the land on which The Basin and all of City of Knox is located.

=== Origin of the name ===
The Government Botanist Ferdinand von Mueller named the area The Basin about 1860 during a visit to the Dandenong Ranges because it is located in a "basin" surrounded by hills.

"The Basin" is shown on an 1868 survey plan, when settlers had taken licences or made freehold purchases of the land.

=== Early European settlers ===
William Peverill Watson is recorded as being the first official occupier of land in the area now known as The Basin in 1867. David Dobson arrived in Melbourne in 1854 and settled at The Basin as early as 1870 on land that extended from what is now Wicks Reserve through to Pavitt Lane bordered by Sheffield Road, Mountain Highway and Liverpool Road. David Dobson was instrumental in the establishment of The Basin Primary School. The Dobson family still occupies 60 acres of that original land.

Location of the oak tree planted by William and Kate Chandler, and the subsequent historical marker.

Other significant early European settlers included the Chandler family. William Chandler was a market gardener who arrived in Victoria in 1854 and eventually settled in The Basin in 1873. He was the first in the area to crossbreed seeds and produce exceptional flowers and vegetables. William and Kate Chandler planted an acorn at what is now 61 Basin-Olinda Rd, soon after they settled in The Basin—the English Oak still stands.

Two of William Chandler's sons established plant nurseries in the area and his grandson, Sir Gilbert Chandler was a horticulturalist and Ferntree Gully Shire President (1938–39) who later went on to be a member of State Parliament.

Notable settlers included J.J. Miller, book-maker and publisher of Miller's Racing Guide. In 1872, Miller acquired land at The Basin in 1872 and invested considerable time and money building up a stud farm for racing horses, at one stage owning over 1,000 acres (4.0 km^{2}) in The Basin. To encourage summer tourists to visit and see the stables, training facilities and horses, Miller ran a private coach service from Forest Road in The Basin to Bayswater Railway Station. He also helped publicise the district with a gigantic fireworks display each Christmas. Miller was prominent in local affairs and was the first President of the new Shire of Ferntree Gully. In 1888, Miller was the first in the area to secure a wine licence at his home. Miller faced financial ruin in the 1890s when the sweepstakes were declared illegal and he had to give up his property at The Basin. The home remains as a significant local historical building.

The Basin Post Office opened around 1902.

== Government ==
Residents are represented in the Victorian Parliament (Legislative Assembly) by the member for the electorate of Bayswater and in the Federal Parliament (House of Representatives) by the member for the electorate of Aston.

== Media ==
The Boronia and The Basin Community Newspaper (BBCN) is produced and distributed each month by local volunteers. It focuses on local stories and history, including feature articles on immigrants' stories and local businesses.

== Parks and gardens ==
The Basin forms one of Melbourne's "green wedges" and is nestled into the forest covered foothills of Mount Dandenong and the Dandenong Ranges National Park, including Doongalla Forest. This was formerly part of the Doongalla Estate, purchased by Sir Matthew Davies in 1891. The residential development of the suburb includes bushy parks such as Wicks Reserve and some farmland.

A significant natural resource is an operating farm that is owned and operated by the Salvation Army and includes a community church. The farm was purchased by the Salvation Army from David Dobson and others in 1897. In the same year a boys' home was established on the purchased land, in response to a government request for church groups to support boys who commit criminal offences. The home was originally named "The Eden". At its height, it provided for 110 boys. The Salvation Army's site on Basin Olinda Road, The Basin is used for school camps, conferences and functions.

Important buildings include the Progress Hall and Elderly Citizens Hall. Both are located within "The Basin Triangle", which also includes a Scouts hall, The Basin Fire Brigade (CFA) facility, a children's playground and open space.

== Transport ==
Mountain Highway (also known as Wantirna-Sassafras road) runs from the intersection with Burwood Highway in western Wantirna, and continues to Sassafras, going through The Basin. This road is known as the 1:20 amongst cyclists due to the grade of the road - the town is home to a Café of the same name. This route is a challenging, and popular one for riders around Melbourne.

The Basin-Olinda Road is a mostly unsealed road that leads to the mountain town of Olinda.

Bus route 755 runs from The Basin to local train stations at Bayswater, Boronia and Ferntree Gully.

In 1888, a tramway connecting Bayswater and Olinda, past The Basin was unsuccessfully proposed. The project was promoted by James John Miller, and was granted support, and permission by the Shire of Berwick. The tramway was to operate either as cable, or electric. However, this plan never got past the planning stage.

== Education ==
The suburb has three primary schools:

- The Basin Primary School. The original school building is used today to house the administration offices of the school.
- St Bernadette's Catholic Primary school. The school opened on Wednesday 2 February 1983. The land had been purchased many years earlier in anticipation of the need for a Catholic School.

There are two pre-schools—The Basin Pre-school (Forest Road) and Goodwin Estate pre-school (Rome Beauty Avenue)

== Retail ==
There are various shops and restaurants fronting two sides of The Basin Triangle, amidst a village atmosphere. Retail outlets include a gym, a licensed post office, two pubs, cafés, liquor store, greengrocer, jeweller, butcher, financial advisor, wine bar/restaurant, bookstore, hairdressing salons, tattooist and fish and chip shop.

== Culture and community ==
The Basin Theatre Group is a local amateur theatre group that has operated since the first gathering of friends by Edna Chandler in 1954. Early productions were first conducted in the Basin Progress Hall. In 1962 the group constructed an A-frame barn that became known as The Hut. Later in 1973, the group constructed a larger theatre on land donated by Edna and Fergus Chandler. The group conducts four productions per year that include a range of performances in all theatrical styles. The Basin Theatre Group's mission is to provide a variety of theatrical productions that are high quality and affordable, and at times, extraordinary and inspiring. Details of productions and booking information can be found on The Basin Theatre Website.

Local groups include the Country Fire Authority and The 1st Basin Scout Group.

The inaugural The Basin Music Festival was held in March 2005 and is held annually every March. Details of musicians and tickets can be found at The Basin Music Festival website.

Places of Worship in The Basin include the Romanian Seventh-day Adventist Church, St Bernadette's Catholic Mass Centre (part of the primary school) and Vinayagar Hindu Temple.

== Sport ==
The town has two tennis clubs; Miller Park Tennis Club and Batterham Park Tennis Club, and Australian Rules football team, The Basin Bears, competing in the Eastern Football League.
