= Three Bridges, Victoria =

Three Bridges
- Town
- Interactive map of Three Bridges
- Coordinates: 37°50′S 145°41′E
- Country: Australia
- State: Victoria
- LGA: Shire of Yarra Ranges

Government
  - State electorate: Eildon
  - Federal division: McEwen

Population
  - Total: 188 (2021 census)
- Postcode: 3797

Three Bridges is a locality in Victoria, Australia, on the Yarra Junction Noojee Road, located within the Shire of Yarra Ranges local government area. Three Bridges recorded a population of 188 at the 2021 census.

== History ==
Three Bridges Post Office opened on 17 July 1914 and closed in 1956.
