= Mount Dandenong (Victoria) =

Mountain in Victoria, Australia

- Corhanwarrabul
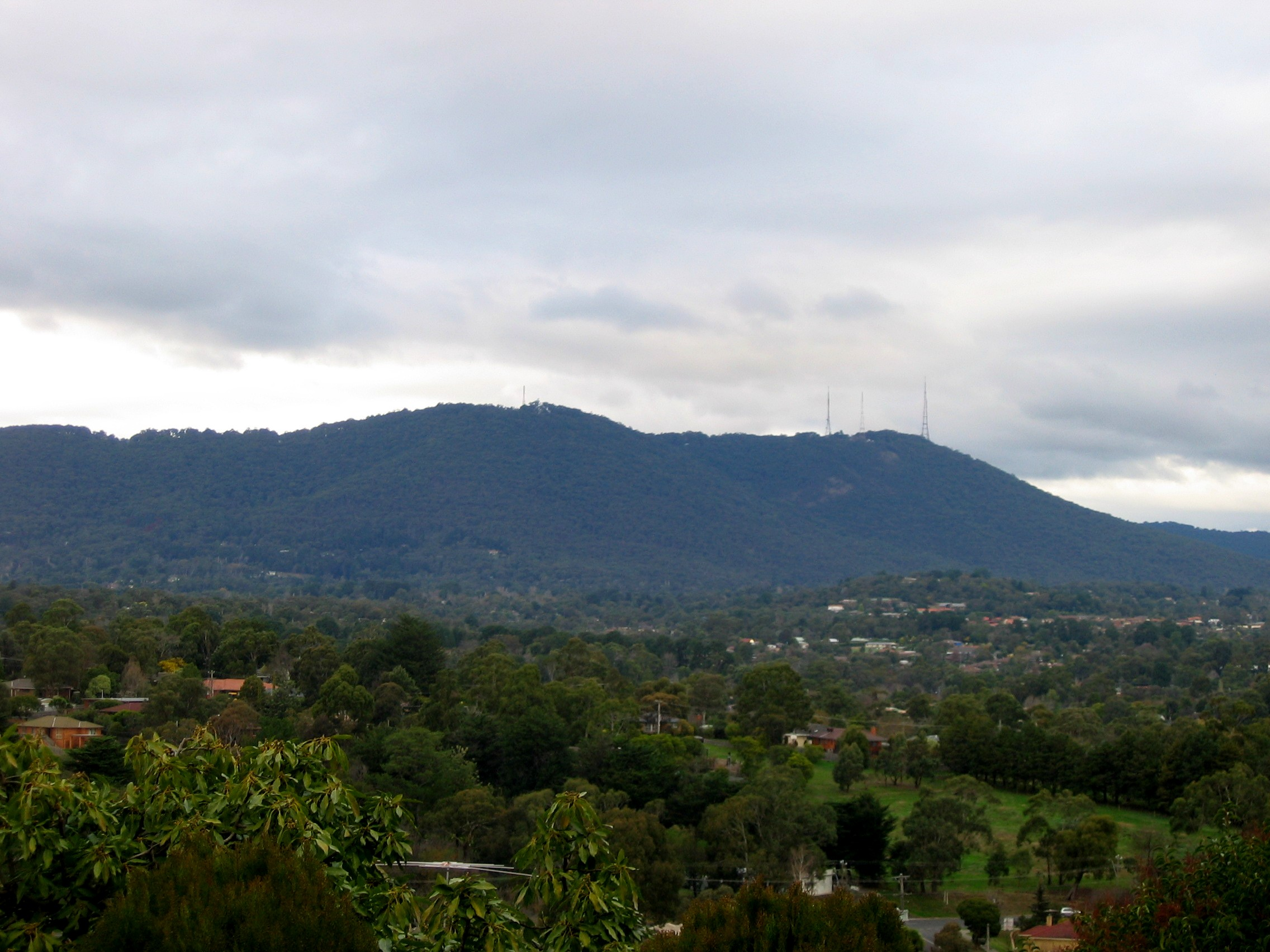
- Mount Dandenong, as viewed from Mooroolbark

Highest point
- Elevation: 633 m (2,077 ft)
- Prominence: 364 m (1,194 ft)
- Isolation: 23.1 km (14.4 mi)
- Listing: List of mountains in Australia
- Coordinates: 37°49′38″S 145°21′10″E

Geography
- Location within Victoria
- Country: Australia
- State: Victoria
- Protected area: Dandenong Ranges National Park
- Parent range: Dandenong Ranges, Great Dividing Range

Mount Dandenong (Aboriginal Woiwurrung language: Corhanwarrabul) is a mountain that is part of the Dandenong Ranges of the Great Dividing Range, located in the Central District of Victoria, Australia. The mountain has an elevation of 633 metres (2,077 ft) and is located approximately 45 kilometres (28 mi) east of Melbourne.

== Geology ==
The mountain is the remains of a massive and explosive volcanic eruption over 300 million years ago. This has left the ranges spread between Coldstream, Emerald and south of Ferntree Gully.

== Features ==
Mount Dandenong features parks, forests, an arboretum, numerous lookouts and many restaurants.

=== Lookouts ===
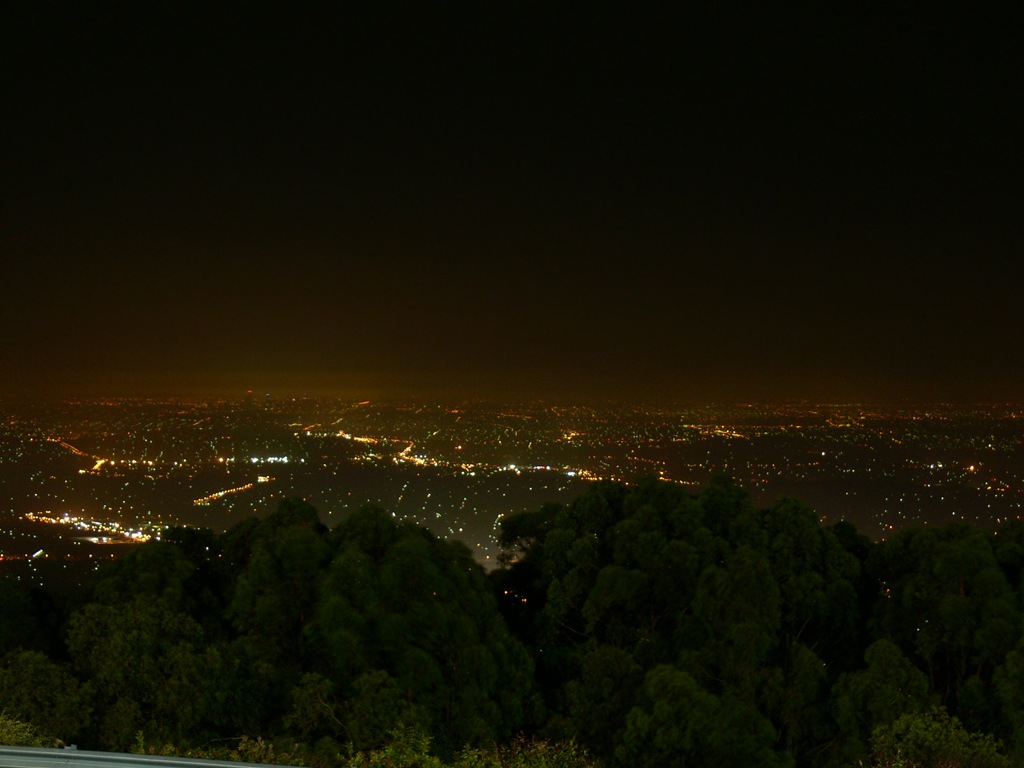
View of Melbourne from the summit at night

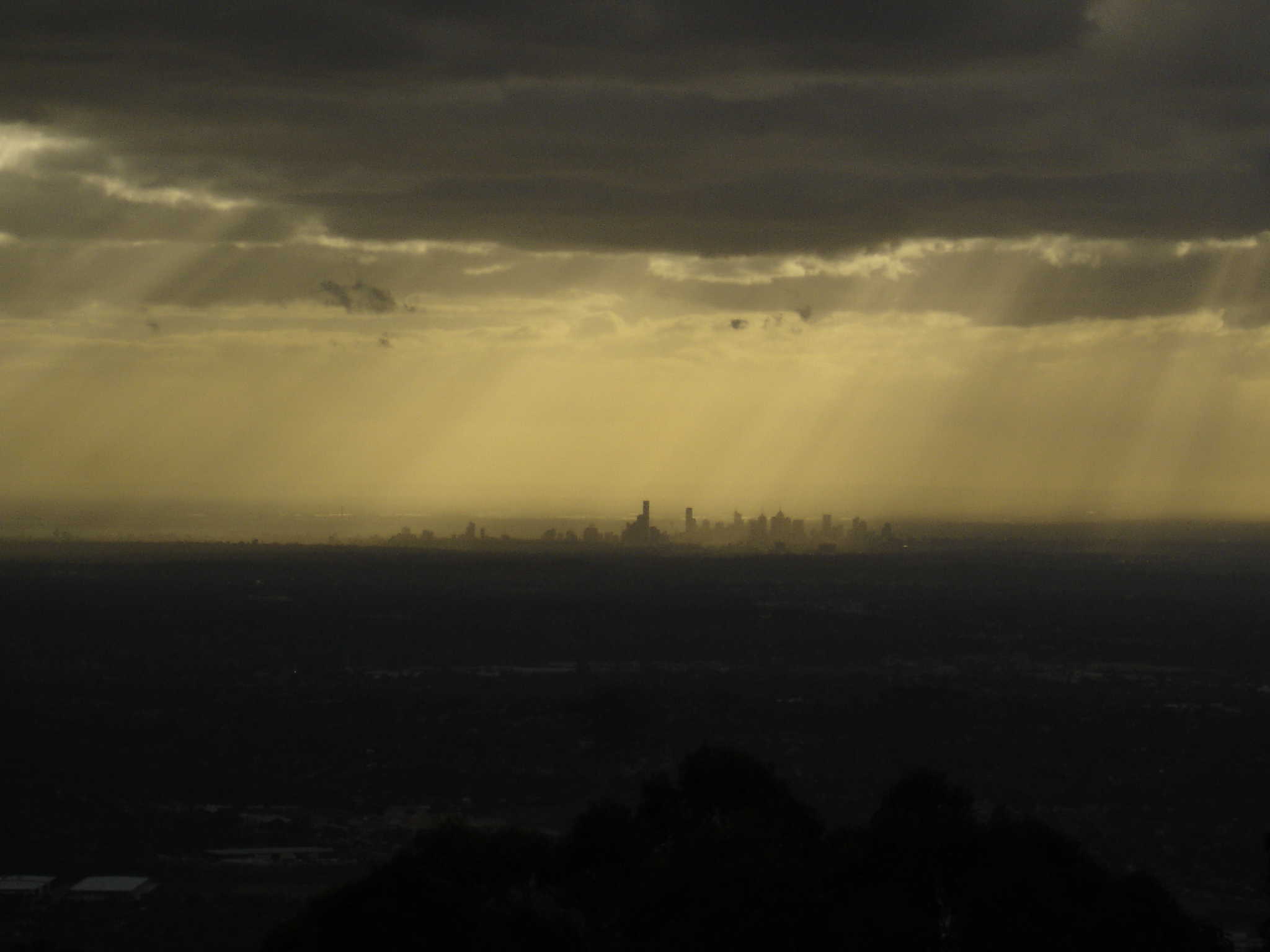
View of Melbourne from the summit at dusk

Close to the summit of the mountain sits the SkyHigh Mount Dandenong restaurant, gardens and maze, re-opened in 2005.

On a clear day it is possible to see across the metropolitan area to the You Yangs and Mount Macedon, putting the Melbourne Central Business District and Port Phillip Bay into a broader geographical context.

=== The summit ===
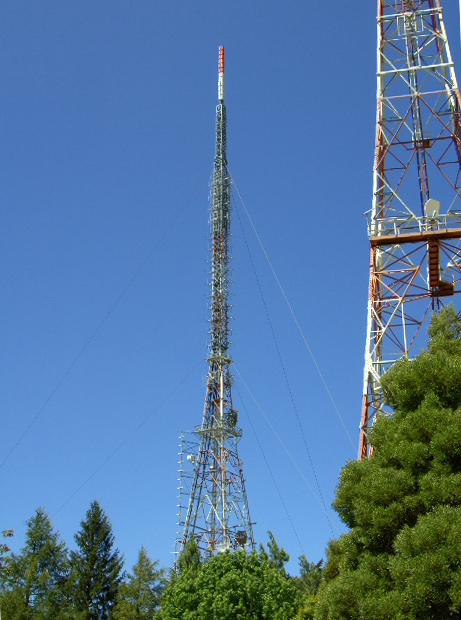
Transmission towers

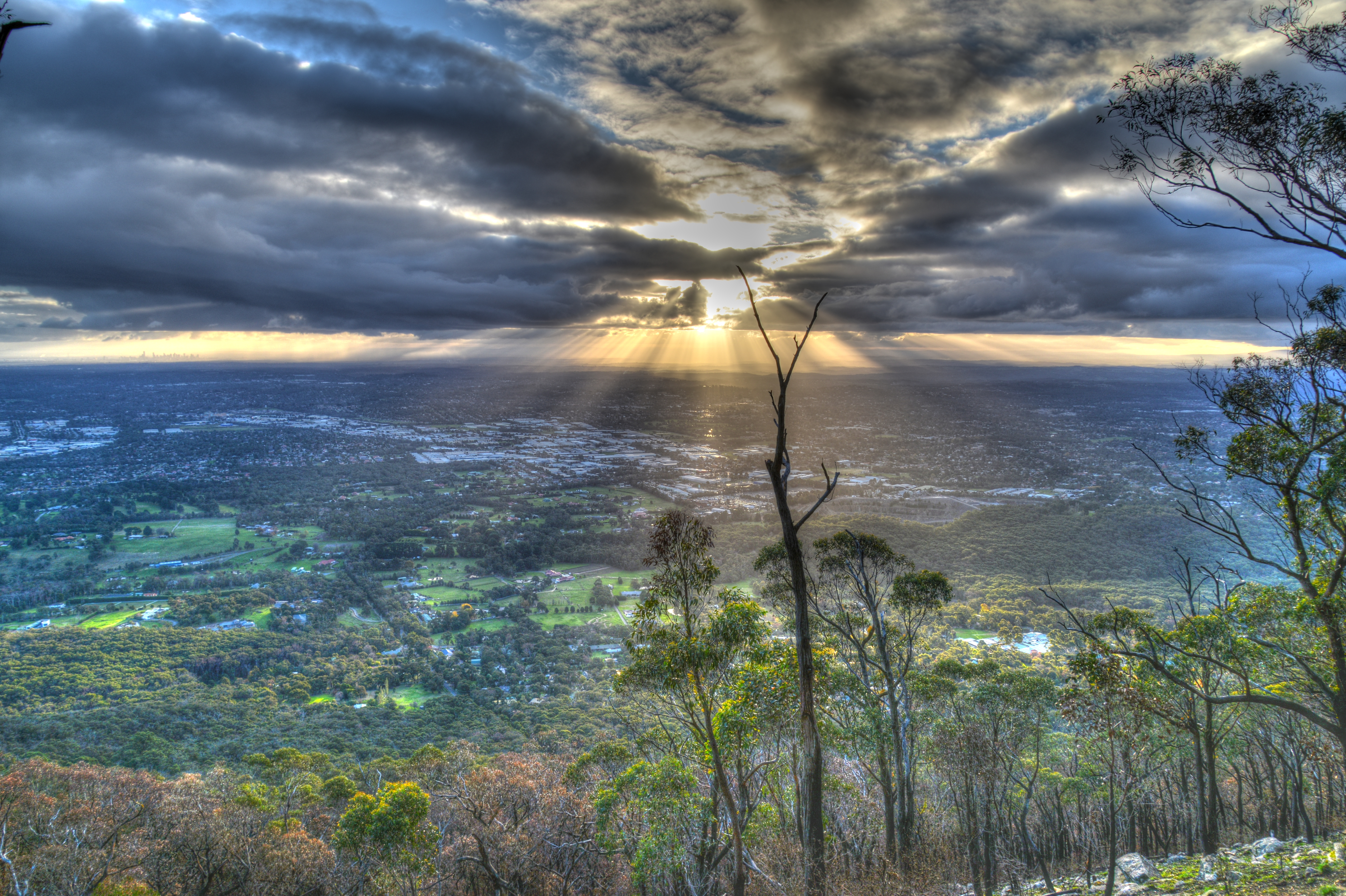
View from the lookout near the Kyeema crash site on Mount Dandenong.

The peak of the mountain, at 633 m above sea level, is also the site of the television and FM radio signal towers for the greater Melbourne area, which range in height from 72 m to 180 m. These towers are visible from quite a distance and distinguish Mount Dandenong from others in the Dandenong Ranges.

=== Tourist road ===
Mount Dandenong Tourist Road, the main road going through Mount Dandenong, is host to many local shops. These include cafes, restaurants and eateries, pubs, day spas, wine and fine food purveyors, a nursery and many shops selling local crafts.

=== William Ricketts Sanctuary ===
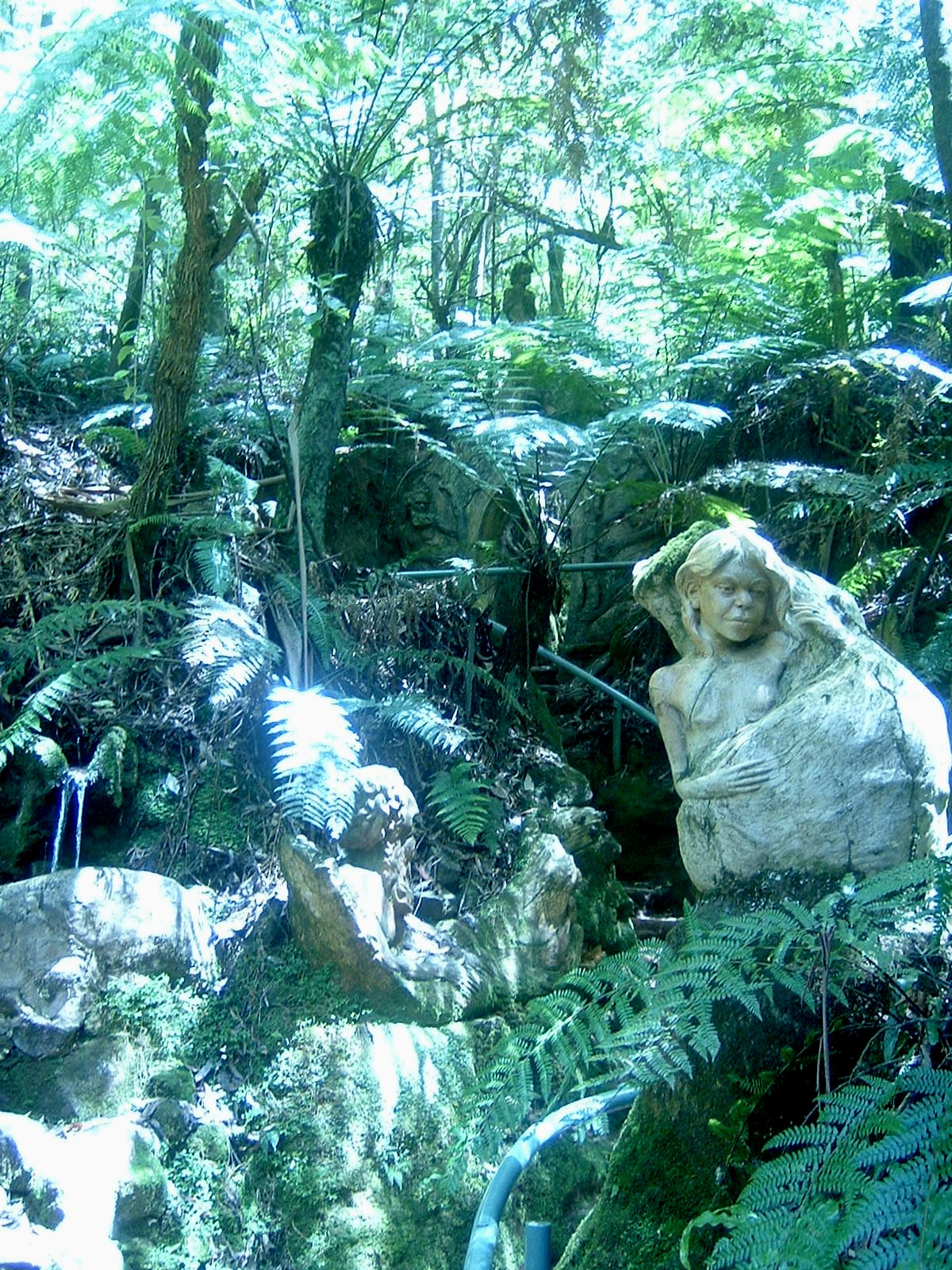
William Ricketts Sanctuary

The William Ricketts Sanctuary is situated on the east face of Mount Dandenong. It has over 93 ceramic sculptures woven into the eucalyptus forest.

=== SkyHigh Mount Dandenong ===
SkyHigh Mount Dandenong is a restaurant on top of the mountain.

In the 1970s and 1980s, the site was an iconic Melbourne attraction, and was well known to most Melburnians; however, in the early 1990s the site fell into disrepair, and the building began to look aged and dilapidated. This culminated with the site being shut down completely in 1997.

In 2004, a new lease was negotiated with Parks Victoria, the government authority in charge of the land. The restaurant and surrounding gardens were given a $3.5 million facelift, and the site re-opened in December 2004, with the name officially being changed from "Mount Dandenong Observatory" to the current "SkyHigh Mount Dandenong".

The renovations to the site included construction of an upstairs balcony and an enlarged viewing window. Besides work on the building itself, the surrounding land was graded and landscaped, and many new plants added and the hedge maze started.

Prior to 2021 SkyHigh had employed up to 90 people. Efforts to reopen following Victoria's COVID lockdown were thwarted when SkyHigh was extensively damaged by storms in 2021.

The English Garden has grown significantly since being planted in 2005. It features meandering gravel paths and several wooden arch bridges crossing a man-made stream, constructed as part of the renovations.

The SkyHigh Maze, designed by John Connellan, opened in 2007. The maze features garden squares designed around fountains, and a trompe-l'œil.

The Giant’s Chair is a large novelty wooden chair on the front lawn of the site.

The Kugel ball is a sculpture consisting of a large granite ball supported by a very thin film of water.

The Australiana Tree is a large gum tree. Rapidly dying after being struck by lightning in 2006, it has been carved into the shape of many native animals in a totem pole style.

== See also ==
- List of mountains in Australia § Victoria
- 1938 Kyeema crash
