= Sherbrooke, Victoria =

Sherbrooke
- Town
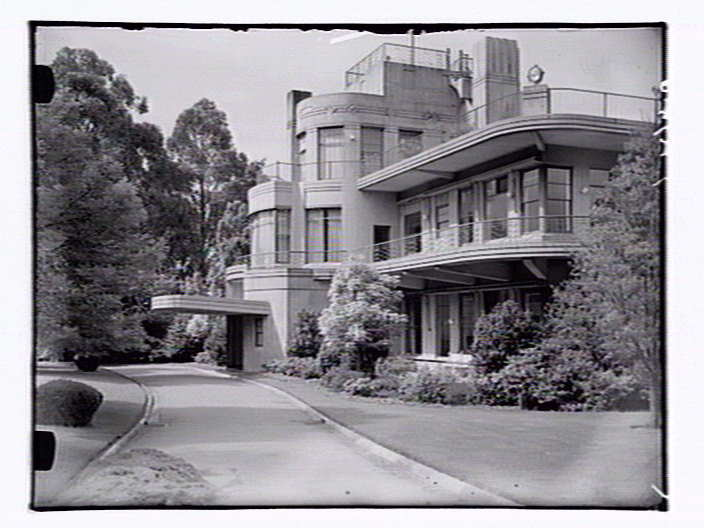
- Burnham Beeches, in Sherbrooke, 1947

- Interactive map of Sherbrooke
- Country: Australia
- State: Victoria
- City: Melbourne
- LGA: Shire of Yarra Ranges
- Location: 42 km (26 mi) from Melbourne; 6 km (3.7 mi) from Belgrave
- Established: 1893

Government
  - State electorate: Monbulk
  - Federal division: Casey

Area
  - Total: 0.7 km^{2} (0.27 sq mi)

Population
  - Total: 294 (2021 census)
  - Density: 420/km^{2} (1,090/sq mi)
- Postcode: 3789
Localities around Sherbrooke
| Ferny Creek | Sassafras | Kallista |
| Tecoma | Sherbrooke | Kallista |
| Belgrave | Belgrave | Selby |

Sherbrooke is a locality in Victoria, Australia, 35 km east of Melbourne, located within the Shire of Yarra Ranges local government area. Sherbrooke recorded a population of 294 at the 2021 census.

== History ==
Permanent European settlement began with Robert W. Graham, an ex sea captain (born 1836 in Ludlow, Shropshire England) who spent eight years living in Quebec, Canada, before migrating to Australia with his family. He built a small house Merrimu, hand-cut from the forest, using horizontal-slab wall construction, an adobe floor, weatherboards and a sapling/shingle roof. Now noted as the "father of Sherbrooke", Graham named the area after Sherbrooke the location near his place of residence in Canada. He is also credited with discovering Sherbrooke Falls, originally named Graham Falls. He was the first postmaster of Sherbrooke, the position he held from 1894 until his death in 1918. A rough hut at the back of the house, with a delivery slot cut in the door, served as the first post office. Both the house and the post office building still stand.

In March 2019, Burnham Beeches, a 1930s art deco property owned by celebrity chef Shannon Bennett, was transformed into an art installation by street artist Rone aka Tyrone Wright. Originally the home of industrialist Alfred Nicholas and his family, it later served as a research facility, a children's hospital, and a luxury hotel. It was slated for conversion into a luxury hotel, beginning in mid-2019, but this did not proceed. As of October 2025, the heritage-listed property was vacant despite ongoing proposals for development.

=== Heritage listings ===
The following places in Sherbooke are listed on the Victorian Heritage Register:

- Burnham Beeches and the Alfred Nicholas Memorial Gardens, 1 Sherbrooke Road, in the Streamline Moderne style
- Mawarra house and gardens, 6 Sherbrooke Road

== Sherbrooke Forest ==
Sherbrooke Forest is a cool temperate rainforest that is listed as endangered and is protected by the state's Flora and Fauna Guarantee Act. It is a habitat of the tallest flowering plant in the world, mountain ash (Eucalyptus regnans), which can exceed 100 metres (330 ft) in height.

The forest has populations of swamp wallabies, wombats, platypus, echidnas and several species of possums and gliders; and is also a habitat of the lyrebird. Other birds found in the area include galahs, long-billed and little corellas, Australian king parrots, crimson rosellas and sulphur-crested cockatoos.
