= Mount Dandenong =

- Town
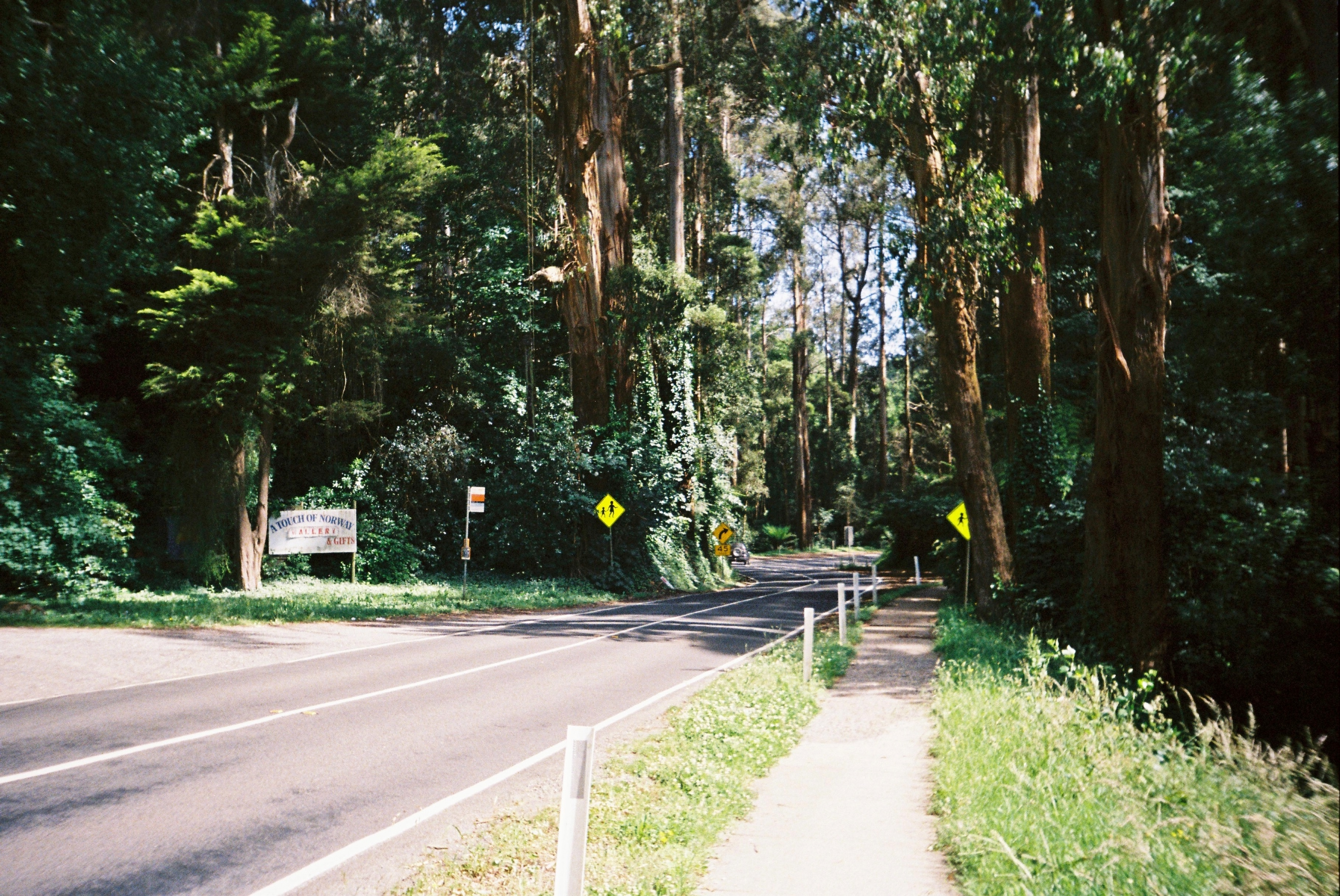
- Mount Dandenong tourist road running through Mount Dandenong

- Interactive map of Mount Dandenong
- Coordinates: 37°50′10″S 145°21′04″E
- Country: Australia
- State: Victoria
- City: Melbourne
- LGA: Shire of Yarra Ranges
- Location: 44 km (27 mi) E of Melbourne CBD
- Established: 1893

Government
  - State electorate: Monbulk
  - Federal division: Casey

Area
  - Total: 10.1 km^{2} (3.9 sq mi)

Population
  - Total: 1,271 (2021 census)
  - Density: 125.8/km^{2} (325.9/sq mi)
- Postcode: 3767
- Mean max temp: 15.2 °C (59.4 °F)
- Mean min temp: 7.8 °C (46.0 °F)
- Annual rainfall: 1,165.9 mm (45.90 in)
Localities around Mount Dandenong
Montrose	Montrose	Kalorama
Kilsyth	Mount Dandenong	Olinda
The Basin	Sassafras	Olinda

Mount Dandenong, sometimes styled as Mt. Dandenong, is a township and suburb of the Greater Melbourne area in Victoria, Australia, 44 km (27 mi) east of the Melbourne central business district (CBD), located within the local government area of the Shire of Yarra Ranges. Mount Dandenong recorded a population of 1,271 at the 2021 census.

Light to moderate snowfalls occur on Mount Dandenong a few times most years, most frequently between late winter and late spring. The area around Mount Dandenong experienced a highly unusual summer snow fall on Christmas Day 2006.

== History ==
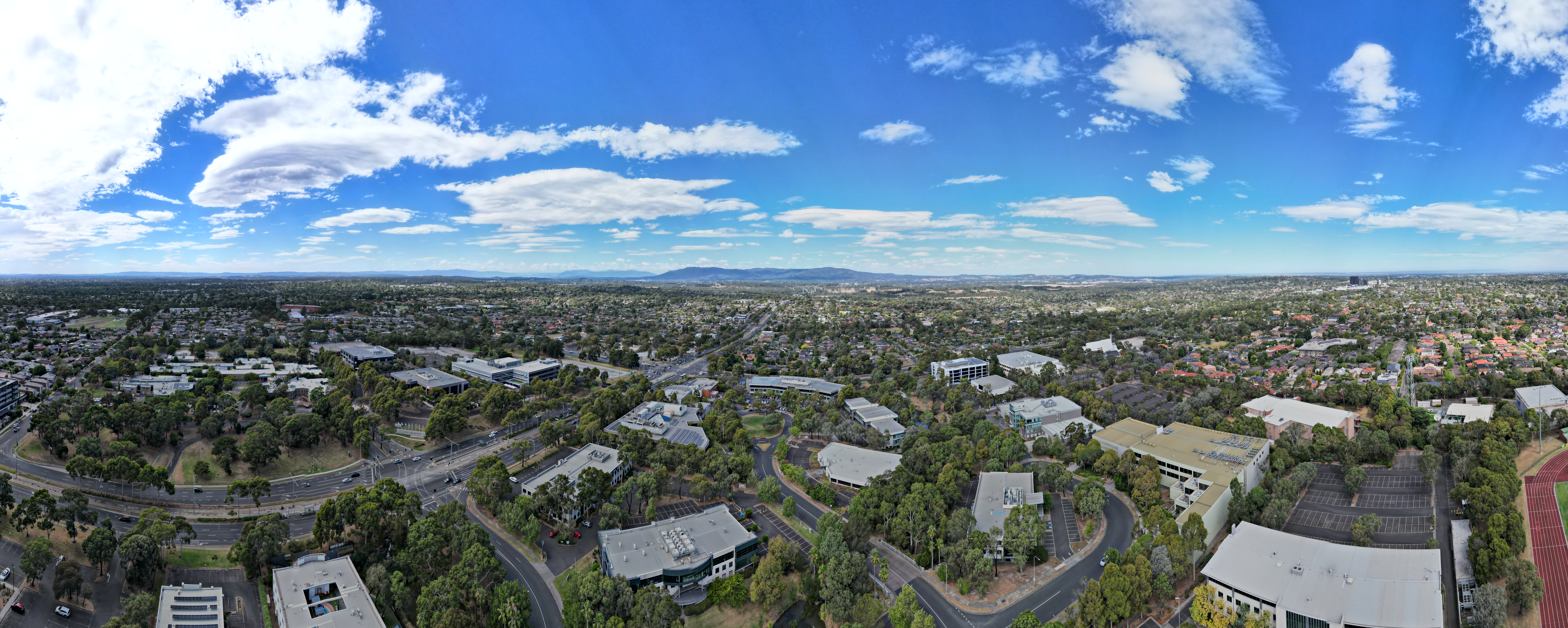
Burwood East facing the Dandenong Ranges to the East

Originally the town was to be named Mount Corhanwarrabul, but due to the problems that were foreseen with the spelling and pronunciation of this name, the Surveyor-General's office opted to name it Mount Dandenong. However, today there is still a Mount Corhanwarrabul, which is on the site of Burkes Lookout. The town of Mount Dandenong was settled in 1893, along with a neighbouring town, Olinda. It was around this time that the Government established 10-acre (40,000 m^{2}) farms that would be used to harvest timber.

By around 1900 the town had its own general store and primary school. The Post Office, opened in 1902, was closed and replaced by one at Kalorama in 1991. In 1922 the first motorcars were seen in operation in Mount Dandenong.

In 1938, the 1938 Kyeema Crash occurred eighteen people were killed when the Kyeema, an Australian National Airways DC-2, VH-UYC crashed.

A proposal around 2002 for the building of a large "Melbourne" sign on the mountain, similar to the Hollywood sign, was vigorously opposed and not pursued.

== Climate ==
Mount Dandenong has a cool oceanic climate (Cfb), with cool to mild summers and cold, damp winters. Daytime temperatures are usually 4−6 °C cooler than downtown Melbourne due to its elevation and exposed topography. It is significantly cloudier than Melbourne, particularly in the winter due to the heavy orographic lifting brought about by cold fronts. Snowfalls are fairly common from June to October above 500 m and can be heavy at times, with at least one instance of snow in December.

Climate data for Mount Dandenong GTV9 (1968−1986, rainfall to 2007); 600 m AMSL; 37.83° S, 145.35° E
Month	Jan	Feb	Mar	Apr	May	Jun	Jul	Aug	Sep	Oct	Nov	Dec	Year
Record high °C (°F)	37.3 (99.1)	39.3 (102.7)	33.6 (92.5)	28.0 (82.4)	20.3 (68.5)	15.0 (59.0)	16.0 (60.8)	20.0 (68.0)	22.7 (72.9)	28.7 (83.7)	33.2 (91.8)	36.2 (97.2)	39.3 (102.7)
Mean daily maximum °C (°F)	22.1 (71.8)	22.9 (73.2)	19.7 (67.5)	15.4 (59.7)	11.7 (53.1)	8.8 (47.8)	8.2 (46.8)	9.6 (49.3)	11.6 (52.9)	14.8 (58.6)	17.3 (63.1)	19.9 (67.8)	15.2 (59.3)
Mean daily minimum °C (°F)	11.5 (52.7)	12.6 (54.7)	11.3 (52.3)	9.0 (48.2)	6.9 (44.4)	4.4 (39.9)	3.6 (38.5)	4.2 (39.6)	5.0 (41.0)	6.8 (44.2)	8.3 (46.9)	9.8 (49.6)	7.8 (46.0)
Record low °C (°F)	4.0 (39.2)	4.7 (40.5)	3.7 (38.7)	0.7 (33.3)	−0.4 (31.3)	−1.0 (30.2)	−2.3 (27.9)	−2.0 (28.4)	−1.8 (28.8)	−0.6 (30.9)	0.5 (32.9)	2.3 (36.1)	−2.3 (27.9)
Average precipitation mm (inches)	70.2 (2.76)	61.2 (2.41)	74.6 (2.94)	102.0 (4.02)	129.6 (5.10)	98.4 (3.87)	95.5 (3.76)	116.8 (4.60)	106.0 (4.17)	104.8 (4.13)	109.4 (4.31)	95.7 (3.77)	1,165.9 (45.90)
Average precipitation days	12.1	8.4	12.4	13.7	18.2	17.8	20.0	19.7	17.5	16.5	15.2	12.9	184.4
Mean monthly sunshine hours	232.5	217.5	189.1	150.0	102.3	78.0	83.7	105.4	126.0	170.5	189.0	198.4	1,842.4
Source 1: Mount Dandenong GTV9 (temperatures and rainfall, 1968–2007)
Source 2: Toolangi (Mount St Leonard DPI, sunshine hours 1965–2001)

=== Recent snowfalls ===
- 2007 – 17 and 18 July
- 2006 – 25 December
- 2006 – 15 November
- 2006 – 28 October
- 2005 – 10 August
