= 1938 Kyeema crash =

1938 aviation accident

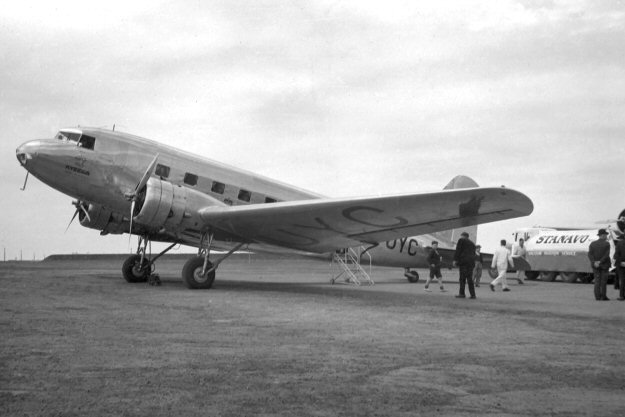
- VH-UYC, the aircraft involved in the accident in October 1937

Occurrence
- Date: 25 October 1938
- Summary: Controlled flight into terrain due to Poor visibility and pilot error.
- Site: Mount Dandenong (Mount Corhanwarrabul), Dandenong Ranges, Victoria, Australia; 37.833°S 145.349°E

Aircraft
- Aircraft type: Douglas DC-2-210
- Aircraft name: Kyeema
- Operator: Australian National Airways
- Registration: VH-UYC
- Flight origin: Adelaide Airport, Adelaide, South Australia
- Destination: Essendon Airport, Melbourne, Victoria
- Passengers: 14
- Crew: 4
- Fatalities: 18
- Survivors: 0

The Kyeema airline crash occurred on 25 October 1938 when the Australian National Airways Douglas DC-2 Kyeema, tail number VH-UYC, flying from Adelaide to Melbourne, commenced final approach to Essendon Airport through heavy fog and crashed into the western slopes of Mount Dandenong, also known as Mount Corhanwarrabul, killing all 18 on board instantly.

== Crash summary ==
The flight took off from Adelaide at 11:22. As it entered the area around Melbourne, it came across a heavy cloud layer, extending from 1,500 to 400 feet (460 to 120 m) and making landmark navigation difficult. As a result, the flight crew mistakenly identified Sunbury as Daylesford through a gap in the clouds, leading them to believe that they were 30 kilometres (19 miles) behind where they actually were on their flight plan.

Had the flight crew cross-referenced their ground speed with previous landmarks, they would likely have realised that they were not where they thought they were. Instead, they overshot Essendon and, unable to see through the heavy fog, crashed into Mount Dandenong a few hundred metres from the summit.

Exactly what happened in the last few minutes before the crash is disputed. There are claims that the pilots may have seen the mountain coming and tried to turn the aircraft away, inadvertently making the situation worse by adjusting from a flight path through a gap between two peaks to a path directly into one of them.

There is also strong evidence that the pilots were becoming unsure of their position. According to Macarthur Job's book, Disaster in the Dandenongs, the radio operator had requested the controller Bill Cridge at Essendon give them a radio bearing. Essendon had acknowledged and told them to leave their transmitter on, but the signal stopped and no further contact was made. It is thought that is the moment Kyeema hit the mountain.

The Kyeema crash was the fourth aviation incident in Australia and had the most fatalities until the Bakers Creek air crash in 1943.

== Passengers and crew ==
There were 18 people on board the DC-2: 14 passengers, the captain, the first officer, an air hostess, and a cadet pilot from ANA's aeronautics school who operated the radio during the flight.

=== Crew ===
- A. C. D. Webb, Captain, aged 32.
- Alan J. Steen, Junior Captain, aged 25.
- Philip D. Pring, cadet pilot

=== Passengers ===
- Charles Hawker MHR, aged 44.

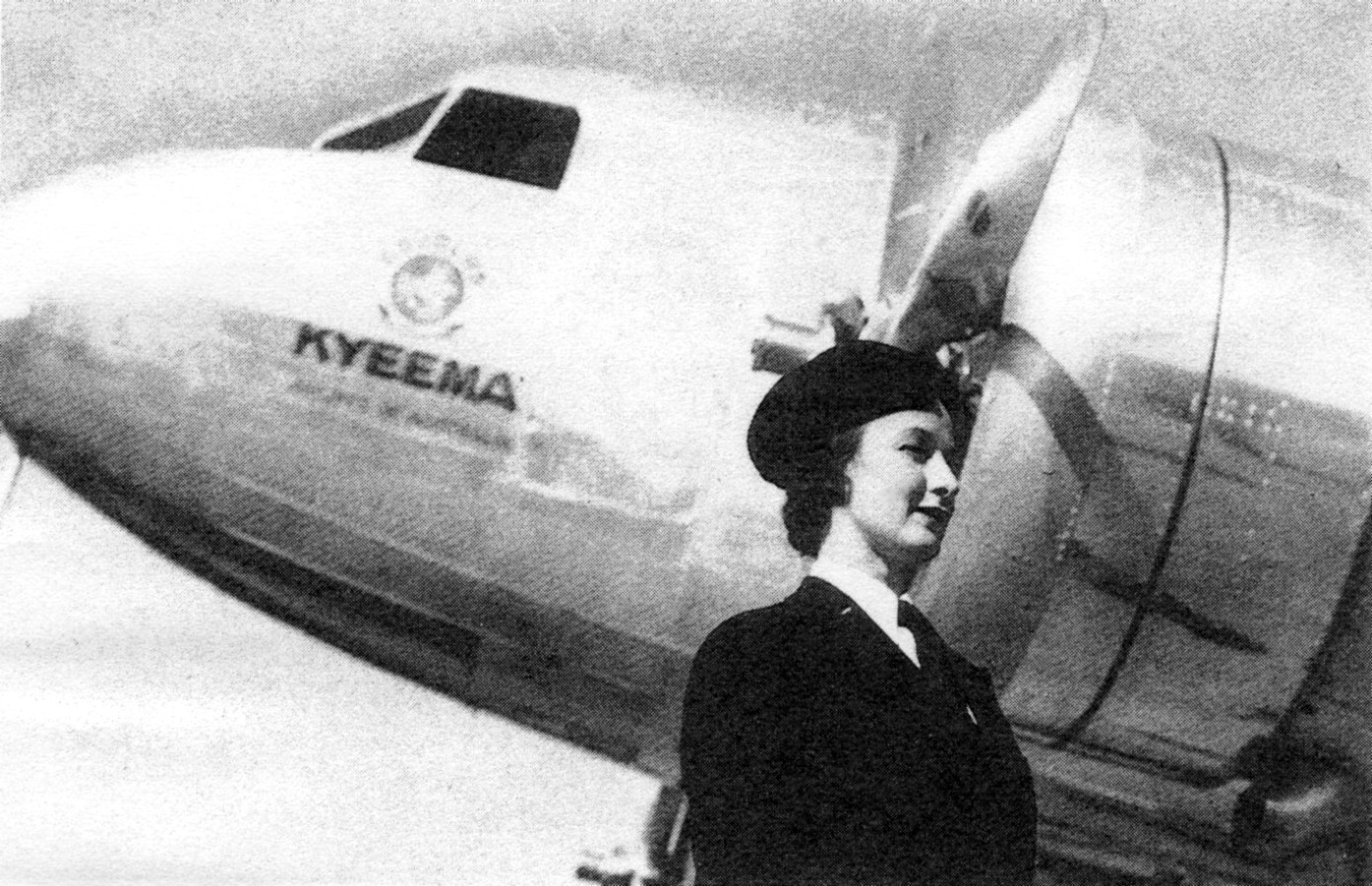
The DC-2 airliner Kyeema

== Aftermath ==
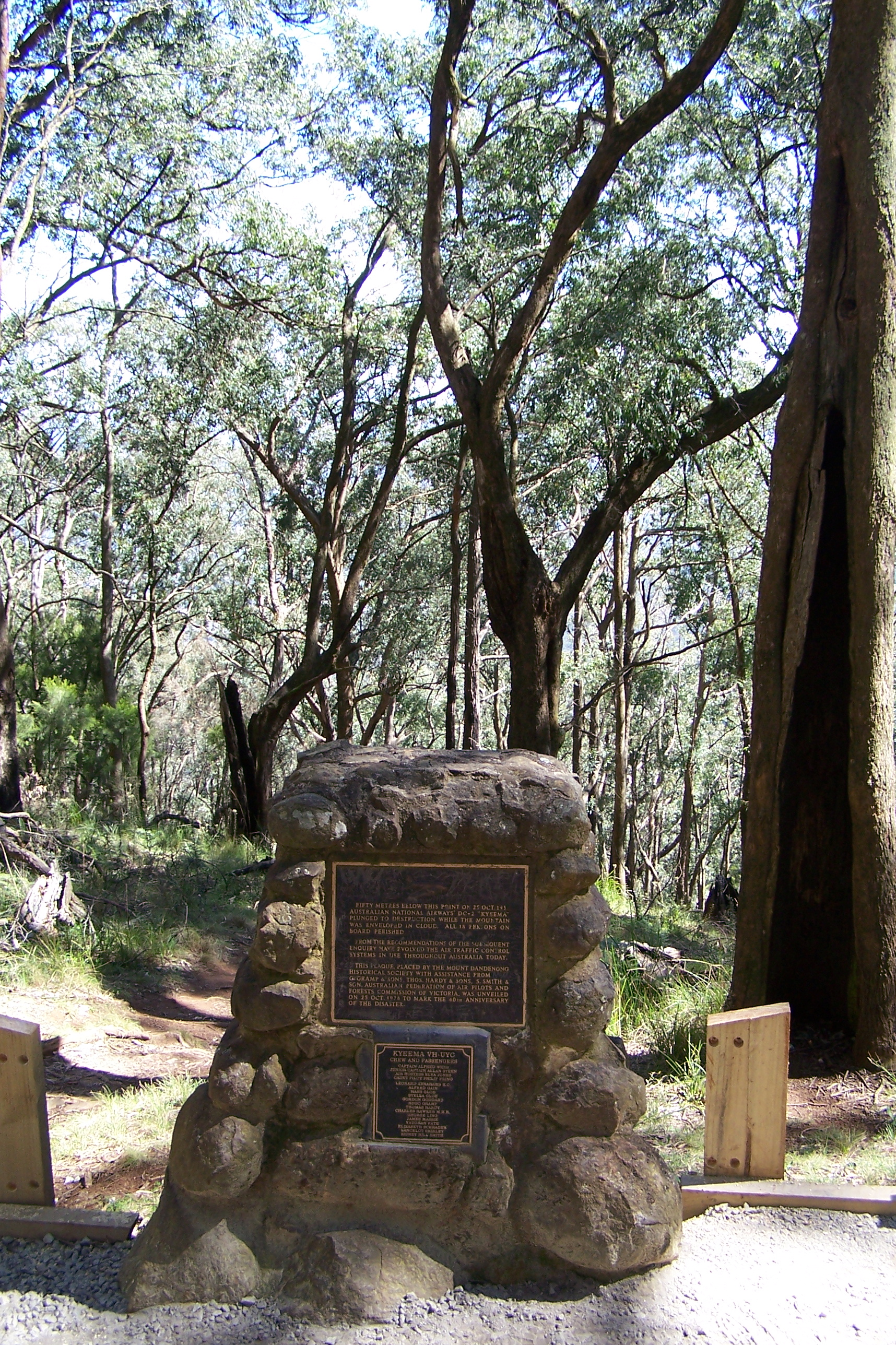
The memorial cairn just above the crash site.

By public demand, a Royal Commission into the cause of the disaster was established, and the Australian Federal Government appointed an Air Accident Investigation Committee, under the chairmanship of Colonel Thomas Murdoch DSO, with the public enquiry commencing on 30 October 1938. Because of the crash, regulations were introduced which required flight checking officers to monitor the flights of aeroplanes and advise on such things as position, weather, and alternative landing options. The implementation of a 33 MHz radio range system was recommended to provide pilots with accurate information on their course.

RAAF officer Eric Harrison was a member of the court of inquiry into the crash on 25 October. Major Melville Langslow, finance member on both the Civil Aviation Board and the RAAF Air Board, was singled out for criticism in the inquiry report over cost-cutting measures that had held up trials of safety beacons designed for such eventualities. According to Air Force historian Chris Coulthard-Clark, when Langslow was appointed Secretary of the Department of Air in November the following year, he went out of his way to "make life difficult" for Harrison, causing "bitterness and friction within the department", and necessitating the Chief of the Air Staff, Air Vice Marshal Stanley Goble, to take steps to shield the safety inspector from the new secretary's ire.

On the 40th anniversary of the crash a memorial cairn was unveiled by the Mount Dandenong Historical Society, with another added in January 2003 naming all those who perished. A nearby road and walking trail close to the crash have also been named after the Kyeema.
