= Dandenong Ranges National Park =

National park in Victoria, Australia

- IUCN category II (national park)
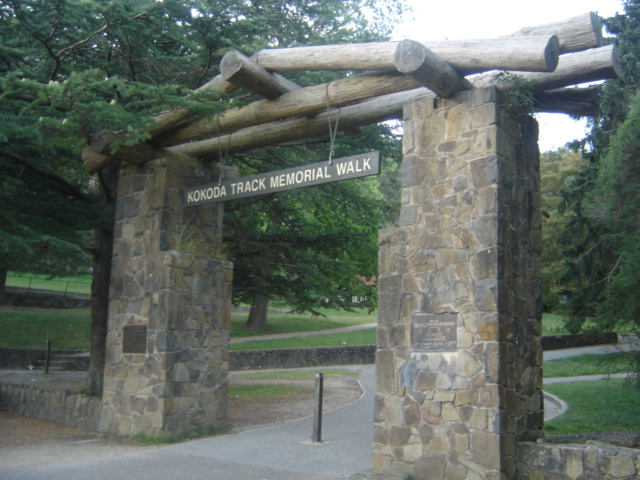
- Ferntree Gully Forest on the Kokoda Track Memorial Walk

- Location within Victoria
- Location: Victoria
- Nearest city: Ferntree Gully; Belgrave; Mount Dandenong; Melbourne (31km)
- Coordinates: 37°48′37″S 145°23′8″E
- Area: 35.4 km^{2} (13.7 sq mi)
- Established: 13 December 1987
- Visitors: over 1,000,000 (in 2010)
- Governing body: Parks Victoria
- Website: www.parks.vic.gov.au/places-to-see/parks/dandenong-ranges-national-park

The Dandenong Ranges National Park is a national park located in the Greater Melbourne region of Victoria, Australia. The 3,540-hectare (8,700-acre) national park is situated from 31 kilometres (19 mi) at its westernmost points at Ferntree Gully and Boronia to 45 kilometres (28 mi) at its easternmost point at Silvan, east of the Melbourne central business district.

The park was proclaimed on 13 December 1987, amalgamating the Ferntree Gully National Park, Sherbrooke Forest and Doongalla Estate. In 1997 the Olinda State Forest, Mt. Evelyn and Montrose Reserve were formally added to the national park.

== History ==
The region was originally inhabited by the Bunurong and Woewurrong Aboriginal people. Most of the forest got cleared when it became a significant source of timber for Melbourne. During the late last century, farming began in the area as roads and railways were built and the 'Puffing Billy' narrow-gauge line from Ferntree Gully to Gembrook started in 1900. Tourism flourished from the 1870s. The Fern Tree Gully was the first to be reserved as a park in 1882 followed by other areas. The present day national park was established in 1987.

== Features ==
Dandenong Ranges National Park is divided into five sections:

- Doongalla Forest – Containing Mount Dandenong itself, and the SkyHigh lookout with panoramic views of Melbourne's east
- Ferntree Gully – The south western section of the Dandenong Ranges National Park, located between the suburbs of Ferntree Gully and Boronia to the west, Upwey to the south, Tremont and Sassafras to the east and The Basin to the north. The park contains the Thousands Steps trail leading to One Tree Hill. The very steep walking trail includes over 700 steps over 2.5 kilometres (1.6 mi) and commemorates the battle for the Kokoda track in Territory of Papua during World War II. The steps are a popular destination for sightseers and fitness enthusiasts alike. During the AFL pre-season a number of Melbourne Australian rules football league and association teams run their players up the steps to promote team fitness. There is no specific creation date of the steps; however, they are believed to be built during the early 1860s when they provided the only means of accessing the One Tree Hill Summit. According to a Tourist Guide published in 1868, all other areas contained thick forest vegetation. A survey of the park found that over 82% of visitors (on weekends) use the park for fitness-related walking. It is also a popular spot for picnics.
- Mount Evelyn Forest is the most northerly section of the park
- Olinda Forest occupies the eastern slopes of Mount Dandenong
- Montrose Reserve is located towards the village of Montrose and was the most recent addition to the park
- Sherbrooke Forest
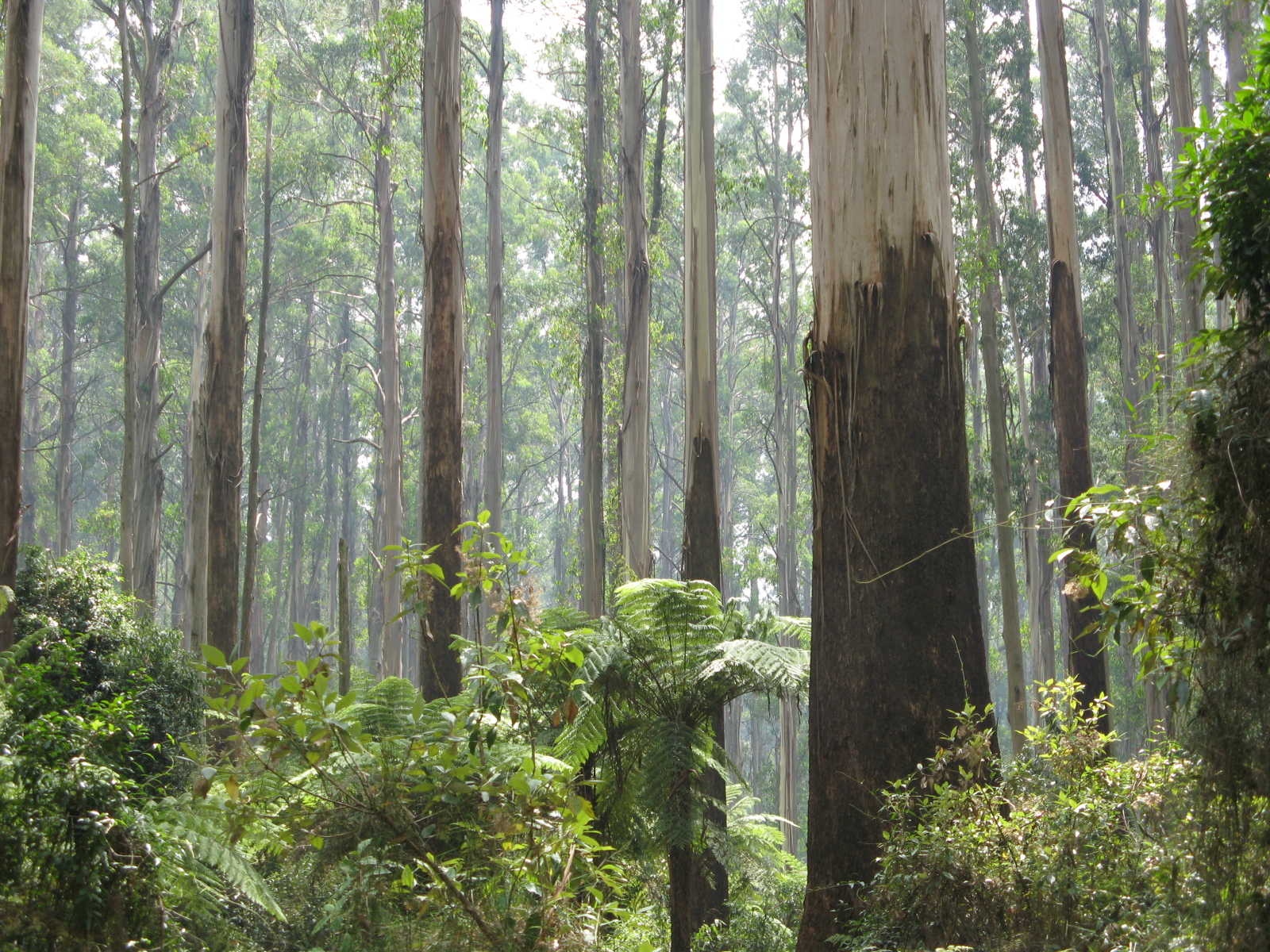
Sherbrooke Forest

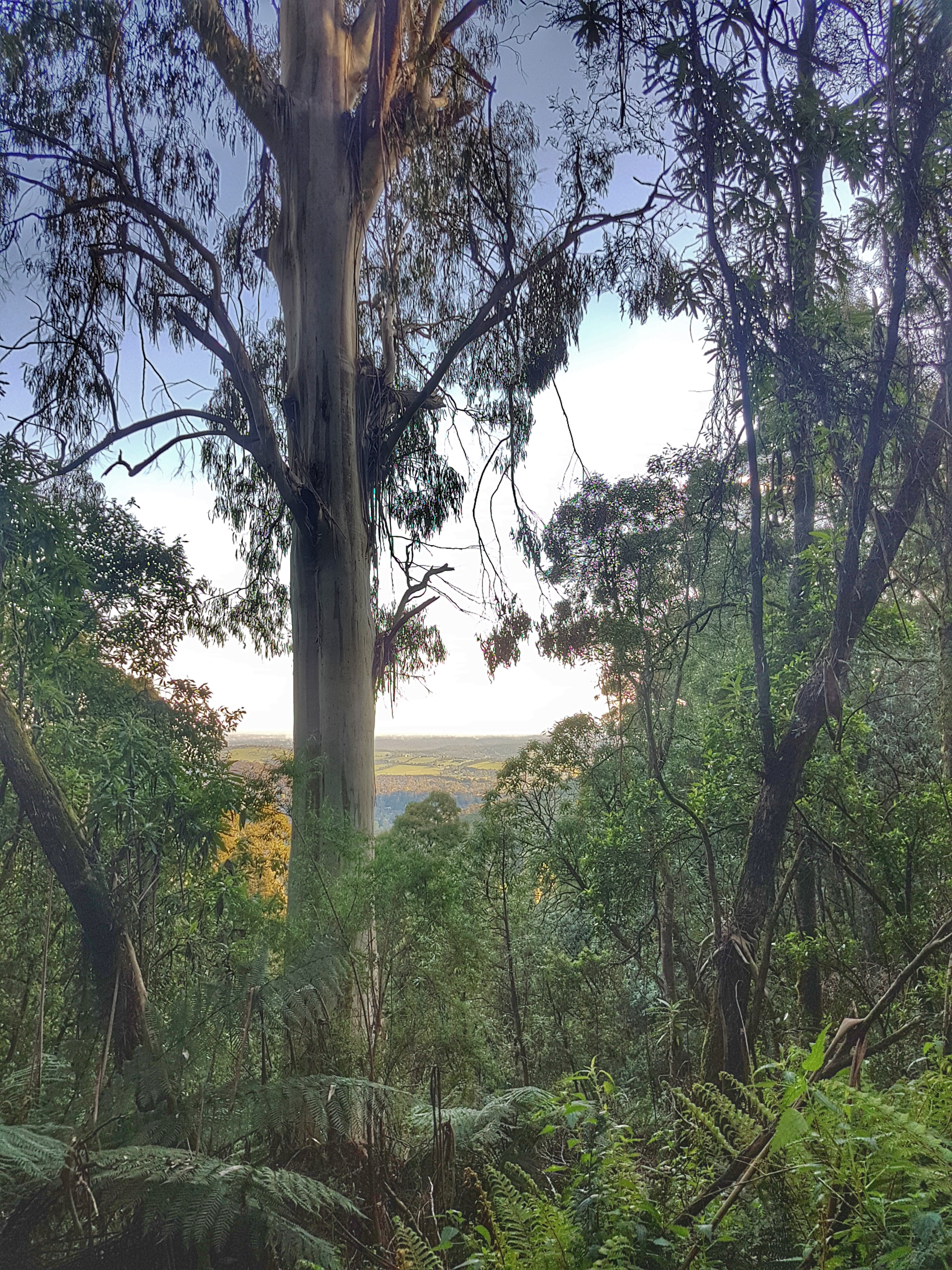
1000 Steps, Kokoda Track Memorial Walk, Dandenong Ranges National Park

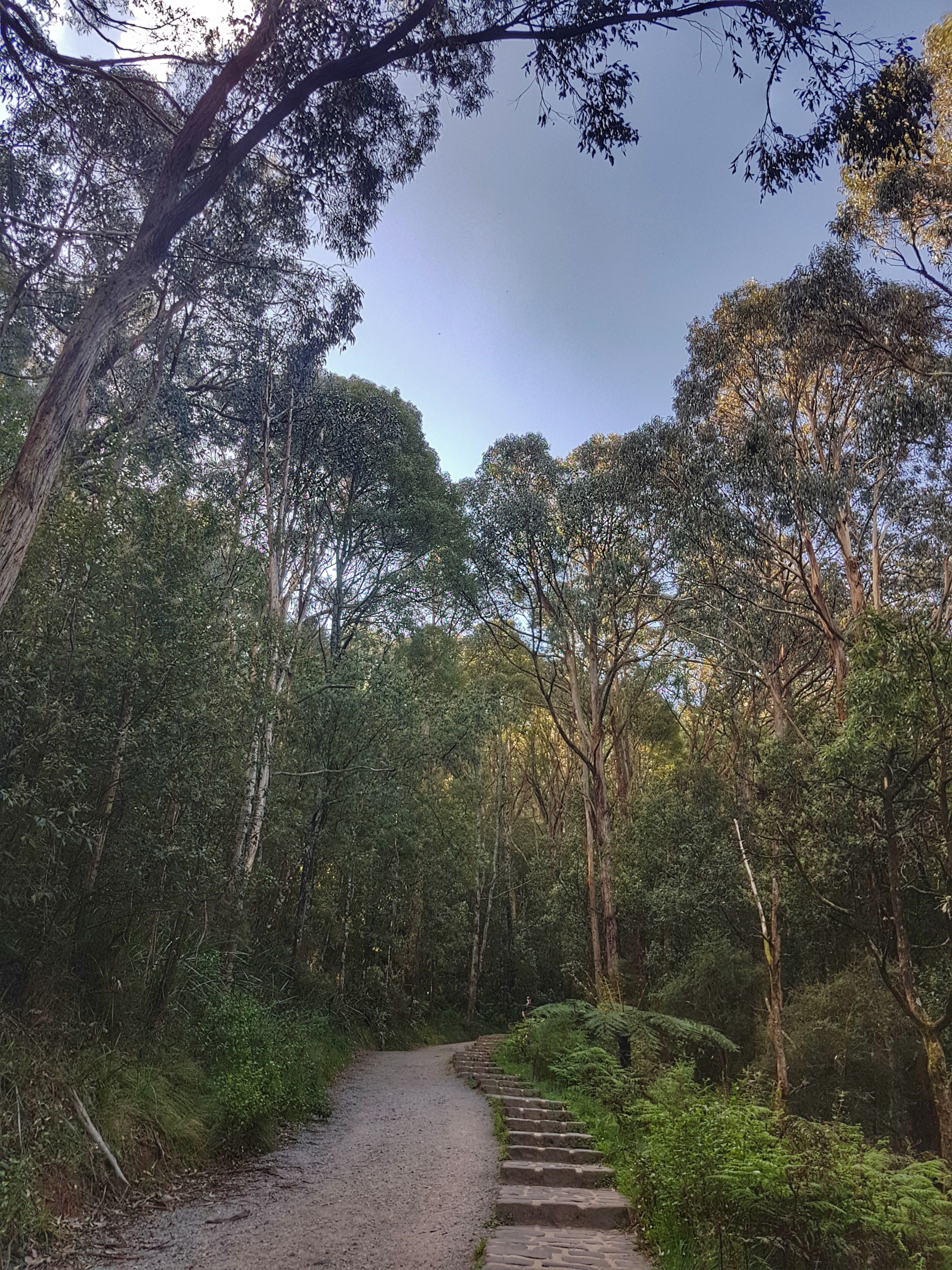
Lyrebird Track, Dandenong Ranges National Park

== Feral pests ==
Because the park is located in an urban area, the park has a long history of major problems with feral and roaming animals. A cat curfew was introduced in the entire Dandenong Ranges area in 1991, and since then the numbers and variety of lyrebirds and some other native species have climbed dramatically.

== See also ==
- Protected areas of Victoria
- List of national parks of Australia
