= Sassafras, Victoria =

Sassafras
- Town
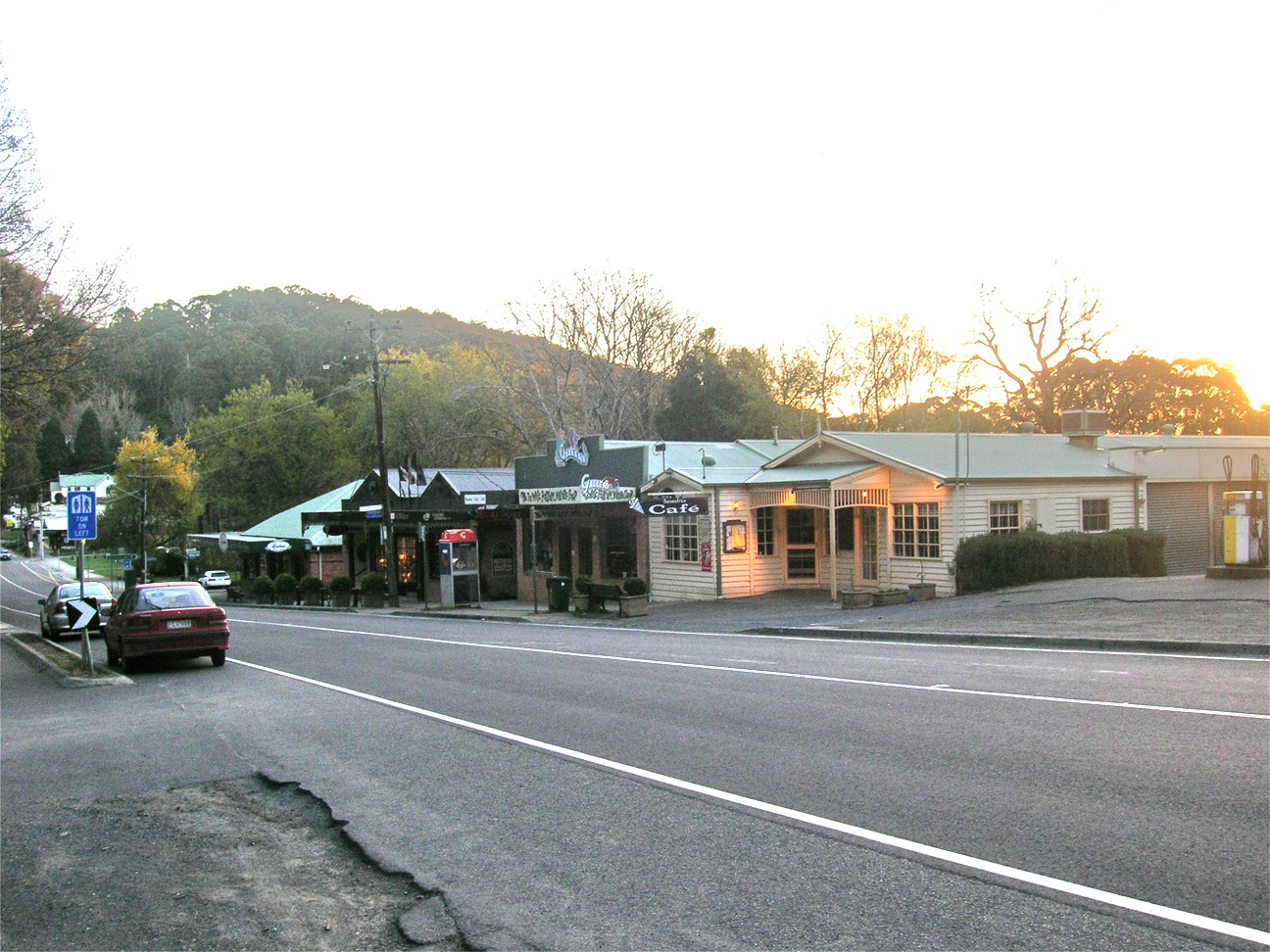
- Sassafras township

- Interactive map of Sassafras
- Coordinates: 37°52′12″S 145°21′14″E
- Country: Australia
- State: Victoria
- City: Melbourne
- LGAs: City of Knox; Shire of Yarra Ranges
- Location: 42 km (26 mi) from Melbourne; 6 km (3.7 mi) from Belgrave

Government
  - State electorate: Monbulk
  - Federal divisions: Aston; Casey

Area
  - Total: 3.3 km^{2} (1.3 sq mi)
- Elevation: 475 m (1,558 ft)

Population
  - Total: 970 (2021 census)
  - Density: 294/km^{2} (761/sq mi)
- Postcode: 3787
Localities around Sassafras
The Basin	Dandenong Ranges	Olinda
Ferny Creek	Sassafras	Olinda
Ferny Creek	Dandenong Ranges	Sherbrooke

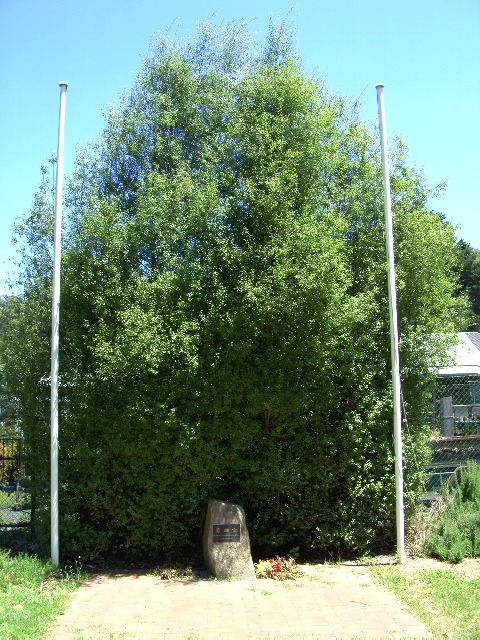
War memorial and garden

Sassafras (/sæsəfræs/) is a locality and township within Greater Melbourne, beyond the Melbourne metropolitan area Urban Growth Boundary, 43 km east of Melbourne's Central Business District, located within the City of Knox and Shire of Yarra Ranges local government areas. Sassafras recorded a population of 970 at the 2021 census.

== Location ==
The Sassafras village is located at an altitude of approximately 500 metres, in a saddle on the top of the ridgeline of the Dandenong Ranges, a few kilometres south of the highest peak of Mount Dandenong.

The locality of Sassafras extends from Hilton Road in the south, to just north of the village. In the east, it extends down the Sassafras Gully, whilst to the West much of the locality is within the Dandenong Ranges National Park.

== History ==
The area was named Sassafras Gully, after the sassafras trees which grow in gully along Sassafras Creek. The land was opened to small scale farming in 1893 and a small township developed. The Post Office opened on 1 June 1901 and has always been known as Sassafras Gully. The Sassafras Primary School was established in 1894, originally meeting in a bark slab hut, before relocating to the Sassafras Mechanics Institute hall in 1895. The school moved to its present site in 1915. In the early 1900s tourism began to increase and the township consequently grew. Artist Henrietta Maria Gulliver established a garden estate called Panteg there in 1915. Today Sassafras is a tourist destination with several boutique stores including Devonshire tea outlets, cafés, toy shops, antique shops and nurseries.

The area has had a history of bushfires, and areas near the town are known to have burnt since the 1850s, most recently in 1962.

== Waterways ==
Sassafras village is on the watershed between the Yarra River Catchment and the Dandenong Creek. Sassafras Creek is located to the east of the township while tributaries of the Dandenong Creek are west and north of the township. Both creeks provide important corridors for native flora and fauna, and are both largely protect by parklands.

Sassafras Creek flows generally east until it meets Ti-Tree Creek, where they join to form the Woori Yallock Creek. Woori-Yallock Creek then flows northward to eventually join the Yarra River next to the Warramate Nature Conservation Reserve. Sassafras Creek's Riparian Zone is almost entirely protected by public land, which in this case is Dandenong Ranges National Park.

Tributaries of the Dandenong Creek rise on the western face of the Dandenong Ranges and flow west to Dandenong Creek, where it flows southward into the Patterson River and then into Port Phillip Bay at Patterson Lakes.

== Natural environment ==
Sassafras Creek is protected by the Sassafras Creek Nature Conservation Reserve, which is nowadays incorporated into the Dandenong Ranges National Park. Sassafras has many exotic flora largely due to the fertile volcanic soils. Most private land contains exotic flora.

The Dandenong Ranges Tourist Track, a walking trail, runs for 15 km alongside the Sassafras Creek, past Kallista and Monbulk to Emerald.

== See also ==
- Shire of Sherbrooke – Sassafras was previously within this former local government area.
- Geography of the Yarra River
- Dandenong Creek Trail
