= Electoral results for the Division of La Trobe =

Australian division election results

This is a list of electoral results for the Division of La Trobe in Australian federal elections from the division's creation in 1949 until the present.

== Members ==
Member	Party	Term
Richard Casey	Liberal	1949–1960
John Jess	Liberal	1960 by–1972
Tony Lamb	Labor	1972–1975
Marshall Baillieu	Liberal	1975–1980
Peter Milton	Labor	1980–1990
Bob Charles	Liberal	1990–2004
Jason Wood	Liberal	2004–2010
Laura Smyth	Labor	2010–2013
Jason Wood	Liberal	2013–present

== Election results ==
=== Elections in the 2020s ===
==== 2025 ====
2025 Australian federal election: La Trobe
Party	Candidate	Votes	%	±%
Liberal	Jason Wood	40,547	39.13	−6.05
Labor	Jeff Springfield	33,289	32.13	+5.90
Greens	Jamie Longmuir	13,386	12.92	+2.00
One Nation	Leo Panetta	7,956	7.68	+2.63
Trumpet of Patriots	Gregory Hardiman	4,727	4.56	+3.58
Family First	Ron Malhotra	3,713	3.58	+3.58
Total formal votes		103,618	96.56	+1.29
Informal votes		3,689	3.44	−1.29
Turnout		107,307	92.97	+12.23
Two-party-preferred result
Liberal	Jason Wood	53,944	52.06	−6.37
Labor	Jeff Springfield	49,674	47.94	+6.37
Liberal hold		Swing	−6.37	

==== 2022 ====
2022 Australian federal election: La Trobe
Party	Candidate	Votes	%	±%
Liberal	Jason Wood	41,786	45.58	−0.20
Labor	Abi Kumar	23,918	26.09	−7.55
Greens	Michael Schilling	9,980	10.89	+3.32
United Australia	Merryn Mott	6,182	6.74	+3.80
One Nation	Hadden Ervin	4,555	4.97	−0.62
Animal Justice	Helen Jeges	2,450	2.67	+2.67
Liberal Democrats	Michael Abelman	1,911	2.08	+2.08
Federation	Rebecca Skinner	890	0.97	+0.97
Total formal votes		91,672	95.34	−0.11
Informal votes		4,483	4.66	+0.11
Turnout		96,155	90.89	+1.67
Two-party-preferred result
Liberal	Jason Wood	53,803	58.69	+3.56
Labor	Abi Kumar	37,869	41.31	−3.56
Liberal hold		Swing	+3.56	

Alluvial diagram for preference flows in the seat of La Trobe in the 2022 federal election. indicates at what stage the winning candidate had over 50% of the votes and was declared the winner.

=== Elections in the 2010s ===
==== 2019 ====
2019 Australian federal election: La Trobe
Party	Candidate	Votes	%	±%
Liberal	Jason Wood	45,123	45.72	+1.59
Labor	Simon Curtis	34,040	34.49	+2.35
Greens	Amy Gregorovich	7,752	7.86	−0.43
One Nation	Esther Baker	4,796	4.86	+4.86
Justice	Asher Calwell-Browne	3,525	3.57	+0.70
United Australia	Duncan Dean	2,506	2.54	+2.54
Rise Up Australia	Norman Baker	947	0.96	−1.01
Total formal votes		98,689	95.53	+1.21
Informal votes		4,616	4.47	−1.21
Turnout		103,305	93.30	+5.19
Two-party-preferred result
Liberal	Jason Wood	53,776	54.49	+1.27
Labor	Simon Curtis	44,913	45.51	−1.27
Liberal hold		Swing	+1.27	

==== 2016 ====
2016 Australian federal election: La Trobe
Party	Candidate	Votes	%	±%
Liberal	Jason Wood	39,108	42.23	−3.82
Labor	Simon Curtis	29,052	31.37	−0.69
Greens	Tom Cummings	9,773	10.55	+0.53
Justice	Julieanne Doidge	3,922	4.24	+4.24
Animal Justice	Leah Folloni	2,677	2.89	+2.89
Family First	Jeffrey Bartram	2,273	2.45	+0.56
Sex Party	Martin Leahy	2,103	2.27	−0.52
Shooters, Fishers, Farmers	David Fent	1,321	1.43	+1.43
Liberal Democrats	Leslie Hughes	1,188	1.28	+1.28
Rise Up Australia	Margaret Quinn	1,180	1.27	+0.47
Total formal votes		92,597	94.44	−1.17
Informal votes		5,454	5.56	+1.17
Turnout		98,051	92.74	−2.10
Two-party-preferred result
Liberal	Jason Wood	47,649	51.46	−2.55
Labor	Simon Curtis	44,948	48.54	+2.55
Liberal hold		Swing	−2.55	

==== 2013 ====
2013 Australian federal election: La Trobe
Party	Candidate	Votes	%	±%
Liberal	Jason Wood	40,925	46.05	+3.01
Labor	Laura Smyth	28,488	32.06	−7.35
Greens	Michael Schilling	8,905	10.02	−1.98
Palmer United	Jason Kennedy	4,514	5.08	+5.08
Sex Party	Martin Leahy	2,475	2.79	+0.46
Family First	Daniel Martin	1,680	1.89	−0.68
Democratic Labour	Rachel Jenkins	1,168	1.31	+1.31
Rise Up Australia	Kevin Seaman	711	0.80	+0.80
Total formal votes		88,866	95.61	−0.35
Informal votes		4,083	4.39	+0.35
Turnout		92,949	94.84	+0.41
Two-party-preferred result
Liberal	Jason Wood	47,998	54.01	+5.67
Labor	Laura Smyth	40,868	45.99	−5.67
Liberal gain from Labor		Swing	+5.67	

==== 2010 ====
2010 Australian federal election: La Trobe
Party	Candidate	Votes	%	±%
Liberal	Jason Wood	39,053	43.88	−2.60
Labor	Laura Smyth	33,970	38.17	−2.22
Greens	Jim Reiher	10,931	12.28	+3.44
Sex Party	Martin Leahy	2,539	2.85	+2.85
Family First	David Barrow	1,917	2.15	−0.69
Liberal Democrats	Shem Bennett	587	0.66	+0.56
Total formal votes		88,997	95.93	−0.79
Informal votes		3,773	4.07	+0.79
Turnout		92,770	94.70	−1.14
Two-party-preferred result
Labor	Laura Smyth	45,308	50.91	+1.42
Liberal	Jason Wood	43,689	49.09	−1.42
Labor gain from Liberal		Swing	+1.42	

=== Elections in the 2000s ===
==== 2007 ====
2007 Australian federal election: La Trobe
Party	Candidate	Votes	%	±%
Liberal	Jason Wood	39,636	46.48	−4.74
Labor	Rodney Cocks	34,448	40.39	+6.62
Greens	Bree Taylor	7,539	8.84	−0.57
Family First	Jim Zubic	2,423	2.84	+0.49
Democrats	Craig Beale	1,012	1.19	−0.30
Citizens Electoral Council	Kurt Beilharz	140	0.16	−0.01
Liberty & Democracy	Surome Singh	85	0.10	+0.10
Total formal votes		85,283	96.72	+0.74
Informal votes		2,896	3.28	−0.74
Turnout		88,179	95.82	+0.36
Two-party-preferred result
Liberal	Jason Wood	43,077	50.51	−5.32
Labor	Rodney Cocks	42,206	49.49	+5.32
Liberal hold		Swing	−5.32	

==== 2004 ====
2004 Australian federal election: La Trobe
Party	Candidate	Votes	%	±%
Liberal	Jason Wood	39,810	51.22	+4.68
Labor	Susan Davies	26,251	33.77	−0.45
Greens	Craig Smith	7,313	9.41	+2.01
Democrats	Tony Holland	1,160	1.49	−6.53
Family First	Darryl Bridges	1,830	2.35	+2.35
Independent	Frank Dean	777	1.00	+0.52
Christian Democrats	Wolf Voigt	459	0.59	−0.45
Citizens Electoral Council	Kurt Beilharz	131	0.17	+0.17
Total formal votes		77,731	95.98	+0.20
Informal votes		3,254	4.02	−0.20
Turnout		80,985	95.46	+0.59
Two-party-preferred result
Liberal	Jason Wood	43,394	55.83	+2.16
Labor	Susan Davies	34,337	44.17	−2.16
Liberal hold		Swing	+2.16	

==== 2001 ====
2001 Australian federal election: La Trobe
Party	Candidate	Votes	%	±%
Liberal	Bob Charles	37,641	46.59	+3.75
Labor	Philip Staindl	27,912	34.55	−3.22
Democrats	Tony Holland	6,424	7.95	−0.83
Greens	Craig Smith	5,740	7.10	+3.29
One Nation	June Scott	1,304	1.61	−2.71
Christian Democrats	Wolfgang Voigt	861	1.07	+0.06
Independent	Jason Allen	530	0.66	+0.66
Independent	Frank Dean	386	0.48	+0.03
Total formal votes		80,798	95.80	−0.59
Informal votes		3,544	4.20	+0.59
Turnout		84,342	95.92	
Two-party-preferred result
Liberal	Bob Charles	43,366	53.67	+2.68
Labor	Philip Staindl	37,432	46.33	−2.68
Liberal hold		Swing	+2.68	

=== Elections in the 1990s ===
==== 1998 ====
1998 Australian federal election: La Trobe
Party	Candidate	Votes	%	±%
Liberal	Bob Charles	31,456	42.84	−1.62
Labor	Carolyn Hirsh	27,733	37.77	−1.06
Democrats	Amanda Leeper	6,447	8.78	−0.67
One Nation	Jeff Thomas	3,173	4.32	+4.32
Greens	Robyn Holtham	2,801	3.81	−0.90
Christian Democrats	Wolf Voigt	740	1.01	−0.25
Unity	Assyl Haidar	411	0.56	+0.56
Independent	Frank Dean	331	0.45	−0.33
Abolish Child Support	Graham Woolley	186	0.25	+0.25
Natural Law	Andrew Stenberg	152	0.21	−0.31
Total formal votes		73,430	96.39	−1.08
Informal votes		2,751	3.61	+1.08
Turnout		76,181	96.10	−0.36
Two-party-preferred result
Liberal	Bob Charles	37,442	50.99	−0.38
Labor	Carolyn Hirsh	35,988	49.01	+0.38
Liberal hold		Swing	−0.38	

==== 1996 ====
1996 Australian federal election: La Trobe
Party	Candidate	Votes	%	±%
Liberal	Bob Charles	30,806	44.46	−2.90
Labor	Carolyn Hirsh	26,905	38.83	−3.28
Democrats	John Hastie	6,549	9.45	+5.02
Greens	John Benton	3,264	4.71	+1.04
Call to Australia	Wolf Voigt	874	1.26	+0.12
Independent	Frank Dean	542	0.78	+0.78
Natural Law	Andrew Stenberg	350	0.51	−0.11
Total formal votes		69,290	97.47	−0.16
Informal votes		1,799	2.53	+0.16
Turnout		71,089	96.45	+0.03
Two-party-preferred result
Liberal	Bob Charles	35,396	51.37	+0.10
Labor	Carolyn Hirsh	33,508	48.63	−0.10
Liberal hold		Swing	+0.10	

==== 1993 ====
1993 Australian federal election: La Trobe
Party	Candidate	Votes	%	±%
Liberal	Bob Charles	35,306	48.17	+4.49
Labor	Geoff Pain	29,715	40.54	+5.78
Greens	Rebecca Wigney	3,317	4.53	+4.53
Democrats	Raymond Jungwirth	3,106	4.24	−13.71
Call to Australia	Wolfgang Voigt	866	1.18	−2.44
Independent EFF	Peter Herbert	552	0.75	+0.75
Natural Law	Juliana Kendi	436	0.59	+0.59
Total formal votes		73,298	97.64	+0.06
Informal votes		1,772	2.36	−0.06
Turnout		75,070	96.42	
Two-party-preferred result
Liberal	Bob Charles	38,348	52.36	+1.01
Labor	Geoff Pain	34,893	47.64	−1.01
Liberal hold		Swing	+1.01	

==== 1990 ====
1990 Australian federal election: La Trobe
Party	Candidate	Votes	%	±%
Liberal	Bob Charles	29,805	43.7	+1.9
Labor	Peter Milton	23,720	34.8	−12.9
Democrats	Greta Jungwirth	12,246	17.9	+7.5
Call to Australia	Teresa Kemp	2,468	3.6	+3.6
Total formal votes		68,239	97.6	
Informal votes		1,690	2.4	
Turnout		69,929	96.8	
Two-party-preferred result
Liberal	Bob Charles	34,980	51.4	+5.6
Labor	Peter Milton	33,138	48.6	−5.6
Liberal gain from Labor		Swing	+5.6	

=== Elections in the 1980s ===
==== 1987 ====
1987 Australian federal election: La Trobe
Party	Candidate	Votes	%	±%
Labor	Peter Milton	31,510	50.8	−3.2
Liberal	Bob Charles	24,013	38.7	+2.3
Democrats	John Benton	6,461	10.4	+2.6
Total formal votes		61,984	95.2	
Informal votes		3,121	4.8	
Turnout		65,105	95.7	
Two-party-preferred result
Labor	Peter Milton	35,539	57.3	−1.4
Liberal	Bob Charles	26,439	42.7	+1.4
Labor hold		Swing	−1.4	

==== 1984 ====
1984 Australian federal election: La Trobe
Party	Candidate	Votes	%	±%
Labor	Peter Milton	28,853	54.0	+1.6
Liberal	Ted French	19,438	36.4	+2.0
Democrats	Andrew McCann	4,185	7.8	−2.7
Democratic Labor	Julie Garratt	976	1.8	+1.8
Total formal votes		53,452	92.1	
Informal votes		4,574	7.9	
Turnout		58,026	95.2	
Two-party-preferred result
Labor	Peter Milton	31,370	58.7	−1.8
Liberal	Ted French	22,077	41.3	+1.8
Labor hold		Swing	−1.8	

==== 1983 ====
1983 Australian federal election: La Trobe
Party	Candidate	Votes	%	±%
Labor	Peter Milton	40,493	52.8	+7.6
Liberal	Peter Nugent	26,045	34.0	−6.7
Democrats	Milton Blake	8,010	10.5	+0.1
Christian	Cornelis Hellema	2,085	2.7	+2.7
Total formal votes		76,633	98.2	
Informal votes		1,439	1.8	
Turnout		78,072	96.2	
Two-party-preferred result
Labor	Peter Milton		60.9	+8.6
Liberal	Peter Nugent		39.1	−8.6
Labor hold		Swing	+8.6	

==== 1980 ====
1980 Australian federal election: La Trobe
Party	Candidate	Votes	%	±%
Labor	Peter Milton	31,439	45.2	+4.9
Liberal	Marshall Baillieu	28,282	40.7	−0.9
Democrats	James Leicester	7,201	10.4	−3.7
United Christian	Cornelis Hellema	1,487	2.1	+2.1
Democratic Labor	Desmond Burke	867	1.2	−1.1
Independent	Wilhelm Kapphan	262	0.4	+0.4
Total formal votes		69,538	97.2	
Informal votes		2,015	2.8	
Turnout		71,553	95.4	
Two-party-preferred result
Labor	Peter Milton	36,360	52.3	+3.1
Liberal	Marshall Baillieu	33,178	47.7	−3.1
Labor gain from Liberal		Swing	+3.1	

=== Elections in the 1970s ===
==== 1977 ====
1977 Australian federal election: La Trobe
Party	Candidate	Votes	%	±%
Liberal	Marshall Baillieu	26,060	41.6	−8.9
Labor	Tony Lamb	25,250	40.3	−3.2
Democrats	Andrew McCann	8,827	14.1	+14.1
Democratic Labor	James Penna	1,410	2.3	+0.0
Independent	Cornelus Hellema	1,099	1.8	−0.4
Total formal votes		62,646	97.3	
Informal votes		1,725	2.7	
Turnout		64,371	95.9	
Two-party-preferred result
Liberal	Marshall Baillieu	31,845	50.8	−3.5
Labor	Tony Lamb	30,801	49.2	+3.5
Liberal hold		Swing	−3.5	

==== 1975 ====
1975 Australian federal election: La Trobe
Party	Candidate	Votes	%	±%
Liberal	Marshall Baillieu	41,276	50.5	+8.5
Labor	Tony Lamb	35,504	43.5	−9.4
Democratic Labor	James Penna	1,889	2.3	−0.4
Independent	Cornelus Hellema	1,837	2.2	+2.2
Australia	Don Walters	1,029	1.3	−0.7
Independent	Ronald Neilsen	169	0.2	+0.2
Total formal votes		18,704	98.0	
Informal votes		1,647	2.0	
Turnout		83,351	95.0	
Two-party-preferred result
Liberal	Marshall Baillieu		54.3	+8.9
Labor	Tony Lamb		45.7	−8.9
Liberal gain from Labor		Swing	−3.5	

==== 1974 ====
1974 Australian federal election: La Trobe
Party	Candidate	Votes	%	±%
Labor	Tony Lamb	40,444	52.9	+2.4
Liberal	Marshall Baillieu	32,126	42.0	+4.1
Democratic Labor	Daniel Mason	2,051	2.7	−2.5
Australia	Don Walters	1,501	2.0	−1.3
Independent	William Bryant	323	0.4	+0.4
Total formal votes		76,445	98.1	
Informal votes		1,467	1.9	
Turnout		77,912	95.0	
Two-party-preferred result
Labor	Tony Lamb		54.6	−0.4
Liberal	Marshall Baillieu		45.4	+0.4
Labor hold		Swing	−0.4	

==== 1972 ====
1972 Australian federal election: La Trobe
Party	Candidate	Votes	%	±%
Labor	Tony Lamb	31,885	50.5	+8.8
Liberal	John Jess	23,961	37.9	−6.7
Democratic Labor	George Noone	3,292	5.2	−3.6
Australia	Don Walters	2,083	3.3	−1.7
Defence of Government Schools	Eileen Fowler	1,238	2.0	+2.0
Independent	Jeffrey Gill	700	1.1	+1.1
Total formal votes		63,159	97.7	
Informal votes		1,505	2.3	
Turnout		64,664	96.0	
Two-party-preferred result
Labor	Tony Lamb		55.0	+10.2
Liberal	John Jess		45.0	−10.2
Labor gain from Liberal		Swing	−3.5	

=== Elections in the 1960s ===
==== 1969 ====
1969 Australian federal election: La Trobe
Party	Candidate	Votes	%	±%
Liberal	John Jess	22,343	44.6	−3.2
Labor	Pauline McCarthy	20,898	41.7	+9.6
Democratic Labor	Peter Tunstall	4,393	8.8	−4.0
Australia	Brenda Elliott	2,484	5.0	+5.0
Total formal votes		50,118	96.8	
Informal votes		1,658	3.2	
Turnout		51,776	94.9	
Two-party-preferred result
Liberal	John Jess	27,641	55.2	−5.7
Labor	Pauline McCarthy	22,477	44.8	+5.7
Liberal hold		Swing	−5.7	

==== 1966 ====
1966 Australian federal election: La Trobe
Party	Candidate	Votes	%	±%
Liberal	John Jess	38,427	47.6	−1.1
Labor	Don Pritchard	26,847	33.3	−7.6
Democratic Labor	Kevin Adamson	10,311	12.8	+2.4
Liberal Reform Group	Leonard Weber	5,075	6.3	+6.3
Total formal votes		80,660	97.0	
Informal votes		2,471	3.0	
Turnout		83,131	95.6	
Two-party-preferred result
Liberal	John Jess	48,873	60.6	+3.8
Labor	Don Pritchard	31,787	39.4	−3.8
Liberal hold		Swing	+3.8	

==== 1963 ====
1963 Australian federal election: La Trobe
Party	Candidate	Votes	%	±%
Liberal	John Jess	35,050	48.7	+5.0
Labor	Moss Cass	29,466	40.9	−1.1
Democratic Labor	Kevin Adamson	7,490	10.4	−3.1
Total formal votes		72,006	98.9	
Informal votes		797	1.1	
Turnout		72,803	96.8	
Two-party-preferred result
Liberal	John Jess	40,866	56.8	+0.2
Labor	Moss Cass	31,140	43.2	−0.2
Liberal hold		Swing	+0.2	

==== 1961 ====
1961 Australian federal election: La Trobe
Party	Candidate	Votes	%	±%
Liberal	John Jess	27,952	43.7	−10.0
Labor	Don Pritchard	26,875	42.0	+5.1
Democratic Labor	John Hoare	8,651	13.5	+4.2
Centre	Bernard Rees	554	0.9	+0.9
Total formal votes		64,032	97.9	
Informal votes		1,344	2.1	
Turnout		65,376	96.3	
Two-party-preferred result
Liberal	John Jess	36,236	56.6	−5.5
Labor	Don Pritchard	27,797	43.4	+5.5
Liberal hold		Swing	−5.5	

==== 1960 by-election ====
1960 La Trobe by-election
Party	Candidate	Votes	%	±%
Labor	Don Pritchard	23,387	43.7	+6.8
Liberal	John Jess	22,880	42.8	−10.9
Democratic Labor	John Martyr	6,834	12.8	+3.5
Republican	John Murray	406	0.8	+0.8
Total formal votes		53,507	98.4	
Informal votes		872	1.6	
Turnout		54,379	91.2	
Two-party-preferred result
Liberal	John Jess	28,999	54.2	−6.9
Labor	Don Pritchard	24,508	45.8	+6.9
Liberal hold		Swing	−6.9	

=== Elections in the 1950s ===
==== 1958 ====
1958 Australian federal election: La Trobe
Party	Candidate	Votes	%	±%
Liberal	Richard Casey	28,570	53.7	−3.9
Labor	Sam Goldbloom	19,623	36.9	+3.5
Democratic Labor	Terence Kirley	4,963	9.3	+0.3
Total formal votes		53,156	98.1	
Informal votes		1,031	1.9	
Turnout		54,187	95.9	
Two-party-preferred result
Liberal	Richard Casey		62.1	−2.7
Labor	Sam Goldbloom		37.9	+2.7
Liberal hold		Swing	−2.7	

==== 1955 ====
1955 Australian federal election: La Trobe
Party	Candidate	Votes	%	±%
Liberal	Richard Casey	24,442	57.6	+5.8
Labor	Bill Webber	14,177	33.4	−14.8
Labor (A-C)	George Noone	3,830	9.0	+9.0
Total formal votes		42,449	97.5	
Informal votes		1,101	2.5	
Turnout		43,550	94.5	
Two-party-preferred result
Liberal	Richard Casey		64.8	+13.0
Labor	Bill Webber		35.2	−13.0
Liberal hold		Swing	+13.0	

==== 1954 ====
1954 Australian federal election: La Trobe
Party	Candidate	Votes	%	±%
Liberal	Richard Casey	34,585	55.1	−2.9
Labor	Edward Smith	26,943	42.9	+0.9
Communist	Gerry O'Day	1,227	2.0	+2.0
Total formal votes		62,755	98.9	
Informal votes		699	1.1	
Turnout		63,454	96.5	
Two-party-preferred result
Liberal	Richard Casey		55.3	−2.7
Labor	Edward Smith		44.7	+2.7
Liberal hold		Swing	−2.7	

==== 1951 ====
1951 Australian federal election: La Trobe
Party	Candidate	Votes	%	±%
Liberal	Richard Casey	26,920	58.0	−0.6
Labor	Bernard Rees	19,464	42.0	+0.6
Total formal votes		46,384	98.1	
Informal votes		877	1.9	
Turnout		47,261	96.0	
Liberal hold		Swing	−0.6	

=== Elections in the 1940s ===
==== 1949 ====
1949 Australian federal election: La Trobe
Party	Candidate	Votes	%	±%
Liberal	Richard Casey	23,645	58.6	+4.1
Labor	Robert Balcombe	16,714	41.4	−4.1
Total formal votes		40,359	98.3	
Informal votes		698	1.7	
Turnout		41,057	94.6	
Liberal notional hold		Swing	+4.1	
