= Electoral results for the Division of Streeton =

Australian division election results

This is a list of electoral results for the Division of Streeton in Australian federal elections from the division's creation in 1984 until its abolition in 1990.

== Members ==
Member	Party	Term
Tony Lamb	Labor	1984–1990

== Election results ==
=== Elections in the 1980s ===
==== 1987 ====
1987 Australian federal election: Streeton
Party	Candidate	Votes	%	±%
Labor	Tony Lamb	29,038	46.7	−2.3
Liberal	Russell Broadbent	26,288	42.3	+3.1
Democrats	Rika Mason	5,063	8.1	+0.7
National	Ken Trembath	998	1.6	−1.2
Unite Australia	Tessa Cunningham	822	1.3	+1.3
Total formal votes		62,209	96.3	
Informal votes		2,393	3.7	
Turnout		64,602	95.5	
Two-party-preferred result
Labor	Tony Lamb	32,911	52.9	−0.4
Liberal	Russell Broadbent	29,275	47.1	+0.4
Labor hold		Swing	−0.4	

==== 1984 ====
1984 Australian federal election: Streeton
Party	Candidate	Votes	%	±%
Labor	Tony Lamb	27,239	49.0	+0.0
Liberal	Russell Broadbent	21,798	39.2	+0.3
Democrats	Tessa Cunningham	4,133	7.4	−1.1
National	John Clifford	1,538	2.8	+2.8
Democratic Labor	David Grulke	852	1.5	+0.4
Total formal votes		55,560	92.1	
Informal votes		4,766	7.9	
Turnout		60,326	94.7	
Two-party-preferred result
Labor	Tony Lamb	29,626	53.3	−0.9
Liberal	Russell Broadbent	25,920	46.7	+0.9
Labor notional hold		Swing	−0.9	
