= Cardinia =

Cardinia may refer to:

- Cardinia, Victoria, Australia
- Shire of Cardinia, Victoria, Australia
- Cardinia Creek, Australia
  - Cardinia Reservoir
  - Cardinia Dam Power Station
- Cardinia Transit, a bus and coach operator in Melbourne, Australia

== See also ==
- Kardinya, a suburb of Perth, Western Australia
