= Clematis, Victoria =

Clematis
- Town
- Interactive map of Clematis
- Coordinates: 37.929°S 145.423°E
- Country: Australia
- State: Victoria
- City: Melbourne
- LGA: Shire of Cardinia
- Location: 47 km (29 mi) from Melbourne; 8 km (5.0 mi) from Belgrave

Government
  - State electorate: Monbulk
  - Federal divisions: Casey; La Trobe

Population
  - Total: 352 (2021 census)
- Postcode: 3782
Localities around Clematis
The Patch	Kallista	Emerald
Menzies Creek	Clematis	Emerald
Cardinia Reservoir	Cardinia Reservoir	Emerald

Clematis is a town in Victoria, Australia, 42 km south-east from Melbourne's central business district, located within the Shire of Cardinia local government area. Clematis recorded a population of 352 at the 2021 census.

The town consists of a fire station, a pub, a railway station, a small hall and two shops. Clematis was featured in the 1978 Australian TV movie "The Death Train", starring Hugh Keays-Byrne.

== History ==
Clematis was first settled in the 1860s at the south eastern end of the Emerald goldfields, where the road from the goldfields to Emerald met the road from Melbourne and Dandenong. The area of the township was subdivided in 1902 as Paradise Valley (the name of which is retained in the town's Paradise Valley Hotel). The Clematis railway station (located behind and well below the hotel) was opened at the same time and given the name of Paradise Valley, shortened to Paradise in 1908, and then finally changed in 1921 to Clematis.

With the blockage of the Upper Ferntree Gully to Gembrook Narrow-gauge railway by a landslide between Selby and Menzies Creek in 1953, with its summer holiday traffic which the area had come to depend on (with its numerous guest houses), following the exhaustion of the timber resources during the Second World War, and the subsequent closure of many sawmills, declined. The railway was reopened by the Puffing Billy Preservation Society through Clematis to Emerald in 1965. However, Clematis station with its loop siding is primarily used for loading timber for the railway's locomotive fleet and only stops for passengers when requested.

The construction of the Cardinia Reservoir, flooded, or otherwise displaced over half farming land area of the Clematis township and as a result the township further declined after 1965.

Clematis Post Office opened around 1907 and subsequently closed in 1978, with its services transferred to neighbouring Emerald, Victoria and, along with it, a postcode change from 3159 to 3782.

== Clematis Fire Brigade ==
Clematis Fire Brigade is a brigade of the Country Fire Authority providing a volunteer fire fighting service for over half of Cardinia Reservoir. It was formed in 1936 and celebrated its 70th anniversary in 2006. The brigade attends approximately 100 emergency calls per year. Since the brigade's formation it has fought most major blazes across Victoria, including the Ash Wednesday fires. The brigade has also fought major blazes interstate in New South Wales. The brigade trains on Wednesday evenings from 7:30 p.m. and new members are always welcome.

== See also ==
- Shire of Sherbrooke – Clematis was previously within this former local government area.
- Clematis railway station
