= Division of La Trobe =

Australian federal electoral division

Coordinates: 37.971°S 145.424°E

La Trobe Australian House of Representatives Division
- Interactive map of electorate boundaries from the 2025 federal election
- Created: 1949
- MP: Jason Wood
- Party: Liberal
- Namesake: Charles La Trobe
- Electors: 115,448 (2025)
- Area: 1,303 km^{2} (503.1 sq mi)
- Demographic: Provincial

The Division of La Trobe is an Australian electoral division in the state of Victoria.

The division was created in 1949 and was initially located in the eastern suburbs of Melbourne and parts of Dandenong Ranges. Over time, it had gradually shifted south as a result of multiple redistributions and boundary changes. As of 2025, it is a semi-urban electorate that covers the majority of Shire of Cardinia and a small portion of City of Casey, extending from the outer south-eastern suburbs of Melbourne to the westernmost areas of Gippsland. It fully incorporates the suburbs of Beaconsfield, Officer and Pakenham, the majority of Clyde North, and south-eastern portions of Berwick. The division also covers towns beyond the metropolitan area such as Beaconsfield Upper, Bunyip, Cockatoo, Emerald, Garfield, Gembrook, Koo Wee Rup, Lang Lang, Nar Nar Goon and Pakenham Upper.

== Geography ==
Since 1984, federal electoral division boundaries in Australia have been determined at redistributions by a redistribution committee appointed by the Australian Electoral Commission. Redistributions occur for the boundaries of divisions in a particular state, and they occur every seven years, or sooner if a state's representation entitlement changes or when divisions of a state are malapportioned.

When the division was created in 1949, it covered a wide area of the eastern and south-east Melbourne as well as the Dandenong Ranges, replacing parts of Division of Deakin and Division of Flinders. It extended up to Ringwood, Croydon, Mount Evelyn and Seville to the north, Box Hill South, Burwood, Mount Waverley and Clayton to the west, Dingley Village, Springvale, Dandenong and Rowville to the south, and Belgrave, Emerald and Monbulk to the east. Towards the centre of the division, it also included Knoxfield, Glen Waverley, Bayswater, Ferntree Gully and Mount Dandenong.

In 1955, the division lost all areas west of Dandenong Creek between Wantirna and Rowville, but gained Blackburn, Nundawading and Mitcham. In 1968, it lost areas west of Ringwood (inclusive) to the new Division of Casey but was massively expanded north-east to include the Yarra Valley, replacing a huge portion of the Division of Deakin. It extended up to Marysville, and included the towns of Healesville, Yarra Junction and Warburton, but stopping short of Yarra Glen. The gains at Yarra Valley were reversed in 1977, which became part of Division of Casey and Division of McMillan.

In 1984, the division shifted south to include most of City of Berwick (previously part of Division of Holt), and losing most of its areas in the Shire of Lillydale and City of Knox to the new divisions of Streeton and Aston respectively. In 1989, when Streeton was abolished, La Trobe regained most of these lost areas in the Shire of Lillydale, gained Gembrook, but lost Endeavour Hills and Narre Warren North. In 1994, it lost most of its areas in the Shire of Lillydale again (the Shire also became part of Shire of Yarra Ranges that year). It also expanded slightly to the south that year to include Officer South, and then again in 2003 to include Clyde North. It had a minor boundary change in 2010, losing Boronia and gained Narre Warren South.

In 2018, the division was shifted east and lost all areas within the City of Knox and Shire of Yarra Ranges to the Divisions of Aston and Casey respectively. This included areas west of Menzies Creek (inclusive) such as Mount Dandenong, Belgrave and Ferntree Gully. However, the division gained Pakenham, Nar Nar Goon and the unpopulated Bunyip State Park from the abolished Division of McMillan. In 2021, the division was expanded south to meet the Western Port to include almost all of Shire of Cardinia, and included the towns of Bunyip, Koo Wee Rup and Lang Lang previously in the Division of Monash. It underwent a minor boundary change in 2024, losing Harkaway and the portion of Berwick north of Princes Freeway.

As of the 2024 redistribution, the division includes the majority of Shire of Cardinia (except Clematis and Avonsleigh near Menzies Creek, and a portion of Beaconsfield) and a small section of City of Casey (Berwick and Clyde North). It shares at least 90% of its boundaries with the Shire of Cardinia boundaries. The division today, as of 2025, only covers a small portion of its original areas from 1949. The only area to be within the division the entire time since 1949 is a north-western portion of the Cardinia Reservoir. The nearby town of Emerald is also in the division for almost the entire time, except a brief period between 1984 and 1988.

== History ==
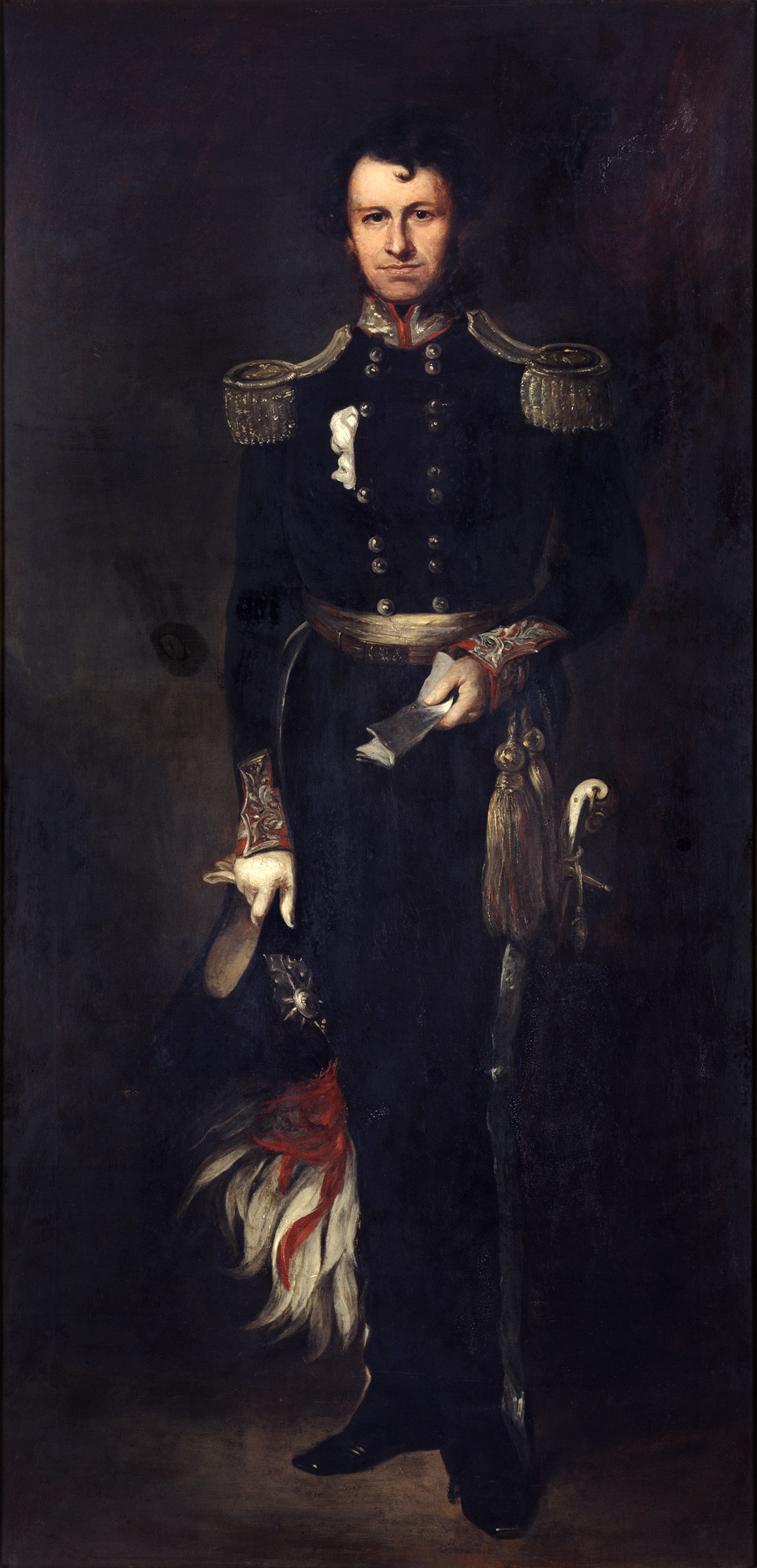
Charles La Trobe, the division's namesake

The division was proclaimed at the redistribution of 11 May 1949, and was first contested at the 1949 election. It was named after Charles La Trobe, the first Lieutenant-Governor of Victoria. It was originally located closer to the city, but redistributions moved it further south-east. It originally included the suburbs of Croydon, Dandenong, Ferntree Gully and Ringwood.

The first person to hold the seat was Richard Casey, Baron Casey, later the sixteenth Governor-General of Australia and the last of three Australian politicians to be elevated to the British House of Lords. The Division of Casey, which borders this division to the north, is named after him. In 1961, the division was the subject of a book, Parties and People: A Survey Based on the La Trobe Electorate, by Creighton Burns.

== Members ==
| Image | Member | Party | Term | Notes |
|---|---|---|---|---|
| | Richard Casey (1890–1976) | Liberal | 10 December 1949 – 10 February 1960 | Previously held the Division of Corio. Served as minister under Menzies. Resigned to take up a seat in the British House of Lords |
| | John Jess (1922–2003) | Liberal | 9 April 1960 – 2 December 1972 | Lost seat |
| | Tony Lamb (1939–) | Labor | 2 December 1972 – 13 December 1975 | Lost seat. Later elected to the Division of Streeton in 1984 |
| | Marshall Baillieu (1937–) | Liberal | 13 December 1975 – 18 October 1980 | Lost seat |
| | Peter Milton (1928–2009) | Labor | 18 October 1980 – 24 March 1990 | Lost seat |
| | Bob Charles (1936–2016) | Liberal | 24 March 1990 – 31 August 2004 | Retired |
| | Jason Wood (1968–) | Liberal | 9 October 2004 – 21 August 2010 | Lost seat |
| | Laura Smyth (1976–) | Labor | 21 August 2010 – 7 September 2013 | Lost seat |
| | Jason Wood (1968–) | Liberal | 7 September 2013 – present | Incumbent |

== Election results ==
2025 Australian federal election: La Trobe
| Party | Candidate | Votes | % | ±% |
|---|---|---|---|---|
| Liberal | Jason Wood | 40,547 | 39.13 | −6.05 |
| Labor | Jeff Springfield | 33,289 | 32.13 | +5.90 |
| Greens | Jamie Longmuir | 13,386 | 12.92 | +2.00 |
| One Nation | Leo Panetta | 7,956 | 7.68 | +2.63 |
| Trumpet of Patriots | Gregory Hardiman | 4,727 | 4.56 | +3.58 |
| Family First | Ron Malhotra | 3,713 | 3.58 | +3.58 |
| Total formal votes | | 103,618 | 96.56 | +1.29 |
| Informal votes | | 3,689 | 3.44 | −1.29 |
| Turnout | | 107,307 | 92.97 | +12.23 |
Two-party-preferred result
| Liberal | Jason Wood | 53,944 | 52.06 | −6.37 |
| Labor | Jeff Springfield | 49,674 | 47.94 | +6.37 |
| Liberal hold | | Swing | −6.37 | |
