= Macclesfield, Victoria =

Macclesfield
- Town
- Interactive map of Macclesfield
- Coordinates: 37.883°S 145.477°E
- Country: Australia
- State: Victoria
- LGA: Shire of Yarra Ranges
- Location: 57 km (35 mi) from Melbourne; 20 km (12 mi) from Belgrave

Government
  - State electorate: Monbulk
  - Federal division: Casey
- Elevation: 154 m (505 ft)

Population
  - Total: 878 (2021 census)
- Postcode: 3782
Localities around Macclesfield
Monbulk	Silvan	Yellingbo
Kallista	Macclesfield	Cockatoo
Emerald	Avonsleigh	Cockatoo

Macclesfield is a town in Victoria, Australia, 47 km east of Melbourne's central business district, located within the Shire of Yarra Ranges local government area. Macclesfield recorded a population of 878 at the 2021 census.

The community facilities within Macclesfield include the Macclesfield Rural Fire Brigade, Primary School, Macclesfield Hall and Macclesfield Community Church. The locality, which was named after Macclesfield in England, was briefly the scene of mining activities after gold was discovered in Macclesfield Creek in 1865. The Post Office opened on 9 September 1891 and closed in 1974.

The town is known for its rich soil used for growing flowers and potatoes, and its abundance of uncommon farm animals, such as goats and alpacas. It was featured in one of MMM Melbourne's suburban songs performed by "The Scared Weird Little Guys".
