= Menzies Creek =

- Town
- Interactive map of Menzies Creek
- Coordinates: 37.931°S 145.398°E
- Country: Australia
- State: Victoria
- City: Melbourne
- LGAs: Shire of Cardinia; Shire of Yarra Ranges
- Location: 40 km (25 mi) from Melbourne; 4 km (2.5 mi) from Belgrave

Government
  - State electorate: Monbulk
  - Federal divisions: Casey; La Trobe

Population
  - Total: 966 (2021 census)
- Postcode: 3159
Localities around Menzies Creek
Kallista	The Patch	Kallista
Selby	Menzies Creek	Clematis
Belgrave South	Cardinia Reservoir	Clematis

Menzies Creek is a town in Victoria, Australia, 40 km east of Melbourne's Central Business District, located within the Shires of Cardinia and Yarra Ranges local government areas. Menzies Creek recorded a population of 966 at the 2021 census.

Menzies' Creek Post Office opened on 2 May 1887 and closed in 1980.

Menzies Creek railway station opened on 18 December 1900 with the opening of the Gembrook line. The station name was changed to Aura on 5 December 1904—while the Post Office remained Menzies Creek—but reverted to Menzies Creek on 4 July 1947.

The area is named after James Menzies, a gold digger in the 1860s, who worked the area for many years and is believed to be buried locally.

== Schools ==
Menzies Creek Primary School is a small school with a distinctive community focus.

== Reserves ==
Menzies Creek Reserve, with two soccer pitches in winter (Monbulk Rangers Soccer Club) and a cricket oval in summer. The 1st Selby Scout Troop has its headquarters here.

== See also ==
- Shire of Sherbrooke – Menzies Creek was previously within this former local government area.
- Menzies Creek railway station
