= Dandenong Ranges Botanic Garden =

Botanical garden

Coordinates: 37.8522°S 145.369°E

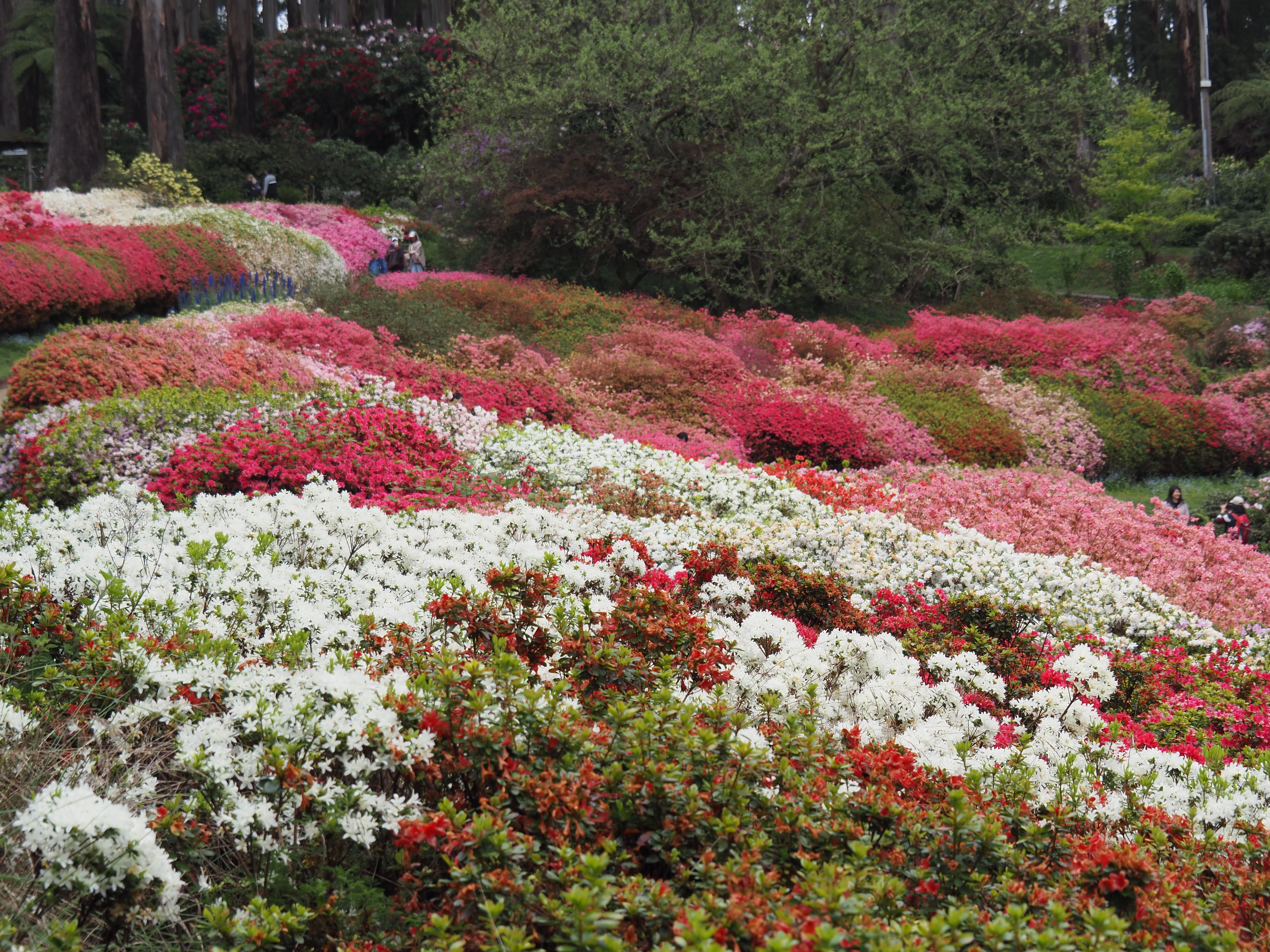
- Interactive map of Dandenong Ranges Botanic Garden
- Type: Botanic Garden
- Location: Olinda, Victoria, Australia
- Area: 42 hectares (100 acres)
- Opened: 1960
- Operator: Parks Victoria
- Visitors: 190,000
- Open: Daily: 10am - 4:30pm
- Vegetation: rhododendrons, azaleas, camellias, daffodils, cherry trees
- Facilities: Information centre, gift shop, toilets, shelters, picnic areas
- Website: https://www.parks.vic.gov.au/places-to-see/parks/dandenong-ranges-botanic-garden

The Dandenong Ranges Botanic Garden, formerly known as the National Rhododendron Gardens, is a botanical garden in Olinda, Victoria, Australia.

The gardens are known for their rhododendrons, azaleas, camellias, cherries and daffodils. The collection includes more than 50,000 plants, some of which are rare or endangered. There are also some smaller gardens, like the Japanese Garden. In September and early October, the cherry blossoms are in bloom in Cherry Tree Grove.

== Setting ==
The gardens are located adjacent to the Dandenong Ranges National Park, near Olinda, at an elevation of almost 600 metres (2,000 ft) above sea level. The site faces north-east and receives around 1,200 millimetres (47 in) of rainfall annually. The soils are mostly volcanic, free draining and mildly acid. These conditions are ideal for rhododendrons.

== History ==
The Australian Rhododendron Society was established in Victoria in 1960, and in that same year it approached the government seeking the allocation of land for a rhododendron garden. A site in the Dandenong Ranges was chosen because it receives between two and three times the annual rainfall of Melbourne, and is on average five degrees cooler. The society was granted a lease of 100 acres (40 ha) of State Government land adjacent to the town of Olinda, by the State Premier Henry Bolte.

The area of the gardens was largely destroyed in a major bushfire in the Dandenong Ranges and the outskirts of Melbourne between 14 and 17 January 1962. Most of the mountain ash (Eucalyptus regnans) trees in the area were burned to the ground, and the trees now present in the garden have grown since the time of the fire. Although the initial plantings were largely destroyed in the fire, the area where the gardens were to be developed was cleared of bush.

Members of the Rhododendron Society contributed to many of the early plantings using cuttings from their own collections and from plant material and seeds sent from other national and international collections. Some further specimens were collected during visits to Nepal, India and New Guinea.

The ornamental lake in the gardens was built in 1969. The Cherry Tree Grove was officially opened on 13 October 1995 with a ceremonial planting of a tree by Prince and Princess Akishino of Japan.

In 2013, the State Government published plans for the garden that included a proposed name change to include the word "botanic" in the title. In 2017, it was announced that the former Olinda golf course that had been abandoned for 5 years, would be converted into parkland and become part of the gardens, and the name of the gardens would be changed to Dandenong Ranges Botanic Garden.

In 2021, it was announced that the State Government would fund the construction of an Australian Garden immediately adjacent to the Dandenong Ranges Botanic Garden, on 4,000 square metres (43,000 sq ft) of land that was part of the former Olinda Golf Course. The new garden is to be a large scale replica of the exhibit at the London Chelsea Flower Show in 2013 by landscape designer Phillip Johnson and his collaborator Wes Fleming that won the best in show title.
