= Olinda, Victoria =

Olinda
- Suburb
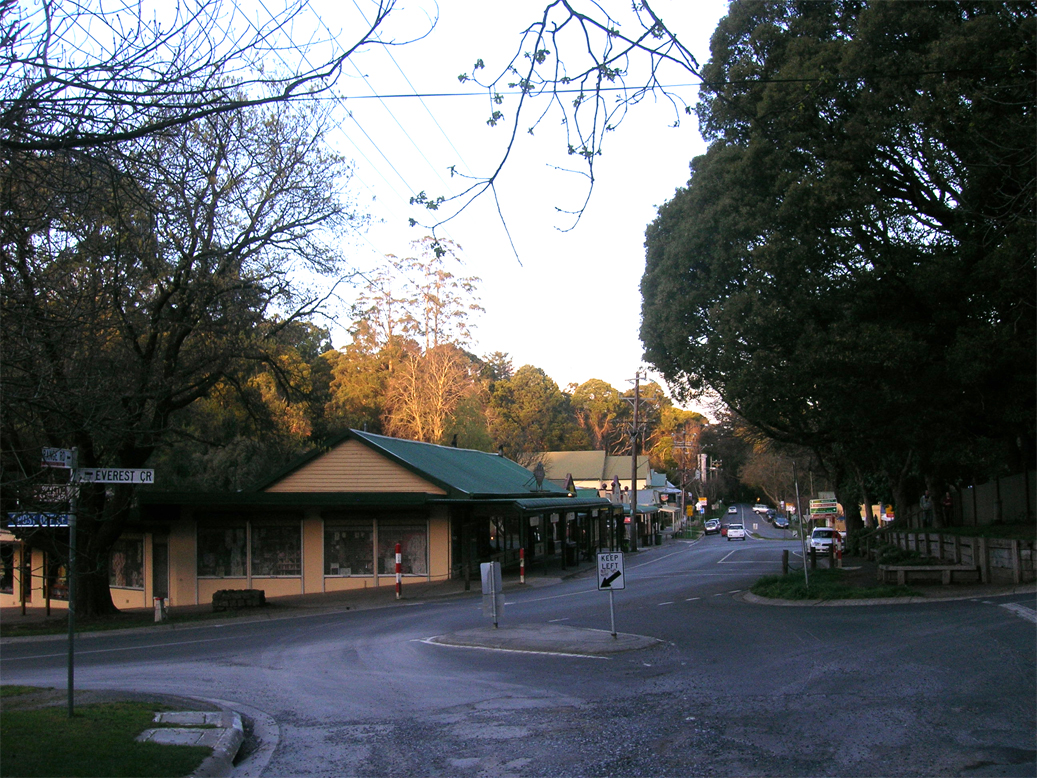
- Olinda township

- Interactive map of Olinda
- Coordinates: 37.85599°S 145.364357°E
- Country: Australia
- State: Victoria
- City: Melbourne
- LGA: Shire of Yarra Ranges
- Location: 41 km (25 mi) E of Melbourne CBD; 14 km (8.7 mi) N of Belgrave

Government
  - State electorate: Monbulk
  - Federal division: Casey

Area
  - Total: 5.8 km^{2} (2.2 sq mi)
- Elevation: 569 m (1,867 ft)

Population
  - Total: 1,773 (2021 census)
  - Density: 305.7/km^{2} (792/sq mi)
- Postcode: 3788
Suburbs around Olinda
Mount Dandenong	Kalorama	Silvan
Sassafras	Olinda	Monbulk
Sherbrooke	Kallista	The Patch

Olinda (/oʊˈlɪndə/ oh-LIN-də) is a town within the Dandenong Ranges in central-south Victoria, Australia, located 41 km (25 mi) east of Melbourne's CBD, located within the Shire of Yarra Ranges local government area. Olinda recorded a population of 1,773 at the 2021 census.

It is a popular weekend destination for tourists, with a variety of restaurants and cafes. The town is home to the Dandenong Ranges Botanic Garden and R.J. Hamer Arboretum.

== History ==
Olinda is named after Olinda Creek, which begins in the township. The creek was named in 1858 after Alice Olinda Hodgkinson, the daughter of Clement Hodgkinson, Victoria's acting Surveyor General. The town was initially a logging settlement, however as land was made available for horticulture in the early 1900s, the town began to grow substantially. The Post Office opened on 21 August 1901. Berry farming, dairying, and flower growing became prosperous industries, and tourism soon flourished as the principal industry of Olinda.

In 1919 the Australian artist Sir Arthur Streeton returned to Australia and built a house on the property called Longacres, in Olinda. Guesthouses and weekend homes became a common staple for the area, allowing for the township to enter a prosperous period of guest house tourism. The popularity of guesthouses and weekend cottages in the town lasted until World War II. After which, the rise of motor vehicle transportation saw a decline in weekend trips, and a rise in day trips by motor vehicle. In 1966 the Ashendene Boys Home was located in Olinda, until its closure in 1988.

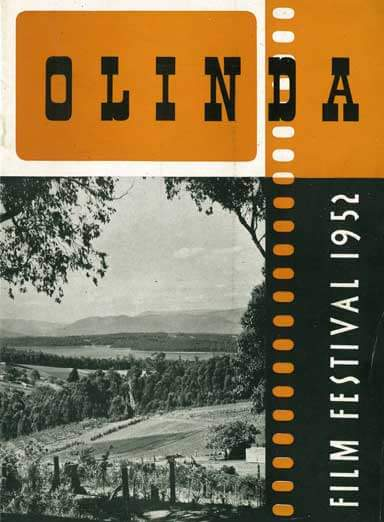
Olinda Film Festival 1952

In 1952 Olinda hosted the Olinda Film Festival (also called the Melbourne Film Festival and the convention of Australian Council of Film Societies).

The first 9-hole Olinda Golf course, to the east of the township, sat on State Forests and was established in 1933 but fell into disuse during the war. There was renewed interest in the 1940s and a new club formed in 1952, but it closed in 1961. Following the 1962 bushfires, there was significant investment by the Forests Commission Victoria in expanding and upgrading the course because it doubled as an important firebreak and buffer to the township of Olinda. New facilities were built and the course extended to 18-holes. A third golf club formed in 1968 but it later closed in about 2012. In 2017, the Victorian Government announced that the site of the former golf club would be converted into parklands and gardens, along with the expansion of the rhododendron gardens into the new Dandenong Ranges Botanic Gardens.

=== Heritage listing ===
The following place in Olinda is listed on the Victorian Heritage Register:

- Longacres, 5 Range Road, built for Sir Arthur Streeton

== Demographics ==
At the 2016 census, Olinda had a population of 1,738 people. The median age of the Olinda population was 44 years of age, compared to the Australian average of 38. 74.9% of residents were born in Australia, compared to the Australian average of 66.7%. The other top responses for country of birth were England 7.2% and New Zealand 1.7%. When asked about religion, the most frequent response was "No Religion" (50%), followed by Catholic (12%), and Anglican (10%).

== Economy ==
Olinda is a popular tourist destination in the Dandenong Ranges, home to cafes, restaurants, antique and craft shops, and numerous art galleries, showcasing local, national, and international artists in such areas as sculpture and painting. The town is surrounded by a number of walking trails and natural waterfalls, including the Olinda Falls & Cascade Walk. The Dandenong Ranges Botanic Garden is situated to the east of the town.

== Sport ==
Together with the neighbouring township of Ferny Creek, Olinda has both Australian Rules football and netball teams competing in the Outer East Football and Netball League.

== Media ==
Olinda receives all Melbourne TV and Radio Channels, as it is very close to the Transmission towers, which are West of Olinda. However, being near the Transmitters and in the hills, Olinda also receives channels from Gippsland, and some from Bendigo. TV operators are ABC, SBS, Seven Network (Melbourne), Nine Network (Melbourne), Ten Network (Melbourne), Southern Cross Nine (Gippsland and Bendigo), Prime7 (Gippsland and Bendigo), WIN Network (Gippsland and Bendigo), 7TWO (Melbourne, Gippsland, Bendigo), 7mate (Melbourne, Gippsland, Bendigo).
