= Ashendene Boys Home =

Home for boys in Victoria, Australia 1966 to 1988

- Interactive map of Ashendene Boys Home
- Location: Olinda, Victoria; 37°50′33.22″S 145°22′10.62″E
- Status: Closed
- Opened: 1966
- Closed: November 1988
- Managed by: Social Welfare Branch, Social Welfare Department, later Community Services Victoria

Ashendene Boys Home was a former home for boys admitted to care of the Victorian Government in Australia. The centre operated between 1966 and 1988 and was initially managed by the Social Welfare Branch, later the Social Welfare Department, the Department of Community Welfare Services, and Community Services Victoria. Located in Olinda, Victoria, the centre accommodated boys aged from 10 to 15 years following a breakdown in home release, foster care or a children's home placement.

== History and facilities ==
The Victorian Government purchased the large former private home to house boys aged from 10 to 15 years, and address overcrowding at Allambie and Turana Reception Centres.

It was proposed by the Department that Ashendene be used in conjunction with Hillside Boys' Home in Glen Waverley with both institutions taking boys with a long history of institutional care and some offending behaviour. Unlike Hillside, boys at Ashendene were able to attend local schools. By 1977, Ashendene's main intake was from Baltara Reception Centre, older teenage boys requiring longer term accommodation. In 1978 the capacity of the Home was reduced to 24 as the building was considered to be overcrowded. In November 1988, Ashendene was relocated to a new facility in Croydon - a regional medium term residential unit for up to eight male and female adolescents.
