= Clematis railway station =

Railway station in Victoria, Australia

Clematis
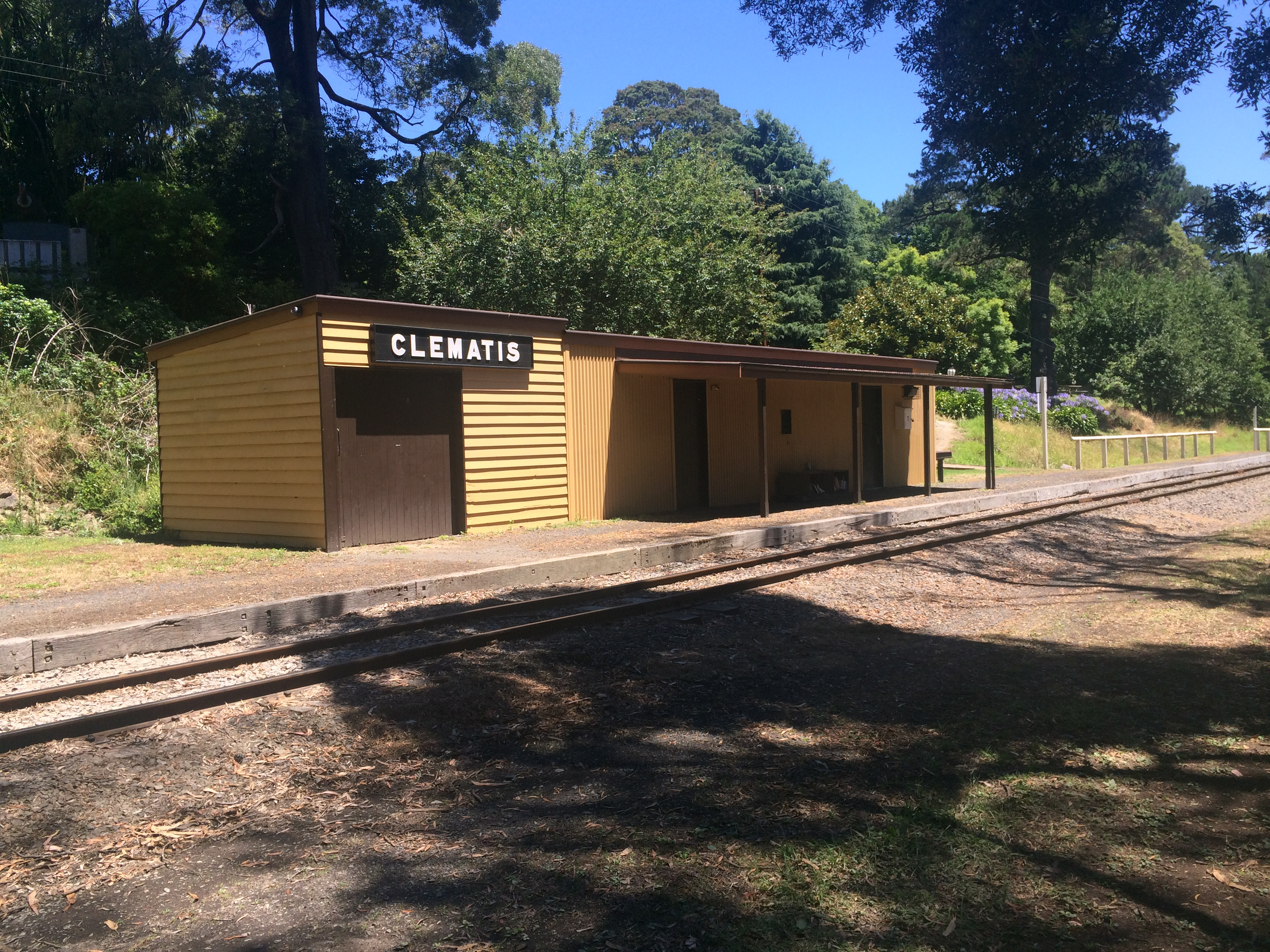
- Clematis station and platform, January 2022.

General information
- Location: Emerald VIC 3782; Australia
- Coordinates: 37°55′42″S 145°25′25″E
- Elevation: 276 m (906 ft)
- System: Puffing Billy Railway station
- Lines: Puffing Billy Railway; Gembrook railway line (former)
- Distance: 49.77 km (30.93 mi) from Flinders Street
- Platforms: 1
- Tracks: 2

Other information
- Status: Unstaffed

History
- Opened: 10 March 1902; 124 years ago
- Former names: Paradise Valley; Paradise

Services
| Preceding station | Puffing Billy Railway | Following station |
|---|---|---|
| Menzies Creek towards Belgrave | Gembrook line | Emerald towards Gembrook |
Former services
| Preceding station | VicRail | Following station |
|---|---|---|
| Menzies Creek towards Upper Ferntree Gully | Gembrook line | Emerald towards Gembrook |
Location

Clematis railway station is a narrow-gauge tourist heritage railway station operated by the Puffing Billy Railway in Victoria, Australia. Located in Emerald near its border with the town of Clematis, it opened on 10 March 1902 as an unnamed stop on the Gembrook line. It was later renamed to Paradise Valley, Paradise, and finally Clematis.

After the Gembrook line's closure in 30 April 1954, Clematis reopened to passengers on the heritage service on 25 October 1966. The station consists of a single platform with a small station building; it also features a small staff-operated loop siding with a dead end spur just down-line from the station building. Trains rarely stop here, except by prior arrangement such as for groups travelling to the Paradise Hotel behind the station.

== Description ==
Clematis railway station is in the town of Emerald, Victoria, Australia, near its border with the town Clematis. It sits behind and below the Paradise Valley Hotel, a long-standing local public house on Belgrave–Gembrook Road. Prior to 2023 extension works, Clematis station was also one terminus of the Eastern Dandenong Ranges Trail (colloquially the Puffing Billy Trail).

The station is one of few in Victoria not belonging to VicTrack; instead, it is owned and operated by the Puffing Billy Railway Board, and is serviced by heritage steam locomotives on the Puffing Billy Railway. It is 49.77 km (30.93 mi) from Flinders Street Station and approximately 7.7 km (4.8 mi) from the start of its line in Belgrave. Clematis station lies between Menzies Creek (up-line towards Belgrave) and Emerald (down-line towards Gembrook).

Clematis station in July 2023

Clematis' single side platform has a surface primarily of dirt with varying levels of grass growth; under the station building's verandah and in narrow strips along the platform edge, the surface includes gravel. A strip of timber separates the platform from the track. The duplex station building includes a small wooden portable (left) and a larger corrugated iron structure (right), both painted in a light buff with dark brown highlights; the larger structure has a small corrugated iron verandah projecting over the platform, while the smaller building bears the station's sign and a larger door. Clematis station's primary access route is a gravel path down the hill from the car park of the Paradise Valley Hotel, making it notably inaccessible. Slightly down-line from the station, the single track briefly splits to create a siding.

== History ==
The Gembrook line opened on 18 December 1900 without a station at Clematis. Within months, locals were advocating for a stopping place in the area, with such discussions referenced in a Fern Tree Gully Shire Council meeting on 1 February, 1901. On 10 March 1902, the station opened as an unnamed stopping place beside what was then Michael O'Connor's 'Eden House', the 1882 institution that would later become Paradise Valley Hotel. In May of that year, Victorian Railways asked the council to name the stop. 'Lambie' and 'Paradise Gully' were suggested, but the council chose 'Paradise Valley'. A journalist in 1903 observed that "stations on the line are only so by courtesy"; there were no facilities except an earthen platform.

Paradise (now Clematis) Station as passengers board c. 1900s - the station at this time consisted of an earthen platform

In 1907, Eden House acquired a full hotel license and became the Paradise Hotel, matching the station. The next year, the station's name was shortened to 'Paradise'. In 1909, Victorian Railways agreed to install the goods siding after local pressure and fundraising dating at least to the previous April. This addition was followed by further improvements to the station in 1910. By this time, the area's prosperity as a tourist resort was growing with a 1908 report recording "quite a number of neat villas" appearing as country residences for "leading Melbourne gentlemen." By the 1910s, the station was a significant point for loading gooseberries from the local Tivoli farm onto trains for processing by the Australasian Jam Company. At peak production, fifty to sixty tons of gooseberries were harvested annually. Like most of the line, Paradise received many tourists from the city; in 1919, the station recorded 1353 outward-travelling visitors, though these figures declined by the end of the 1920s.

In 1921, the station was again renamed to Clematis to match the name of the local post office. The name 'Paradise' had caused confusion in mail deliveries, with deliveries frequently mistakenly routed to the town of Paradise in Northern Victoria. Several commentators responded to the change with humour, including The Mountaineer's article on the subject and Councilor Kerr lamenting "Paradise lost" in reference to the poem by John Milton. In the 1930s, Clematis was at threat of demolition; several proposals were made through that decade to close the Gembrook line following a decline in ridership through the Great Depression. A notable incident occurred in 1935, when on July 9 it was reported that railway workers had begun to demolish the station. This action was aborted following public outcry that Parliament was yet to decide the fate of the line, with a 1930s closure in the end entirely averted.

Clematis Station, Victoria c. 1936 as a train arrives

Photographs show that the extant station building at Clematis was present by 1936. Rather than the original earthen platform, the station now included a gravel platform, on which stood a corrugated iron waiting shed with a verandah, alongside the wooden office or storage room and a metal water tank.

By the 1950s, the Gembrook line was causing continuous and growing financial losses, and had been unable to increase profits from post-war tourism. In 1953, a major landslide occurred between the Selby and Menzies Creek stations, finally bringing about the line's closure in April 1954. After significant work by the Puffing Billy Preservation Society, trains past Clematis resumed on 31 July 1965 under the Puffing Billy Railway with Rohan Delacombe, the Governor of Victoria, officially declaring the line open to Emerald. Work to repair Clematis station occurred in the years prior to the line's reopening, with one photograph capturing repairs on the at-that-time dilapidated station. Clematis station itself was not reopened until 25 October 1966 after works to further improve its siding.

Clematis station November 1972 - a standalone sign is still present on the platform

In October 1977, Selby station—with the rest of the line—was transferred to the ownership of the Emerald Tourist Railway Board, which in 2022 became the Puffing Billy Railway Board. Photographs from 1972 suggest that Clematis' standalone station sign was removed from the platform since then.

== Platforms and services ==
Clematis station has one side platform. It is served by the Puffing Billy Railway, a heritage railway running steam locomotives as a tourist service. In ordinary circumstances, Puffing Billy tickets passing Clematis can only be purchased as return journeys departing from and returning to Belgrave. As a tourist line, tickets are significantly more expensive than commuter public transit, and must be purchased in advance. The train does not typically stop at Clematis, although this occasionally occurs in special circumstances and may be arrangeable.

== Transport links ==
The Puffing Billy Station/Belgrave-Gembrook Rd bus stop a short walk from Clematis station is serviced by one route operated by Ventura Bus Lines, under contract to Public Transport Victoria:

- 695 : Belgrave – Gembrook
