= Monbulk =

- Town
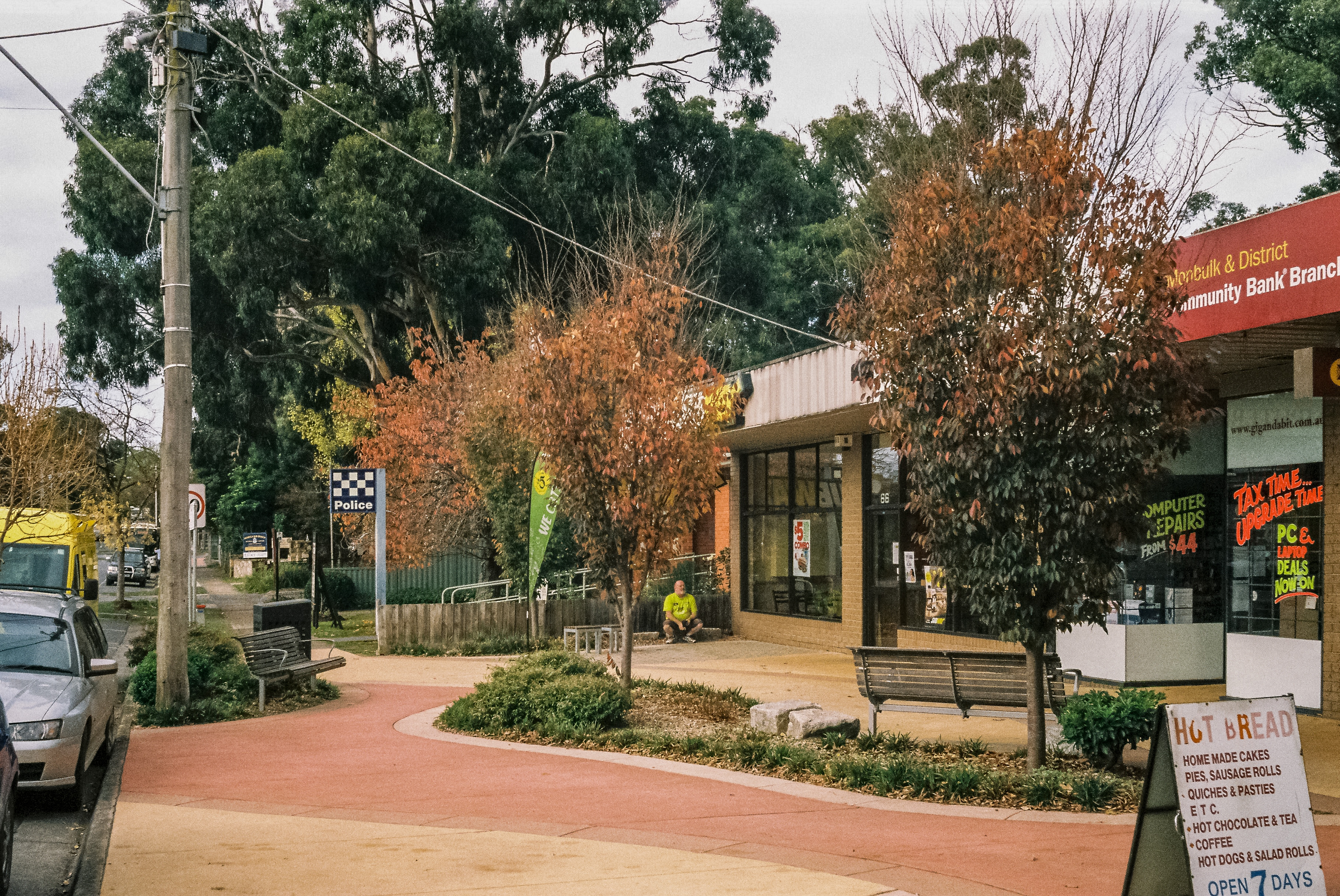
- Monbulk, Victoria

- Interactive map of Monbulk
- Coordinates: 37.878°S 145.411°E
- Country: Australia
- State: Victoria
- City: Melbourne
- LGA: Shire of Yarra Ranges
- Location: 42 km (26 mi) from Melbourne; 7 km (4.3 mi) from Belgrave

Government
  - State electorate: Monbulk
  - Federal division: Casey
- Elevation: 265 m (869 ft)

Population
  - Total: 3,651 (2021 census)
- Postcode: 3793
Localities around Monbulk
Olinda	Silvan	Macclesfield
Olinda	Monbulk	Macclesfield
Kallista	The Patch	Emerald

Monbulk is a town in Victoria, Australia, 42 km east of Melbourne's Central Business District, located within the Shire of Yarra Ranges local government area. Monbulk recorded a population of 3,651 at the 2021 census.

The town is the home of the Monbulk Rangers Soccer Club, Monbulk Cricket Club and Monbulk Football and Netball Club.

== History ==
The town's name is believed to have been derived from the Wurundjeri word Monbolok or Monbolac, which means "hiding place in the hills" or "sanctuary in the hills". Early in the initial period of European colonisation, Europeans referred to the area as the Dandenong Forest Village Settlement. A town was established in 1893, and comprised 76 farms across 10-acres or 40,000m2. When the Parish of Monbulk was established, the town's name was changed to what it is today. The town’s abundance of rich fertile soils led to the foundation of a number farms and orchards, growing fruits and vegetables, as well as cut flowers. A number of businesses took advantage of the rich soils, and focused their production on jams and preserves, such as the Monbulk Jam Factory, established in 1897.

The town's first school, Monbulk Primary School, was established in 1897, and by 1906 three churches had been built in the town. The town has been affected by bushfires throughout its history, with the Monbulk Primary School razed by fire in 1913. The town was again affected by bushfires in 1944. Monbulk continued to grow throughout the later half of the 20th century, growing from a post-war population of 781 in 1947, to 3,577 people at the most recent census. The town continues to be a centre of agricultural activity, with the nursery production and floriculture production industries both representing the two most common industries of employment for residents of Monbulk as of 2016. In the 1950s, Ivan Southall, built a house at Blackwood Farm, on Old Emerald Road, Monbulk. His children's novels Ash Road and Hills End were written there and set in the area.

== Economy ==
Monbulk is one of the many towns of the Yarra Ranges that is known for its agricultural production. Most notably, the town's two largest sources of employment are in nursery production and floriculture production. Monbulk is also the location of the headquarters and growing facilities for Australia's largest online nursery and mail order garden supplier, Garden Express. The state's oldest wholesale flower company in continual operation, Tesselaar Flowers, is also located in Monbulk.

== Geography ==
Monbulk is located 42 kilometres east of Melbourne, 7 kilometres north-east of Belgrave and 7 kilometres south-east of Mount Dandenong. Monbulk shares a border with Silvan to the north, Macclesfield to the east, Olinda to the west, and The Patch and Kallista to the south. The soils found in Monbulk are highly regarded for their drainage ability and low erodibility.

=== Climate ===
Monbulk experiences a warm summer Temperate climate (Köppen climate classification Cfb) and receives an average rainfall higher than that of nearby Melbourne.

Climate data for Monbulk, Victoria
Month	Jan	Feb	Mar	Apr	May	Jun	Jul	Aug	Sep	Oct	Nov	Dec	Year
Mean daily maximum °C (°F)	26.3 (79.3)	26.8 (80.2)	24.3 (75.7)	20.2 (68.4)	16.5 (61.7)	13.7 (56.7)	13.1 (55.6)	14.4 (57.9)	16.6 (61.9)	19.3 (66.7)	21.7 (71.1)	24.2 (75.6)	19.8 (67.6)
Mean daily minimum °C (°F)	13.6 (56.5)	14.1 (57.4)	12.7 (54.9)	10.2 (50.4)	8.4 (47.1)	6.5 (43.7)	6.0 (42.8)	6.5 (43.7)	7.8 (46.0)	8.9 (48.0)	10.6 (51.1)	12.1 (53.8)	9.8 (49.6)
Average precipitation mm (inches)	52.4 (2.06)	53.5 (2.11)	52.8 (2.08)	67.4 (2.65)	87.4 (3.44)	70.3 (2.77)	73.2 (2.88)	79.8 (3.14)	84.4 (3.32)	84.5 (3.33)	81.0 (3.19)	73.5 (2.89)	860.2 (33.86)

== Monbulk Jam ==
Established in 1897, the Monbulk Co-operative Fruitgrowers' Association was one of the most successful fruits and preserves company in the area, with the jams produced by the company becoming a common household item through much of the 20th century. Co-founded by Daniel Camm, the co-operative constructed their own pulping and tinning facilities, to overcome issues with transporting raw product over the ranges and into Melbourne. The jams produced by the company were used during World War Two, after the company secured a contract to supply the armed forces of both Australia and Britain.

By the 1970s, the company was producing more than 5 million kilograms of jam per year, at which point the ownership of the company exchanged hands, eventually transferring to the Shepparton Fruit Preserving Company. The factory in Monbulk was eventually closed in 1991.

== See also ==
- Electoral district of Monbulk
