= Division of Streeton =

Former Australian federal electoral division

Streeton Australian House of Representatives Division
- Created: 1984
- Abolished: 1990
- Namesake: Sir Arthur Streeton

The Division of Streeton was an Australian Electoral Division in the state of Victoria. It was named after the painter Sir Arthur Streeton.

The Division was proclaimed at the redistribution of 14 September 1984, and was first contested at the 1984 federal election. It was abolished at the redistribution of 5 June 1989, taking effect at the 1990 election.

The division was located on the eastern outskirts of Melbourne, the Yarra Valley and the Dandenong Ranges. It covered the suburbs of Croydon, Kilsyth, Mount Evelyn and the towns of Gembrook, Emerald, Seville, Yarra Junction, Warburton, Marysville and Healesville. However, the division stopped short of the south-eastern suburb of Pakenham and the Gippsland town of Bunyip. The areas within Streeton were previously parts of Division of Casey, Division of McMillan and Division of La Trobe. When Streeton was abolished in 1989, the areas were transferred back to primarily the divisions of Casey (Yarra Valley) and La Trobe (Dandenong Ranges). The division did not undergo any boundary changes during its six years of existence.

== Members ==
Image	Member	Party	Term	Notes
	Tony Lamb (1939–)	Labor	1 December 1984 – 24 March 1990	Previously held the Division of La Trobe. Failed to win the Division of Deakin when Streeton was abolished in 1990
