= Cardinia Creek =

Stream in Victoria, Australia

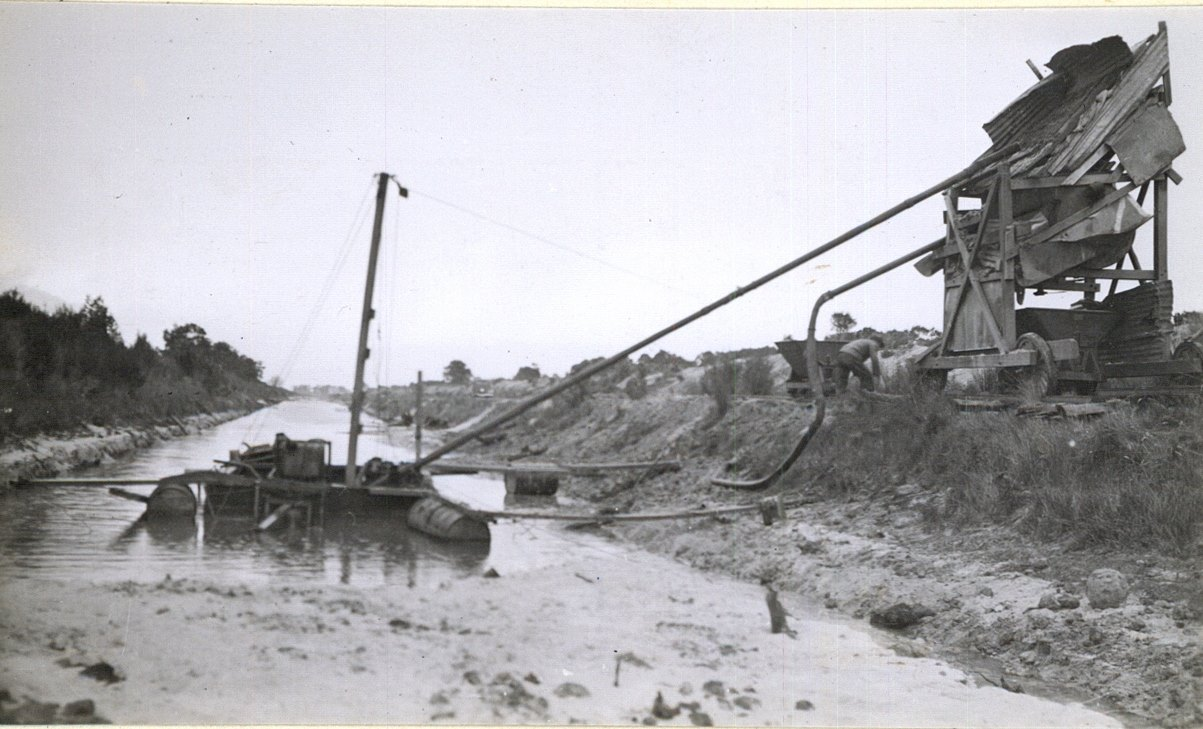
- Dredging on the creek, looking downstream, 1940

- Location of the river mouth in Victoria

Location
- Country: Australia
- State: Victoria
- Region: Greater Melbourne
- Local government areas: Cardinia Shire; City of Casey

Physical characteristics
- Source: Dandenong Ranges
  - location: Cardinia Reservoir
  - coordinates: 37°57′26″S 145°23′12″E
- Mouth: Western Port Bay
  - coordinates: 38°13′01″S 145°26′06″E

Basin features
- River system: Western Port catchment
- Waterbodies: Cardinia Reservoir

The Cardinia Creek is a freshwater stream southeast of Melbourne, Victoria, Australia, that flows from the Cardinia Reservoir in the Dandenong Ranges into the Western Port Bay between Tooradin and Koo Wee Rup. The creek forms majority of the boundary between the local government areas of the City of Casey and the Shire of Cardinia. The creek flows generally south-south-east, through the town of Beaconsfield.

Native flora and fauna, including platypus, can be found in the creek. Invasive species, including deer, are also found in the reserves adjacent to the creek.

Various reserves are located adjacent to the creek, and, during 2022, the Victorian Government proposed the creation of the 600-hectare (1,500-acre) Cardinia Creek Regional Parklands.
