= Bob Charles (politician) =

Australian politician

Member of the Australian Parliament for La Trobe
- In office 24 March 1990 – 31 August 2004
- Preceded by: Peter Milton
- Succeeded by: Jason Wood

Personal details
- Born: Robert Edwin Charles; 24 July 1936 Covington, Kentucky, U.S.
- Died: 17 April 2016 (aged 79) Melbourne, Victoria, Australia
- Party: Liberal Party of Australia
- Occupation: Engineer

Robert Edwin Charles (24 July 1936 – 17 April 2016) was an American-born Australian politician. He was a Liberal member of the Australian House of Representatives from March 1990 to October 2004, representing the Division of La Trobe, Victoria.

Charles was born in Covington, Kentucky and educated at Purdue University BSc (MechEng). He was an engineer before entering politics. He was a foreman, supervisor, International Marketing Manager and Managing Director of an instrument company and Chairman and Managing Director of a construction company. He moved to Australia in 1969, became a citizen of Australia in 1974, and was first elected to the La Trobe seat in 1990.

Charles was a member of the Opposition Shadow Ministry 1994–96. He retired at the 2004 election. In 2005, Charles was appointed as the Australian Consul-General in Chicago.

Charles died on 17 April 2016, aged 79.

Parliament of Australia
Preceded by Peter Milton	Member for La Trobe; 1990–2004	Succeeded by Jason Wood
Diplomatic posts
Preceded by Ron Harvey	Australian Consul-General in Chicago; 2005–2008	Succeeded by Elizabeth Schick
