= John Jess =

Australian politician

John Jess CBE
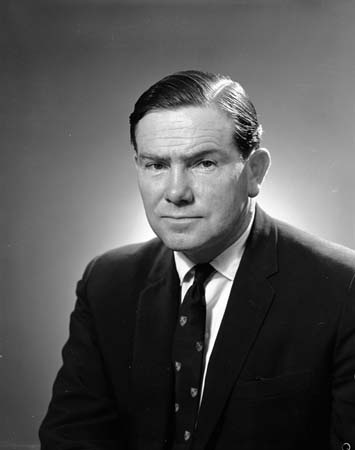

Member of the Australian Parliament for La Trobe
- In office 9 April 1960 – 2 December 1972
- Preceded by: Richard Casey
- Succeeded by: Tony Lamb

Personal details
- Born: John David Jess; 15 April 1922 Melbourne, Victoria
- Died: 18 October 2003 (aged 81) Geelong, Victoria
- Party: Liberal Party of Australia
- Spouse: Helen Joy Smart
- Children: David Carl, James Carl, Elizabeth Evelyn
- Occupation: Parliamentarian

John David Jess, CBE (15 April 1922 – 18 October 2003) was an Australian politician.

Born in Melbourne, he was the son of Sir Carl Jess and Marjory Mary Jess (née McGibbon). Educated at Melbourne Grammar School, he was a lieutenant in the Citizens Military Force during the Second World War, serving in Melbourne and Queensland, before becoming an estate agent. He was elected to the Australian House of Representatives in a 1960 by-election for the seat of La Trobe, representing the Liberal Party. He held the seat until his defeat in 1972. He was instrumental in bringing about the second Royal Commission into the Melbourne–Voyager ship collision in 1964. He was known throughout his 12-year career in politics as the "Seeker of Justice" for his efforts in fighting for issues of justice. Jess died in 2003.

Parliament of Australia
Preceded by Richard Casey	Member for La Trobe; 1960–1972	Succeeded by Tony Lamb
