= Marshall Baillieu =

Australian politician (born 1937)

Member of the Australian Parliament for La Trobe
- In office 13 December 1975 – 18 October 1980
- Preceded by: Tony Lamb
- Succeeded by: Peter Milton

Personal details
- Born: 6 June 1937 (age 89) Melbourne, Victoria, Australia
- Party: Liberal
- Occupation: Investment manager

Ian Marshall Baillieu (born 6 June 1937) is a former Australian politician. He is a prominent member of the wealthy Baillieu family of Melbourne and until 2013 chaired the family investment company. He served in the House of Representatives from 1975 to 1980, representing the Victorian seat of La Trobe for the Liberal Party.

== Early life ==
Baillieu was born in Melbourne on 6 June 1937, the son of Nancy Elizabeth "Betty" (née Willsallen) and Marshal Lawrence "Bill" Baillieu. His father was the nephew of entrepreneur William Lawrence Baillieu. An article in The Canberra Times prior to his election to parliament described him as "a Beaconsfield market gardener and agricultural engineer".

== Politics ==
Baillieu was elected to parliament at the 1975 federal election, winning the Division of La Trobe from the incumbent Australian Labor Party (ALP) member Tony Lamb. He was re-elected in 1977 but was defeated by the Labor candidate Peter Milton at the 1980 election. Prior to the vote he had been given the highest rating by the Victorian Right To Life Association and Milton had been given the lowest. It was later reported that Prime Minister Malcolm Fraser had pork barreled La Trobe in an attempt to secure Baillieu's re-election, granting a local textile manufacturer relief from tariff reforms.

== Other activities ==
Baillieu served as the chairman of Mutual Trust, a company established in 1951 to manage his family's wealth. He retired in 2013 and was granted the title of "chairman emeritus". The family's wealth was estimated at $568 million in the 2014 Financial Review Rich List.

As of 2016, Baillieu lived on Minta Farm, a farming property of 286 hectares (710 acres) in Berwick, Victoria, which has been in the family since 1920. He sold 114 hectares (280 acres) to developer Stockland in December 2016 for a sum reportedly between $150–200 million. The remaining northern portion of the farm was retained by the family.

== Personal life ==
Baillieu is a second cousin of former Victorian premier Ted Baillieu. In 2012, during his cousin's premiership, he issued a statement apologising for giving the finger to a group of nurses protesting government policies outside a book launch at the Baillieu Library.

Baillieu is a member of the Melbourne Club. He reportedly campaigned for the club presidency in 2012 but subsequently withdrew.

Parliament of Australia
Preceded by Tony Lamb	Member for La Trobe; 1975–1980	Succeeded by Peter Milton
