= Jason Wood (politician) =

Australian politician

The Honourable Jason Wood MP
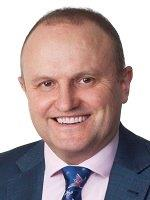
- Wood c. 2019

Assistant Minister for Customs, Community Safety and Multicultural Affairs
- In office 29 May 2019 – 23 May 2022
- Prime Minister: Scott Morrison
- Preceded by: New title
- Succeeded by: Office abolished

Member of the Australian Parliament for La Trobe
- Incumbent
- Assumed office 7 September 2013
- Preceded by: Laura Smyth
- In office 9 October 2004 – 21 August 2010
- Preceded by: Bob Charles
- Succeeded by: Laura Smyth

Personal details
- Born: Jason Peter Wood; 24 May 1968 (age 58) Sutherland, New South Wales, Australia
- Party: Liberal
- Spouse: Judy Cheung
- Profession: Police officer
- Website: jasonwood.com.au

Jason Peter Wood (born 24 May 1968) is an Australian politician and former police officer. He is a member of the Liberal Party and has been a member of the House of Representatives since 2013, representing the seat of La Trobe. He previously held the seat from 2004 to 2010. He was an assistant minister in the Morrison government from 2019 to 2022.

== Early life ==
Wood was born on 24 May 1968 in Sutherland, New South Wales. He grew up in Ferny Creek, Victoria, attending Ferny Creek Primary School and Ferntree Gully Technical School. His final year of secondary education was completed at Boronia Secondary College. He specialised in outdoor education and briefly worked as a school camp coordinator.

Wood joined the Victoria Police in 1988 and from 1990 was a detective in the organised crime squad. He completed a graduate diploma in innovative service management and a Master of Applied Science at RMIT University. He was involved in investigating gangland figure Alphonse Gangitano. In 2003 Wood became a senior sergeant in the counter-terrorism coordination unit. The Age reported in 2004 that he was "believed to be youngest senior sergeant in the force and has received various commendations".

== Political career ==
Wood joined the Liberal Party in 2000. He stood unsuccessfully in the Division of Holt for the Liberal Party at the 2001 federal election. From 2002 to 2003 he was the vice-president of the party's Boronia/Dandenong Ranges branch.

Wood was elected to the House of Representatives at the 2004 federal election, retaining the Division of La Trobe for the Liberals following the retirement of Bob Charles. From December 2004 he served on the House of Representatives Standing Committee on Environment and Heritage as well as the Joint Statutory Committee for the Australian Crime Commission.

Wood was a shadow parliamentary secretary under opposition leaders Malcolm Turnbull and Tony Abbott from 2008 to 2010. He was defeated by Australian Labor Party candidate Laura Smyth at the 2010 election, but regained La Trobe at the 2013 election.

In 2013, he was appointed chair of the Joint Standing Committee on Migration. During the 2016–2019 parliamentary term, Wood campaigned on law and order issues, particularly in relation to "African gangs", which made up one percent of reported crimes at the time. He later said he had "no regrets" about the campaign and rejected claims that the Liberals campaign had racist undertones.

After winning re-election in 2019, Wood was appointed as Assistant Minister for Customs, Community Safety and Multicultural Affairs in the Morrison government. He held this position until that government’s defeat in May 2022.

In 2022, Wood was included in new opposition leader Peter Dutton's shadow ministry with responsibility for the portfolio of community safety, migrant services and multicultural affairs.

== Political views ==
In 2023, Wood was identified by the Sydney Morning Herald as a member of the Centrist faction of the Liberal Party, after previously being aligned with the centre-right faction during the Morrison government years.

In a speech he made in parliament in 2009, Wood said he had often campaigned on environmental issues, had formerly supported an emissions trading scheme, and had been a member of Greenpeace for longer than he had been a member of the Liberal Party.

In 2023, Wood campaigned for the "No" vote in the 2023 Australian Indigenous Voice referendum.

== Personal life ==
As of 2022, Wood lived with his family in Mount Dandenong, outside his electorate.

Parliament of Australia
Preceded by Bob Charles	Member for La Trobe; 2004–2010	Succeeded by Laura Smyth
Preceded by Laura Smyth	Member for La Trobe; 2013–present	Incumbent
