= Peter Milton (politician) =

Australian politician

Member of the Australian Parliament for La Trobe
- In office 18 October 1980 – 24 March 1990
- Preceded by: Marshall Baillieu
- Succeeded by: Bob Charles

Personal details
- Born: 22 September 1928 London, England
- Died: 8 August 2009 (aged 80) Northcote, Victoria, Australia
- Party: Australian Labor Party
- Education: University of Melbourne
- Occupation: Registrar

Peter Milton (22 September 1928 – 8 August 2009) was an Australian politician. Born in London, England, he was educated at the University of Melbourne and served in the military from 1946 to 1949. On his return, he was assistant registrar at the University of Melbourne. In 1980, he was elected to the Australian House of Representatives as the Labor member for La Trobe. He held the seat until his defeat in 1990. He died of cancer on 8 August 2009 at his home in Northcote.

Parliament of Australia
Preceded by Marshall Baillieu	Member for La Trobe; 1980–1990	Succeeded by Bob Charles
