= The Patch, Victoria =

The Patch Melbourne, Victoria
- Coordinates: 37.894°S 145.393°E
- Population: 1,046 (2021 census)
- Postcode(s): 3792
- Elevation: 301 m (988 ft)
- Location: 39 km (24 mi) from Melbourne; 7 km (4 mi) from Belgrave
- LGA(s): Shire of Yarra Ranges
- State electorate(s): Monbulk
- Federal division(s): Casey
Suburbs around The Patch:
Olinda	Monbulk	Monbulk
Kallista	The Patch	Monbulk
Selby	Menzies Creek	Kallista

The Patch is a suburb in Melbourne, Victoria, Australia, 39 km east from Melbourne's central business district, located within the Shire of Yarra Ranges local government area. The Patch recorded a population of 1,046 at the 2021 census.

== History ==
In the 1860s, a patch of mountain ash trees were prevalent in just one area and so that area was named The Patch—as recounted in Helen Coulson's book Story of the Dandenongs. A part of Monbulk not far from Kallista has come under the locality now considered to be The Patch.

There was a brief gold-rush in the area in 1858. During the depression of the 1890s, under the Settlement on Lands Act (1893) in response to poverty, inspired by the idealism of the Rev. Horace Finn Tucker, land around The Patch was divided into 10-acre farming selections and for unemployed city people, most of whom lived in earth-floored paling shacks with of calico instead of glass for windows and who cooked with stream water over camp fires. Many of the people sent had little knowledge of farming or the bush and were doomed to failure. However berry growing was established successfully in the area by the late 1890s, though it was made difficult by poor transport through the hills to metropolitan markets. A successful grower Daniel Camm established Monbulk Jams, with sales worldwide.

The Post Office opened on 1 September 1908. A Post Office also opened at Fairy Dell on 1 July 1916 and closed in 1971.

The Anglican church was built in 1934, the community hall in the 1950s and the primary school in 1983–4. The hall is near the post office (which is also the general store) and the school. The Patch contains area previously known as Coonan and Fairy Dell. Its census population in 1933 was 88 and in 1947 it was 195. It remains a small township and scenic area.

== The town today ==
The Patch is a very small suburb and consists only of houses, a community hall, a general store, a primary school, several commercial nurseries and a tennis court. Most of the suburb is classified "Rural Residential".
