= Laura Smyth (politician) =

Australian politician

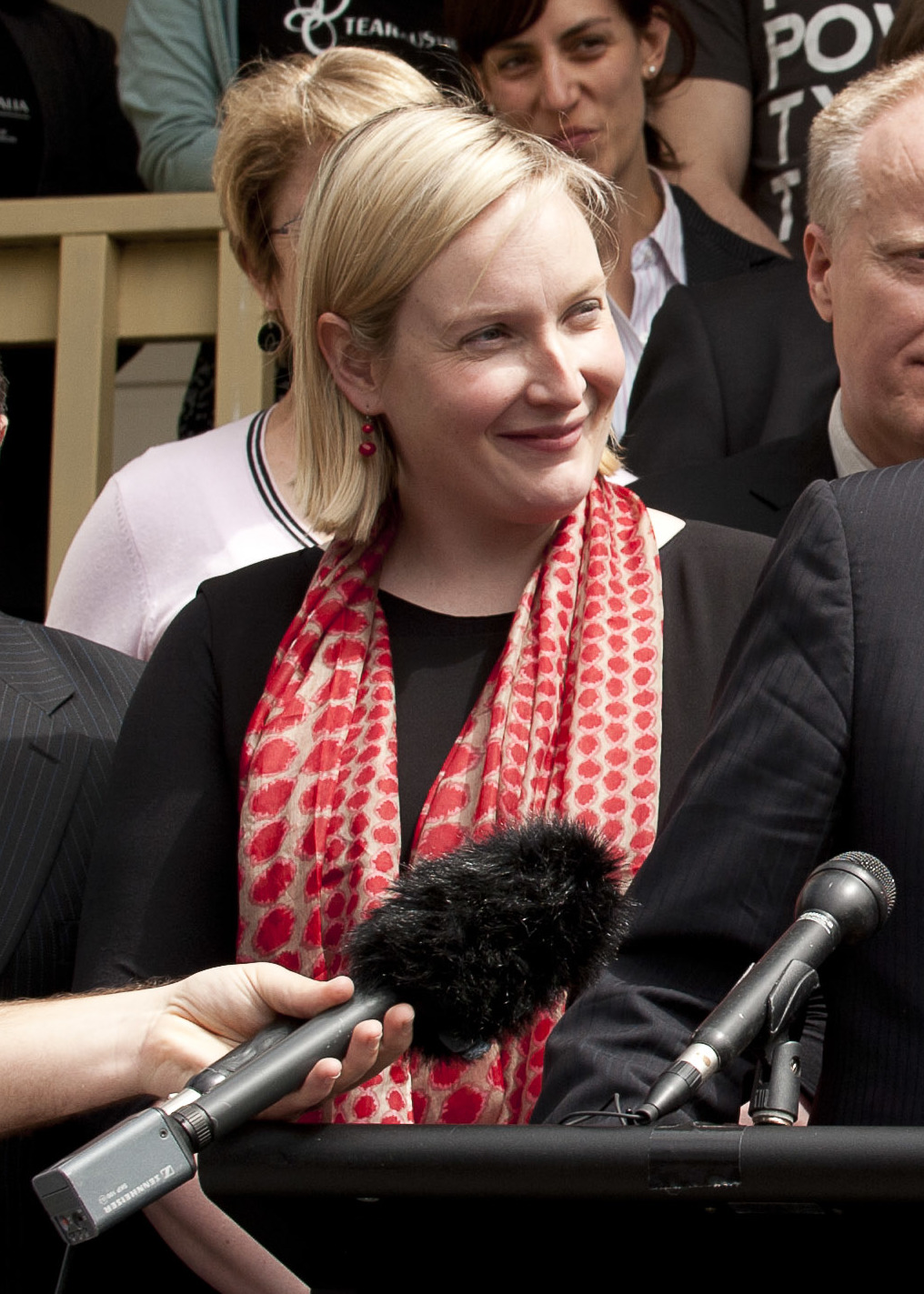

Member of the Australian Parliament for La Trobe
- In office 21 August 2010 – 7 September 2013
- Preceded by: Jason Wood
- Succeeded by: Jason Wood

Personal details
- Born: Laura Mary Smyth; 12 November 1976 (age 49) Belfast, Northern Ireland
- Party: Australian Labor Party
- Education: Monash University; University of Melbourne
- Occupation: Lawyer
- Website: http://www.laurasmyth.net

Laura Mary Smyth (born 12 November 1976) is a former Australian politician who served as a member of the Australian House of Representatives for the seat of La Trobe representing the Australian Labor Party. She defeated Liberal MP Jason Wood at the 2010 federal election. She was defeated by Wood at the 2013 election.

== Early years and background ==
Smyth was educated at St Lukes Primary School, Twinbrook, Belfast, County Antrim, Dandenong and Oakleigh before attending Monash University, where she completed a Bachelor of Science (Honours) and a Bachelor of Laws. She worked as a corporate lawyer for almost ten years, and studied at the University of Melbourne for a Master's in law (LLM).

Parliament of Australia
Preceded by Jason Wood	Member for La Trobe; 2010–2013	Succeeded by Jason Wood
