= 1960 La Trobe by-election =

A by-election was held for the Australian House of Representatives seat of La Trobe on 9 April 1960. This was triggered by the resignation of Liberal MP Richard Casey to take up a life peerage in the British House of Lords. A by-election for the seat of Hunter was held on the same day.

The by-election was won by Liberal candidate John Jess.

== Results ==
La Trobe by-election, 1960
Party	Candidate	Votes	%	±%
Labor	Don Pritchard	23,387	43.7	+6.8
Liberal	John Jess	22,880	42.8	−10.9
Democratic Labor	John Martyr	6,834	12.8	+3.5
Republican	John Murray	406	0.8	+0.8
Total formal votes		53,507	98.4	
Informal votes		872	1.6	
Turnout		54,379	91.2	
Two-party-preferred result
Liberal	John Jess	28,999	54.2	−6.9
Labor	Don Pritchard	24,508	45.8	+6.9
Liberal hold		Swing	−6.9	
