= Kallista =

- Town
- Interactive map of Kallista
- Coordinates: 37.883°S 145.372°E
- Country: Australia
- State: Victoria
- City: Melbourne
- LGA: Shire of Yarra Ranges
- Location: 36 km (22 mi) from Melbourne; 6 km (3.7 mi) from Belgrave

Government
  - State electorate: Monbulk
  - Federal division: Casey

Area
  - Total: 12.2 km^{2} (4.7 sq mi)

Population
  - Total: 1,418 (2021 census)
  - Density: 116.2/km^{2} (301.0/sq mi)
- Postcode: 3791
Localities around Kallista
| Sherbrooke | Olinda | Monbulk |
| Dandenong Ranges | Kallista | The Patch |
| Belgrave | Selby | Menzies Creek |

Kallista is a locality within Greater Melbourne beyond the Melbourne metropolitan area Urban Growth Boundary, 36 kilometres (22 mi) south-east from the Melbourne central business district, located within the Shire of Yarra Ranges local government area. Kallista recorded a population of 6700 at the 1908 census.

The town is closely associated with the work of Thomas William Roberts, a British-born Australian artist and leading member of the Heidelberg School art movement, also known as Australian impressionism, who lived and worked in Kallista between 1893 and 1931.

== History ==
Kallista's history has moved from likely use by Aboriginals prior to white settlement, to slow development by loggers and farmers, through settler selection to the current mix of state forest (Sherbrooke Forest, part of the Dandenong Ranges National Park), residential housing and agriculture. Kallista's history is closely related to the suburbs around Kallista, including Sherbrooke, Sassafras, Olinda, The Patch, Monbulk and Belgrave. From being a distant holiday town from Melbourne in the early-to-mid-part of the twentieth century, Kallista is now part of greater metropolitan Melbourne.

The earliest white settlers were loggers in the 1850s. Gradually other settlers arrived. In 1867, the State Government commissioned a survey of the area around what is now Kallista. Twenty-six thousand five hundred acres (10,700 hectares) were declared a forest reserve, although in 1878 the boundaries were altered and another 10,000 acres (4,000 hectares) were made available for sale.

During the economic depression of the 1890s in Victoria, the President of the Board of Land and Works and Commissioner Crown Lands and Survey, John McIntyre, decided to open areas of the Dandenong Ranges for selection. Although there were protests from various groups, another 10,000 acres (4,000 hectares) were opened in 1893.

Selectors were of two types: village selectors and free selectors. Village selectors were expected to live on their selections and could work on the roads. Free selectors were unable to work on the roads, but could keep their existing jobs and work the land. South Sassafras (Kallista) was open to free selectors.

The Post Office opened around 1902 and was known as South Sassafras until 1925.

From 1912 to 1918 roads were completed between Belgrave and South Sassafras (Kallista) and Monbulk. Melburnians then began to use the area for weekenders and holiday homes as the original 10-acre (4-hectare) farm blocks were subdivided. The South Sassafras State School opened on 10 March 1919 with sixteen pupils. It was first located in the local hall known as the Mechanics Hall and by 1924 had moved to its current location on Monbulk Road. A telephone exchange was installed in 1923.

By 1924, the problem of confusion of the name of South Sassafras with Sassafras led to suggestions that the name of the town be changed. Many names were suggested, but the name "Kallista" (in ancient Greek, "Kalliste", meaning "most beautiful") was adopted and the change made on 1 April 1925.

The Great Depression saw an influx of people buying the weekend cottages from Melburnians who could not afford to keep them up. The new owners were hoping to support their families from the blocks of land.

=== Early settlers ===
John Hardy (after whom Hardy's Creek was named) was commissioned by the State Government to survey the area around what is now Kallista in 1867. Early settlers included James Hermon (Hermon's Saddle Reserve and Hermon's Corner (the corner of Grantulla Road and the Belgrave-Gembrook Road)) and Matthew Hall (remembered in Hall's Track, the original name of Grantulla Road and now the name of the track in Sherbrooke Forest that runs along Grantulla Road). Matthew Hall sold land to G.W. Selby (after whom the neighbouring suburb of Selby is named). One of Selby's managers was William Grant, who built Grantulla. J. Jackson (Jackson's Hill) selected the land adjoining Selby's.

J.C. Cole, a nurseryman, started a nursery called "Glen Harrow" (Glen Harrow Heights Road) between Belgrave and Kallista. Coles Ridge Road was named after him.

In 1910 Mr John Garibaldi "Garry" Roberts and his family acquired an allotment on the north side of Sassafras Creek (now Sunnyside Avenue) opposite Beagley's Bridge (now part of Perrins Creek Road). The property was named "Sunnyside" and became a focal point for many artistic guests, including C. J. Dennis and Jeannie Gunn, author of "We of the Never Never". Mr Roberts acquired a number of buses (retired horse-drawn omnibuses) which were brought to Sunnyside to provide accommodation for the visitors.

CJ Dennis wrote "The Songs of a Sentimental Bloke" whilst staying at Sunnyside. It was illustrated by Hal Gye who was also a visitor to Sunnyside. First published on 9 October 1915, it was dedicated to Mr and Mrs JG Roberts.

The foundations of the original "Sunnyside" still remain after a house fire in 1937.

== Today ==
Kallista Village is particularly known for its proximity to Sherbrooke Forest. Walks around Sherbrooke Forest range from easy to somewhat steep. Sherbrooke is well known for its superb lyrebird population, which has increased recently with efforts to reduce the feral cat and fox population. Although early in the morning is the best time to see and hear lyrebirds, they can be seen and heard throughout the day. The males' calls are particularly prominent in June.

Grants Picnic Ground, on Monbulk Road near Kallista Village, is very popular with tourists, as large numbers of sulphur-crested cockatoos, crimson rosellas, galahs and Australian king parrots gather to be fed bird seed by on-lookers. They will usually fly down and sit on hands, arms and (sometimes) heads.

== Notable residents ==
- Don Chipp, founder of the Australian Democrats, lived in Kallista for many years during the 1980s.
- Tom Roberts, painter, lived here between 1856 and 1931. A painting of his entitled "Washing Day, Kallista" is hanging in the Art Gallery of New South Wales. A local road is named after him.
- C. J. Dennis, poet and author, wrote much of his The Songs of a Sentimental Bloke on J. G. Roberts' property at Sunnyside circa 1913/14.
