= Tony Lamb =

Australian politician

Dr Tony Lamb OAM
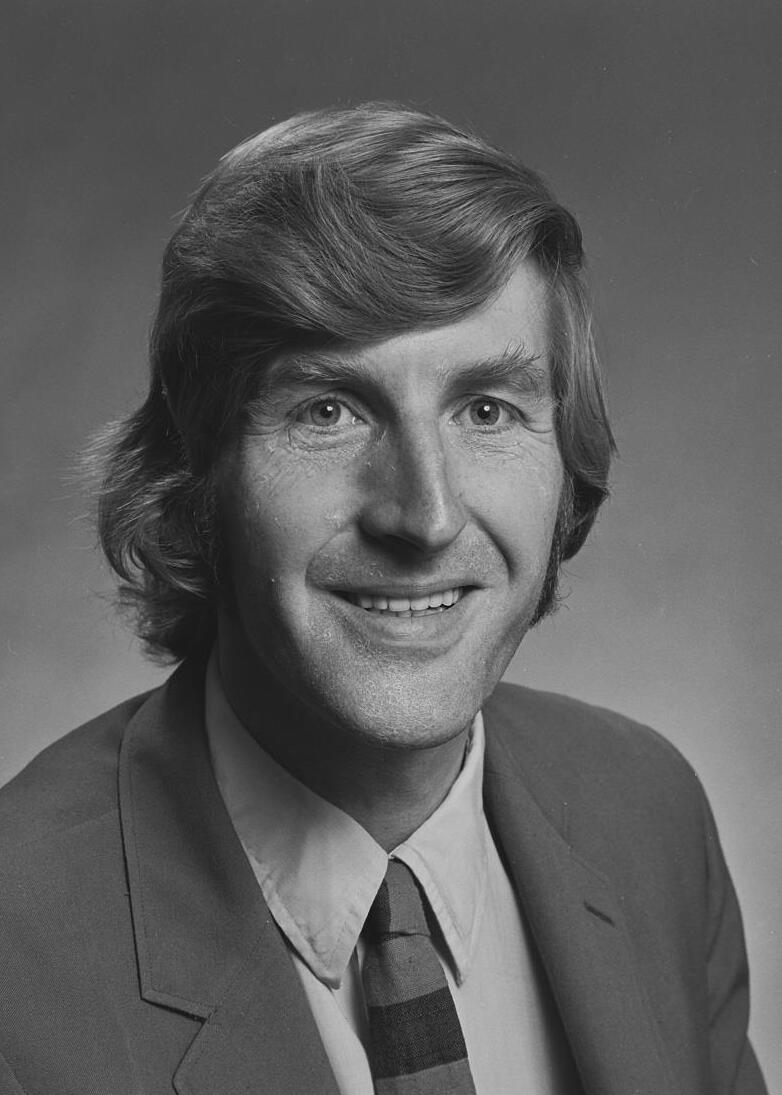
- Lamb in 1973

Member of the Australian Parliament for Streeton
- In office 1 December 1984 – 24 March 1990
- Preceded by: New seat
- Succeeded by: Division abolished

Member of the Australian Parliament for La Trobe
- In office 2 December 1972 – 13 December 1975
- Preceded by: John Jess
- Succeeded by: Marshall Baillieu

Personal details
- Born: Antony Hamilton Lamb; 7 March 1939 (age 87) Horsham, Victoria
- Party: Australian Labor Party
- Relations: Hamilton Lamb (father)
- Education: University of Melbourne; Victorian College of Pharmacy
- Occupation: Pharmacist

Antony Hamilton Lamb OAM (born 7 March 1939) is a former Australian politician. He served in the House of Representatives from 1972 to 1975 and from 1984 to 1990, representing the Australian Labor Party (ALP). He was a pharmacist prior to entering politics.

== Early life ==
Lamb was born on 7 March 1939 in Horsham, Victoria. He was one of three children born to Marie Christine (née Schultz) and George Hamilton Lamb, his father being a Country Party member of the parliament of Victoria. His mother died in 1941 following a long illness, while his father died in 1943 as a Japanese prisoner of war on the Burma Railway.

Lamb attended Box Hill High School before taking up a scholarship at Scotch College, Melbourne. He qualified as a pharmacist at the Victorian College of Pharmacy in 1959, where he was a member of the Young Labor Association and active in the New Theatre. He later completed the degree of Bachelor of Arts at the University of Melbourne in 1971 and a diploma in education at Monash University in 1979.

Lamb completed an apprenticeship with Eric Scott, the president of The Pharmacy Guild of Australia. He later worked for periods in South Croydon and Camberwell before becoming manager of a pharmacy at the Northland Shopping Centre in Preston.

== Politics ==
In 1972, he was elected to the Australian House of Representatives as the Labor member for La Trobe. As a backbench member in 1973, Lamb and David McKenzie introduced the Medical Practice Clarification Bill which, if passed, would have allowed abortion in the Australian Capital Territory. The bill was defeated after a conscience vote on 10 May 1973 by 98 votes to 23.

Lamb held the seat of LaTrobe until his defeat in 1975. In 1984 he returned to the House as the member for the new seat of Streeton, which he held until its abolition in 1990. Lamb then contested the seat of Deakin, but was unsuccessful.

== Later life ==
In 2006, Lamb received the Medal of the Order of Australia (OAM) for service to pharmacy, to the Australian Parliament and to the community.

Lamb was awarded a PhD by the Swinburne University of Technology in 2009 for a thesis titled: "Of measures and men: the Victorian Country Party, 1917 to 1945". He was interviewed in 2009 by Jenny Hocking as part of a project on the Whitlam government's legacy.

In 2015, Lamb and three other former MPs brought a case before the High Court of Australia, purporting that reductions to their retirement allowances and limitations on the number of "domestic return trips per year" under the Members of Parliament (Life Gold Pass) Act 2002 was unconstitutional under S51(xxxi) of the Constitution of Australia. They lost the case in 2016, with the court finding that Parliament was entitled to vary the terms of allowances.

Parliament of Australia
Preceded by John Jess	Member for La Trobe; 1972–1975	Succeeded by Marshall Baillieu
New division	Member for Streeton; 1984–1990	Division abolished
