= Cardinia Reservoir =

Cardinia Dam
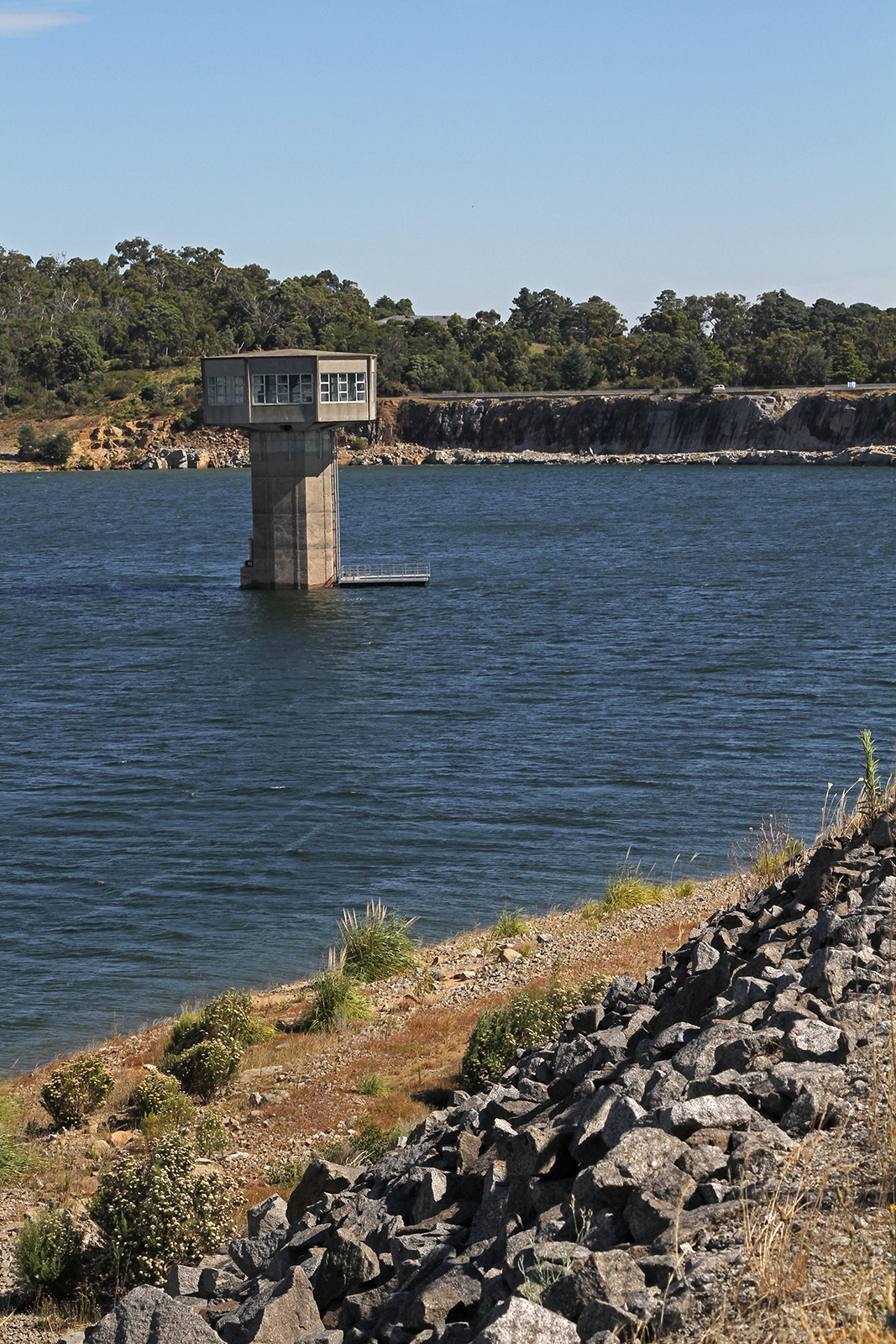
- The control tower and dam walls near the embankment

- Location of the dam in Victoria
- Interactive map of Cardinia Dam
- Country: Australia
- Location: Greater Melbourne, Victoria
- Coordinates: 37°58′17″S 145°25′8″E
- Purpose: Water supply
- Status: Operational
- Construction began: May 1970
- Opening date: 1973
- Construction cost: A$11.4 million
- Built by: Fluor Construction
- Designed by: Snowy Mountains Engineering Corporation
- Owner: Melbourne Water

Dam and spillways
- Type of dam: Rock-fill dam
- Impounds: Cardinia Creek and off-stream
- Height (foundation): 86 m (282 ft)
- Length: 1,542 m (5,059 ft)
- Dam volume: 5.15×10^{6} m^{3} (182×10^{6} cu ft)
- Spillways: 1
- Spillway type: Uncontrolled
- Spillway capacity: 12 m^{3}/s (420 cu ft/s)

Reservoir
- Creates: Cardinia Reservoir
- Total capacity: 286.911 GL (232,603 acre⋅ft)
- Catchment area: 2,800 ha (6,900 acres)
- Surface area: 1,295 ha (3,200 acres)
- Normal elevation: 494 m (1,621 ft) AHD

Cardinia Dam Power Station
- Coordinates: 37°57′6″S 145°23′54″E
- Operator: Pacific Energy
- Type: Conventional
- Annual generation: 3.5 MW (4,700 hp)
- Website melbournewater.com.au

The Cardinia Reservoir is a water supply reservoir formed as a result of the Cardinia Dam, a rock-filled embankment dam – and a series of seven supporting diversionary and saddle dams – across the Cardinia Creek and off-stream flows, located in Emerald–Clematis–Dewhurst in south-eastern suburbs of Melbourne, Victoria, Australia. Completed between 1970 and 1973 at a cost of more than A$11.4 million, the dam wall impounds 287 GL (233,000 acre⋅ft) of water storage that is one of the principal sources of potable water for Greater Melbourne. The reservoir and dam are owned and operated by Melbourne Water.

== Reservoir and dam overview ==
As Melbourne's water supplies struggled through the 1960s the need for additional water storage became evident. Cardinia Creek ran from the Dandenong Ranges to Western Port, passing through some small but well-defined hills south of the outer suburb of Emerald. This site was chosen as being suitable for a new reservoir. In 1966, plans for the construction of the Cardinia and Thomson reservoirs were accepted by the Victorian Government. Construction of the Tarago Reservoir was completed between 1966 and 1969 and it was built by the State Rivers and Water Supply Commission of Victoria (SR&WSC) to improve the capacity of the water supply system to meet the ever increasing demand for water in the district. By 1967, Melbourne struggled through a severe drought and water restrictions were imposed in the summer of 1967–68. As a result, plans for construction of Cardinia and Thomson reservoirs were advanced.

=== Dam description ===
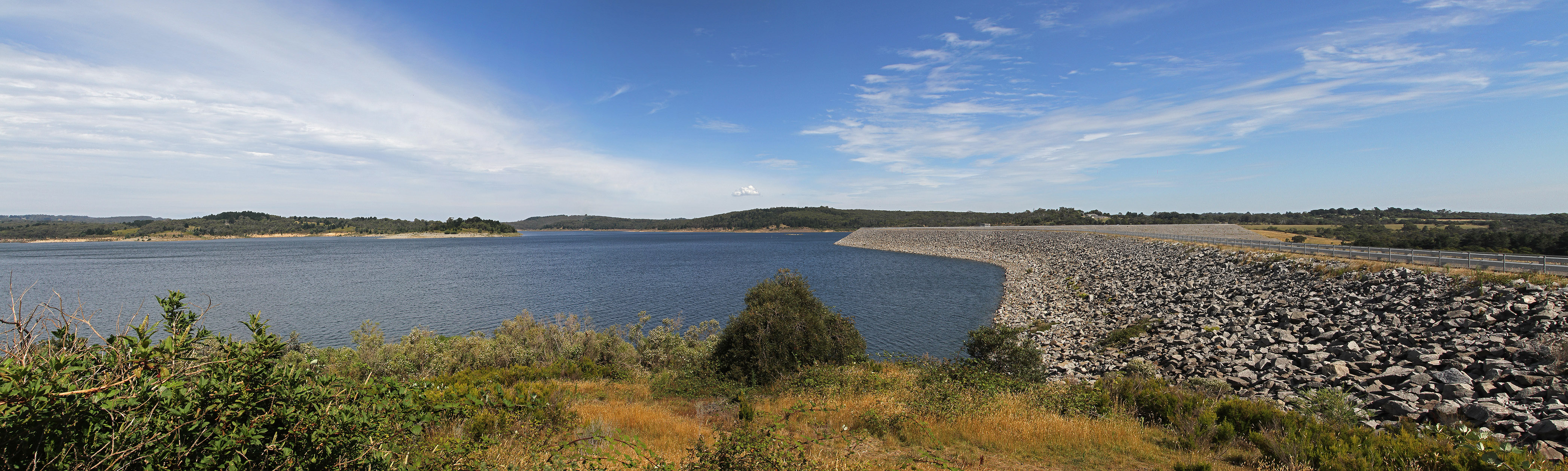
Looking from east to south along the main dam wall

The Cardinia Reservoir was created via the construction of one large rolled earth-fill and rock-fill embankment to serve as the Cardinia Dam wall, and several other saddle and diversionary dams in nearby hills. Built by Fluor Construction and engineered by the Snowy Mountains Engineering Corporation under contract to the Melbourne Metropolitan Board of Works (MMBW), the dam wall height is 86 metres (282 ft) and the main embankment is 1,542 metres (5,059 ft) long. The two saddle dams are between 10 to 16 metres (33 to 52 ft) high and between 323 to 1,219 metres (1,060 to 3,999 ft) long, respectively. The height of the five diversionary dam walls range from 14 to 25 metres (46 to 82 ft) and their length ranges from 85 to 305 metres (279 to 1,001 ft). When full, the Cardinia Reservoir impounds 286.911 gigalitres (232,603 acre⋅ft) and covers 1,295 hectares (3,200 acres), drawn from a catchment area of 50 square kilometres (19 sq mi). The ungated uncontrolled spillway is capable of discharging 12 cubic metres per second (420 cu ft/s).

=== Reservoir description ===
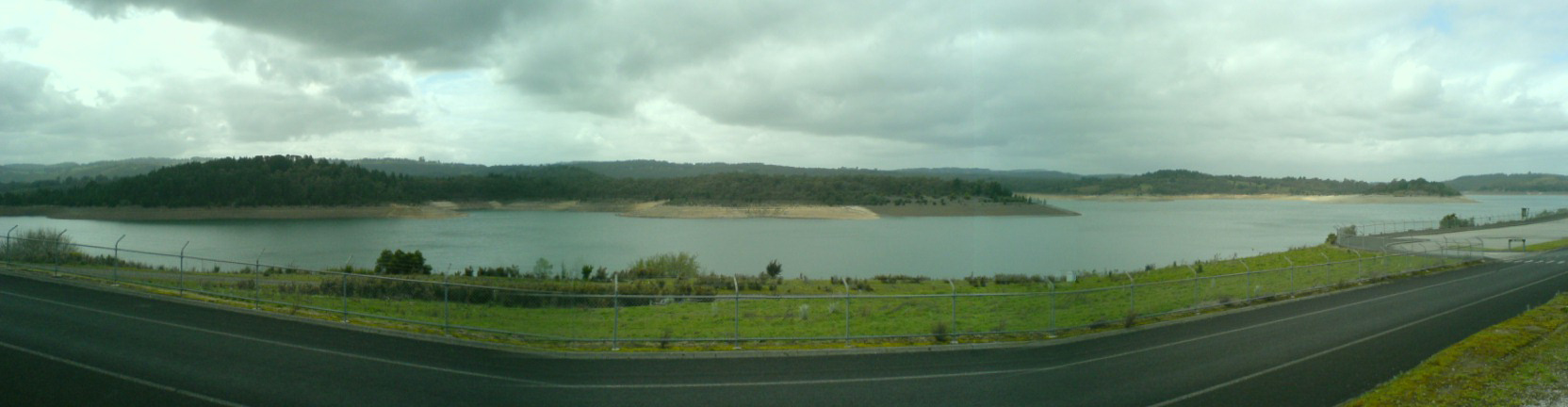
Panoramic view looking east

Construction of the dam was completed in 1973, following which it took another four years to fill, including substantial water transfers from the Silvan Reservoir, via a pipeline, and, when in operation, water from the Victorian Desalination Plant. Water from Cardinia supplies Melbourne's southern and south-eastern suburbs, and the Mornington Peninsula.

As part of the Victorian Government's policy that fluoride should be added to all public water supplies, construction began on local fluoridation plants. In 1981, following continued demand for potable water on the Mornington Peninsula finally exceeded the district's ability to meet its own water supply needs. Despite upgrading of existing facilities, water from the MMBW reservoir at Cardinia was first used to supplement local water supplies. Export of "Australia Pure", a bottled water from Cardinia Reservoir, commenced in 1993 to several European countries and the United States.

In 2012, the Victorian Government allocated $1 million for landscaping work to create a recreational area including picnic areas, playgrounds, carparks and walking tracks in the surrounds of the reservoir.

== Hydroelectric power station ==
The 3.5-megawatt (4,700 hp) Cardinia Dam Power Station, a conventional hydroelectric power station at the outlet of the pipeline generates electricity as water is transferred to the Cardinia Reservoir. The power station is operated by Pacific Energy.

== See also ==
- List of reservoirs and dams in Victoria
- List of power stations in Victoria
