= Britannia railway station, Melbourne =

Former railway station in Melbourne, Australia

Coordinates: 37°46′50″S 145°37′16″E

Britannia

General information
- Line: Warburton
- Platforms: 1
- Tracks: 2

Other information
- Status: Closed

History
- Opened: 1902
- Closed: 1 August 1965
- Former names: Richards's Siding

Services
Preceding station	VicRail	Following station
Yarra Junction towards Lilydale	Warburton line	Wesburn towards Warburton
List of closed railway stations in Melbourne
Location

Britannia (a.k.a. Britannia Siding) was a named siding on the Warburton line in Melbourne, Australia, approximately 1 km east of Yarra Junction. Originally named Richards's Siding, it was built for the use of the nearby Britannia Creek Wood Distillation Plant. It was mainly used for goods but occasionally also served passengers.
