= Launching Place railway station =

Former railway station in Melbourne, Australia

Launching Place
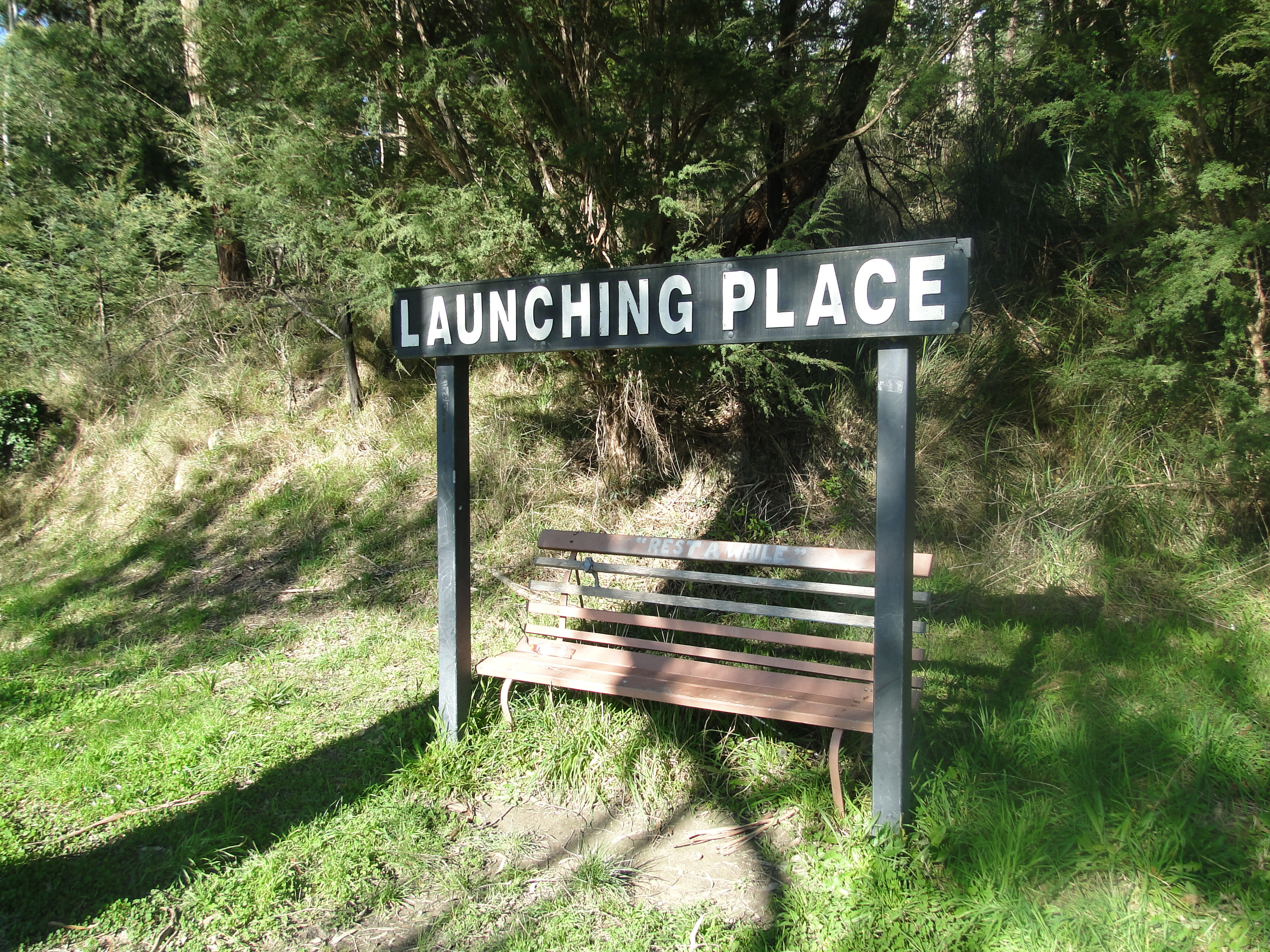
- Name board on Lilydale to Warburton Rail Trail at station site

General information
- Coordinates: 37°46′34″S 145°35′16″E
- Line: Warburton
- Platforms: 1
- Tracks: 1

Other information
- Status: Closed

History
- Opened: 13 November 1901
- Closed: 1 August 1965

Services
Preceding station	VicRail	Following station
Woori Yallock towards Lilydale	Warburton line	Yarra Junction towards Warburton
List of closed railway stations in Melbourne
Location

Launching Place was a railway station on the Warburton line in Victoria, Australia, which served the local town of the same name. It opened with the line in 1901 and operated until the closure of the line in 1965. All that remains of the station are the concrete posts of the platform wall. There is a station name sign on the Lilydale to Warburton Rail Trail at the station site.
