= Wesburn railway station =

Former railway station in Melbourne, Australia

Coordinates: 37°45′56″S 145°38′18″E

Wesburn

General information
- Line: Warburton
- Platforms: 1
- Tracks: 1

Other information
- Status: Closed

History
- Opened: 13 November 1901
- Closed: 1 August 1965
- Former names: West Warburton (1901-1925)

Services
Preceding station	VicRail	Following station
Britannia towards Lilydale	Warburton line	Millgrove towards Warburton
List of closed railway stations in Melbourne
Location

Wesburn was a railway station on the Warburton line in Wesburn, Victoria, Australia. The station opened with the line and operated until the line's closure in 1965. Upon opening, the station was named as West Warburton, receiving the current name of Wesburn in 1925. Today, the only remnant of the station is the crumbling retaining wall of the platform.
