= Killara railway station, Melbourne =

Former railway station in Melbourne, Australia

Killara

General information
- Coordinates: 37°45′29″S 145°29′35″E
- Line: Warburton
- Platforms: 1
- Tracks: 2

Other information
- Status: Closed

History
- Opened: 13 November 1901
- Closed: 1 August 1965

Services
Preceding station	VicRail	Following station
Seville towards Lilydale	Warburton line	Woori Yallock towards Warburton
List of closed railway stations in Melbourne
Location

Killara was a railway station on the Warburton line in Melbourne, Australia, which operated from the time the line opened until it closed in 1965. All that remains is the well-preserved platform retaining wall, as well as the goods platform.
