= Wandin railway station =

Former railway station in Melbourne, Australia

Coordinates: 37°46′38″S 145°25′40″E

Wandin
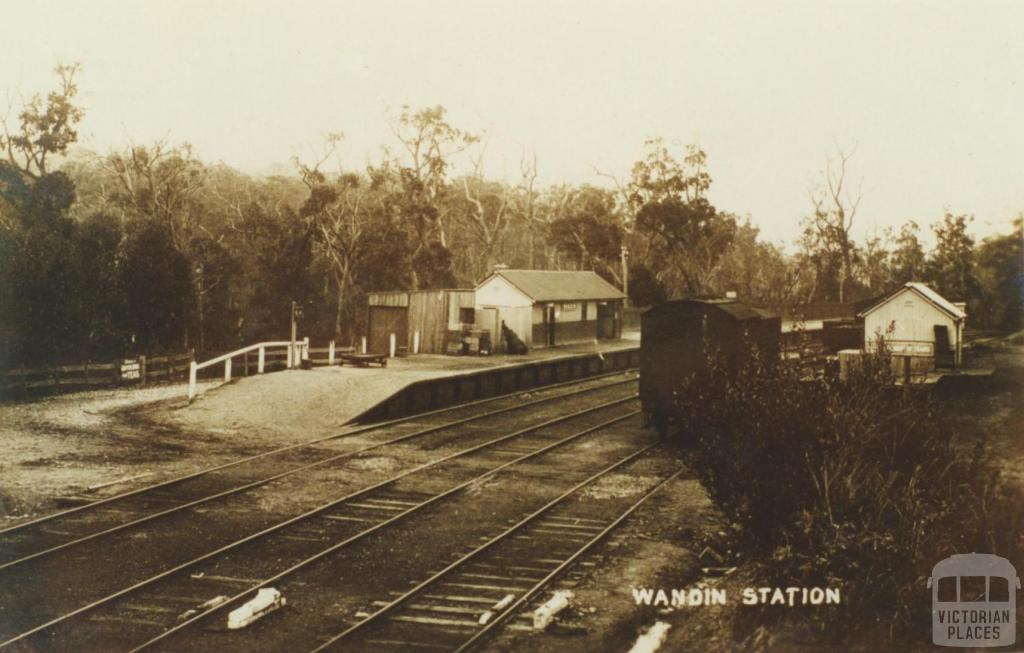

General information
- Line: Warburton
- Platforms: 1
- Tracks: 3

Other information
- Status: Closed

History
- Opened: 13 November 1901
- Closed: 1 August 1965

Services
| Preceding station | VicRail | Following station |
|---|---|---|
| Mount Evelyn towards Lilydale | Warburton line | Seville towards Warburton |
List of closed railway stations in Melbourne
Location

Wandin was a railway station on the Warburton line in Melbourne, Australia. The station operated until the line closed in 1965. All that remains of this station is a well-preserved retaining wall for the station platform.

The station served the village of Wandin.
