= List of closed railway stations in Melbourne =

A number of railway lines and stations which formed part of the greater Melbourne railway network have been closed over time, either in part or in full. The decision to close a railway station has historically been made by the department responsible for rail transport within the Government of Victoria.

Over the history of the Melbourne railway network, a total of eleven complete railway lines, as well as 75 railway stations, have been closed. The most recent railway stations to close are Surrey Hills and Mont Albert stations, which closed on 17 February 2023, due to the level crossing removal project which will see the two stations merge and become Union station, while the most recent railway line to close to traffic is the Port Melbourne railway line, which was closed on 11 October 1987 and subsequently converted to light rail. A number of stations have also been closed and rebuilt at another location, such as West Footscray, which was rebuilt 160 metres away as part of the Regional Rail Link project.

Most closed railway lines have been converted to other uses, such as rail trails or linear parkland. In addition, a number of closed railway stations have been converted for other uses, such as retail stores.

== Closed railway lines ==
Name	Opened	Closed	Stations	Current status	Notes
Broadstore branch line	12 October 1942	1982	1	Dismantled after 1991	
Gembrook line	18 December 1900	April 1954	15	Reopened in 1962 as the Belgrave line between Upper Ferntree Gully and Belgrave. Beyond Belgrave the Puffing Billy Railway reopened in 1962 as a heritage service along the former line.	
Healesville line	1 March 1889	9 December 1980	5	Until 2020, the line remained in place between Lilydale and Yarra Glen, however, the line has since been dismantled as far as Yering, and was dismantled to Yarra Glen throughout 2022. Beyond Yarra Glen the Yarra Valley Railway is undertaking works to restore the line towards Healesville.	
Inner Circle line	22 May 1888	31 July 1981 (North Fitzroy to Royal Park); 21 June 1965 (North Fitzroy to Rushall)	3	Reservation mostly intact and used by the Capital City Trail	
Kew line	19 December 1887	13 May 1957	2	Dismantled and reservation sold.	
Mornington line	10 December 1889	15 June 1981	5	Disused line remains in place between Baxter and Moorooduc. The Mornington Railway Preservation Society operate tourist services between Moorooduc and a rebuilt Mornington station.	
Mont Park line	28 August 1911	30 June 1964	1	Dismantled and reservation sold	
Outer Circle line	3 May 1890	1997 (Fairfield to APM Siding); 1945 (East Kew to East Camberwell section); 1893 (APM Siding to East Kew section)	7	Section between East Camberwell and Alamein remains open as the Alamein Line, with the reservation remaining intact and used as a linear park and is part of the Anniversary Outer Circle Trail north of East Camberwell station.	
Port Melbourne railway line	13 April 1854	16 October 1987	4	Was converted to light rail between Port Junction and Port Melbourne, with tram services commencing to use the line from 18 December 1987. The line is today served by tram route 109 services.	,
Red Hill line	2 December 1921	29 June 1953	3	Dismantled and some of reservation sold, with the remainder existing as a rail trail.	
Rosstown Railway	14 November 1888	1916	4	Dismantled, much remains as linear park or parkland adjacent to Elsternwick station	
St Kilda – Windsor link line	1857	1867	0 (link between two other lines)	Dismantled and reservation sold	
St Kilda railway line	13 May 1857	31 July 1987	4	Was converted to light rail between Port Junction and St Kilda, with tram route 96 commencing to use the line from 20 November 1987	
Spring Vale Cemetery line	7 February 1904	19 December 1951 or 10 December 1950	1	Dismantled and reservation sold	,
Warburton line	13 November 1901	1 August 1965	10	Reservation intact, used for rail-trail	
Whittlesea line	23 December 1889	28 November 1959	4	Line remains open to Mernda. Beyond Mernda the line has been dismantled, with the right of way remaining intact.	

Diagram showing Melbourne's rail network including former and planned lines

== Stations ==
=== Closed ===
Station	Image	Line(s)	Suburb/Town	Opened	Closed	Current status
Greenwich		Werribee	Newport	25 June 1857	December 1857	Demolished
Cremorne		Windsor (Sandringham)	Richmond (now Cremorne)	12 December 1859	22 December 1860	Demolished
Albion & Darlington	The new Albion station built on the site of the old Albion and Darlington railway station	Sunbury	Albion	5 January 1860	1 January 1861	Demolished; replaced by Albion station in 1891
Botanic Gardens		Hawthorn (Lilydale) and Windsor (Sandringham)	East Melbourne	2 March 1859	1863	Demolished
Maidstone		Sunbury	Between Footscray and Albion	2 March 1861	1 April 1865	Demolished
Saltwater River		Williamstown	Between Maribyrnong River and South Kensington	1 October 1859	1867	Demolished
Richmond Park		Glen Waverley	Between Burnley and Heyington stations	24 March 1890	May 1890	Demolished
Fitzroy		Inner Circle	Fitzroy North	8 May 1885	1892 (passenger services)	Demolished
Fulham Grange		Outer Circle	Alphington	24 March 1891	24 April 1893	Demolished
Willsmere		Outer Circle	Kew	24 March 1891	24 April 1893	Demolished
East Kew		Outer Circle	Kew	24 March 1891	24 April 1893	Demolished
Mambourin		Geelong		November 1888	1893	Demolished
Waverley Road		Outer Circle	Malvern East	24 March 1891	9 December 1895	Demolished
Pic Nic		Hawthorn	Burnley	24 September 1860	19 July 1898	Demolished
Garden Vale		Rosstown Railway	Gardenvale	1887	1916	Demolished
Hawthorn Road		Rosstown Railway	Caulfield	1887	1916	Demolished
Booran Road		Rosstown Railway	Glen Huntly	1887	1916	Demolished
Sugar Beet Mill		Rosstown Railway	Carnegie	1887	1916	Demolished
Deepdene		Outer Circle	Balwyn	24 March 1891	9 October 1927	Demolished
Shenley		Outer Circle	Canterbury	24 March 1891	9 October 1927 (passenger services)	Demolished; platform mound remains
Roystead		Outer Circle	Canterbury	14 May 1900	9 October 1927	Demolished
Holden		Sunbury	Between Diggers Rest and Sydenham stations	1860 (late)	11 November 1927	Demolished
North Carlton		Inner Circle	Carlton North	8 May 1885	3 July 1948 (passenger services)	Station building converted to community centre
North Fitzroy		Inner Circle	Fitzroy North	8 May 1885	3 July 1948 (passenger services)	Demolished; platform mound remains
Williamstown Racecourse		Geelong (branch)	Williamstown	6 April 1855	4 June 1951	Demolished
Spring Vale Cemetery		Pakenham (branch)	Springvale	7 February 1904	1952	Demolished
Balnarring		Red Hill	On private property, nearly no remains	2 December 1921	29 June 1953	Demolished
Merricks		Red Hill	Part of equestrian facility	2 December 1921	29 June 1953	Demolished
Red Hill		Red Hill	On private property	2 December 1921	29 June 1953	Demolished
North Campbellfield		Upfield	Near current Upfield station	8 October 1889	5 May 1956	Upfield station opened nearby on 17 August 1959
Campbellfield		Upfield	Camp Road, Campbellfield	8 October 1889	5 May 1956	Demolished
Barker		Kew	Barkers Road, Kew	19 December 1887	13 May 1957	Demolished
Kew		Kew	North of Hawthorn station	19 December 1887	13 May 1957	Demolished
South Morang		Whittlesea	South Morang	23 December 1889	28 November 1959	Demolished; rebuilt as Middle Gorge in 2018
Mernda		Whittlesea	Mernda	23 December 1889	28 November 1959	Demolished; rebuilt in 2018
Yan Yean		Whittlesea	Yan Yean	23 December 1889	28 November 1959	Demolished; platform remains
Whittlesea		Whittlesea	Whittlesea	23 December 1889	28 November 1959	Demolished
Somerton		Craigieburn	Roxburgh Park	13 November 1882	December 1961 (passenger services)	Demolished; replaced with Roxburgh Park in 2007
Mont Park Asylum		Hurstbridge (branch)	MacLeod	28 August 1911	23 June 1964	Demolished
Mount Evelyn		Warburton	Mount Evelyn	13 November 1901	1 August 1965	Demolished,Rebuilt Platform
Wandin		Warburton	Wandin North	13 November 1901	1 August 1965	Demolished; platform wall remains
Seville		Warburton	Seville	13 November 1901	11 August 1965	Demolished; platform wall remains
Killara		Warburton	Seville East	13 November 1901	1 August 1965	Demolished; platform wall remains
Woori Yallock		Warburton	Woori Yallock	13 November 1901	1 August 1965	Demolished; platform wall remains
Launching Place		Warburton	Launching Place	13 November 1901	1 August 1965	Demolished, Platform wall holders remains
Yarra Junction		Warburton	Yarra Junction	13 November 1901	1 August 1965	Intact; Station building houses Upper Yarra Museum
Wesburn		Warburton	Wesburn	13 November 1901	1 August 1965	Demolished; platform wall holders remains
Millgrove		Warburton	Millgrove	13 November 1901	1 August 1965	Demolished
Warburton		Warburton	Warburton	13 November 1901	1 August 1965	Demolished; platform remains
Narrambi		Mornington	Mornington	17 June 1980	15 June 1981	platform material reused for Mornington Tourist railway station
Coldstream		Healesville	Coldstream	15 May 1888	December 1980	Demolished
Yering		Healesville	Yering	15 May 1888	9 December 1980	Demolished
Langwarrin		Stony Point	Langwarrin	1 October 1888	22 June 1981	Demolished
Lyndhurst		Cranbourne	Lyndhurst	1 October 1888	4 October 1981 (passenger services)	Demolished
White City		St Albans (Sunbury)	Tottenham	10 December 1927	4 October 1981	Demolished
Mobiltown		Werribee	Altona North	9 November 1953	18 January 1985	Demolished
Galvin		Werribee (express route)	Altona	22 August 1927	14 April 1985	Demolished
Paisley		Werribee (express route)	Altona North	14 October 1929	14 April 1985	Demolished; platform remains
Williamstown Pier		Williamstown	Williamstown	3 October 1857	25 March 1987	Demolished
Graham		Port Melbourne	Port Melbourne	1 June 1888	10 October 1987	Converted to tram stop and demolished
Montague		Port Melbourne	South Melbourne	2 June 1883	10 October 1987	Converted to tram stop and demolished
North Port		Port Melbourne	Port Melbourne	May 1859	10 October 1987	Converted to tram stop and demolished
Port Melbourne		Port Melbourne	Port Melbourne	13 April 1854	10 October 1987	Converted to tram stop
St Kilda		St Kilda	St Kilda	13 May 1857	31 July 1987	Converted to tram stop and commercial use
South Melbourne		St Kilda	South Melbourne	16 September 1858	31 July 1987	Converted to tram stop and commercial use
Albert Park		St Kilda	Albert Park	27 November 1860	31 July 1987	Converted to tram stop and commercial use
Middle Park		St Kilda	Middle Park	2 July 1883	31 July 1987	Converted to tram stop and commercial use
Stopping Place #16		Mornington	Mornington	30 November 1959	1988	Replaced by Mornington tourist station
APM Siding		Hurstbridge (branch)	Alphington	29 July 1919	1994	Demolished
Werribee Racecourse		Werribee	Werribee	1884	March 1995	Platform intact and signs remain
Princes Bridge		City Loop, Mernda and Hurstbridge	Melbourne	8 February 1859	14 May 1997	Subsumed into Flinders Street station
General Motors		Pakenham	Dandenong South	18 November 1956	28 July 2002	Intact but no legal access to station site
Surrey Hills		Belgrave and Lilydale	Surrey Hills	13 August 1883	17 February 2023	Demolished; replaced with Union station
Mont Albert		Belgrave and Lilydale	Mont Albert	11 August 1890	17 February 2023	Demolished (building relocated); replaced with Union station

=== Future closed ===
Station	Image	Line(s)	Suburb/Town	Opened	Closing	Future status
Anstey		Upfield	Brunswick	15 December 1926	2030	To be demolished and replaced with future Northern station
Brunswick		Upfield	Brunswick	9 September 1884	2030	To be demolished and replaced with future Northern station
Jewell		Upfield	Brunswick	9 September 1884	2030	To be demolished and replaced with future Northern station

=== Rebuilt ===
These stations previously existed in slightly different locations, and/or at a higher or lower level (for example, originally at ground level then lowered into a cutting), to their modern-day counterparts. They may be considered the closed predecessors of today's stations.

- Ardeer (August 1956) – on the Melton line (greater metropolitan line)
- Boronia (1998) – on the Belgrave line; track lowered station rebuilt (with a significantly larger capacity than before the rebuild) lowered as part of grade separation under the intersection of Dorset/Boronia Roads. Surface areas and carpark now integrated with Boronia Junction Shopping Centre.
- Bentleigh (11 June – 29 August 2016) – on the Frankston line; rebuilt as part of the level crossing removal works at North Road, McKinnon Road and Centre Road.
- Box Hill (1983–1985) – on the Belgrave/Lilydale line; track lowered and station incorporated into Box Hill Central shopping centre.
- Canterbury (19 June 1966) – on the Belgrave/Lilydale line; current high level station opened on 15 September 1968 and was completed and the Canterbury Road level crossing closed on 22 December 1968
- Dandenong – Built 8 October 1887, upgraded in 1994–1995 – Change over for the Pakenham and Cranbourne Lines
- Elsternwick (October 1960) – on the Sandringham line; grade separated to remove the level crossing and tram square at Glen Huntly Road.
- Epping (29 November 1959) – terminus of the Epping line until 2012; current station opened on 30 November 1964
- Fawkner (13 July 1903) – on the Upfield line; current station opened on 10 December 1906
- Footscray 1900 – two separate stations for the Williamstown and Sunbury lines were merged into the current site
- Flinders Street
  - Originally Melbourne Terminus (built 1854)
  - Current Flinders Street station (built 1910)
- Gardiner (18 January 2016) – lowered into cutting as part of the removal of a Glen Waverley line rail crossing at Burke Road.
- Ginifer railway station (1 November 2016) – lowered into cutting as part of the removal of a Sunbury line rail crossing at Furlong Road.
- Glen Waverley (24 February 1964) – terminus of the Glen Waverley line
- Heatherdale (2015 - 6 February 2017) track lowered into cutting and station rebuilt as part of the Level Crossing Removal Project.
- Hoppers Crossing (1983) – Originally located on the Western Side of Old Geelong Road (1970–1983) for country trains, rebuilt with longer platforms to cater for Electric Trains on the Eastern Side of Old Geelong Road.
- Laburnum (January 2007) – on the Belgrave/Lilydale line; track lowered to create a rail underpass replacing the level crossing at Middleborough Road.
- Lalor (5 August 1952) – on the Mernda line
- McKinnon (25 March – 1 August 2016) – on the Frankston Line; rebuilt as part of the level crossing removal works at North Road, McKinnon Road and Centre Road.
- Mitcham (25 December 1882 – 2 January 2014) – on the Belgrave/Lilydale line; track lowered to create a rail underpass replacing two level crossings at Mitcham Road and Rooks Road. New station opened 25 January 2014.
- Moorabbin 1959 – on the Frankston line; new station lowered below road level and provision made for the third track (which did not occur for some 20 years), road underpasses established for South Road and the Nepean Highway
- Mornington (1987) – on the Mornington line; new station located on the demolished Stopping Place 16 station and opened 2000
- Narre Warren (3 June 1995) – on the Pakenham line
- Nunawading (January 2010) – on the Belgrave/Lilydale line; track lowered and station rebuilt with a provision made for a third track as part of the Springvale Road grade separation project.
- Officer (13 May 1956) – on the Pakenham line
- Ormond (11 June – 29 August 2016) – on the Frankston line; rebuilt as part of the level crossing removal works at North Road, McKinnon Road and Centre Road.
- Richmond (the gateway to the city for all eastern lines) has had several incarnations:
  - Punt Road low level (8 February 1859 – 12 December 1859)
  - Swan Street low level (12 December 1859 – 1885)
  - Richmond high level (1885 – 26 March 1960) – the opening of this station overlapped with the closure of Swan Street
- Sandown Park (16 May 1955) – on the Pakenham and Cranbourne lines; current station opened on 19 June 1965
- Southern Cross, the main terminus of regional and interstate services in Victoria.
  - Progressively expanded until 1960.
  - Rebuilt station building and platform layout beginning in 1960 as part of the works providing a standard-gauge railway link to Sydney.
  - Beginning 2002, Spencer Street has been substantially rebuilt and renamed Southern Cross. While maintaining the previous platform layout, the station bears no resemblance to the former station.
- St Albans (1 November 2016) - on the Sunbury Line; rebuilt as a part of the Level Crossing Removal works at Main Rd West.
- Tottenham low level (27 July 1982) – on the Sunbury line
- Watergardens (Sydenham) (2002) – on the Sydenham line
- Watsonia was lowered into a cutting when the line between Macleod and Greensborough was duplicated. (Hurstbridge line)
- West Footscray (14 October 2013) – on the Sunbury line; rebuilt as part of the Regional Rail Link project.

== See also ==
- List of closed railway stations in Victoria
