= Seville railway station, Melbourne =

Former railway station in Melbourne, Australia

Coordinates: 37°46′7″S 145°27′31″E

Seville
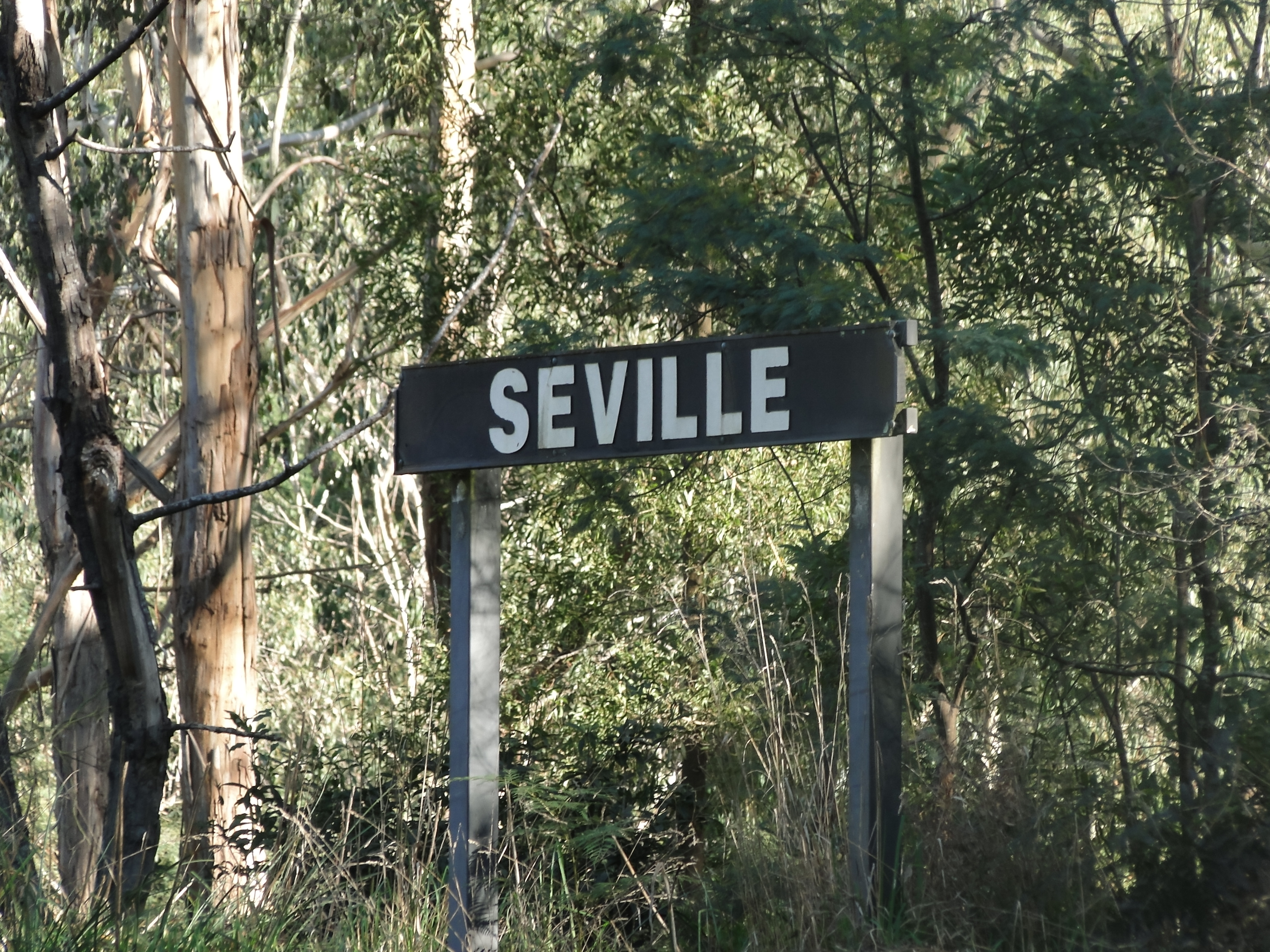

General information
- Line: Warburton
- Platforms: 1
- Tracks: 2

Other information
- Status: Closed

History
- Opened: 13 November 1901
- Closed: 1 August 1965

Services
Preceding station	VicRail	Following station
Wandin towards Lilydale	Warburton line	Killara towards Warburton
List of closed railway stations in Melbourne
Location

Seville was a railway station on the Warburton line in Melbourne, Australia. The station operated until the line closed in 1965. All that remains of this station is a poorly preserved timber retaining wall for the station platform.
