= Yarra Junction railway station =

Former railway station in Melbourne, Australia

Coordinates: 37°46′52″S 145°36′42″E

Yarra Junction
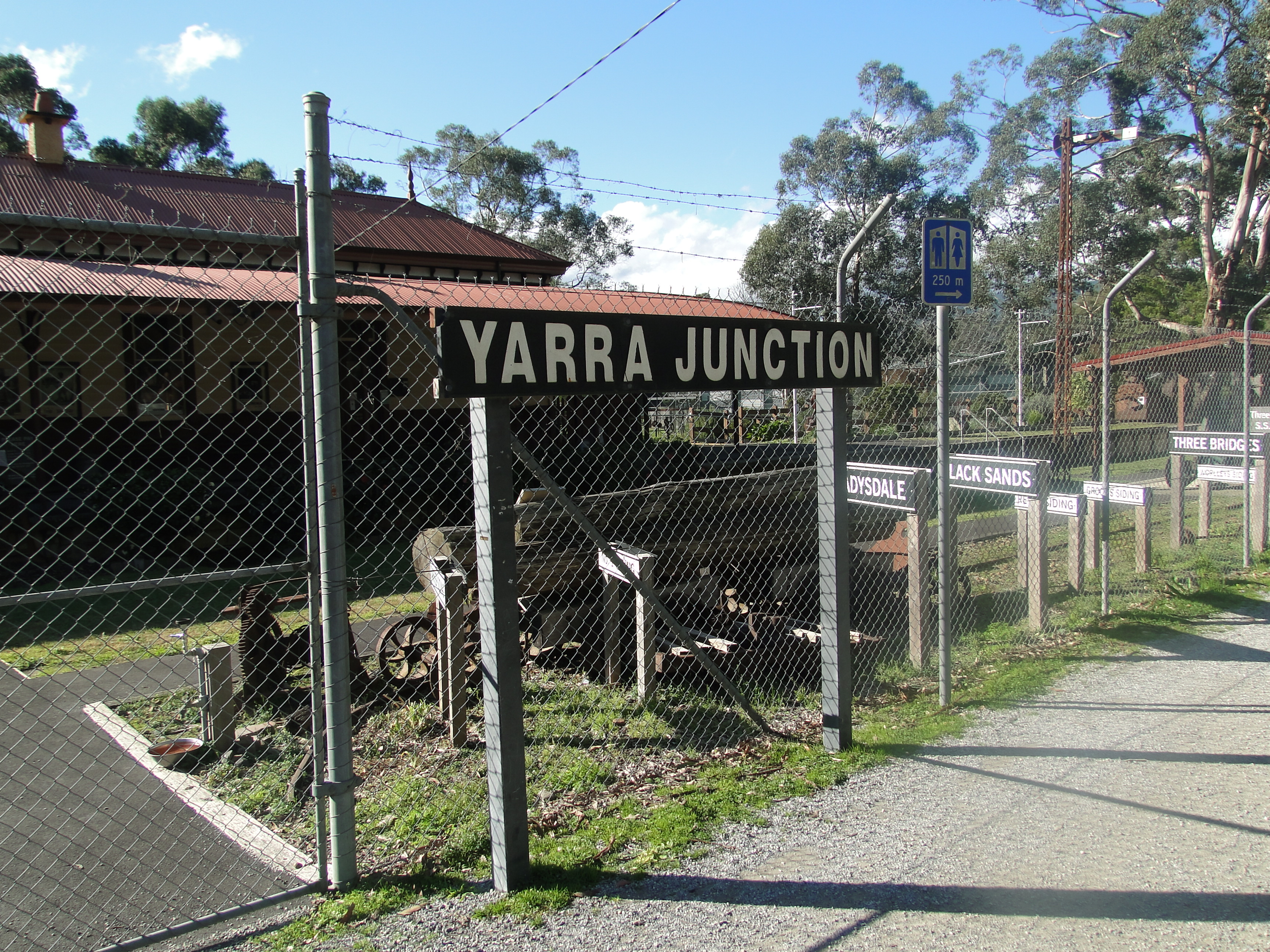

General information
- Line: Warburton
- Platforms: 1
- Tracks: 3

Other information
- Status: Closed

History
- Opened: 13 November 1901
- Closed: 1 August 1965

Services
| Preceding station | VicRail | Following station |
|---|---|---|
| Launching Place towards Lilydale | Warburton line | Britannia towards Warburton |
List of closed railway stations in Melbourne
Location

Yarra Junction was a railway station on the Warburton line east of Melbourne, Australia. The station opened with the line in 1901 and operated until the closure of the line in 1965. The building was constructed in 1888 as the Lilydale railway station and was relocated to Yarra Junction in 1914, due to the provision of a new station at Lilydale. The building now houses the Upper Yarra Museum.

Between 1913 and 1945, Yarra Junction was the junction station for the 3-foot (914 mm) gauge Powelltown Tramway.
