= Mont Albert railway station =

Former railway station in Melbourne, Australia

Mont Albert
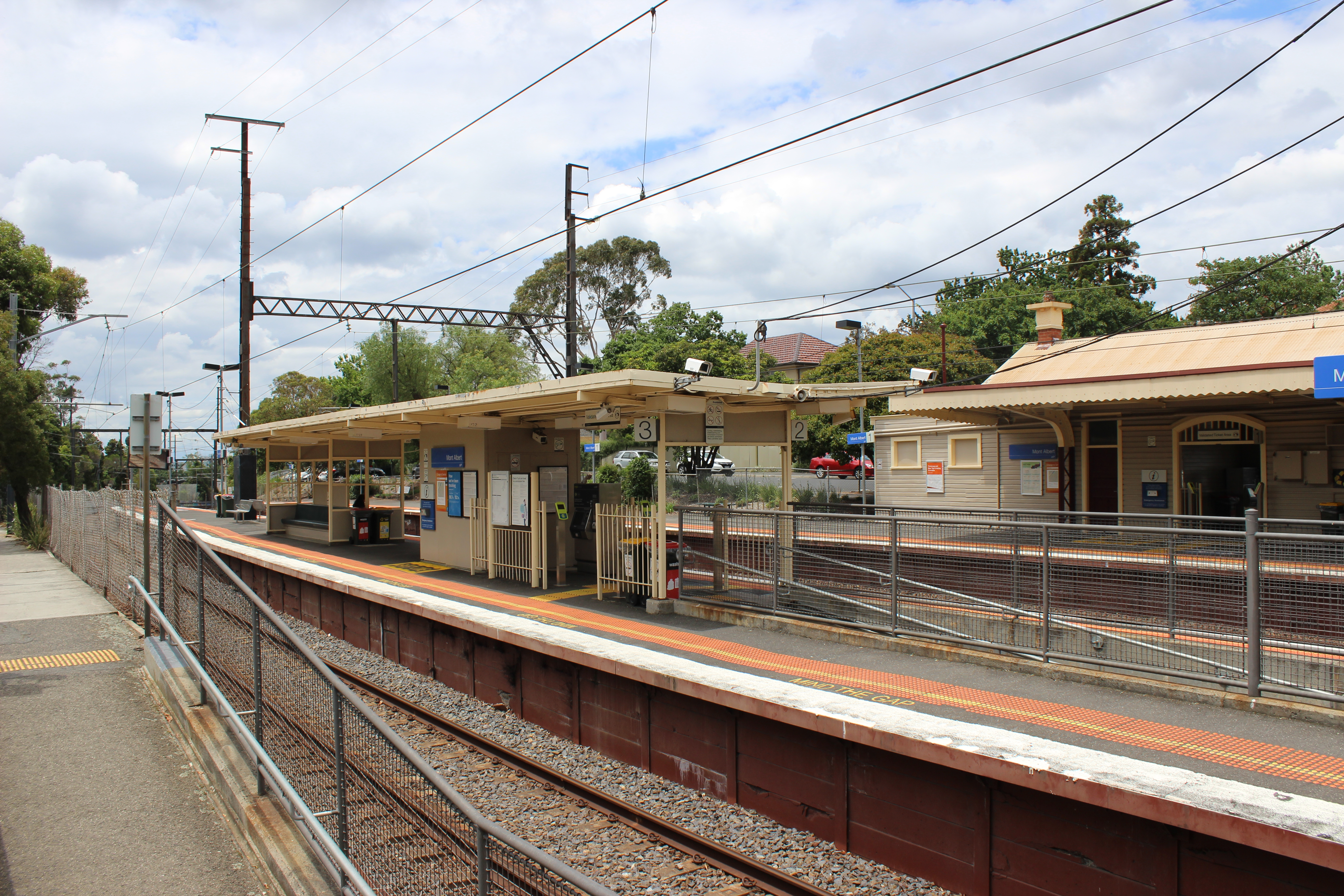
- View of platforms from Beresford Street in December 2018

General information
- Location: Churchill Street, Mont Albert, Victoria; Australia
- Coordinates: 37°49′10″S 145°06′20″E
- System: Closed PTV commuter rail station
- Owner: VicTrack
- Operator: Metro Trains
- Lines: Lilydale; Belgrave
- Distance: 14.63 kilometres from Southern Cross
- Platforms: 3 (1 island, 1 side)
- Tracks: 3
- Connections: Bus

Construction
- Structure type: Ground
- Parking: 30
- Cycle facilities: Yes
- Accessible: Yes

Other information
- Status: Demolished (Platform 1 station building retained for community purposes)
- Station code: MAB
- Fare zone: Myki zone 1/2
- Website: Public Transport Victoria

History
- Opened: 11 August 1890
- Closed: 17 February 2023
- Rebuilt: 19 December 1971
- Electrified: December 1922 (1500 V DC overhead)

Passengers
- 2005–2006: 276,139
- 2006–2007: 308,542 ▲11.73%
- 2007–2008: 331,424 ▲7.41%
- 2008–2009: 354,074 ▲6.83%
- 2009–2010: 368,458 ▲4.06%
- 2010–2011: 353,325 ▼4.1%
- 2011–2012: 315,978 ▼10.57%
- 2012–2013: Not measured
- 2013–2014: 323,005 ▲2.22%
- 2014–2015: 291,184 ▼9.85%
- 2015–2016: 270,334 ▼7.16%
- 2016–2017: 268,495 ▼0.68%
- 2017–2018: 253,964 ▼5.41%
- 2018–2019: 260,854 ▲2.71%
- 2019–2020: 200,300 ▼23.21%
- 2020–2021: 84,300 ▼57.91%
- 2021–2022: 98,450 ▲16.78%
- 2022–2023: 92,300 ▼6.25%

Former services
Preceding station	Metro Trains	Following station
Surrey Hills towards Flinders Street	Lilydale line	Box Hill towards Lilydale or Belgrave
Surrey Hills towards Flinders Street	Belgrave line	Box Hill towards Lilydale or Belgrave
List of closed railway stations in Melbourne
Track layout
- Before station closure (February 2023)
Location

Mont Albert railway station was a commuter railway station on the Lilydale and Belgrave lines, part of the Melbourne railway network. It served the eastern Melbourne suburb of Mont Albert in Victoria, Australia. Mont Albert was a ground level unstaffed station, featuring three platforms, an island platform with two faces and one side platform. It was located between Surrey Hills and Box Hill and it opened on 11 August 1890 and closed on 17 February 2023, due to the works associated with the Level Crossing Removal Project.

== History ==
Mont Albert station opened on 11 August 1890 and, like the suburb itself, was named after Prince Albert, the consort of Queen Victoria.

In 1963, boom barriers replaced hand gates at the former Mont Albert Road level crossing, which was located nearby in the Flinders Street (up) direction of the station.

In the 1960s, track amplification works resulted in the Box Hill-bound platform being rebuilt and converted to an island platform. In December 1971, services on the third track from East Camberwell were extended though the station to Box Hill.

In 2020, it was announced that as part of the removal of level crossings at Union and Mont Albert Roads, both the Mont Albert and nearby Surrey Hills stations would be closed by 2023, with a single new railway station at Union to be constructed between the two stations. On 17 February 2023, the last train to depart from Mont Albert was a Belgrave-bound train at 20:37, before its closure for demolition. The replacement new station, Union, opened on 22 May of that year. The former station building on Platform 1 was refurbished and relocated within the precinct for community use.

== Platforms and services ==
Mont Albert had one island platform (Platforms 2 and 3) and one side platform (Platform 1), linked by an underpass. It was serviced by Metro Trains' Lilydale and Belgrave line services.

Mont Albert platform arrangement
Platform	Line	Destination	Via	Service Type
1	Belgrave line Lilydale line	Flinders Street	City Loop	All stations and limited express services
2	Belgrave line Lilydale line	Lilydale, Belgrave		All stations
3	Belgrave line Lilydale line	Blackburn, Ringwood, Lilydale, Belgrave		All stations

== Transport links ==
At the time of closure, one bus route serviced Mont Albert, under contract to Public Transport Victoria:

- 766 : Box Hill station - Burwood (operated by Ventura Bus Lines)

== Gallery ==
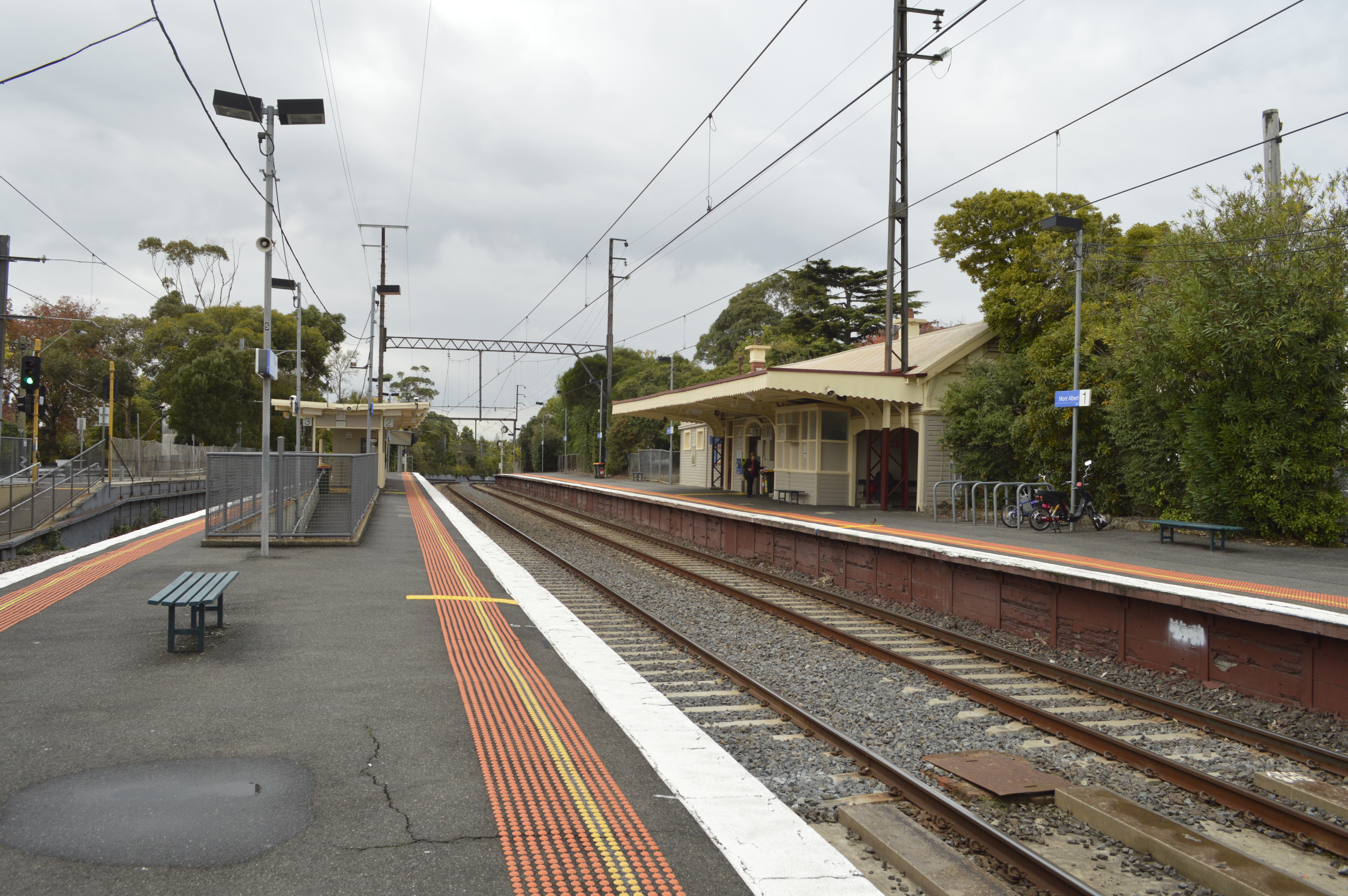
Eastbound view from Platform 2, May 2014

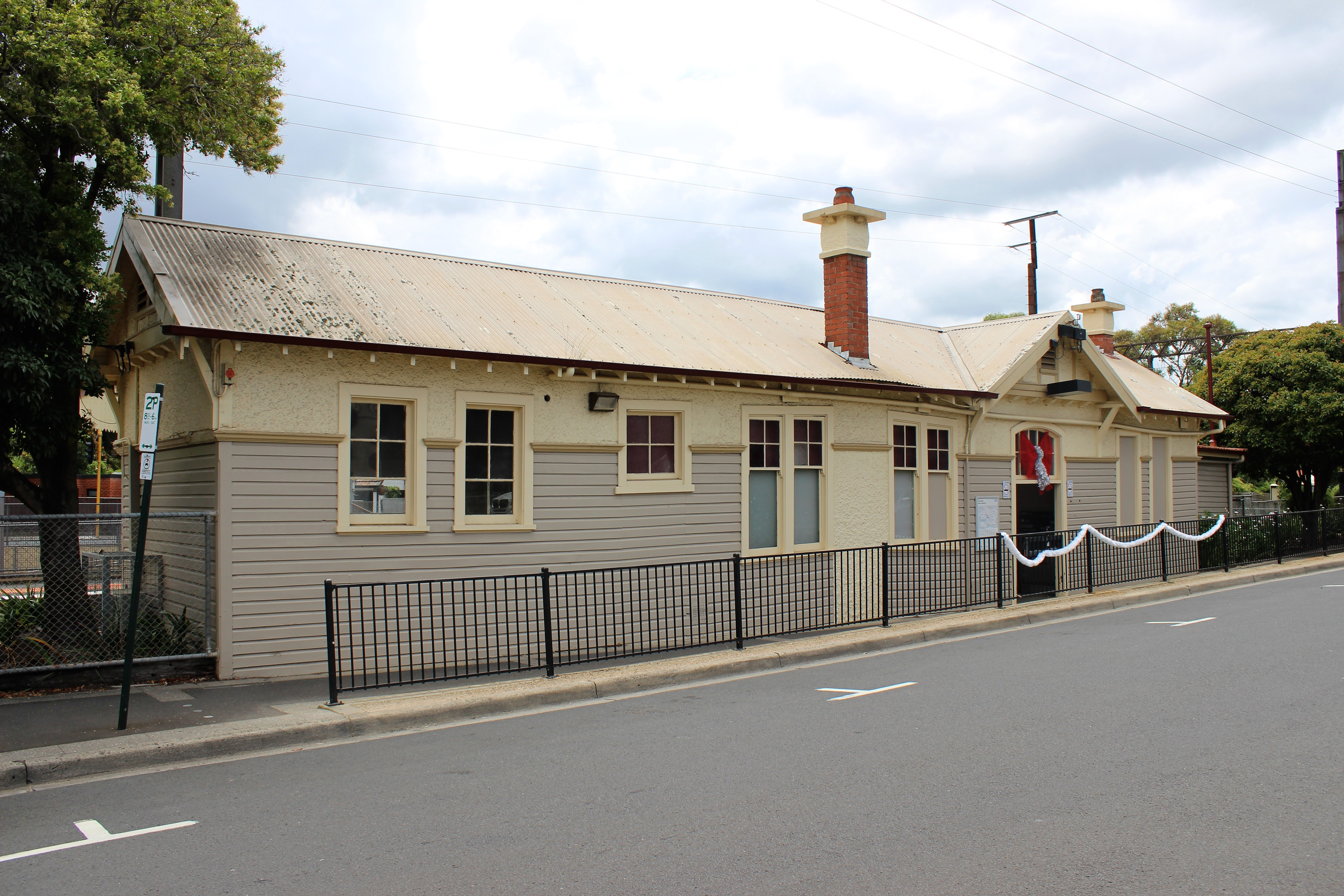
Heritage station building in its original location on Hamilton Street.

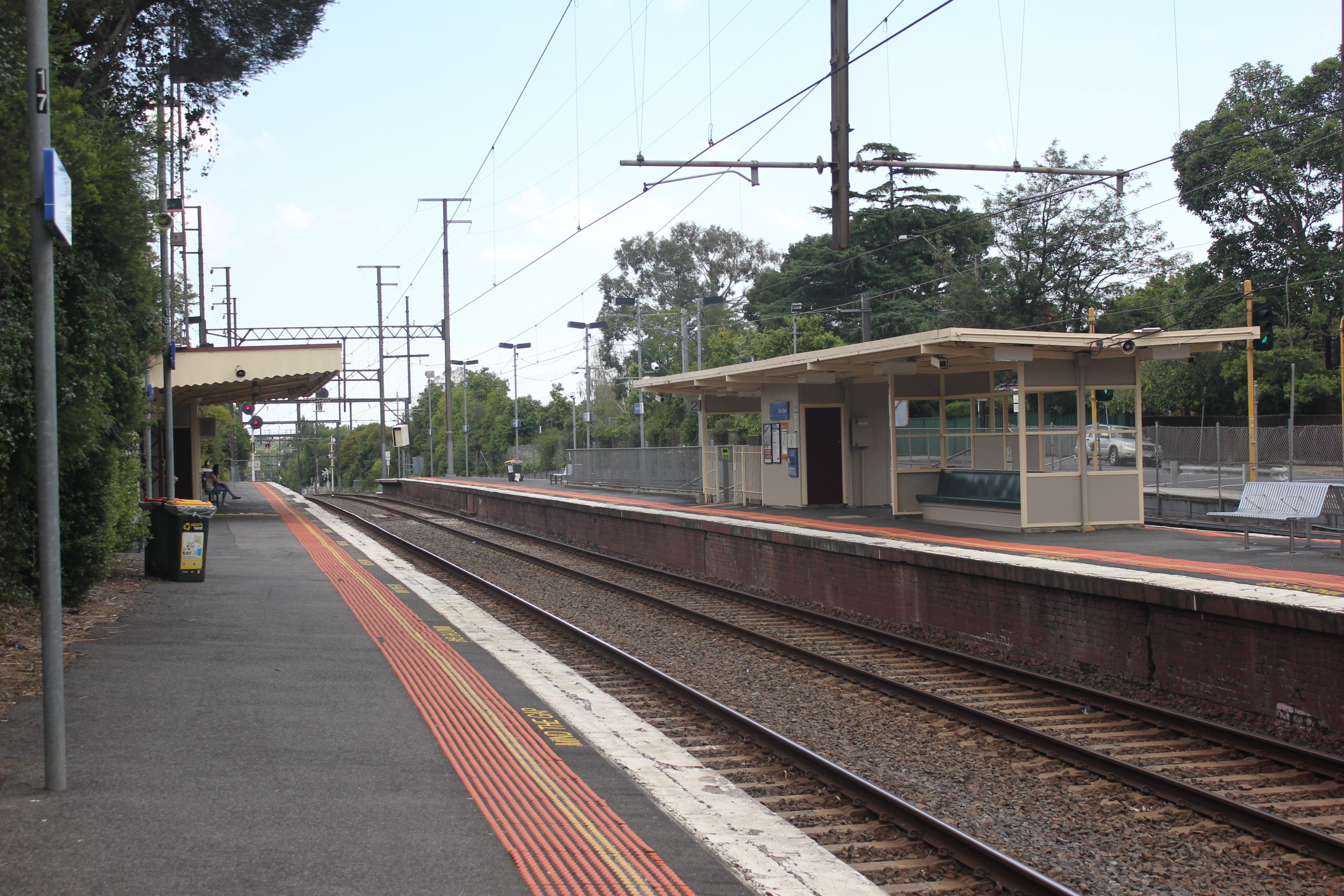
Westbound view from Platform 1, January 2016.
