= Mount Evelyn railway station =

Former railway station in Melbourne, Australia

Mount Evelyn
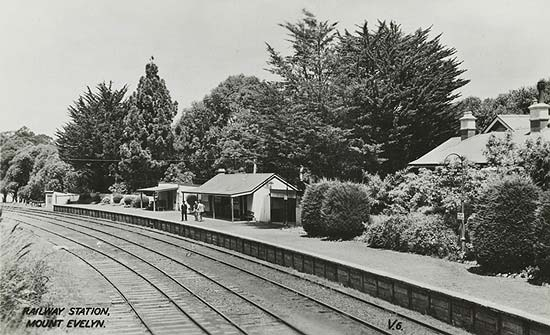

General information
- Coordinates: 37°47′7″S 145°22′45″E
- Line: Warburton
- Platforms: 1
- Tracks: 3

Other information
- Status: Closed

History
- Opened: 13 November 1901
- Closed: 1 August 1965
- Former names: Olinda Vale (1901-1907); Evelyn (1907-1919)

Services
Preceding station	VicRail	Following station
Lilydale Terminus	Warburton line	Wandin towards Warburton
List of closed railway stations in Melbourne
Location

Mount Evelyn was a railway station on the Warburton line in Melbourne, Australia. The station operated from the opening of the line in 1901 until its closure in 1965. Originally called Olinda Vale, the station name was changed to Evelyn in 1907. The station received its current name in 1919, to promote the town's attractions and healthful "mountain" air.

The coming of the railway was an important event in Mount Evelyn's history. Within a year of its opening, the Victorian Railways was offering cheap excursion fares which made the destination very appealing to day-trippers and tourists, especially working class people with limited means for travel. By the 1920s, literally hundreds of excursionists were travelling to Mount Evelyn at weekends and during holiday periods.

The stationmaster's house remains, but has been extensively modified to operate as a community house. The retaining wall of the station platform also exists.
