= Millgrove railway station, Melbourne =

Former railway station in Melbourne, Australia

Millgrove
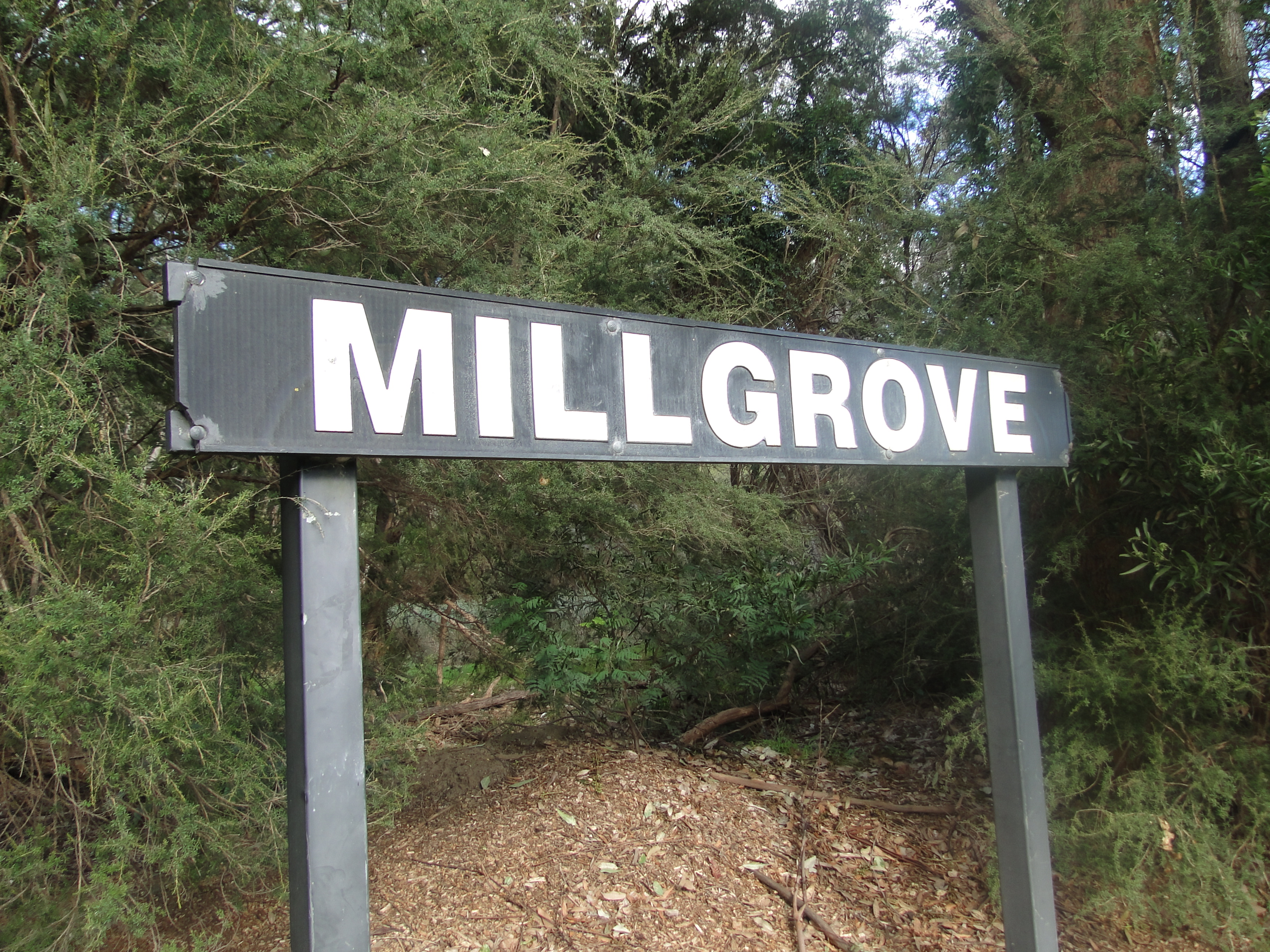

General information
- Coordinates: 37°45′17″S 145°39′15″E
- Line: Warburton
- Platforms: 1
- Tracks: 1

Other information
- Status: Closed

History
- Opened: November 13, 1905
- Closed: 1 August 1965

Services
Preceding station	VicRail	Following station
Wesburn towards Lilydale	Warburton line	Warburton Terminus
List of closed railway stations in Melbourne
Location

Millgrove was a railway station on the Warburton line in Millgrove, Melbourne, Australia. The station opened four years after the line in 1905, and operated until the line's closure in 1965. There are no remains left of this station.
