= Wandin North =

- Town
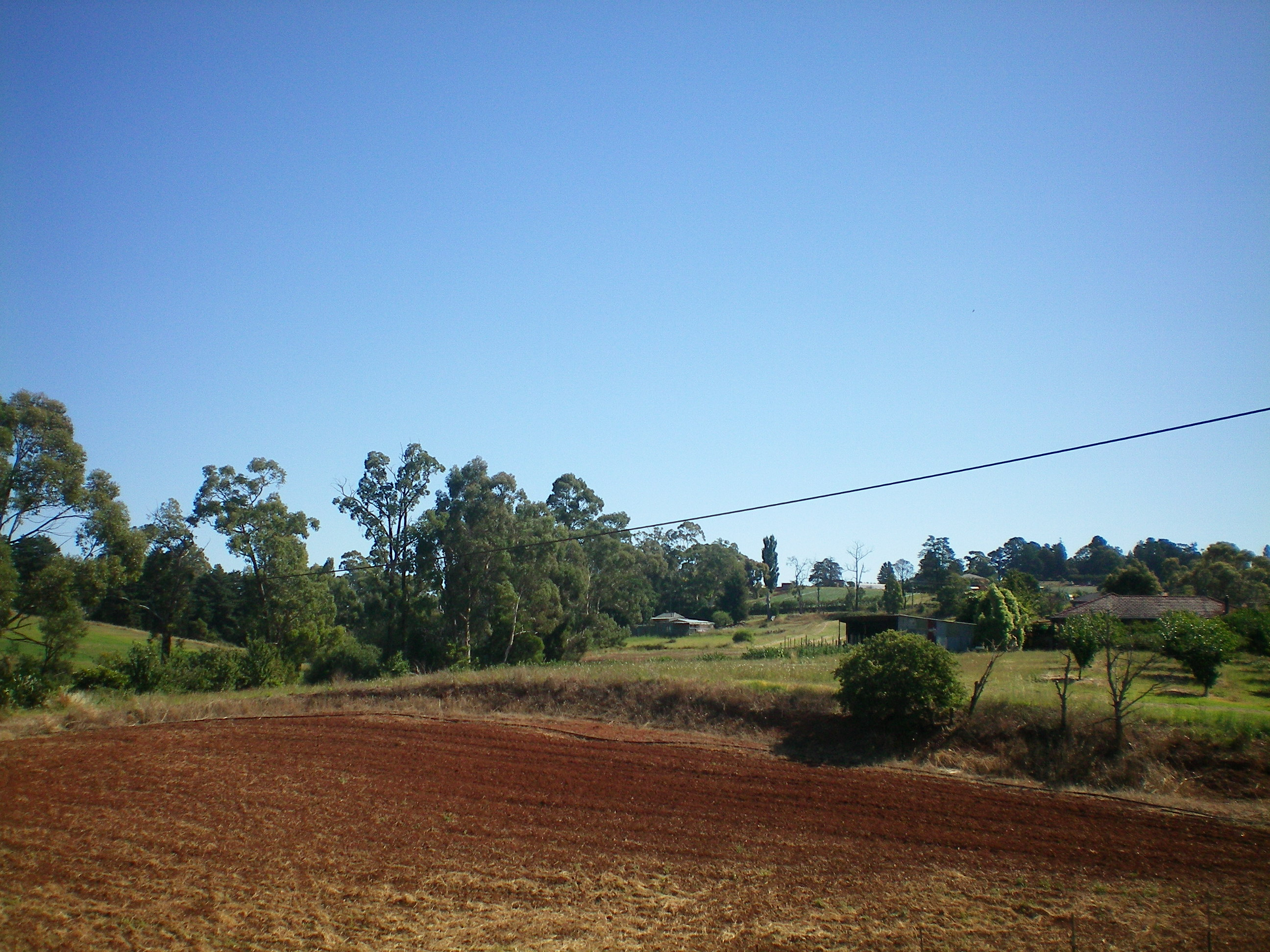
- Pastoral property in Wandin North

- Interactive map of Wandin North
- Coordinates: 37.769°S 145.411°E
- Country: Australia
- State: Victoria
- LGA: Shire of Yarra Ranges
- Location: 49 km (30 mi) from Melbourne; 9 km (5.6 mi) from Lilydale

Government
  - State electorate: Evelyn
  - Federal division: Casey

Area
  - Total: 16.5 km^{2} (6.4 sq mi)
- Elevation: 150 m (490 ft)

Population
  - Total: 3,132 (2021 census)
  - Density: 189.8/km^{2} (491.6/sq mi)
- Postcode: 3139
Localities around Wandin North
Lilydale	Coldstream	Gruyere
Mount Evelyn	Wandin North	Seville
Mount Evelyn	Silvan	Wandin East

Wandin North is a town in Victoria, Australia, 49 km (30 mi) east of the Melbourne central business district, located in the Shire of Yarra Ranges local government area. Wandin North recorded a population of 3,132 at the 2021 census.

== Etymology ==
The name is first recorded in the Parish of Wandin Yallock, surveyed 1866-68. Wandin and Yallock are thought to be Aboriginal words for running water or running stream.

== History ==
The Post Office opened around 1909. An earlier office (1884) named Wandin North was renamed Seville. A Methodist Church opened in 1867. Wandin once hosted a horticultural society, established in 1891.

== Schools ==
There are two schools in Wandin North:

- Wandin Yallock Primary School (established 1870).
- Wandin North Primary School (established 1915).

== Railway ==
Wandin North was the site of the former Wandin railway station. It was part of the branch line to Warburton, which opened in 1901 and closed in 1965. The passenger platform is still present as it was rebuilt. The railway reserve for the former line is now on the Lilydale to Warburton Rail Trail.
