= Yarra Junction =

- Town
- Interactive map of Yarra Junction
- Country: Australia
- State: Victoria
- LGA: Shire of Yarra Ranges
- Location: 66 km (41 mi) from Melbourne; 9 km (5.6 mi) from Warburton; 27 km (17 mi) from Lilydale

Government
  - State electorate: Eildon
  - Federal division: Casey
- Elevation: 152 m (499 ft)

Population
  - Total: 2,875 (2021 census)
- Postcode: 3797
Localities around Yarra Junction
Don Valley		Wesburn
Launching Place	Yarra Junction	Warburton
Hoddles Creek		Gladysdale

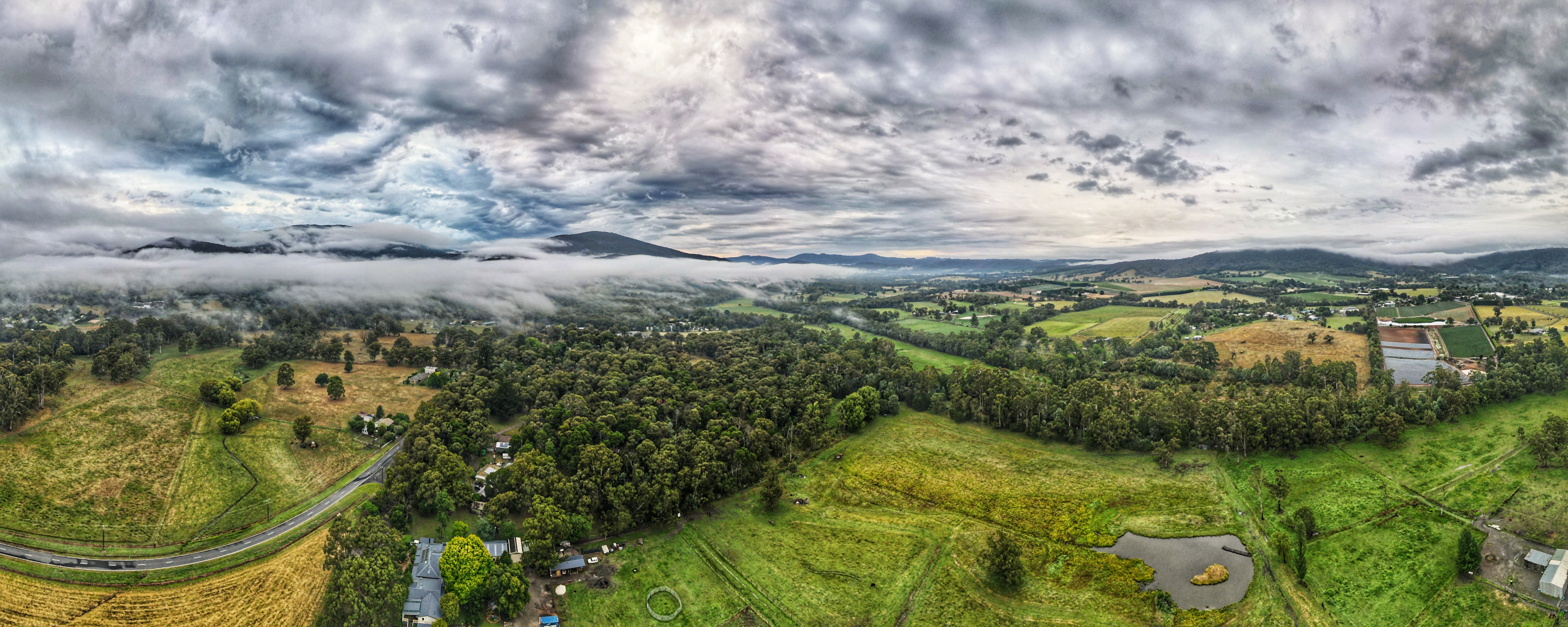
yarra junction panorama

Yarra Junction is a town in Victoria, Australia, 55 km (34 mi) east from Melbourne's central business district, located within the Shire of Yarra Ranges local government area. Yarra Junction recorded a population of 2,875 at the 2021 census.

The township sits at the old junction of timber tramways and main rail line not the Yarra and Little Yarra Rivers as implied by its name (this is a common misunderstanding). Yarra Junction is a small town with many activities, services and amenities including Cunningham's Irish Inn and an RSL. Yarra Junction is said to be the functional hub of the Upper Yarra Valley.

== History ==
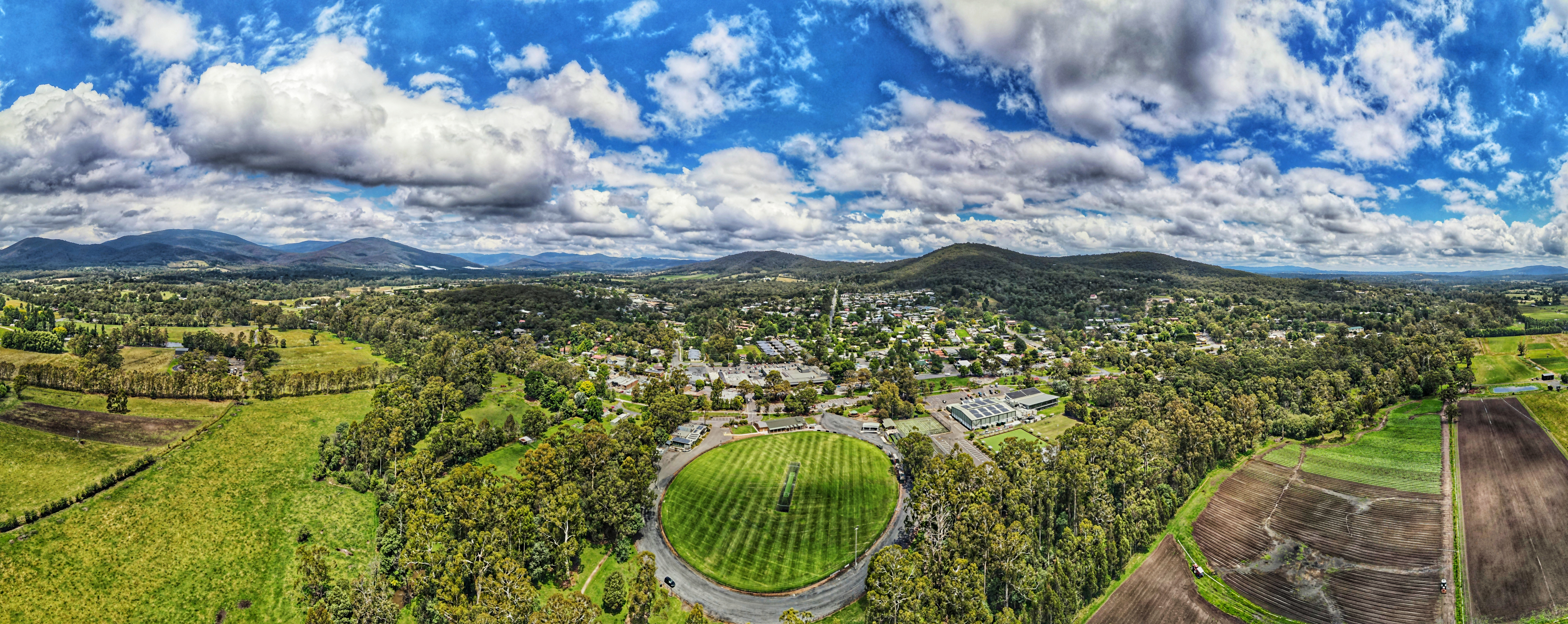
Yarra Junction, 2021

The Post Office opened on 20 November 1901, a week after the opening of the Yarra Junction railway station as part of the railway line to Warburton. Between 1913 and 1945, Yarra Junction was the junction station for the 3-foot (914 mm) gauge Powelltown Tramway. The railway, and the station, closed on 1 August 1965. The station building was constructed in 1888 at Lilydale railway station, but was relocated to Yarra Junction in 1914, following the construction of a new station building at Lilydale. The former station now houses the Upper Yarra Museum.

=== Heritage listing ===
The following place in Yarra Junction is listed on the Victorian Heritage Register:

- Camp Eureka, 90–100 Tarrango Road

== Education ==
Yarra Junction has five schools, Upper Yarra Secondary College, Yarra Junction Primary School, St Joseph's Primary School and the Little Yarra Steiner School. It is also home to the Cire Community School (previously called Yarra Valley Community School), an independent school for students for whom mainstream schooling has not been successful.

In addition to these schools, there is also a rural country campus for Caulfield Grammar School. The Yarra Junction Campus was established in 1949 and it was the first of its kind in Australia.

== Sport ==
The town has an Australian Rules football team competing in the Yarra Valley Mountain District Football League. Former Richmond premiership ruckman Jack Dyer (also known as Captain Blood) grew up in the town before moving to Melbourne in his late teens for school.

== See also ==
- Yarra Junction railway station - The station still exists but is no longer in use.
