= General Motors railway station =

Former railway station in Victoria, Australia

General Motors
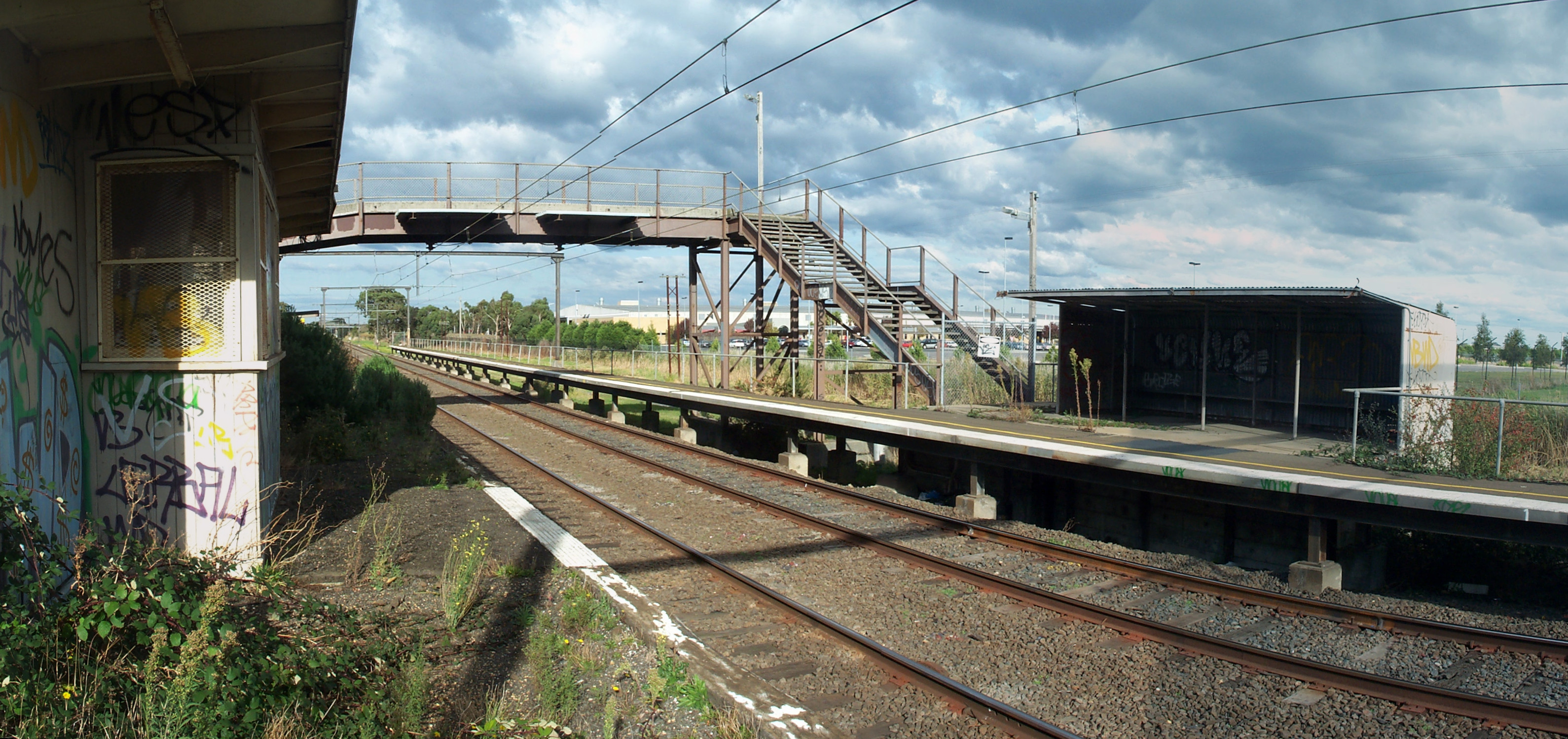
- South-east-bound view from Platform 2 in 2008

General information
- Coordinates: 38°00′37″S 145°14′42″E
- System: Closed commuter rail station
- Owner: VicTrack
- Line: Pakenham
- Distance: 35.08 kilometres from Southern Cross
- Platforms: 2 side
- Tracks: 2

Construction
- Structure type: At-grade
- Accessible: No

Other information
- Status: Disused
- Station code: GMH
- Fare zone: 2

History
- Opened: 18 November 1956; 69 years ago
- Closed: 28 July 2002; 24 years ago
- Electrified: 1500 V DC overhead

Former services
Preceding station	M-Train	Following station
Dandenong towards Flinders Street	Pakenham line	Hallam towards Pakenham
List of closed railway stations in Melbourne
Track layout
Location

General Motors is a disused railway station on the Gippsland line located between Dandenong and Hallam stations in the Melbourne suburb of Dandenong South. It was previously served by Pakenham line commuter rail services, as part of the suburban rail system.

== History ==
General Motors station was originally opened as a "special platform" on 1 October 1956 to service the General Motors Holden car factory to the north. An alternate date for the opening is 18 November 1956. Work on the adjacent General Motors Holden factory commenced with the purchase of 152 acres (0.62 km^{2}) of land in 1951, construction commencing in 1955, and completed in 1956. Construction of the station was paid for by General Motors.

The station opened at the site of a number of private railway sidings, two years after electrification of the line through it was commissioned, and at a time when suburban services to Pakenham did not exist. As a result, only a single platform was provided on the north side on the down (Pakenham bound) track, and services operated as extensions of Dandenong trains at factory opening and closing times. This was altered on 20 January 1975, when suburban services were extended from Dandenong to Pakenham. The up (Melbourne bound) platform and footbridge to the north was provided in late 1974, and Pakenham trains were timetabled to stop at the station at factory opening and closing times.

The station was provided with a crossover between the double track lines, and a signal box to control it. A number of railway sidings also branched from the station in a westerly direction along the main line. In 1979, they served the International Harvester, Heinz, and General Motors Holden factories. The station could not be accessed from public roads, with the only way in and out via a gate into the General Motors Holden factory.

In 1991, the General Motors factory closed down, leaving the station essentially isolated. A notice was issued by the Public Transport Corporation stating that the station was to close from 5 November 1991, but it remained open for a further eleven years, despite the closure and demolition of the factory and the fact that the footbridge now led to a fenced-off, empty paddock where the factory had once stood. It was estimated to be the least-patronised station in the entire city network, with only an average of 11 passengers using it a day. By the time it closed, only eight trains stopped at the station each day, four each way.

Visitors from the Signalling Record Society had to obtain permission from General Motors and be accompanied by a security guard while at the station. The Rail Appreciation Association Victoria was another group that organised a trip to the station, travelling via ordinary train services. Another group of railfans visited the station the last day of operation, again using regular trains.

The only means of accessing the station was to jump off the platform and cross over the tracks on foot, since no new access paths were built after the closure of the factory. This meant that it was one of only two stations on the Melbourne network to be inaccessible to wheelchairs (the other one being Heyington). The Public Transport Users Association argued that it should be upgraded due to industrial growth in the area, but M>Train, which operated the Pakenham line at the time, requested permission to close the station in 2002 due to "safety concerns and a lack of legal access". The last train stopped at the station at 4:42pm on 26 July 2002, and the station officially closed on 28 July.

== Platforms and services ==
=== Services at closure ===
General Motors platform arrangement
Platform	Line	Destination	Via	Service Pattern	Notes
1	Pakenham line	Flinders Street	City Loop	All stations and limited express services	Services only stopped when workers went home
2	Pakenham line	Pakenham		All stations	Services only stopped when workers arrived

== Current status ==
The remains of the building on the "down" platform at General Motors, viewed from a passing train in September 2026

Posters about the closure referred to a "temporary suspension", while M>Train did not rule out the possibility of re-opening the station in the future, the M>Train network is now operated by Metro Trains Melbourne. In 2015, a spokeswoman for Public Transport Victoria said that there were no plans by either Metro Trains or PTV to re-open the station.

If the station is to be re-opened in the future, then substantial works would be required, including extensive repairs and resurfacing of both platforms and the footbridge above the station, the demolition of the building and other fixtures, the construction of new facilities, and bringing the station up to DDA compliance.

In 2004, General Motors was still listed in the Pakenham line pocket timetable, and in 2005 the Metlink trip planner was still displaying services to the station, despite the closure. However, the station is no longer displayed on any public transport maps. In late 2004, all signage was removed, KEEP OUT signage was installed, and access to the footbridge between platforms was fenced off. Connex Melbourne continued to list General Motors on timetables for the Pakenham line until late 2006. Station announcements on the line continued to announce that trains would stop at "all stations except General Motors" until April 2007.

== See also ==
- List of closed railway stations in Melbourne
- Redcar British Steel railway station, a similar railway station in England
- Umi-Shibaura Station, a similar still-operation railway station in Japan
