= Lilydale to Warburton Rail Trail =

Rail trail in Victoria, Australia

Lilydale-Warburton Rail Trail
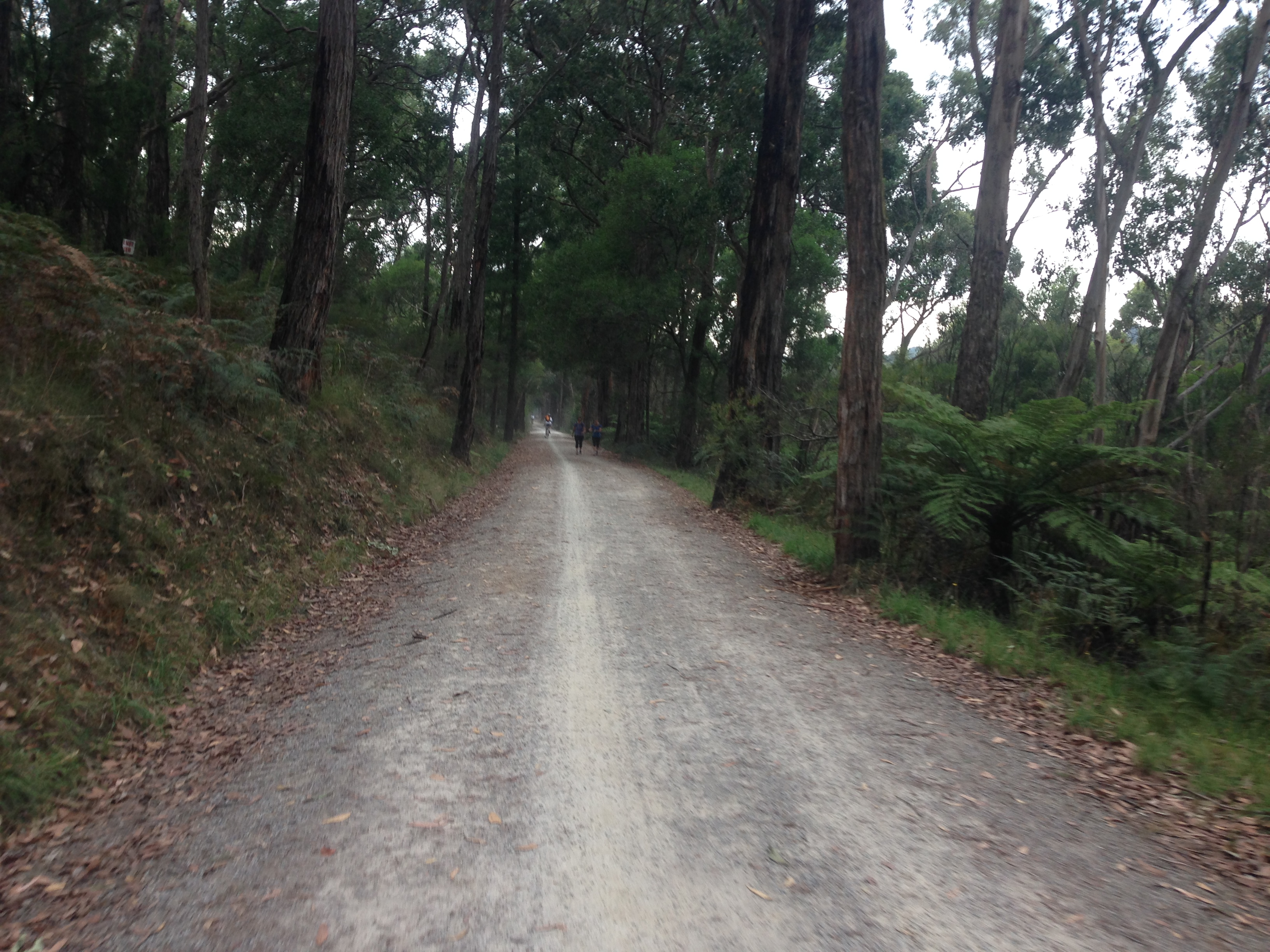
- Warburton rail trail, Mount Evelyn
- Length: 40 km (25 mi)
- Location: Melbourne, Victoria, Australia
- Difficulty: Easy to moderate
- Hazards: Uncontrolled crossings of the Warburton Highway
- Surface: Asphalt, Fine gravel
- Hills: Gentle
- Water: Drinking fountains and bottle refill at several locations
- Train: Lilydale line to start of route at Lilydale station
- Bus: PTV route 683 along the entire trail
- Parking: All day parking at most towns along the trail

Trail map
- Lilydale to Warburton Rail Trail Map

The Lilydale to Warburton Rail Trail (also known as the Warburton Trail) is a walking, cycling and horse-riding track in eastern Victoria, Australia. It runs a distance of 40 km (25 mi) between Lilydale and Warburton, along the former Warburton railway line in the Yarra Valley.

The trail begins at Lilydale railway station and passes through the townships of Mount Evelyn, Wandin North, Seville, Seville East, Woori Yallock, Launching Place, Yarra Junction, Wesburn and Millgrove, ending at Warburton.

== History ==
After the closure of the Warburton railway line in July 1965 and the dismantling of the track in the early 1970's, the land remained vacant. In 1984, and again in 1996, the state government investigated selling the land but withdrew the proposal, in part due to community opposition.

Since its establishment in 1996, the trail has been continually developed and maintained by a combination of local volunteers, particularly the Friends of the Lilydale to Warburton Rail Trail, as well the Local Council and State and Federal governments. Over several years a significant amount of effort went into clearing the land, restoring 13 bridges and surfacing of the trail. Negotiations were undertaken with neighbouring farmers who had previously occupied the reserve, to erect fencing and gates where necessary.

By 1998, the trail was continuous from the Maroondah Highway, Lilydale to the site of the former Warburton station, with only a relatively short section between Lilydale Station and Maroondah Highway remaining incomplete.

The remaining section of the trail, including a bridge across the Maroondah Highway, was completed in early 2011. The next improvement to the trail is a crossing at York Road in Mount Evelyn, which should be completed mid-2011.

== Deviation ==
Although the trail is continuous from Lilydale to Warburton, it does not completely adhere to the former Warburton rail line's alignment. Some 700 metres (2,300 ft) from Lilydale station, just before a historic bridge where the original alignment of Anderson Street passed over the railway, the trail deviates around the north, east and south of Mount Lilydale Mercy College. The school currently leases the land formerly occupied by the railway, which connects the old school grounds south-west of the line with an extension on the north-east. The southern end of the deviation rises to meet the original alignment of the trail at a steep grade that makes it unsuitable for wheelchairs.

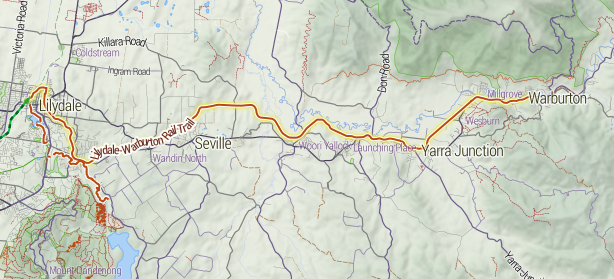
Map of the Lilydale to Warburton Rail Trail

== Gallery ==
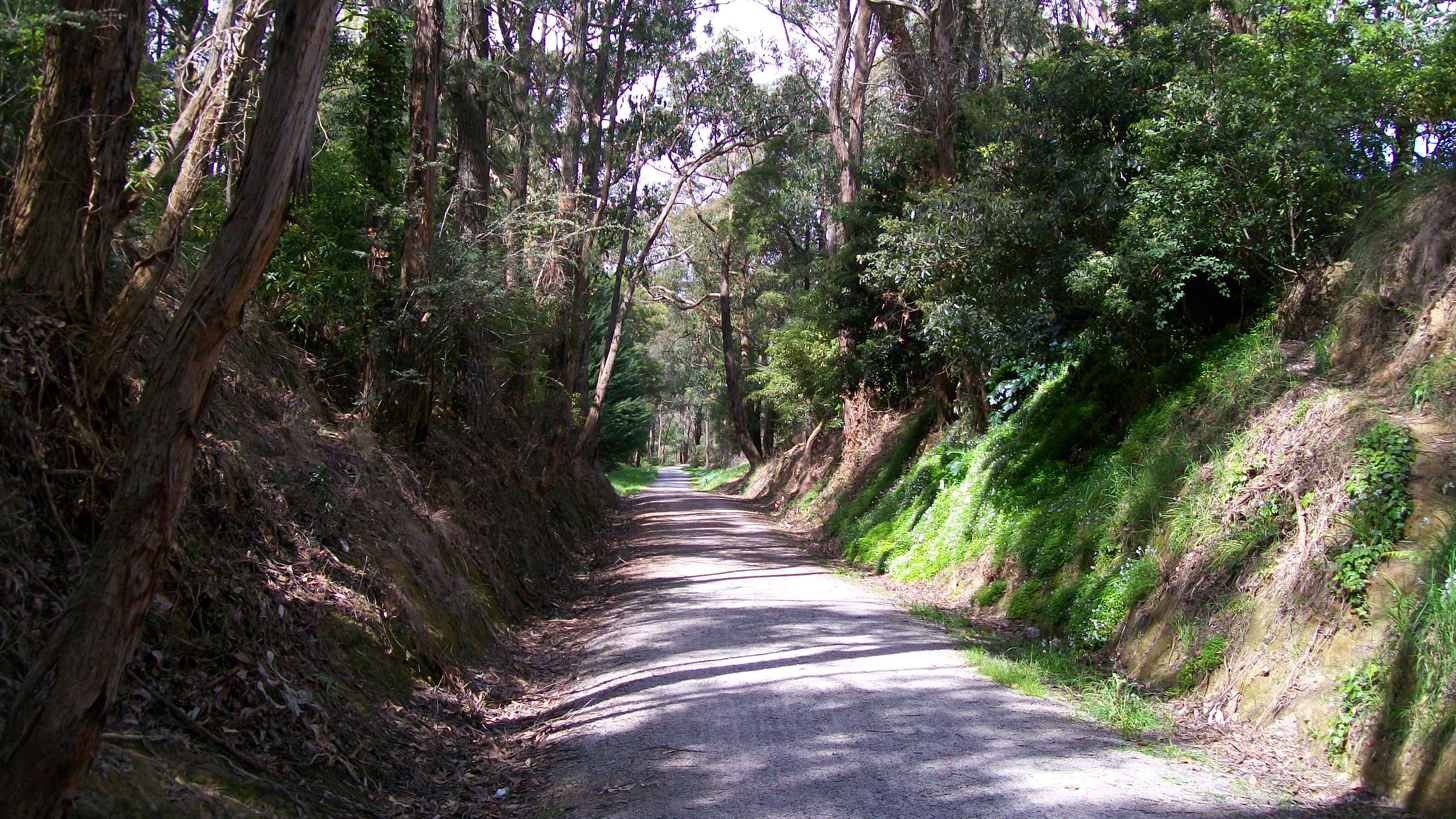
Warburton rail trail, Mount Evelyn

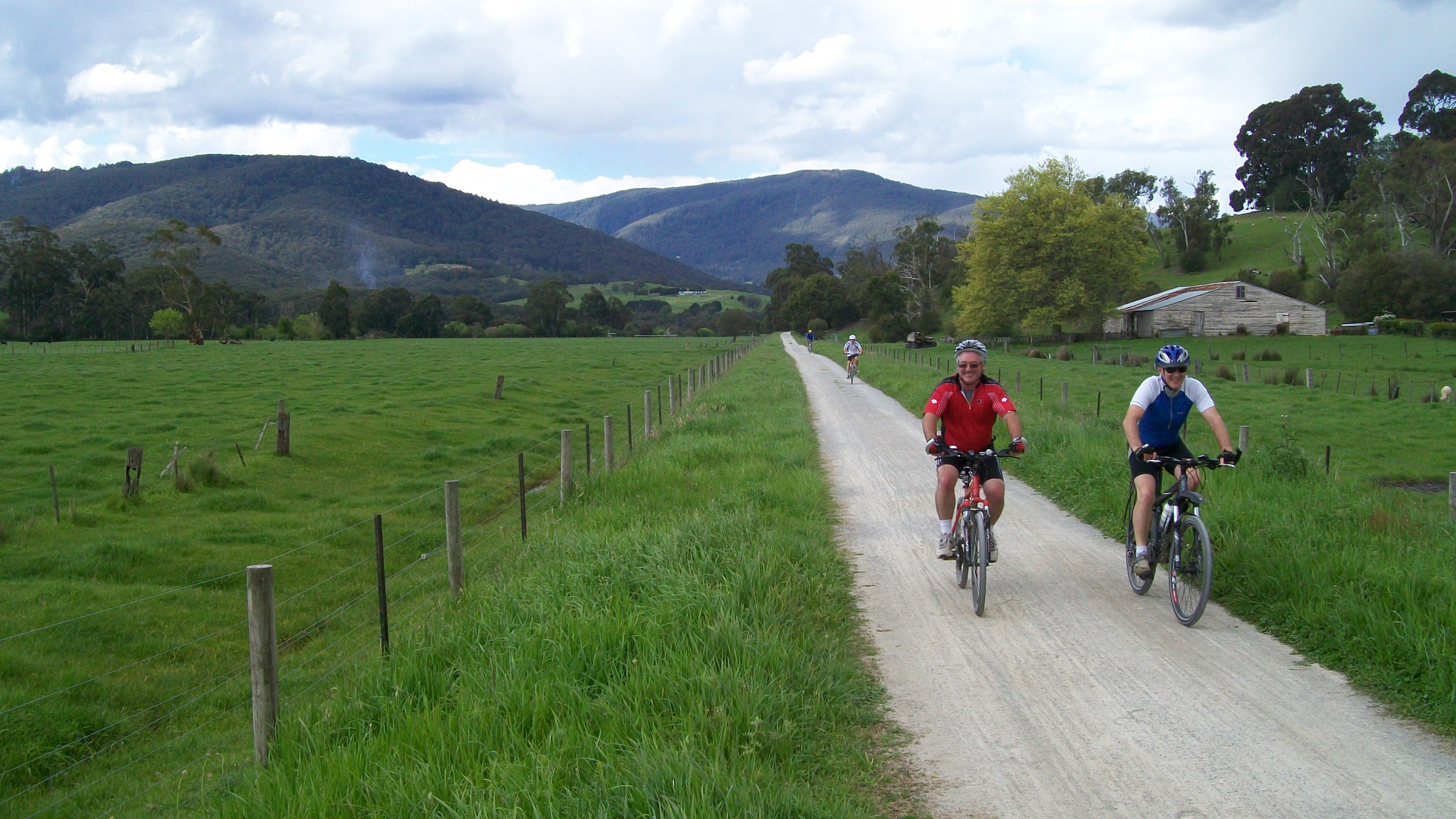
Warburton rail trail, Seville

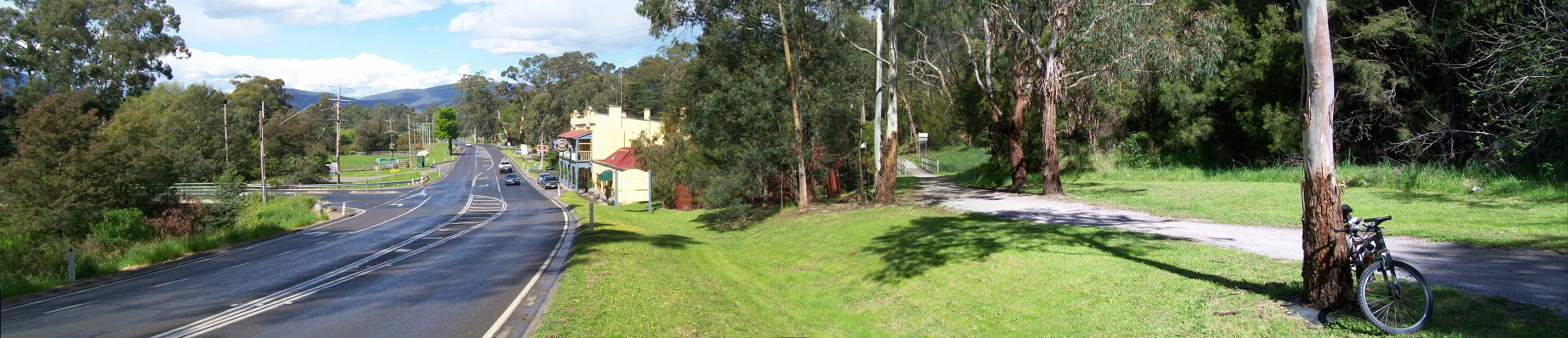
Warburton rail trail, Launching Place

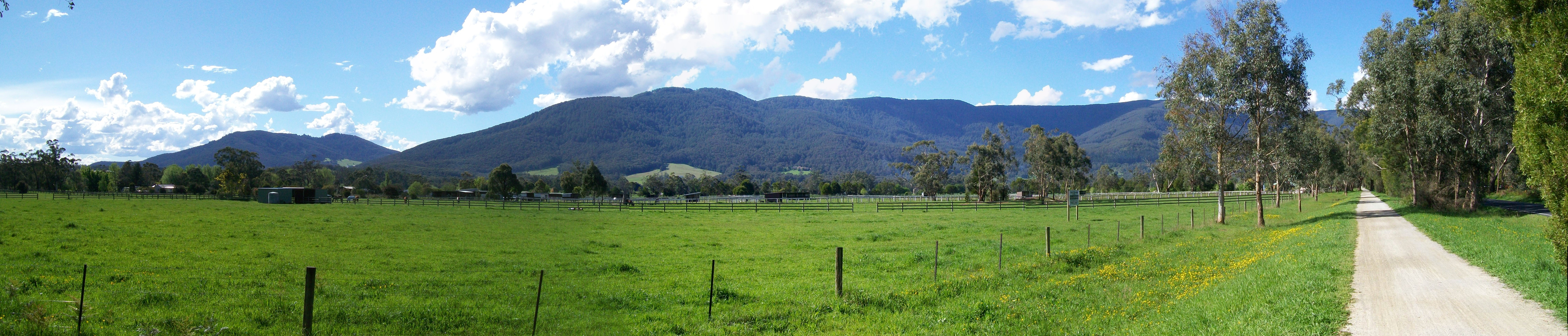
Warburton rail trail, Wesburn

== See also ==
- Bicycle Trails in Victoria
