= Mee's Bus Lines =

Australian bus operator

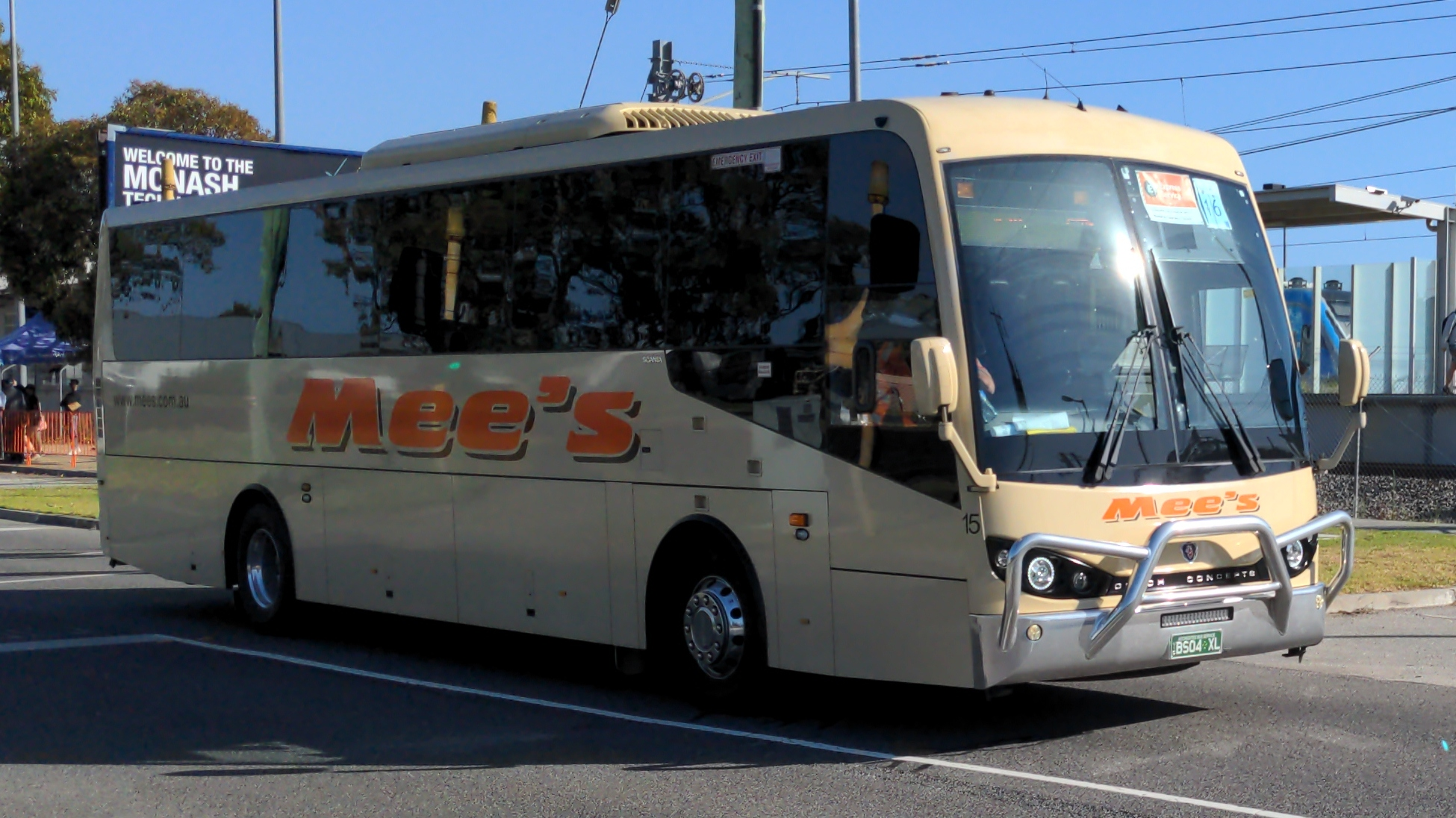
- Scania K310IB at Westall railway station in July 2026
- Parent: Mee family
- Commenced operation: 1941
- Headquarters: Heidelberg Heights
- Service area: Melbourne
- Service type: Bus operator
- Fleet: 116 (December 2023)
- Website: www.mees.com.au

Mee's Bus Lines is a bus and coach operator in Melbourne, Australia.

== History ==
Russell Mee commenced a bodybuilding business in 1941, initially trading under the Mee's Bodyworks banner and later as Melba Busworks. The company built bodies for many operators, including the Australian Army.

In 1965, a route from Canterbury to Box Hill South was purchased from L Drumgold, but it ceased operations in 1967. In June 1972, Mee's began operating routes around Warrandyte, which were sold in 1973 to Hurstbridge Bus & Taxi Service.

The company now operates an extensive school run and charter business, as well as a coach service from Melbourne to Mansfield under a contract with V/Line service.

== Fleet ==
As at December 2024, the fleet consists of 122 buses and coaches. The fleet livery is cream, brown and orange.
