= Warburton railway line =

Warburton

Overview
- Status: Closed line - Lilydale to Warburton Rail Trail
- Owner: Victorian Railways (VR) (1901–1965)
- Locale: Melbourne, Victoria, Australia
- Termini: Lilydale; Warburton (La La Siding)
- Continues from: Lilydale
- Connecting lines: Lilydale line
- Former connections: Healesville line, Powelltown tramway
- Stations: 11 former stations; 2 former sidings

Service
- Type: Former Melbourne suburban service
- Operator: Victorian Railways (VR) (1901–1965)

History
- Work began: 13 November 1901
- Opened: Lilydale to Warburton on 13 November 1901; Warburton to La La Siding on 3 May 1909
- Completed: 3 May 1909
- Closed: Closed on 29 July 1965; Last train on 1 August 1965

Technical
- Line length: 39.768 km (24.711 mi)
- Number of tracks: Single track
- Track gauge: 1,600 mm (5 ft 3 in)

The Warburton railway line just outside Melbourne, Australia, was a railway branching off from the Healesville line at the present terminus, Lilydale.

== History ==
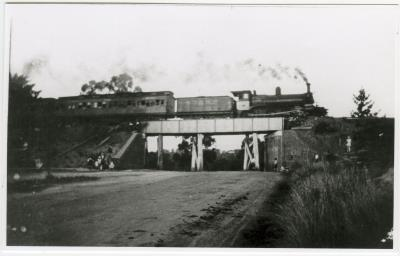
A steam engine and carriages being used to test the new steel bridge over the Maroondah Highway, Lilydale, 1900

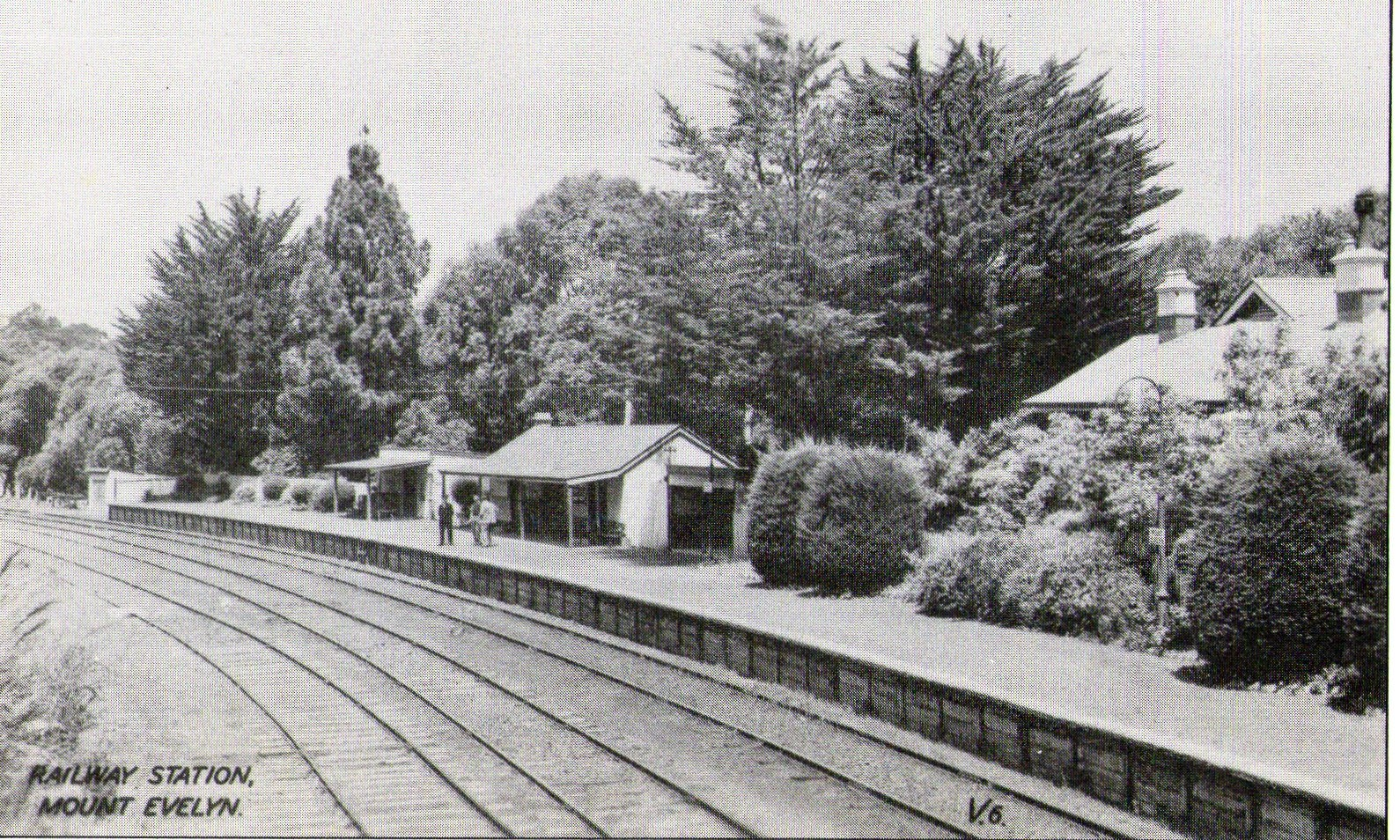
Mt Evelyn railway station ~1920

The route between Lilydale and Warburton was originally proposed to be built as one of four experimental narrow gauge lines, but the recommendation was not accepted and the Warburton line opened as a 5 ft 3 in (1,600 mm) railway on Wednesday, 13 November 1901. The line from Lilydale to Warburton was slightly over 37 kilometres (23 mi) long. The last train ran on Sunday, 1 August 1965, although the official closure was on 29 July 1965.

== Services ==
Throughout its life the Warburton line had both passenger and goods services. Although passenger services generally ran as a shuttle between Lilydale and Warburton stations), some were operated by so-called E trains, which consisted of either two electric swing-door cars (generally known as "dog boxes") or two Tait cars, hauling a number country carriages on services that ran express for most of their journey from Flinders Street station to Ringwood, except for a stop at Box Hill. At Lilydale, the country carriages were detached, and hauled by a steam locomotive to their destination at Warburton, with the reverse arrangement for the return trip.

== Current status ==
Although the track was dismantled in the 1970s, the Warburton line right-of-way is intact, except for a short section leased to Mount Lilydale Mercy College. All the bridges are still in place, except the one that previously crossed the Maroondah Highway. A new bridge, allowing the highway to be safely crossed by cyclists and pedestrians, was completed in 2011. The route formerly used by the line is now the Lilydale to Warburton Rail Trail, a pedestrian, bicycle and equestrian trail.

== Station histories ==
Station	Opened	Closed	Age	Notes
Lilydale	1 December 1882		143 years	
Mount Evelyn	13 November 1901	29 July 1965	63 years	Formerly Olinda Vale; Formerly Evelyn
Wandin	13 November 1901	29 July 1965	63 years	
Seville	13 November 1901	29 July 1965	63 years	
Killara	13 November 1901	29 July 1965	63 years	
Woori Yallock	13 November 1901	29 July 1965	63 years	Formerly Woori Yallock; Formerly Woori
Launching Place	13 November 1901	29 July 1965	63 years	
Yarra Junction	13 November 1901	29 July 1965	63 years	
Britannia	9 September 1902	March 1933	30 years	Formerly Richard's Siding
Wesburn	13 November 1901	15 December 1964	63 years	Formerly West Warburton
Millgrove	13 November 1905	15 December 1964	59 years	
Warburton	13 November 1901	29 July 1965	63 years	
La La Siding	3 May 1909	29 July 1965	56 years	

== See also ==
- Lilydale to Warburton Rail Trail
- The Official website Visit Warburton – Warburton Valley Community and Economic Development Association (CEDA)
- Historical Train Photos of Warburton D3 639; Electric E 1106 – WarburtonInfo.com
