= Lilydale railway station =

Railway station in Lilydale, Melbourne, Victoria, Australia

Lilydale
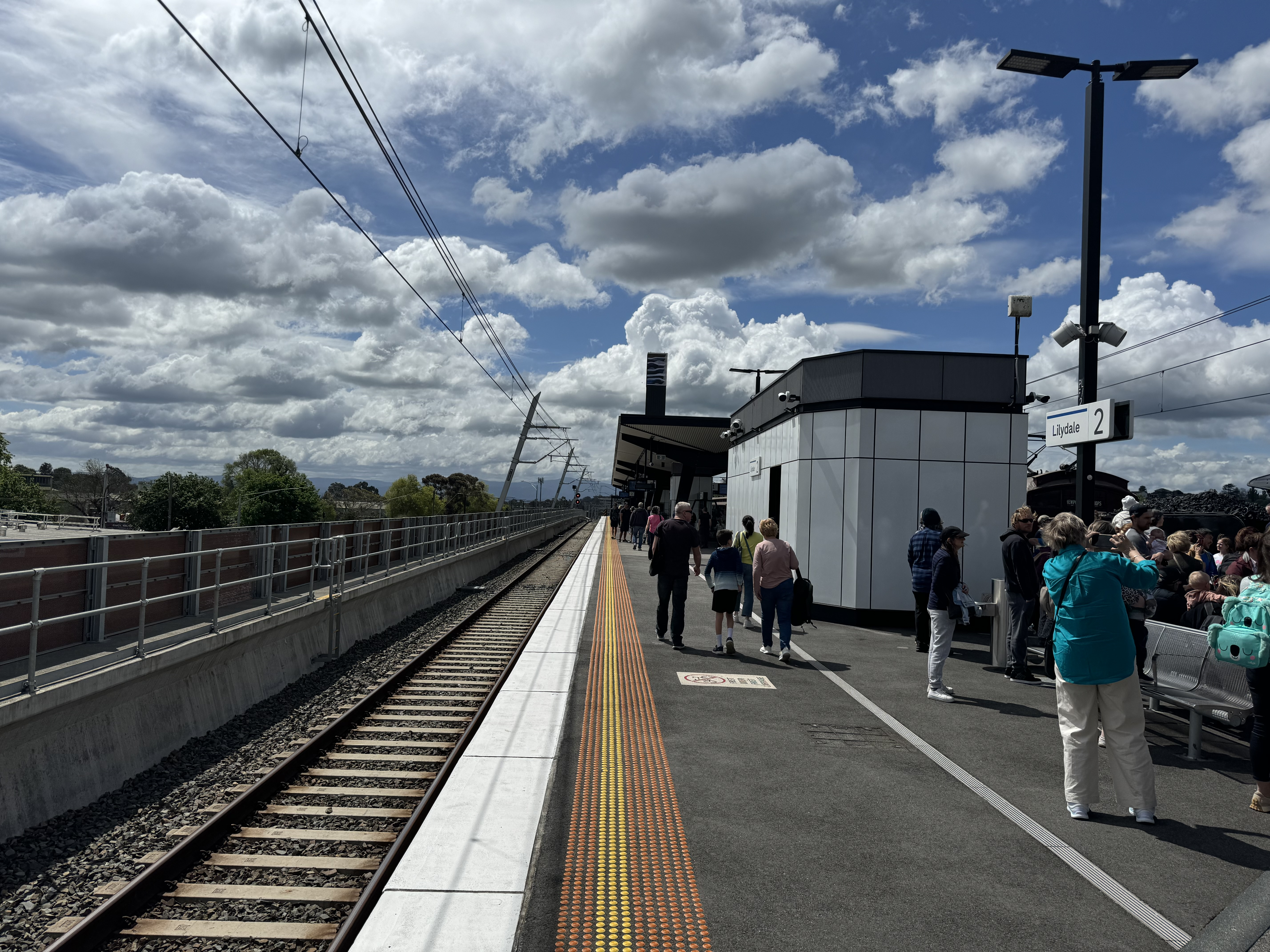
- Northbound view from Platform 2, 2024

General information
- Location: Maroondah Highway, Lilydale, Yarra Ranges, Victoria 3140; Australia
- Coordinates: 37°45′20″S 145°20′51″E
- System: PTV commuter rail station
- Owner: VicTrack
- Operator: Metro Trains
- Line: Lilydale
- Distance: 38.84 kilometres from Southern Cross
- Platforms: 2 (1 island)
- Tracks: 2
- Connections: Bus; Coach

Construction
- Structure type: Elevated
- Parking: 660
- Cycle facilities: 12
- Accessible: Yes—step free access

Other information
- Status: Operational, premium station
- Station code: LIL
- Fare zone: Myki zone 2
- Website: ptv.vic.gov.au/stop/1115

History
- Opened: 1 December 1882; 143 years ago
- Rebuilt: 19 November 2021 (LXRP)
- Electrified: November 1925 (1500 V DC overhead)
- Former names: Lillydale

Passengers
- 2005–2006: 660,900
- 2006–2007: 719,294 ▲8.83%
- 2007–2008: 795,230 ▲10.55%
- 2008–2009: 799,120 ▲0.48%
- 2009–2010: 785,120 ▼1.75%
- 2010–2011: 859,126 ▲9.42%
- 2011–2012: 830,752 ▼3.3%
- 2012–2013: Not measured
- 2013–2014: 673,681 ▼18.9%
- 2014–2015: 661,099 ▼1.86%
- 2015–2016: 714,201 ▲8.03%
- 2016–2017: 638,002 ▼10.66%
- 2017–2018: 683,927 ▲7.19%
- 2018–2019: 701,920 ▲2.63%
- 2019–2020: 556,700 ▼20.68%
- 2020–2021: 244,300 ▼56.11%
- 2021–2022: 236,150 ▼3.33%
- 2022–2023: 390,200 ▲65.23%
- 2023–2024: 410,150 ▲5.11%
- 2024–2025: 512,300 ▲24.91%

Services
Preceding station	Metro Trains	Following station
Mooroolbark towards Flinders Street	Lilydale line	Terminus
Mooroolbark towards Ringwood	Lilydale line Shuttle service	Terminus
Former services
Preceding station	VicRail	Following station
Terminus	Healesville line	Coldstream towards Healesville
Terminus	Warburton line	Mount Evelyn towards Warburton
List of closed railway stations in Melbourne

History
- Built: 1914; 112 years ago
- Closed: 1978

Site notes
- Material: Bricks; timber; pressed metal; glass
- Length: 17 m (55 ft)
- Width: 6.1 m (20 ft)

Victorian Heritage Register
- Official name: Lilydale Railway Station Refreshment Rooms
- Type: Registered place
- Designated: 9 October 2003
- Reference no.: H2044
- Heritage overlay no.: HO399
- Category: Transport - Rail

Register of the National Estate
- Official name: Healesville - Lilydale Railway Line
- Type: Defunct register
- Designated: undated
Track layout
Location

Lilydale station is a railway station operated by Metro Trains Melbourne and the terminus of the Lilydale line, part of the Melbourne rail network. It serves the north-eastern Melbourne suburb of Lilydale in Victoria, Australia. Lilydale is an elevated premium station, featuring an island platform with two faces. It opened on 1 December 1882, with the current terminus station and stabling provided in November 2021.

Initially opened as Lillydale, spelling that matched the original township, the station was given its current name of Lilydale on the 15 May 1888.

Built on the traditional lands of the Wurundjeri people, various elements of the railway station complex and the railway line were added to the Victorian Heritage Register on 9 October 2003 in recognition of its historical significance; and, on an unknown dates, were also added to non-statutory lists by the Victorian branch of the National Trust, the now defunct Register of the National Estate, and to other non-statutory lists.

== History ==
Lilydale station opened on 1 December 1882 as an extension of the railway line from Camberwell, which had been extended from Hawthorn in April of that year. The fare from Melbourne was 3s 6d (first class) and 2s 6d (second class), and a letter-writer to The Age, "Cyclops", claimed that with the fare from Melbourne to Box Hill being only 9d (first class), there would soon be a line of stage coaches waiting to take people to Lillydale, with the extra cost effectively being a check on the growth of the town.

The second station building, opening in 1888, was relocated to Yarra Junction in 1915, having been replaced by the current building. When the new elevated station was constructed during level crossing elimination works between 2020–2022, the old ground-level building was retained and its former refreshment rooms were added to the Victorian Heritage Register.

Until it was truncated at Lilydale in 1980, the line continued to Healesville. The line between Yarra Glen and Healesville is now part of the Yarra Valley Railway. The track from Lilydale to Yarra Glen, including Coldstream and Yering, was repurposed as a rail trail. The Yarra Valley Railway leased the entire line, but they discontinued their lease on the section from Lilydale to Yarra Glen because of the bad condition of the timber bridges in that section. On 10 December 1991, the line between Lilydale and Coldstream was officially booked out of service.

The Warburton line also branched off at Lilydale. The line opened in 1901 and closed on 1 August 1965. The track was removed in the early 1970s, as was the bridge over the Maroondah Highway. Most of the right-of-way is still intact, and was turned into the Lilydale to Warburton Rail Trail. The exception is the part of the line approximately 800 metres (2,600 ft) beyond where it branched off at Lilydale. Mount Lilydale Mercy College leased that part of the railway reserve, which ran through its property, being the only part of the former line that is obstructed.

Until 1967, a turntable also existed at the station.

In 1985, boom barriers replaced hand gates at the former Maroondah Highway level crossing, which was located at the up end of the station. Around the same time, the platform numbers were swapped over. Occurring in that year, a signal panel was provided at the station, which controlled Lilydale and Mooroolbark. It was abolished in September 2021, with control transferred to Ringwood.

On 29 November 1991, a Hitachi train set rolled away from the stabling yard for about 1.5 kilometres (0.93 mi) towards Coldstream. It crashed through a wire fence and traversed the Beresford and Nelson Roads level crossings, and was about to climb a hill when it rolled back 300 metres (980 ft). Police advised that only one of the four brakes on the train was engaged. A train driver was suspended due to the incident.

On 31 July 1996, Lilydale was upgraded to a premium station.

=== Refreshments rooms ===
The Lilydale railway station refreshment room was opened in 1914 as part of the new railway station building. The station was a busy tourist interchange, and a large part of its trade was the day-tripper tourist crowd travelling on to Healesville, and to Warburton, the line for which branched off at Lilydale. The rooms were privately operated until 1919, when Victorian Railways took over the operation. Between 1932 and 1939 only light refreshments were served because of the depression and a downturn in passenger numbers. The rooms included a large cellar, separate bar, and the main refreshment room measuring 16.8 by 6.1 metres (55 by 20 ft), with pressed metal dados and platform serving window. Although the counters are now gone, still surviving along one side of the room are the original glass-fronted cabinets installed when the rooms were built. The rooms were operated by a staff of six or seven and adjoining rooms included kitchen, scullery, toilets and living quarters for the manager. The rooms were finally closed in 1978.

=== Level Crossing Removal Project ===
In 2015 it was announced, as part of the Level Crossing Removal Project, that the grade separation of the crossing at Maroondah Highway was planned. In 2019, the designs were revealed. In 2020, work commenced on the project and, in late 2021, the level crossing was removed. The chosen method was to raise the railway line above the former level crossing. As part of the plans, the ground-level station building remained where it was and would beaded to the Victorian Heritage Register. The rail bridge on John Street was demolished, and the land between it and the level crossing became an activity zone located underneath the new station. On 19 November 2021, the rebuilt station opened.

== Platforms and services ==
Lilydale has one island platform with two faces. It is served by Lilydale line trains.

Lilydale platform arrangement
Platform	Line	Destination	Via	Service Type	Notes	Source
1	Lilydale line	Ringwood, Flinders Street	City Loop	All stations and limited express services	See City Loop for operating patterns	
2	Lilydale line	Ringwood, Flinders Street	City Loop	All stations and limited express services	See City Loop for operating patterns	

== Transport links ==
Martyrs Bus Service operates one route via Lilydale station, under contract to Public Transport Victoria:

- 683 : Chirnside Park Shopping Centre – Warburton

McKenzie's Tourist Services operates three bus routes via Lilydale station, under contract to Public Transport Victoria:

- 684 : Ringwood station – Eildon
- 685 : to Healesville Sanctuary
- Night Bus 965 : to Lilydale station (loop service via Yarra Glen, Healesville and Woori Yallock) (Saturday and Sunday mornings only)

Ventura Bus Lines operates six routes via Lilydale station, under contract to Public Transport Victoria:

- 663 : to Belgrave station
- 670 : Ringwood station – Box Hill Institute Lilydale Lakeside Campus
- 677 : to Chirnside Park Shopping Centre
- 679 : Chirnside Park Shopping Centre – Ringwood station
- 680 : to Mooroolbark station
- FlexiRide Lilydale

Mee's Bus Lines operates a V/Line coach service from Mansfield to Melbourne via Lilydale station.

== Gallery ==
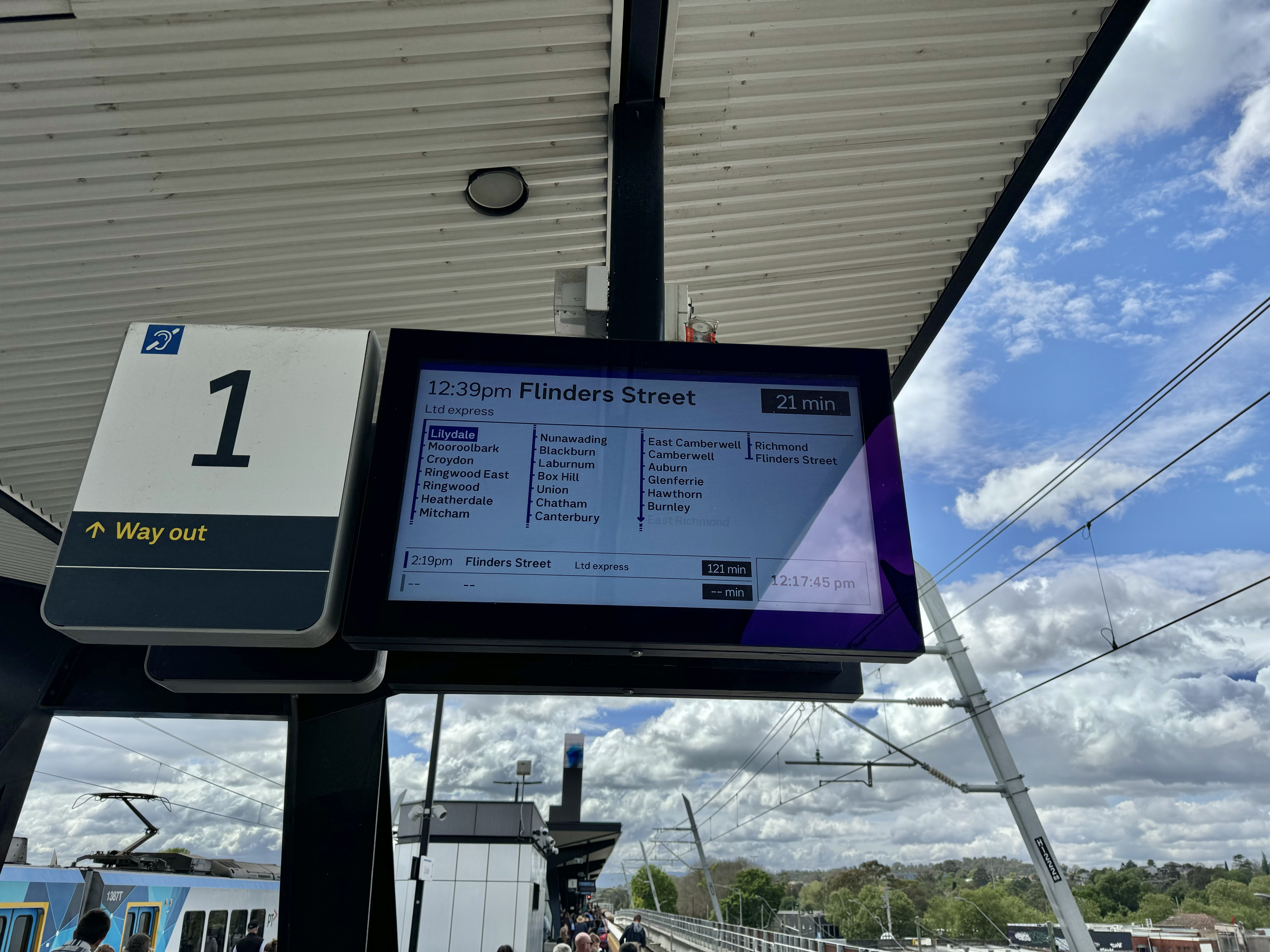
A PID on Platform 1 displaying a Flinders Street-bound service, 2024

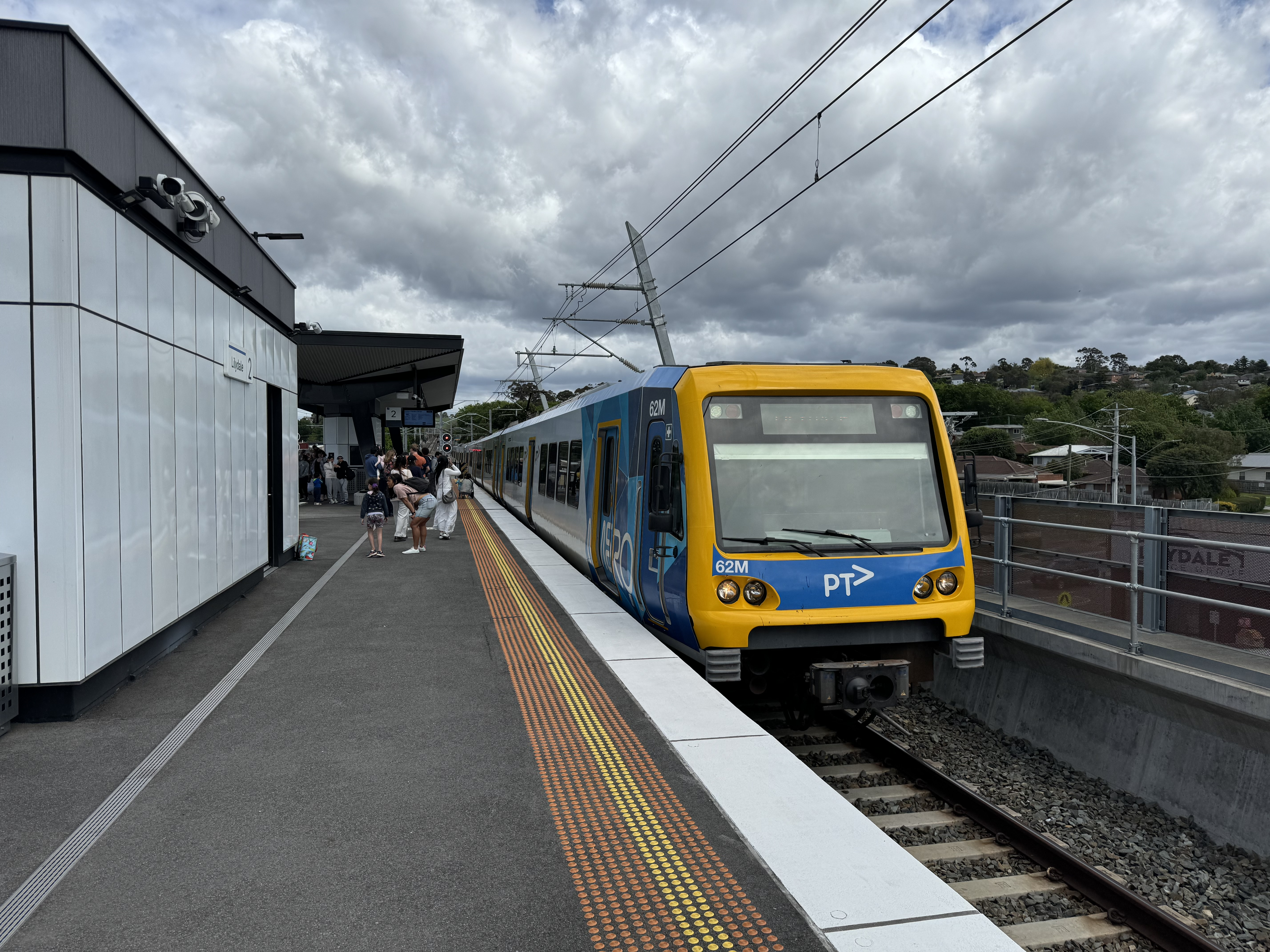
An X'Trapolis train terminating at Platform 2, 2024

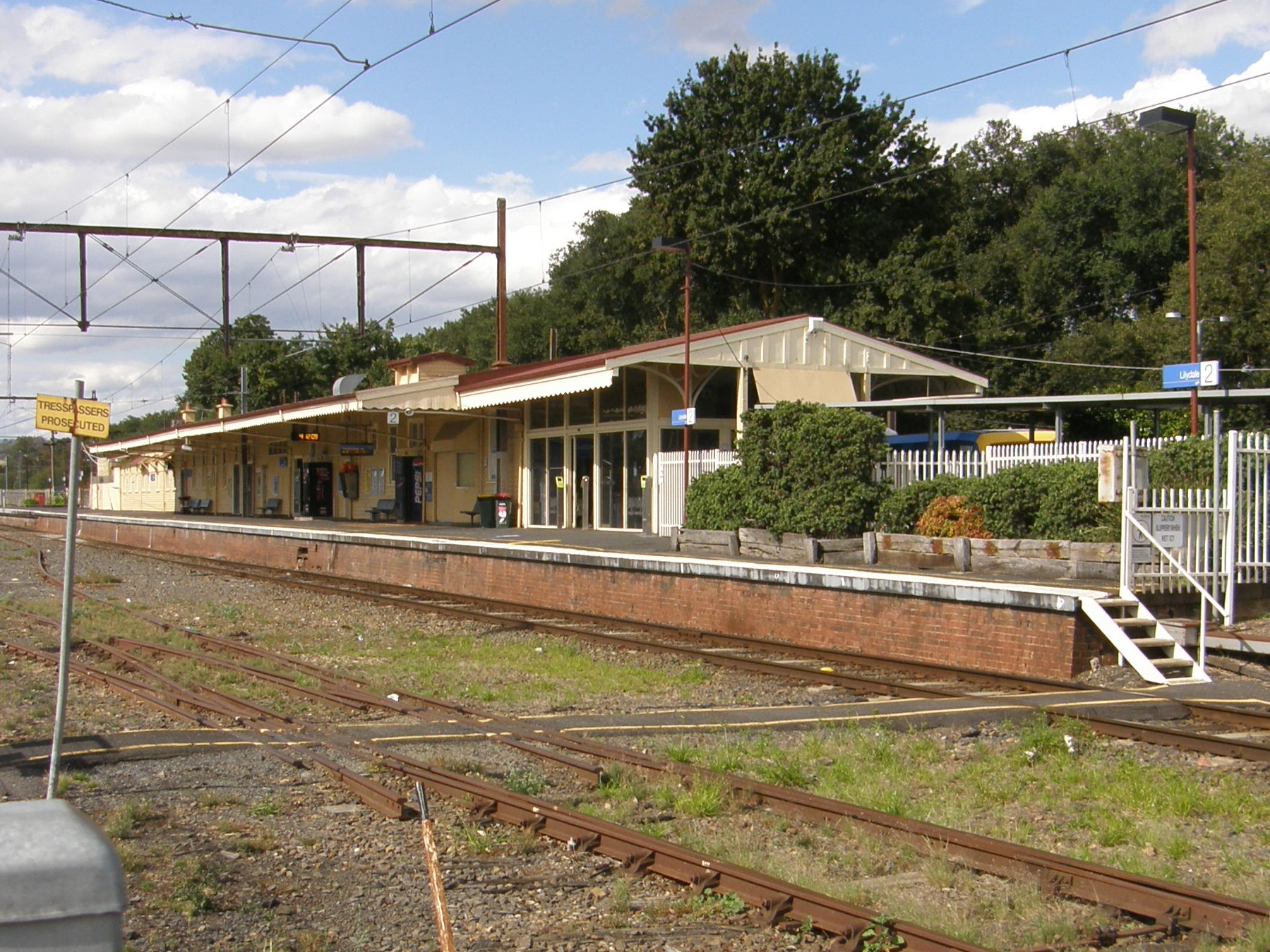
Northbound view of the former ground level Platform 2, 2015

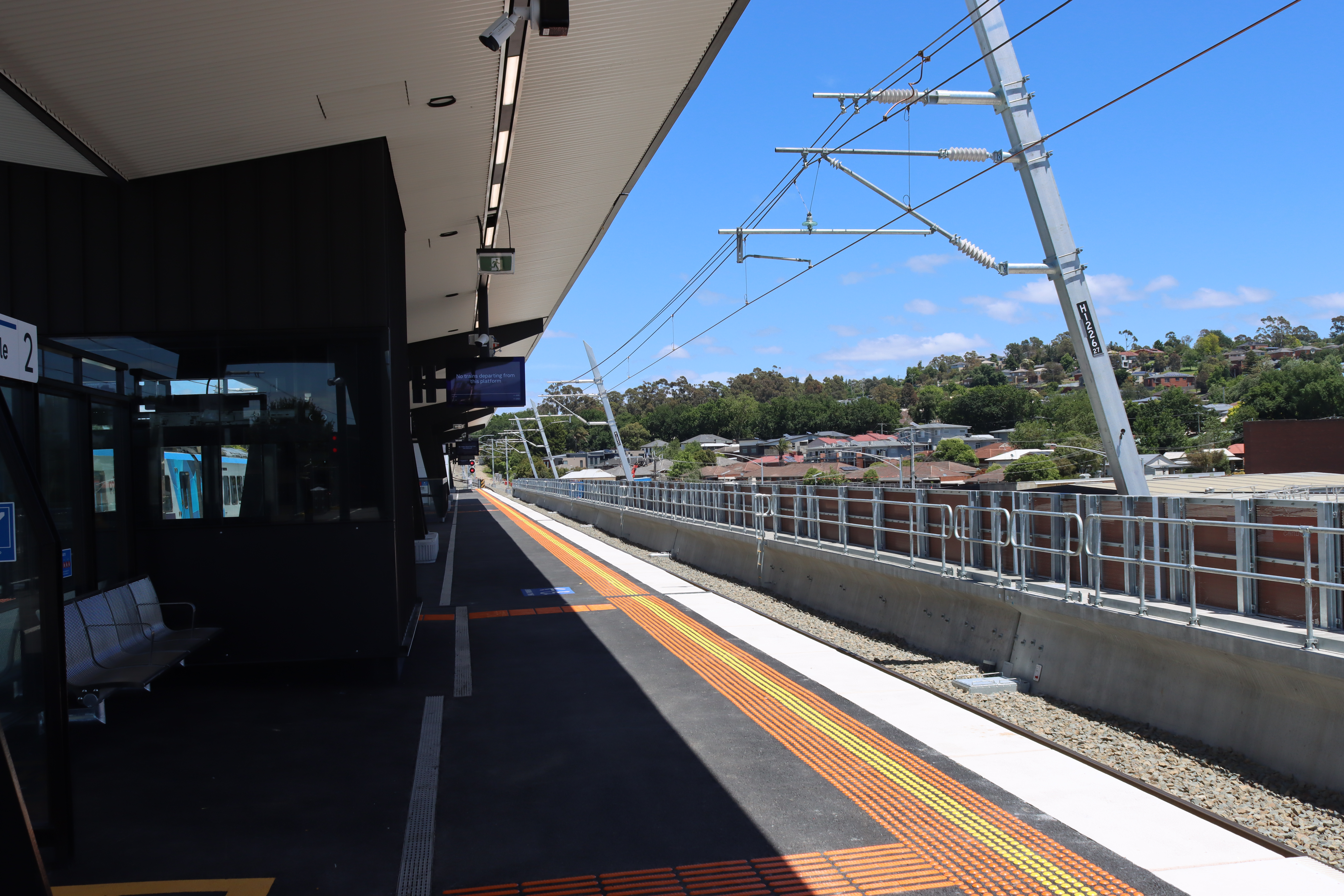
Southbound view from Platform 2, 2021

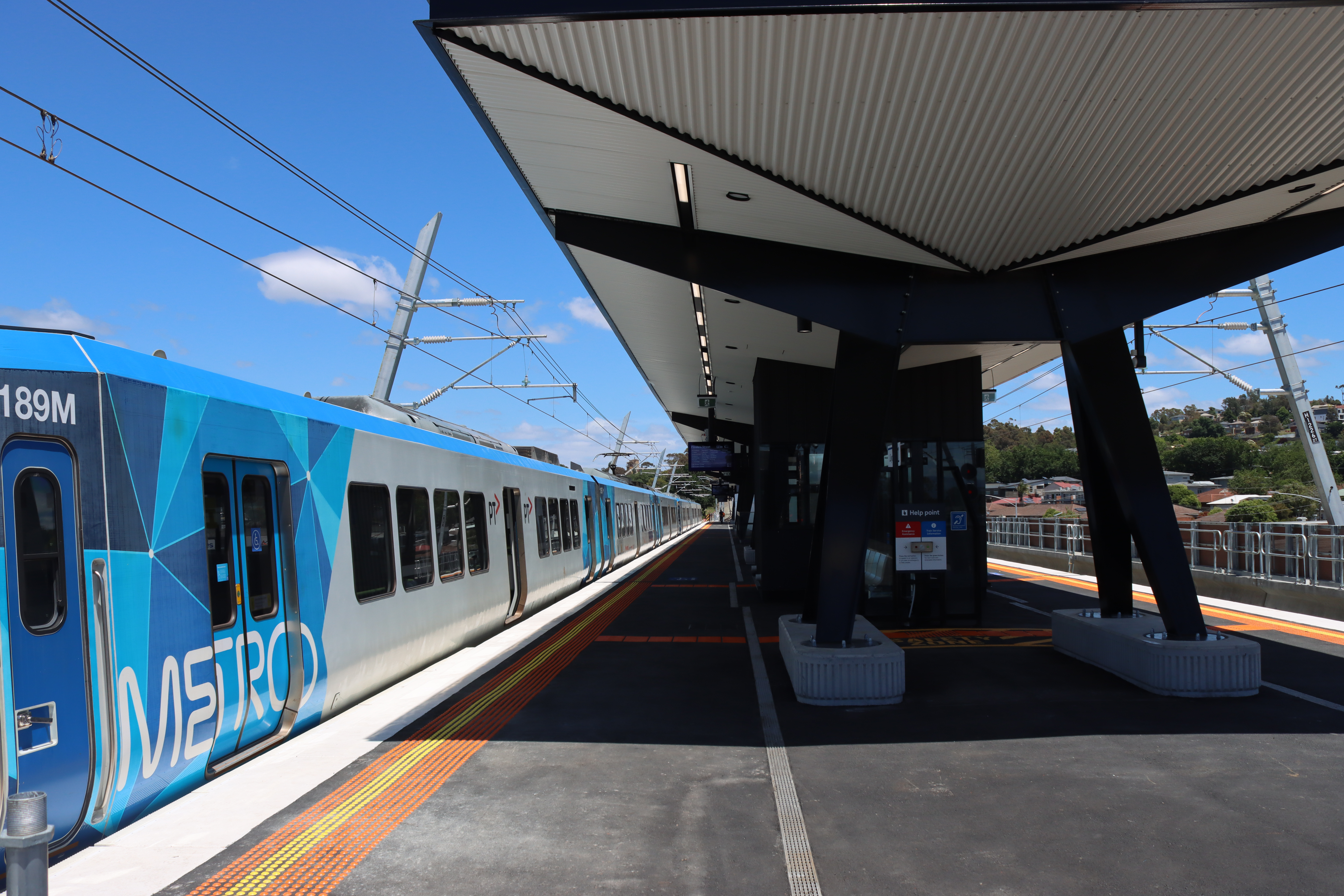
Southbound view from Platform 1, with an X'Trapolis train at the platform, 2021

== See also ==
- List of railway stations in Melbourne
- List of places on the Victorian Heritage Register in the Shire of Yarra Ranges
