= Warburton railway station =

Closed railway station in Warburton, Melbourne, Victoria, Australia

Warburton
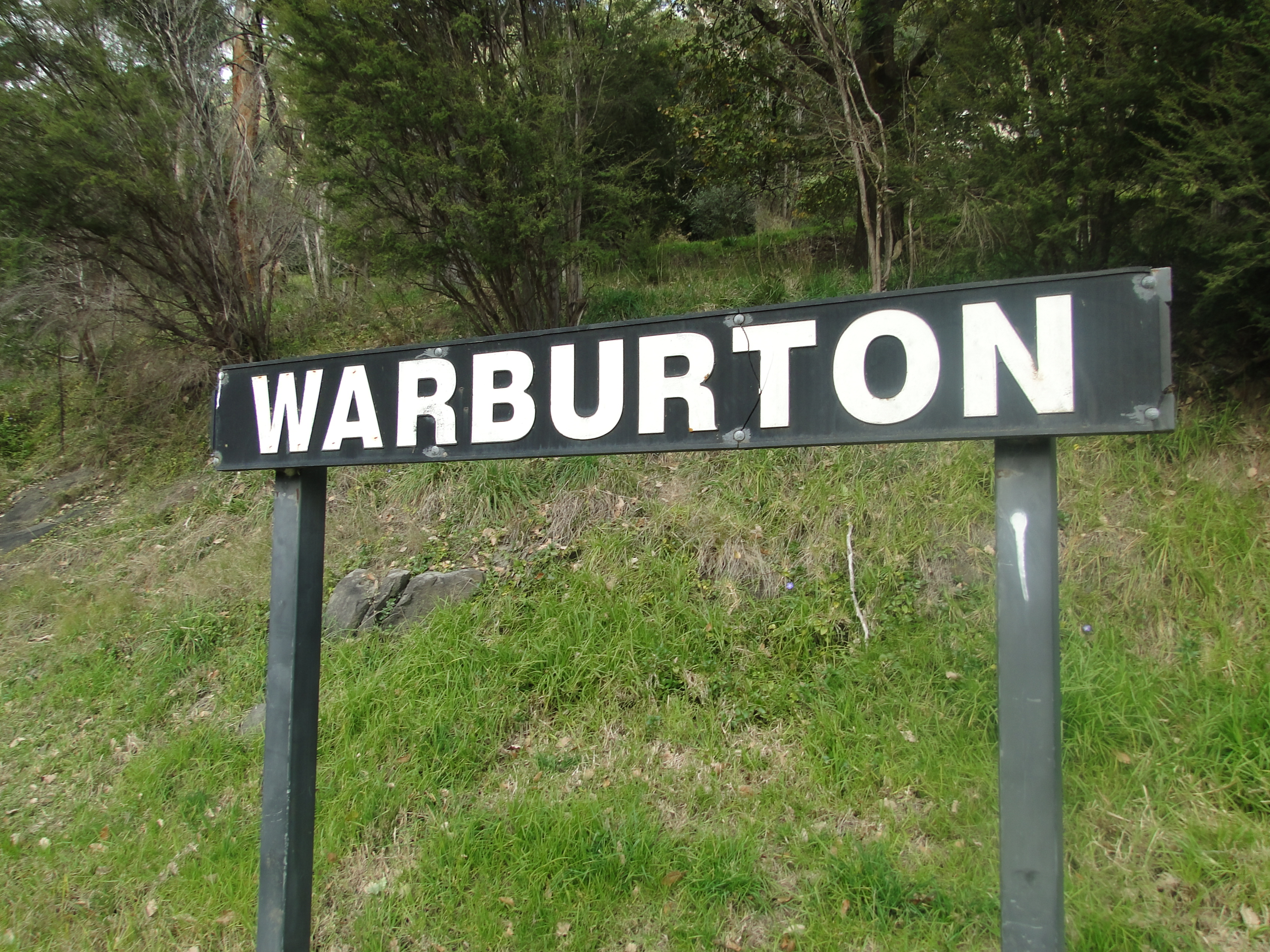

General information
- Coordinates: 37°45′15″S 145°41′23″E
- Line: Warburton
- Platforms: 1
- Tracks: 3

Other information
- Status: Closed

History
- Opened: 13 November 1901
- Closed: 1 August 1965

Services
Preceding station	VicRail	Following station
Millgrove towards Lilydale	Warburton line	Terminus
List of closed railway stations in Melbourne
Location

Warburton railway station is a former railway station in Warburton, Victoria, located in the upper reaches of the Yarra Valley, 72 kilometres east of Melbourne. The station opened on 13 November 1901 as the terminus of the Warburton railway line, and operated until the closure of the line on 1 August 1965. The site is now at one end of the Lilydale to Warburton Rail Trail, which follows the route of the former railway.

On 3 May 1909, to provide better facilities for the loading of timber from the numerous mills in the area, the track was extended to La La Siding, a short distance beyond Warburton station. The extension closed with the line in 1965.

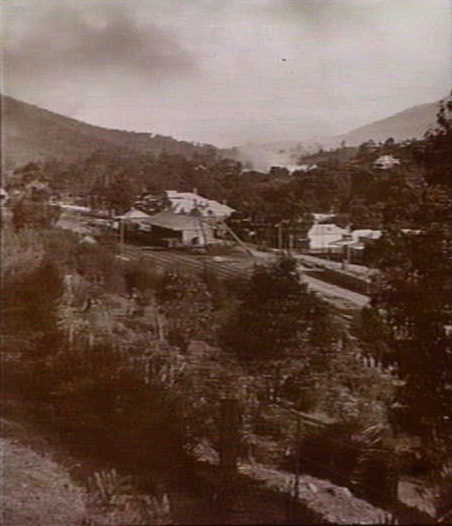
View towards Warburton station in 1920
