= Coldstream railway station, Melbourne =

Former railway station in Melbourne, Victoria, Australia

Coldstream
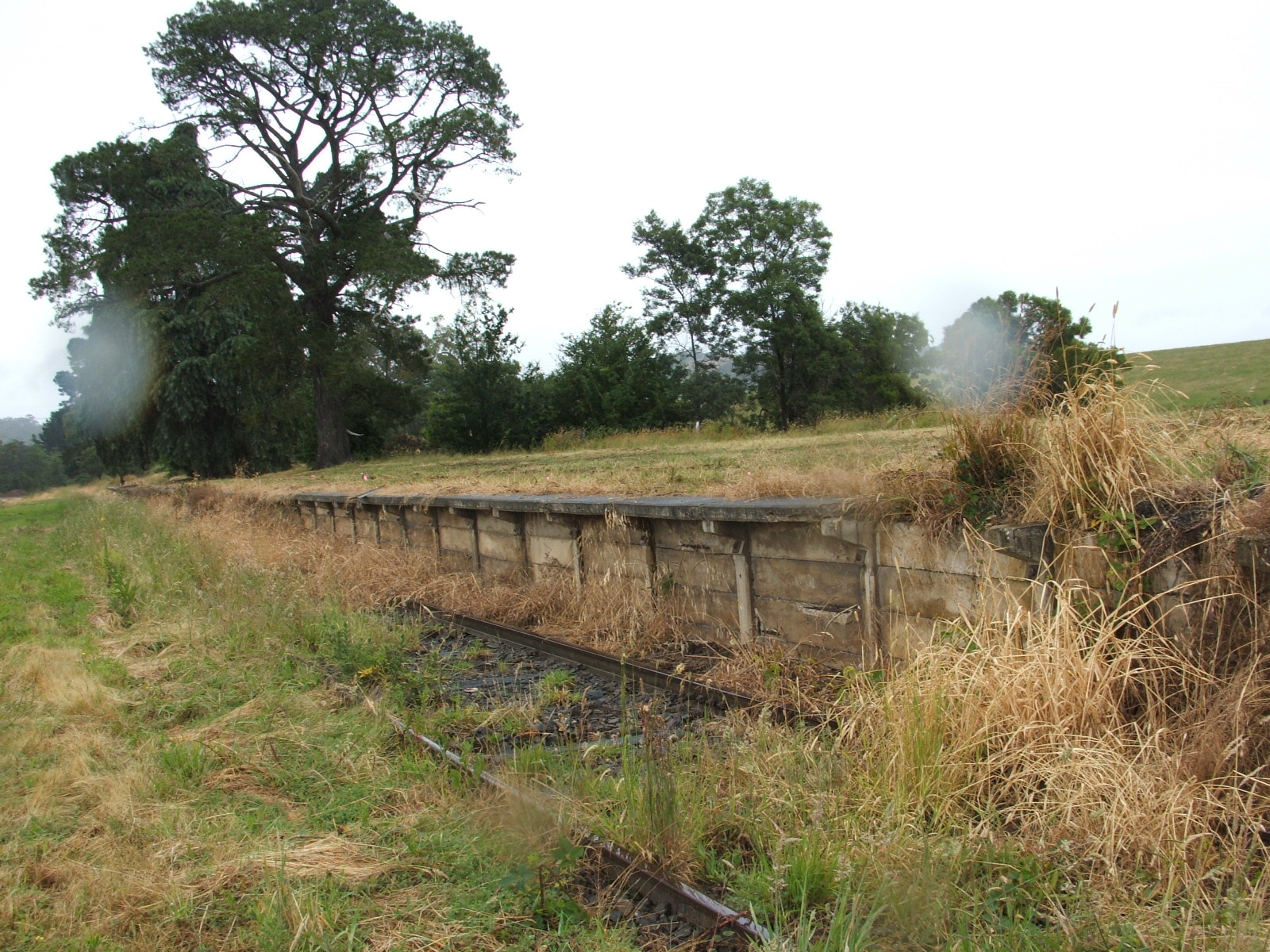
- Remains of the platform in December 2004

General information
- Coordinates: 37°43′36″S 145°22′21″E
- Line: Healesville
- Platforms: 1
- Tracks: 2

Other information
- Status: Closed

History
- Opened: 15 May 1888
- Closed: 1992
- Former names: Black's (May 1888)

Services
Preceding station	VicRail	Following station
Lilydale Terminus	Healesville line	Yering towards Healesville
List of closed railway stations in Melbourne
Location

Coldstream is a closed railway station, located on Station Street, Coldstream, Victoria, Australia, on the now-closed Healesville line.

== History ==
Coldstream railway station was opened in May 1888, and was originally named Black's after Robert Black, who owned a large amount of land in the area. Before the end of the month, it was renamed to Coldstream.

The station buildings were destroyed by fire in the late 1990s. The track from Coldstream to Yarra Glen was formerly leased by the Yarra Valley Tourist Railway, who discontinued their lease due to the poor condition of bridges along the line. An old platform in poor condition remains at the former station.

Until 1992, freight trains ran to Coldstream to service the fertilizer factory adjacent to the former station.

In 2019, the Daylesford Spa Country Railway removed the turnouts from Coldstream for use at Bullarto by the railway.

As of January 2020, Coldstream station has become part of the Yarra Valley rail trail and the platform has been restored.
