= Tarrawarra =

- Town
- Coordinates: 37.657°S 145.424°E
- Country: Australia
- State: Victoria
- LGA: Shire of Yarra Ranges
- Location: 45 km (28 mi) from Melbourne
- Established: 1893

Government
  - State electorate: Eildon
  - Federal division: McEwen

Population
  - Total: 81 (2021 census)
- Postcode: 3775
Localities around Tarrawarra
Yarra Glen	Dixons Creek	Healesville
Yarra Glen	Tarrawarra	Healesville
Yering	Coldstream	Coldstream

Tarrawarra is a locality in Victoria, Australia, 45 km north-east of Melbourne's central business district, located within the Shire of Yarra Ranges local government area. Tarrawarra recorded a population of 81 at the 2021 census.

It was originally known as View Hill estate, and was purchased in 1893 by David Syme, owner and publisher of The Age newspaper, who expanded it and gave it its present name, which is of Aboriginal origin. The name refers to "slow waters", describing the local arc in the Yarra River. The Post Office opened on 4 June 1900 and closed in 1957.

Tarrawarra railway station opened with the opening of the Healesville line on 1 March 1889 and closed with the line on 9 December 1980. The station is now under the control of the Yarra Valley Railway who are working towards reopening the line from Healesville through Tarrawarra to Yarra Glen.

In 1954 Cistercian Monks from Ireland purchased one section of the property comprising 1,000 acres (4.0 km^{2}), including the large house built by David Syme for his daughter and established Tarrawarra Abbey of the Order of Cistercians of the Strict Observance (Trappists). Since that time the community has built additional buildings including a large library in 2006. The monks support themselves by operating a beef farm and by Tarrawarra Eucharistic Breads.

Another section of the original estate today is TarraWarra Estate winery, which opened in 1983 and which produces chardonnay and pinot noir, and the TarraWarra Museum of Art, which opened in 2000.
