= List of places on the Victorian Heritage Register in the Shire of Yarra Ranges =

This is a list of places on the Victorian Heritage Register in the Shire of Yarra Ranges in Victoria, Australia. The Victorian Heritage Register is maintained by the Heritage Council of Victoria.

The Victorian Heritage Register, as of 2026, listed the following 26 state-registered places within the Shire of Yarra Ranges:

Place name	Place #	Location	Suburb or Town	Co-ordinates	Built	State registered	Photo
Bickleigh Vale	H2053	Residential estate	Mooroolbark	37°47′27″S 145°19′50″E	1920s	25 March 2004	
Burnham Beeches and the Alfred Nicholas Memorial Gardens	H0868	1 Sherbrooke Rd	Sherbrooke	37°52′30″S 145°21′21″E	1930	27 March 1991	
Camp Eureka	H1981	90–100 Tarrango Rd	Yarra Junction	37°47′23″S 145°38′23″E	1946	21 March 2002	
Cave Hill Limestone Quarry	H2366	4 Melba Ave	Lilydale	37°46′03″S 145°20′20″E	1878	8 June 2017	
Cement Creek Plantation	H2439	Cement Creek Rd	East Warburton	37°43′11″S 145°45′09″E	1929	20 April 2023	
Chateau Yering	H1139	38–42 Melba Hwy	Coldstream	37°40′31″S 145°22′58″E	1854	7 December 1995	
Coombe Cottage	H2443	673–675 Maroondah Hwy	Coldstream	37°43′09″S 145°22′52″E	1912	10 August 2023	
Old Federal Mill	H1822	Big Creek Rd	McMahons Creek	37°48′14″S 145°52′53″E	1922	17 June 1999	
Gulf Station and Prefabricated timber house	H0384; H2024	1029 Melba Highway	Yarra Glen	37°38′50″S 145°23′05″E	1854; 1870s	12 May 1976; 13 February 2003	
Healesville Court House (former)	H1171	42 Harker St	Healesville	37°39′22″S 145°30′38″E	1890	18 April 1996	
Healesville railway station complex	H1567	38 Healesville-Kinglake Rd	Healesville	37°39′23″S 145°30′36″E	1902	20 August 1982	
Horatio Jones House	H0957	14–16 Blackwood St	Tecoma	37°53′55″S 145°20′35″E	1926	25 March 1993	
Kurth Kiln (Note: Also listed on the VHR in the Shire of Cardinia.)	H2012	Soldiers Rd	Gembrook	37°53′57″S 145°34′32″E	1940	20 March 2003	
Lilydale railway station refreshment rooms	H2044	99 Main St	Lilydale	37°45′20″S 145°20′52″E	1914	9 October 2003	
Longacres, Olinda	H1876	15 Range Rd	Olinda	37°51′27″S 145°21′44″E	1924	26 October 2000	
Mackenzie Cottage, Healesville Sanctuary	H1767	25 Badger Creek Rd	Badger Creek	37°41′02″S 145°32′02″E	1920	7 January 1999	
Mawarra	H2300	6 Sherbrooke Rd	Sherbrooke	37°52′56″S 145°21′44″E	1925	10 May 2012	
Maroondah Water Supply System (Note: Also listed on the VHR in the local government areas of Nillumbik, Whittlesea, and the City of Darebin.) (upper and central sections)	H2381	various	Healesville	multiple	1891	24 May 2018	
Monbulk Creek Rail Bridge	H1439	Belgrave-Gembrook Rd	Belgrave / Selby	37°54′30″S 145°21′55″E	1899	20 August 1982	
Myrtle Creek Bridge	H1855	Don Rd	Don Valley	37°42′52″S 145°35′49″E	1930	18 November 1999	
Puffing Billy Railway rolling stock	H2187	1 Old Monbulk Rd	Belgrave	37°54′27″S 145°21′24″E	1900	undated	
Richards and Sons Logging Winch Site	H1739	Road 15	McMahons Creek	37°47′48″S 145°54′13″E	1936	20 August 1982	
Sanitarium Health Food and Signs Publishing Company buildings	H0619	51 Main St	Warburton	37°45′09″S 145°41′57″E	1936	19 February 1986	
The Towers	H0612	6–10 The Eyrie	Lilydale	37°45′19″S 145°21′27″E	1876	11 December 1985	
Yeringberg	H0694	810–812 Maroondah Hwy	Yering	37°41′24″S 145°26′04″E	1885	24 August 1988	
