= Railway tunnels in Victoria =

The Australian state of Victoria has tunnels on its railway network and on private narrow gauge tramways.

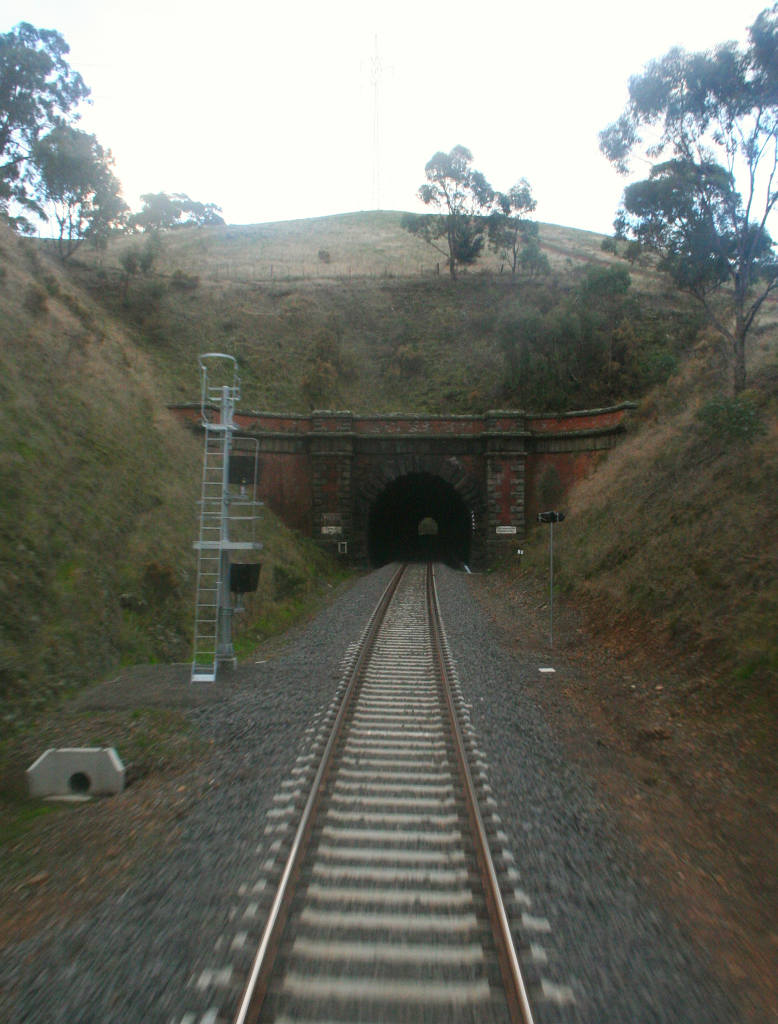
The portal of the Big Hill railway tunnel, 390 metres long, originally double-tracked

== Main line tunnels ==
=== Deniliquin line tunnels ===
The Deniliquin line was commenced by the private Melbourne, Mount Alexander & Murray River Railway Company, but when the company experienced financial difficulties it was taken over by the Victorian colonial government in 1856, with the Victorian Railways Department being formed to operate the new public railway system. The line opened in five stages from February 1859 to September 1864, and was at the time the largest engineering undertaking in the colony. More than 6,000 men were involved in construction of the Deniliquin line with the main contractors Cornish & Bruce undertaking the works. The line served a strategic economic need of serving the important goldfields of Castlemaine and Bendigo (then called Sandhurst), and capturing for Melbourne the trade in wool and other goods from northern Victoria and the Riverina which were formerly shipped through South Australia via the Murray River. Two tunnels were built on the line. The Elphinstone Tunnel, 385 metres (1,263 ft) long, was built in brick and bluestone as a double-track horseshoe profile tunnel, and was completed in 1860. The 390-metre-long (1,280 ft) Big Hill Tunnel, located between Kangaroo Flat and Ravenswood, south of Bendigo. Like the Elpinstone Tunnel, it was double-tracked when built, but was singled as part of the Regional Fast Rail project.

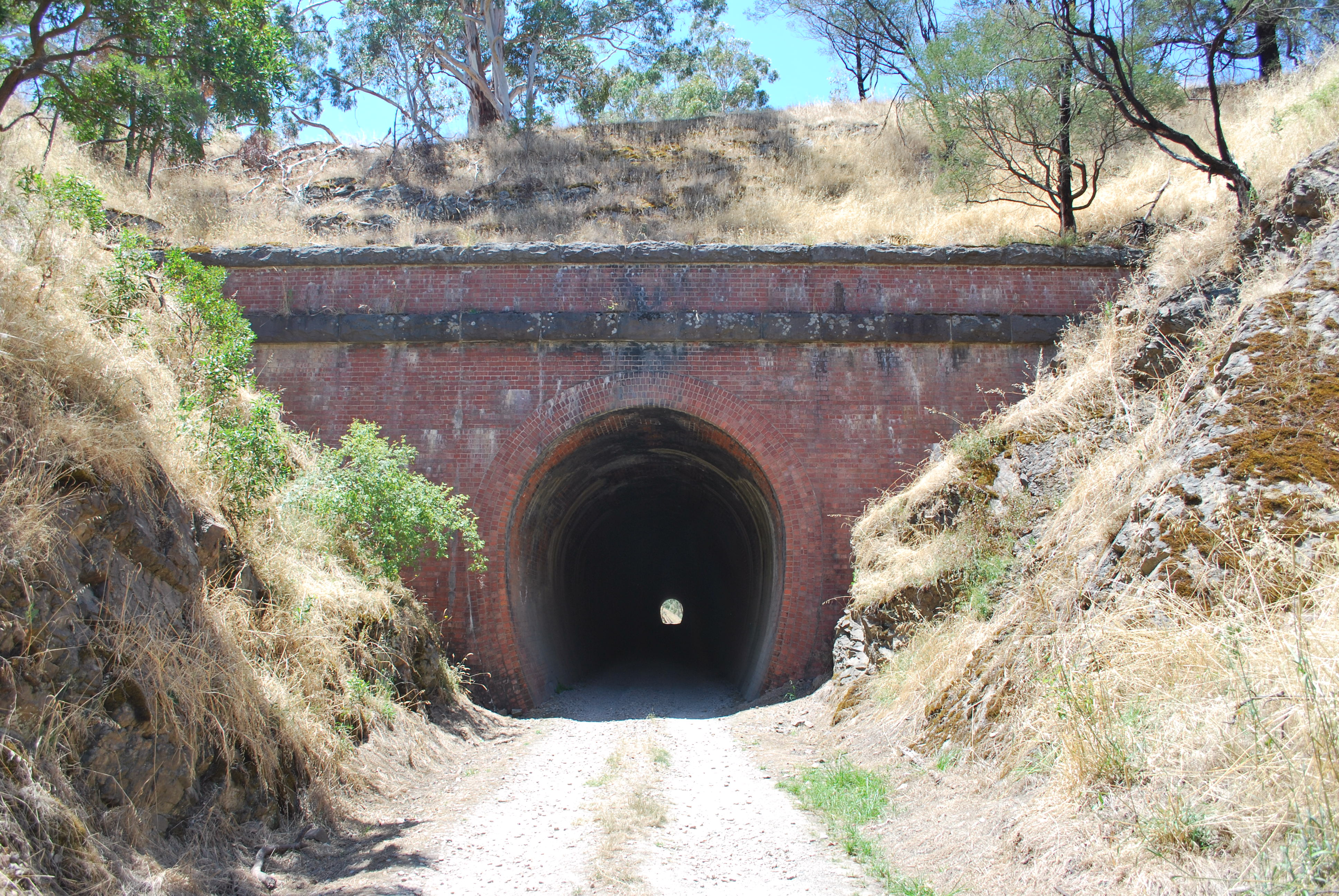
Cheviot railway tunnel

=== Cheviot Tunnel ===
Cheviot tunnel was built for the extension of the Mansfield line from Yea and is located near Limestone, roughly halfway between Yea and Molesworth, where the line crosses the Black Range at McLoughlin's Gap. It was built in 1889, at a cost of £88,661/2/11, by contractors Kenny Bros as part of the Yea to Cathkin section, but construction was delayed by accidents.

=== Tarrawarra Tunnel ===
Tarrawarra Tunnel was built on the Healesville line, when the Lilydale-Melbourne railway was extended from Yarra Flats (now known as Yarra Glen) to Healesville. A 1 in 40 (2.5%) climb up to the 154.4-metre tunnel and a corresponding descent was required. The section of line through the tunnel opened on 1 March 1889.

=== South Geelong Tunnel ===
South Geelong tunnel was built as part of the extension of the Geelong line towards Colac and runs for a distance of 422 metres underneath the edge of the town centre, between McKillop and Ryrie Streets. Construction was commenced on 15 October 1874 by contractors Overend and Robb. It has a typical horseshoe shape and is built of bluestone and brick. The first train ran through the tunnel on 13 January 1876 and official services commenced on 4 February the same year. Its steep grade limited haulage loads and sometimes required assistance from a bank engine.

== Branch line tunnels ==
=== Geelong Harbour Tunnel ===
The Geelong Harbour branch line ran from near the station to Cunningham Pier (originally Railway Pier), being constructed by 1859 to assist in the transfer of goods from the port. A tunnel was constructed just south of the station, running under the main Melbourne Road (Mercer Street) and with a steep-sided bluestone embanked cutting. The line was closed in the 1980s.

=== Portland Harbour Tunnel ===
The similar Portland harbour tunnel was constructed in 1877 in Portland to link the main harbour with the railway, running under Bentink Street and emerging at the base of the shoreline cliffs. This line was later closed and a loop line constructed around the town to the new breakwater harbour.

== Metropolitan lines ==
=== Hurstbridge Line tunnels ===
The Hurstbridge Line tunnels are three tunnels on the suburban Hurstbridge line. Two were built in 1901-2 when the direct line from East Melbourne to Victoria Park was constructed. They are located at Jolimont and West Richmond; the first under Wellington Parade, and the second under Hoddle Street, with a short section of open cutting between them. The third tunnel, which opened in 1902, was part of the extension of the line from Heidelberg to Eltham (and later to Hurstbridge). In 2018, the line between Heidelberg and Rosanna was duplicated, with a second tunnel bored adjacent to the original tunnel.

=== Bunbury Street Tunnel ===
The Bunbury Street tunnel in Footscray, on the Independent Goods Line runs under Bunbury Street (where it was constructed by cut and fill, but included a section of concrete arch and another with a concrete beam roof), passing under the Williamstown platforms of Footscray station. The line was built in 1924 to alleviate congestion caused by country goods trains on the suburban network.

=== City Loop ===
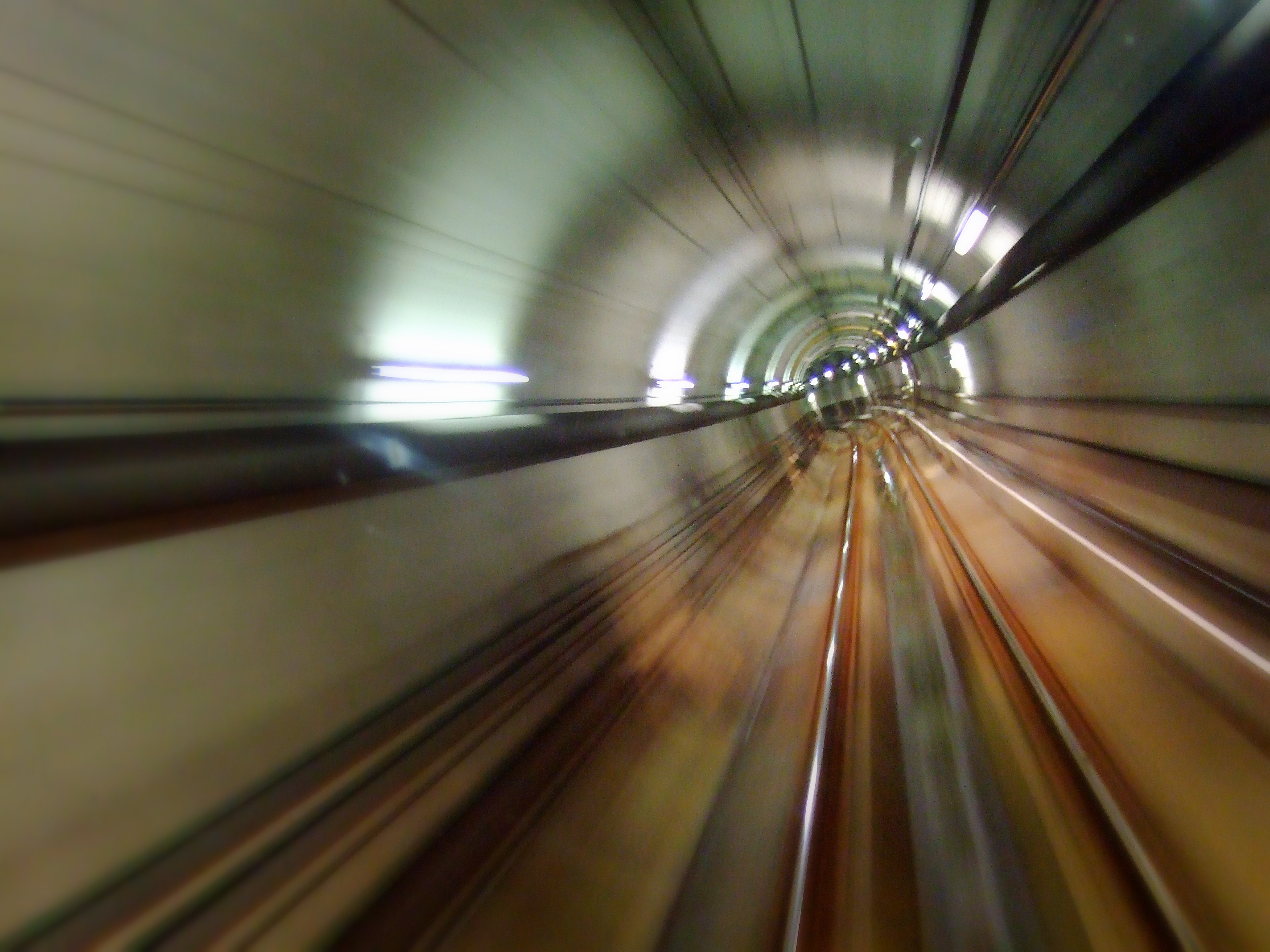
Inside a section of bored tunnel

The City Loop was constructed as four separate tunnels. One tunnel between North Melbourne and Flinders Street, another tunnel between Jolimont and Southern Cross, and two tunnels between Richmond and Southern Cross.

The tunnels roughly follow the alignment of Spring Street and La Trobe Street with underground stations at Parliament, Melbourne Central and Flagstaff. The tunnels and stations were constructed between 1971 and 1985.

=== Metro Tunnel ===
The Metro Tunnel runs for 9 kilometres (5.6 mi) under Melbourne's CBD, connecting the Cranbourne and Pakenham lines with the Sunbury line. It consists of two parallel bored tunnels.

== Narrow-gauge tunnels ==
=== The Bump Tunnel ===
The Bump tunnel was built on a narrow-gauge tramline near Powelltown, to gain access to timber for the sawmills of the district. The Powelltown Tramway ran from Yarra Junction to Powelltown between 1913 and 1945, and formed the collector for numerous timber tramways. One was the Bump Line, which was built in about 1913 with a steep section across the range at the head of the Little Yarra River, using a steam winch-hauled incline. This was replaced in July 1925 to with a 313 metre long tunnel which was about 2.8 m wide and 4.0 m high and took 13 months to dig. It was timber-lined and had a vent shaft in the middle through which smoke escaped. The tunnel was closed as a safety measure after World War II. Both entrances are still visible.

=== Geelong Cement Works Tunnel ===
The narrow-gauge Fyansford Cement Works Railway, which connected the Australian Portland Cement Co's cement works in Fyansford with its limestone quarry, had a 1300 metre long tunnel, the longest rail tunnel in Victoria (excepting the underground sections of the City Loop).

=== Henry's Tunnels ===
Two tunnels were built on a timber tramway linking Henry's Sawmill with the Victorian Railways terminus at Forrest in 1902 and were in use by 1903. They remained in use until about 1927. Steam locomotives hauling logs from the Otway Forest to sawmills, had fold-down funnels to pass through the tunnels.

== List of tunnel lengths and dates ==
Tunnel name	Construction date	Length		Tracks	Line	Location
Tunnel name	Construction date	m	ft	Tracks	Line	Location
Big Hill	1859–60	390	1,280	2->1	Deniliquin	North: 36°49′36″S 144°14′54″E
Elphinstone	1859–60	385	1,263	2->1	Deniliquin	East: 37°06′18″S 144°18′33″E; West: 37°06′20″S 144°18′17″E
Cheviot	1889	201	659	1	Mansfield Alexandra	East: 37°12′23″S 145°30′05″E; West: 37°12′28″S 145°30′00″E
Tarrawarra	1888	154	505	1	Healesville	East: 37°39′41″S 145°28′36″E; West: 37°39′41″S 145°28′30″E
South Geelong	1874	422	1,385	1	Colac	North: 38°08′51″S 144°21′15″E; South: 38°09′04″S 144°21′11″E
Heidelberg	1902 & 2018	68	223	1->2	Hurstbridge	Midpoint: 37°45′14″S 145°03′54″E
Jolimont	1901	115	377	2	Hurstbridge	37°49′00″S 144°59′18″E
West Richmond	1901	149	489	2	Hurstbridge	37°48′57″S 144°59′25″E
Portland Harbour	1870	40	130	1	Portland Harbour	38°20′37″S 141°36′23″E
Geelong Harbour	1859	100	330	1	Cunningham Pier	38°08′42″S 144°21′25″E
Bunbury Street	1926-8	420	1,380	2 DG	Independent Goods	West: 37°48′08″S 144°54′08″E; East: 37°48′13″S 144°54′24″E
Geelong Cement Works	1928	1,300	4,300	1	Fyansford Cement Works Railway (private)	West: 38°06′54″S 144°18′09″E; East: 38°06′54″S 144°18′09″E approx.
The Bump	1925	313	1,027	1	Powelltown Tramway (private)	37°51′57″S 145°45′57″E
Henry's	1902	437	1,434	1	Henry's Timber Tramway (private)	38°35′20″S 143°45′02″E
Henry's	1902	70	230	1	Henry's Timber Tramway (private)	38°35′20″S 143°45′02″E

Track legend
Code	Description
DG	Dual gauge
2->1	Originally 2 tracks, reduced to 1 track
1->2	Originally 1 track, increased to 2 tracks
