= Yering railway station =

Closed railway station in Melbourne, Victoria

Yering

General information
- Coordinates: 37°41′36″S 145°22′33″E
- Line: Healesville
- Platforms: 1
- Tracks: 1

Other information
- Status: Closed

History
- Opened: 15 May 1888
- Closed: 15 March 1981

Services
Preceding station	VicRail	Following station
Coldstream towards Lilydale	Healesville line	Yarra Glen towards Healesville
List of closed railway stations in Melbourne
Location

Yering is a closed railway station, located up from Macintyre Lane, Yering, Victoria, Australia, on the now-closed Healesville line. The station was opened on 15 May 1888, when the partly-completed line was opened as far as Yarra Glen. The station was closed on 9 December 1980, when passenger train services ceased on the Healesville line. The line was not officially closed until 10 March 1983.

== History ==
The track from Coldstream to Yarra Glen was formerly leased by the Yarra Valley Tourist Railway, but the lease was discontinued when the poor condition of bridges on that section of the track made it unlikely that any trains would run on it.

In 2020, the Yarra Valley rail trail opened. As part of this, the platform at Yering was rebuilt and is currently the end of the trail.
