= Gulf Station (Victoria) =

Heritage-listed homestead in Melbourne, Victoria, Australia

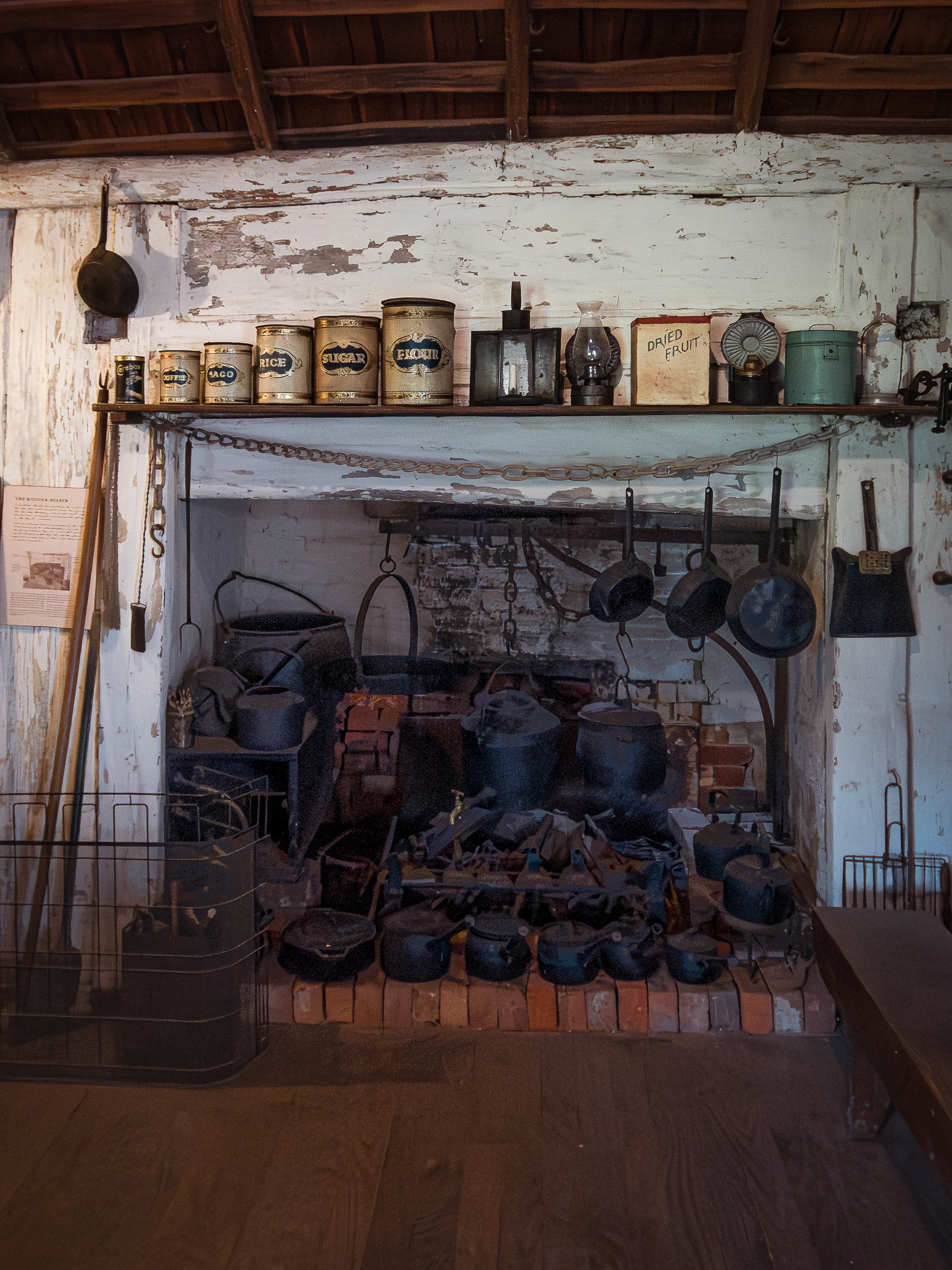
- The kitchen fireplace of the homestead, in 2023

- Location of the homestead in Greater Metropolitan Melbourne

General information
- Status: Completed
- Type: Homestead
- Architectural style: Rustic bush hut
- Location: 1029 Melba Highway, Yarra Glen, Yarra Ranges, Melbourne, Victoria, Australia
- Coordinates: 37°38′50″S 145°23′05″E
- Completed: 1855; 171 years ago
- Client: William Bell and family
- Owner: Bell family (1855–1951); Victorian Government (since 1976)

Technical details
- Structural system: Slab hut
- Material: Timber; shingle roof; corrugated iron; weatherboard; bricks
- Grounds: 16 ha (40 acres) (since 1976)

Design and construction
- Main contractor: James McPherson

Website
- nationaltrust.org.au

Site notes
- Management: National Trust of Australia (Victoria)
- Public access: Twice per month: first Thursday, last Sunday

Victorian Heritage Register
- Official name: Gulf Station
- Type: Registered place
- Criteria: A, D
- Designated: 12 May 1976
- Reference no.: H0384
- Heritage overlay no.: HO8
- Categories: Farming and Grazing; Residential buildings (private)

Register of the National Estate
- Official name: Gulf Station
- Type: Defunct register
- Designated: 21 March 1978
- Reference no.: 5689

Gulf Station is a homestead that also contains a prefabricated house, located at 1029 Melba Highway in Yarra Glen, in the Yarra Ranges, in the north eastern suburbs of Melbourne, in Victoria, Australia.

The homestead was built from 1855 on the traditional lands of the Wurundjeri people and was added to the Victorian Heritage Register on 12 May 1976 in recognition of its historical and architectural significance; and was also added to non-statutory lists by the Victorian branch of the National Trust on 20 March 1975 and the now defunct Register of the National Estate on 21 March 1978.

Owned by the Victorian Government since 1976, the homestead and 16-hectare (40-acre) grounds are managed by the National Trust of Australia (Victoria).

The prefabricated house dates from the 1870s and was moved to the Gulf Station site in 2010, and prior to this date was nearby on Maroondah Highway, since 1927.

== History ==
=== Early Colonial settlement ===
Yering Station was established as a pastoral run in 1837 by prominent settlers William Ryrie, and his brothers, Donald and James. The 17,401-hectare (43,000-acre) property is associated with the earliest phase of grazing and settlement in the region, only months after Governor Sir Richard Bourke's proclamation authorising settlement of the Port Phillip District. The Ryrie brothers drove 250 head of cattle from the Braidwood district of New South Wales, depasturing their stock in the Upper Yarra Valley.

The surveyor Robert Hoddle explored this area in 1838. The open flood plain attracted other early pastoralists from Melbourne and during the early 1860s a township was established, known as Yarra Flats. In 1889 the town changed its name to Yarra Glen.

=== Establishment of Gulf Station ===
The origins of Gulf Station are not clear. John Dickson may have occupied the site of the station as early as 1844. It is possible that part of the existing kitchen wing may be an 1840s structure originally erected as a combined hut and animal shelter. In 1855, Dickson sold a covenant for the Gulf Station pre-emptive right to William Bell and his son-in-law, Thomas Armstrong, both Scottish migrants. Bell and Armstrong bought the freehold for Gulf Station in October 1858. However, it seems that it was one of Bell's three sons, William Bell Jr, who mainly occupied the station. Around this time the homestead was built, beginning as a small rectangular cottage.

In 1860 William Bell Jr married Mary Ann Little. The couple had eight children, four sons and four daughters. As the Bell family grew the small cottage at Gulf Station developed into a large family home, with a variety of farm buildings. Both William Bell Jr and Mary Ann's parents also lived at Gulf Station at various times. In 1870 William Bell Snr died at Gulf Station, leaving it in the ownership of his son. When William Bell Jr died in 1877, his widow Mary Ann continued to run the station, that grew according to need between the 1850s and World War I. Eventually, she was helped by her children, most of whom remained at Gulf Station for the rest of their lives.

The station stayed in Bell family hands until the 1951 death of Dinah Bell, last living child of William and Mary Ann. The property was then sold to soldier settler Jack Smedley.

In 1976 the Victorian Government purchased the 16-hectare (40-acre) remnants of the property and appointed the Victorian branch of the National Trust to manage the property.

In 2010 an 1870s prefabricated house was relocated from the Maroondah Highway in Croydon to Gulf Station. The house was originally moved from New South Wales, where it was said to have been a former detention centre or a teacher's residence. It is a unique form of prefabricated construction not known elsewhere in Victoria.

== Description ==
=== Homestead ===
The complex consists of numerous vernacular timber (indigenous gum and stringybark) structures including the homestead, kitchen, schoolhouse, house stable, whelping kennels, working horse stable, pig sty, milking bails, slaughterhouse and sheep dip, shearing shed, and butcher shop, set within a garden and farmland setting. Some ten buildings are built in timber slab construction, some of vertical and some of horizontal slabs, with peeled logs used as structural members and roofs of split shingles, now covered with corrugated iron. The weatherboard shearing shed and various additions to the homestead are later. The homestead built by James McPherson to the south along the Yarra River.

Gulf Station is historically significant as one of the best remaining complete sets of solid timber slab farm buildings, which are representative of Victoria’s earliest farming heritage. As an exposition of early pastoral life, its coherence as a complex is remarkably intact, comprising the total needs of a functioning farm in the second half of the nineteenth century. The significance of the site is enhanced by the survival of remnants of the orchard, flower and vegetable gardens, which enables an understanding of domestic life and the self-sufficiency of the farm. The original post and rail fencing dates to the 1850s and is one of the best surviving examples from this period.

The buildings stand on a gentle rise above the Yarra River floodplain. The original homestead has a deeply recessed brick paved verandah which is supported on solid tree-trunk posts. It is connected by a covered walkway to the more recent homestead, which has a magnificent garden sloping away to the south-east.

=== Prefabricated timber house ===
Prefabricated timber house

General information
- Status: Completed
- Type: Prefabricated house
- Coordinates: 37°38′55″S 145°23′16″E
- Completed: 1870s; 155 years ago
- Relocated: 1927; 99 years ago; 2010; 16 years ago

Technical details
- Material: Timber; weatherboard; corrugated iron; skillion roof

Victorian Heritage Register
- Official name: Prefabricated timber house
- Type: Registered place
- Designated: 13 February 2003
- Reference no.: H2024
- Heritage overlay no.: HO8
- Category: Residential buildings (private)

Register of the National Estate
- Official name: Prefabricated Timber House
- Type: Defunct register
- Designated: undated
- Reference no.: 103907

The prefabricated house has been dismantled and re-erected at least once. It is believed to have been built in the 1870s. It was moved from New South Wales where it was said to have been a former detention centre. Rate books show that the structure was erected on Maroondah Highway in 1927 and was used as a residence since then. The house has been located in the grounds of Gulf Station since c. 2010.

Located on the traditional lands of the Wurundjeri people, the prefabricated house was added to the Victorian Heritage Register on 13 February 2003 in recognition of its architectural significance; and was also added to the non-statutory and now defunct Register of the National Estate on an unknown date.

The building is a single storey, double-fronted timber house with a corrugated iron gable roof. The front verandah with skillion roof is partially enclosed. At the rear is a small gabled weatherboard addition. The wall framing consists of grooved Oregon posts with solid panels slotted between. There is evidence of open mortice and tenon jointing fixing the bottom of the panels to the wall plate. The panels are clad in weatherboards externally and are boarded flush internally. Internally the main building comprises six rooms, although the layout has clearly been modified. The floor is structurally discontinuous to the perimeter walls. The timber ceiling has a square grid frame into which solid panels are dropped. A number of the ceiling panels have holes drilled across their corners, apparently for ventilation. Internal doors have observation holes.

The fenestration has been altered, including the insertion of two louvred windows in the north wall. The original windows, of which only a few survive, were casements with fine glazing bars, and shutters. One set of shutters survives.

The original date of construction of the building is not known but is believed to be c. 1870s. Its construction suggests that it was built by government rather than by private enterprise. There is a strong resemblance of the panellised system to portable schools built in the nineteenth century for the Victorian Education Department. The building may have been a teacher's residence, although the observation holes also suggest some form of detention purpose.

The house is of architectural significance due to its unique form of prefabricated construction not known elsewhere in Australia. Buildings with panellised construction were imported into Australia from England from the 1820s, a well-known example being La Trobe's Cottage in 1839. Such buildings continued to be imported into Victoria during the 1850s and inspired the Victorian government to produce locally built portable buildings of similar construction for institutional purposes. Whilst the exact provenance of the building is not yet known, it is an important part of the lineage of prefabricated buildings erected in Australia.

== See also ==
- Architecture of Melbourne
- List of places on the Victorian Heritage Register in the Shire of Yarra Ranges
