= Yarra Flats =

Yarra Flats may refer to places in Victoria, Australia:

- the former name of Yarra Glen
- Yarra Flats Park on the Yarra River at Bulleen
