= Yarra Glen railway station =

Railway station in Victoria, Australia

Yarra Glen
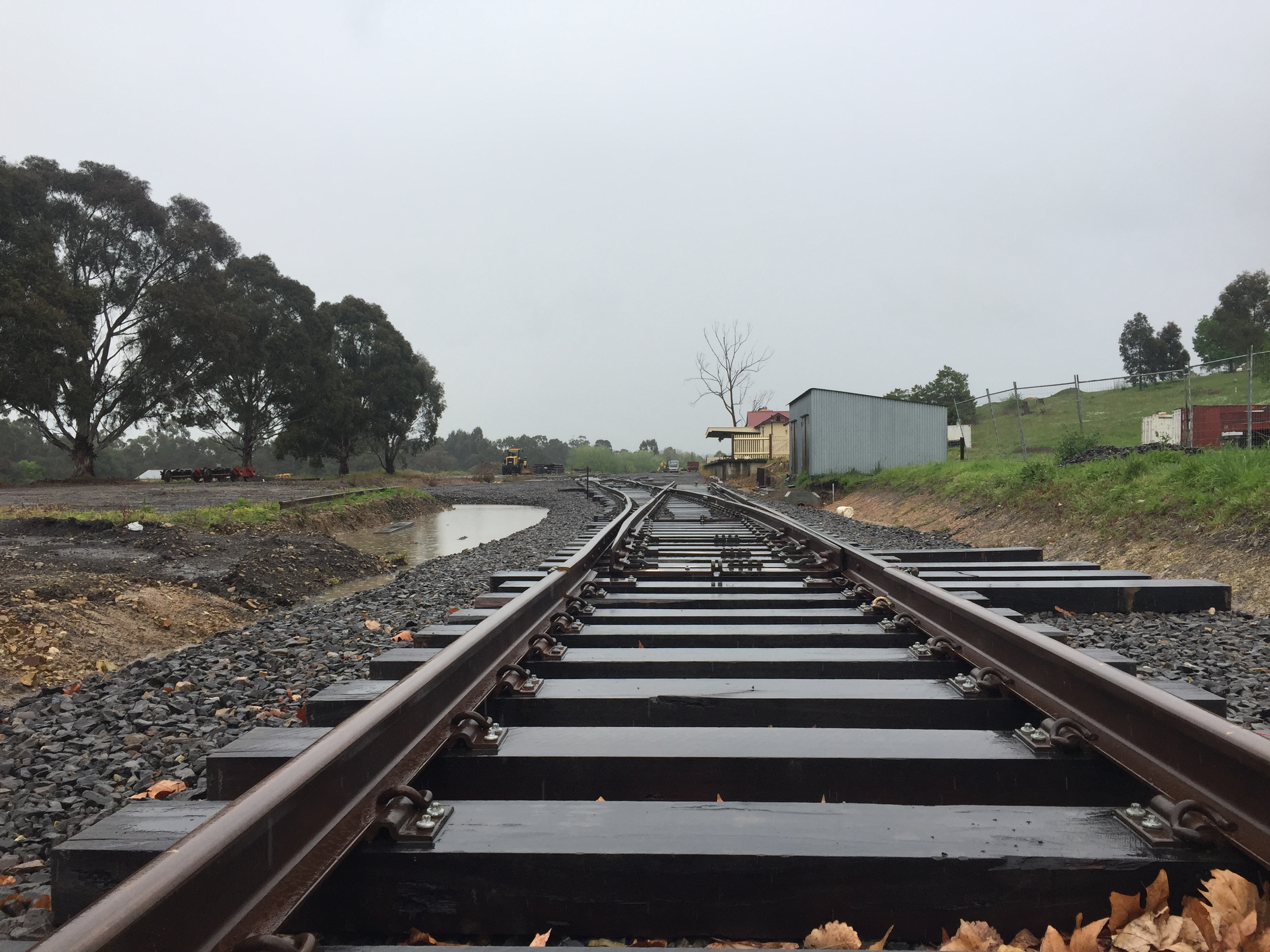
- Yarra Glen station railway tracks and station under restoration, September 2021

General information
- Coordinates: 37°39′41″S 145°22′21″E
- System: Future Yarra Valley Railway station
- Owner: VicTrack
- Operator: Yarra Valley Railway
- Lines: Yarra Valley Railway (future); Healesville (former)
- Distance: 51.7 km (32.1 mi) from Flinders Street
- Platforms: 1
- Tracks: 2

Other information
- Status: Unstaffed, under restoration
- Station code: YGN
- Website: http://www.yvr.org.au/

History
- Opened: 15 May 1888
- Closed: 9 December 1980

Former services
Preceding station	VicRail	Following station
Yering towards Lilydale	Healesville line	Tarrawarra towards Healesville
List of closed railway stations in Melbourne

Future services
Preceding station	Heritage railways	Following station
Terminus	Yarra Valley Railway	Tarrawarra
Location

Yarra Glen is a former railway station on the Healesville line. The station opened in 1888 and closed in 1981 with the line. However, the station is currently undergoing restoration to become the city-end terminus of the Yarra Valley Railway, which operates over part of the former railway from here to Healesville.

== History ==
The first station on the site was built in 1888–1889 when the railway line was extended from Lilydale to Healesville. The settlement had been previously named Burgoyne, but when the railway was extended, the decision was made to rename it Yarra Glen. Though Yarra Glen was a small settlement, its station was often used for supplying Melbourne with produce from nearby farms.

The station closed along with the Healesville line in 1980. It sat idle for some years, and suffered some major fire damage to the roof. However, the station is being restored by the Yarra Valley Railway, which is based at Healesville railway station. The railway is currently open on weekends and public holidays, offering return trips from Healesville through the tunnel near Tarrawarra and back, using Walker railmotor RM22.

The Black Saturday bushfires on 7 February 2009 burnt a good deal of grassland and forest in the Yarra Valley. The fire also caused the destruction of 13 timber trestle bridges between Yarra Glen Station and Healesville. Bridges of varying lengths were lost, the main ones being those on the Yarra River flats, including a long one over the river itself. The bridges, between Yarra Glen and Yering, are visible from the Melba Highway when approaching Yarra Glen. Six other bridges were destroyed, which were not part of the Yarra Valley Railway, and sleepers were burnt out over approx 2 km, also outside the running section of the railway. Until the 13 bridges and associated rail track can be restored to operating condition, Yarra Glen station is orphaned from the remaining part of the Yarra Valley Railway. Rebuilding progressed quickly during 2015, to the point where the reconstructed bridges, this time in concrete and steel, are clearly visible from the road close by.

Yarra Glen Station is being rebuilt from the ground up by dedicated volunteers, including the Yarra Glen Men's Shed, and the finished building will closely match its original design. It was scheduled to be completed in 2017. Work has since been completed on this project.

With the Black Saturday bushfires, it destroyed the timber bridges between Yarra Glen and Coldstream, the possible future reinstatement of railway services to Lilydale has been made highly improbable, because it would require a considerable amount of money and time.
