= The Towers, Lilydale =

Heritage-listed house in Melbourne, Victoria, Australia

The Towers
- Location of the house in Greater Metropolitan Melbourne

General information
- Status: Completed
- Type: House
- Architectural style: Victorian
- Location: 6–10 The Eyrie, Lilydale, Yarra Ranges, Melbourne, Victoria, Australia
- Coordinates: 37°45′19″S 145°21′27″E
- Completed: 1876; 150 years ago
- Renovated: 1886; 1908; 1910
- Client: Richard or Alfred Hand
- Owner: Richard or Alfred Hand (1876–1886); Andrew and Elizabeth Fulton (1886–1893); Edward Janson (1893–1901); Joseph Bell (1901–1918); Robert and Ella Hannah (1918–1929)

Technical details
- Material: Bricks; corrugated iron; slate; stucco
- Floor count: 2

Victorian Heritage Register
- Official name: The Towers
- Type: Registered place
- Delisted: 11 December 1985
- Reference no.: H0612
- Heritage overlay no.: HO4
- Category: Residential buildings (private)

Register of the National Estate
- Official name: The Towers
- Type: Defunct register
- Designated: 21 March 1978
- Reference no.: 5703

The Towers is a house located at 6–10 The Eyrie in Lilydale, in the Yarra Ranges, in the north eastern suburbs of Melbourne, in Victoria, Australia.

Built in 1876 on the traditional lands of the Wurundjeri people, the house was added to the Victorian Heritage Register on 11 December 1985 in recognition of its historical and architectural significance; and was also added to non-statutory lists by the Victorian branch of the National Trust on 13 June 1968 and the now defunct Register of the National Estate on 21 March 1978.

== History ==
Construction of The Towers was commenced in 1876 and was extended in three stages.

It was started by Alfred Hand, a tanner, or Richard Hand, vigneron, both members of a family well known in local business, fruit and wine growing. The oldest section, being a single storey Colonial vernacular homestead was built in c. 1876, and reflects the traditions of rural Victoria in the 1870s, constructed of brick with a hipped corrugated iron roof. It was sited on a prominent slope to the north of Lilydale.

The castellated two-level section dates from c. 1886 and was built for vigneron Alfred Fulton and his wife, Elizabeth (nee Hand), in a distinctive and picturesque style, with stuccoed brick and a slate roof. This section is distinguished by its porch, tower, and cellars. The twin towers and the entrance porch are a late example of Naive Medieval Revivalism. These make the house, with its elevated castellations, an important local landmark.

The next owner, in 1893, was Edward Janson who named the house The Towers and used the name, with an illustration, as the label for his famous wine. He sold to Joseph Bell in 1901 who completed the complex with the third stage and added a service winged coach house in c. 1908, and the stables were rebuilt in c. 1910, after a fire the previous year.

Bell sold to Robert Campbell Hannah, J. P., and his wife, Ella, in 1918, until his death in 1929. The 6-hectare (15-acre) property was listed for auction the following year. The Towers was subsequently subdivided and is now on a suburban allotment.

== Description ==
The Towers has significant associations with the development of viticulture in the Yarra Valley which was centred on Lilydale. It was an area renowned for the high quality of its wines. Although the complex is of uncertain architectural origins, it is representative of an important facet of architectural style in the Victorian era.

The Towers is a landmark in Lilydale and has historical associations with the nineteenth century when Lilydale was a wine growing centre. The house is architecturally notable for the way in which the early house has been combined with substantial later additions and is important also for both its cellars and as a very late example of castellated Victorian Rustic Gothic architecture, applied in this case to an otherwise Victorian Classical Revival design. The porch is an unusual and notable feature.

== See also ==
- Architecture of Melbourne
- List of places on the Victorian Heritage Register in the Shire of Yarra Ranges
