= Tarrawarra railway station =

Railway station in Victoria, Australia

Tarrawarra
- Site of the former station, December 2012

General information
- Coordinates: 37°39′24″S 145°25′28″E
- System: Future Yarra Valley Railway station
- Owner: VicTrack
- Operator: Yarra Valley Railway
- Lines: Yarra Valley Railway; Healesville (former)
- Distance: 56.7 km (35.2 mi) from Flinders Street
- Platforms: 1
- Tracks: 1

Other information
- Status: Under restoration
- Station code: TWA
- Website: http://www.yvr.org.au/

History
- Opened: 15 May 1888
- Closed: 15 March 1981

Services
Preceding station	Heritage railways	Following station
Terminus	Yarra Valley Railway	Healesville

Former services
Preceding station	VicRail	Following station
Yarra Glen towards Lilydale	Healesville line	Healesville Terminus
List of closed railway stations in Melbourne
Future services
Preceding station	Heritage railways	Following station
Yarra Glen	Yarra Valley Railway	Healesville
Location

Tarrawarra was a station on the former Healesville line between Yarra Glen and Healesville stations, in Victoria, Australia. The station opened in 1889 and closed along with the line in December 1980. In the 1970s, timetables showed that the station was a flag stop because of the small number of passengers using the station.

== History ==
The section of track through the location of the station is now maintained by the Yarra Valley Railway, which is based at Healesville. A tourist service operates on weekends, and school and public holidays, using a restored Walker railmotor, to the rear of the Tarrawarra Estate Winery, just through the tunnel about 3 km east of the former station.

Tarrawarra station is expected to become a crossing loop when the station reopens as part of the restoration of the line to Yarra Glen. Work has commenced to replace the wooden bridges between the station and Yarra Glen, which were burned in the Black Saturday bushfires in 2009. Currently the Tarrawarra yard is being used as a major staging area for the restoration project.

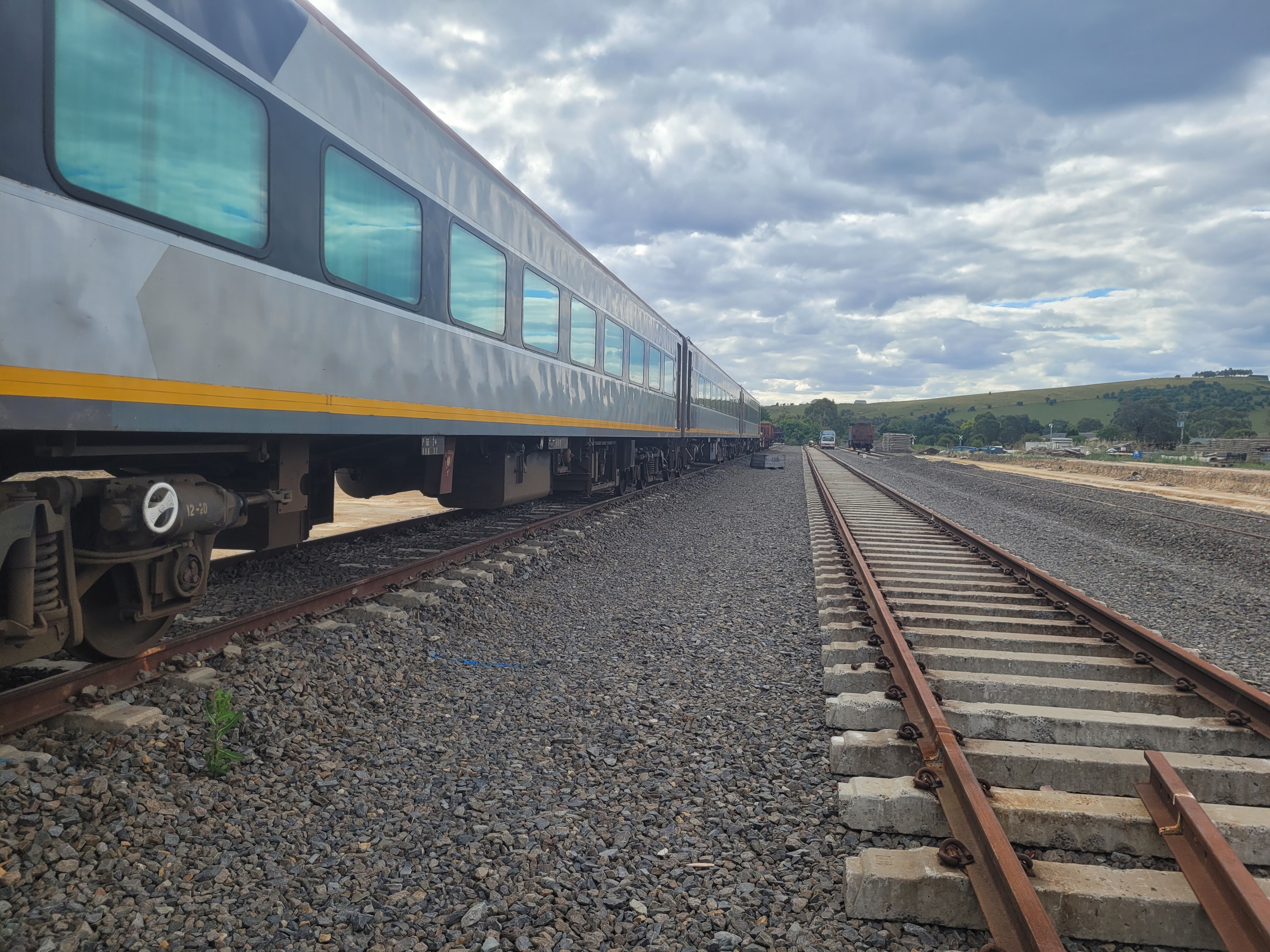
N type carriages stored at Tarrawarra Station

Tarrawarra tunnel, December 2012
