= Yarra Valley Railway =

Heritage railway in Victoria, Australia

Coordinates: 37.6597°S 145.4891°E

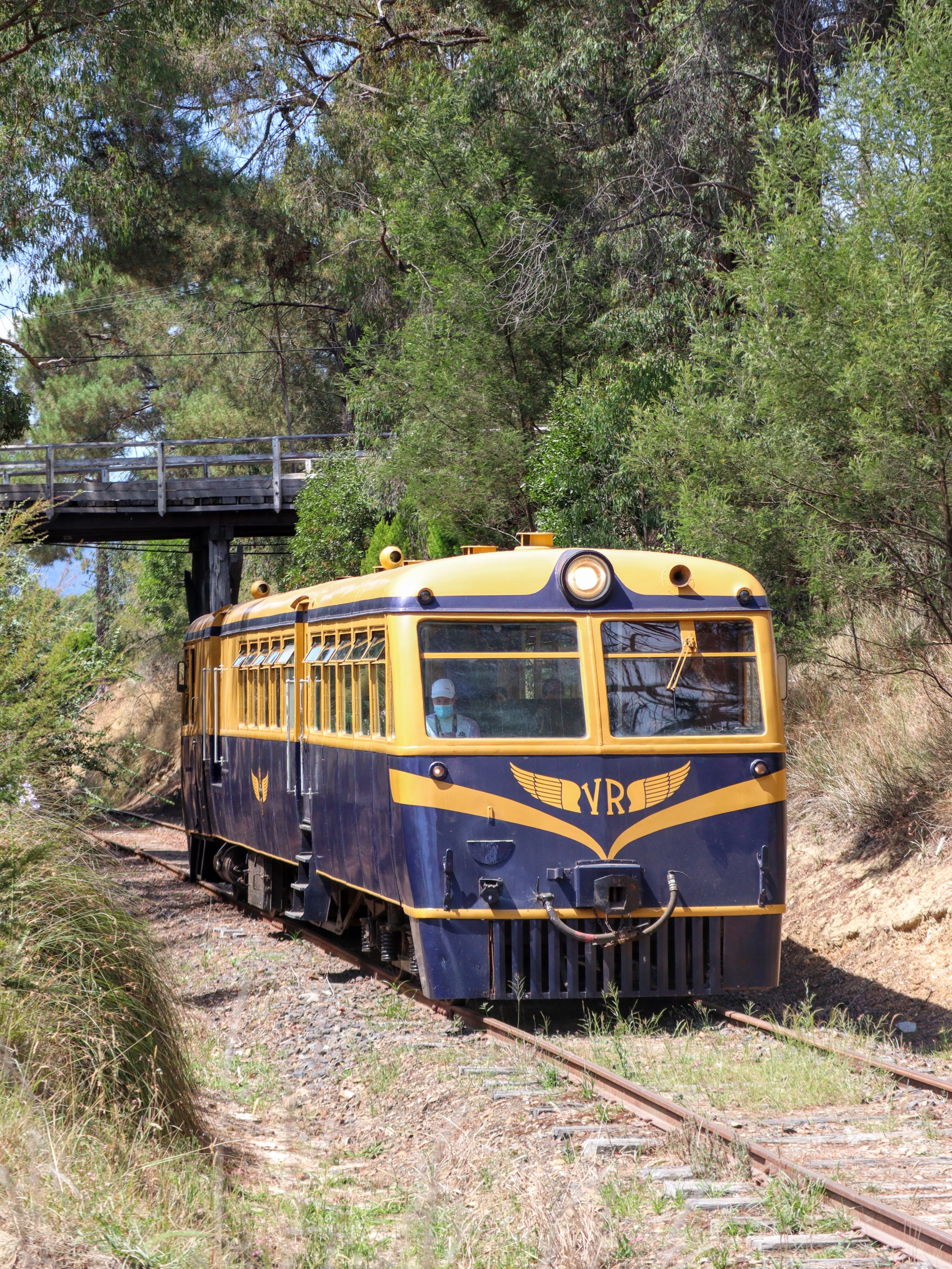
- 22RM passes under the old Donovans Road bridge on the Yarra Valley Railway, 2022

Overview
- Service type: Tourist service
- Status: Operational tourist services from Healesville to Tunnel Hill, relaying track to Yarra Glen
- Locale: Melbourne, Victoria, Australia
- First service: 1985; 41 years ago
- Current operator: Yarra Valley Tourist Railway (1988–Current)
- Former operator: Healesville Railway Cooperative (1984–1990)
- Website: Yarra Valley Tourist Railway

Route
- Termini: Healesville; Tunnel Hill
- Stops: 1 current stations; 2 stations being rebuilt
- Distance travelled: 3.970 km (2.467 mi)
- Service frequency: 60 minutes from 10am to 4pm Sunday, Public Holiday and Wednesday during School Holidays
- Line used: Healesville

Technical
- Track owner: Yarra Valley Tourist Railway

The Yarra Valley Railway is a heritage railway operating on a section of the former Healesville railway which operated between Lilydale and Healesville in the Yarra Valley area northeast of Melbourne, Australia.

== History ==
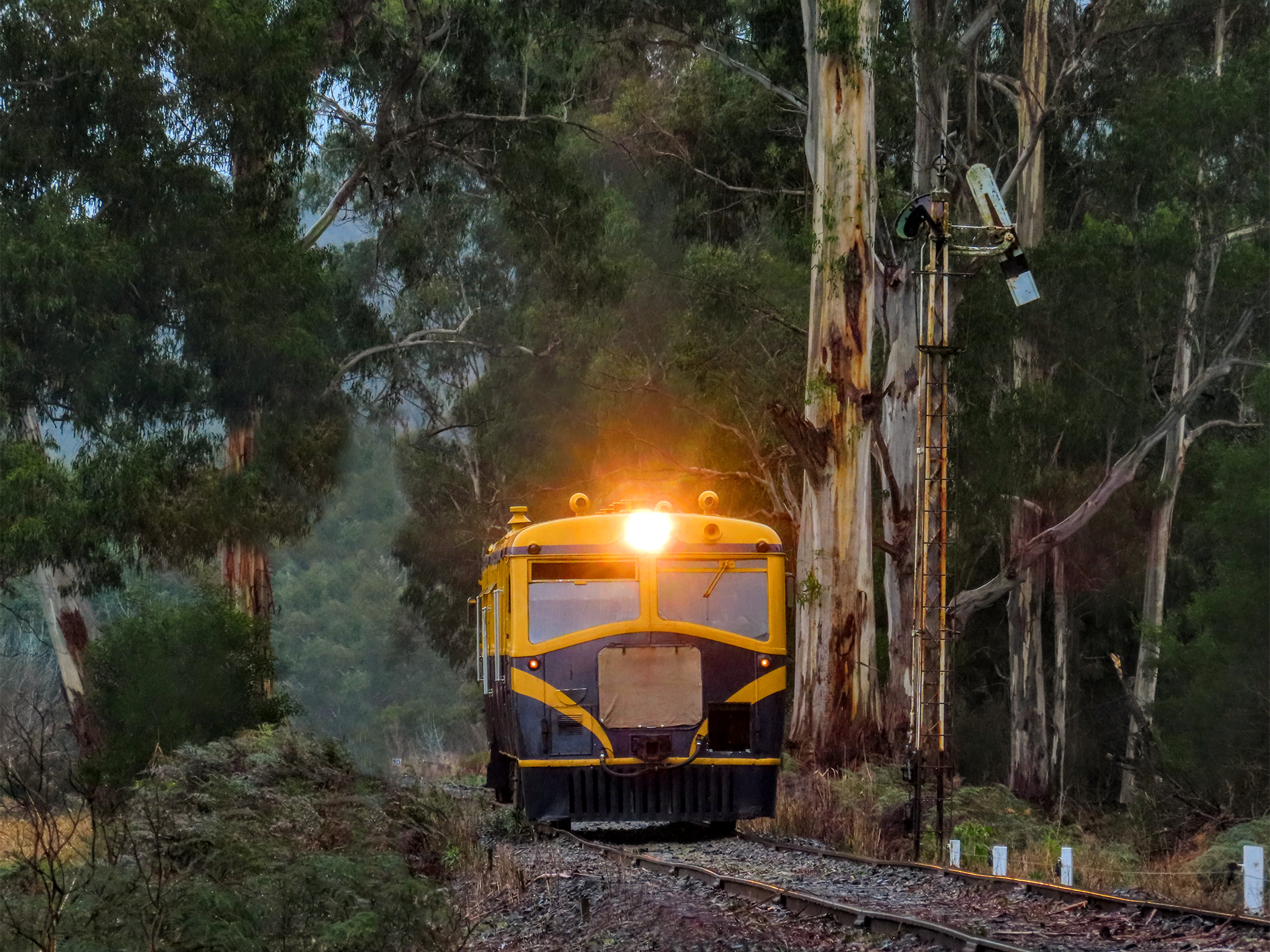
22RM trundles towards Healesville on a morning service, 2021

The Lilydale-Melbourne railway was extended from Lilydale to Yarra Flats (now known as Yarra Glen) on the 15 May 1888, with intermediate stations at Coldstream and Yering. Part of the structure included a long timber viaduct with 502 openings near Yarra Glen, spanning the Yarra River and the adjacent flood plains. The extension of the line from Yarra Glen to Healesville required a 1 in 40 (2.5%) climb into a 154.4 metre tunnel, with a corresponding descent at nearly the same grade. The Healesville Station opened on 1 March 1889 with an intermediate station at Tarrawarra.

Traffic on the line included timber, livestock, milk and dairy products. Early timetables included regular goods services specifically for transporting milk.

The last regular steam passenger service was hauled in August 1964. From this time until closure of the line in 1980 passenger services were run using Rail Motors, initially with Walker railmotors but due to degrading track quality the Walkers were replaced by Diesel Electric Railmotors (DERMs) from 1978 onwards. After 9 December 1980 no services operated beyond Coldstream and the Healesville-Coldstream section of the line was officially closed to all traffic on 10 March 1983. The Healesville Railway Cooperative was established in 1984 to reopen the line and in 1985 was granted an 'Order In Council' for this section by the Victorian State Government to operate the line as a tourist railway. It was partially reopened as far as Yarra Glen for tourist charter services in 1986 following major bridgework. However, these services ceased by 1990 when the Healesville Railway Cooperative merged with the Yarra Valley Tourist Railway, who began running trolley services on the Healesville-Yarra Glen section.

During the Black Saturday bushfires of February 2009 Yarra Glen station came under ember attack and two timber trestle bridges near Tarrawarra were burnt down in a fast-moving grass fire.

Following a track renewal and bridge reconstruction campaign, on 17 July 2010 the official launch of the Walker Railmotor service occurred with the first passenger train service to leave Healesville Railway Station in over 30 years. Mechanical issues cancelled services for most of February 2026., resulting in the YVR announcing the cessation of all passenger services until further notice. This pause in operations would allow the YVR to focus on rollingstock and track restoration, with a completion date yet to be determined.

== Current operations ==
Yarra Valley Railway (physical track)

History
- Work began: 1985
- Opened: Lilydale to Yarra Glen in 1985; Yarra Glen to Tarrawarra in 1988; Healesville to Tunnel Hill in 1990; Tunnel Hill to Tarrawarra in 1992
- Completed: 1990
- Reopened: Tarrawarra to Yarra Glen in 1993
- Closed: Lilydale to Yarra Glen in 1987; Yarra Glen to Tarrawarra in 1989; Yarra Glen to Tunnel Hill in 1994

Technical
- Line length: 12.982 km (8.07 mi)
- Num of tracks: Single track
- Track gauge: 1,600 mm (5 ft 3 in)

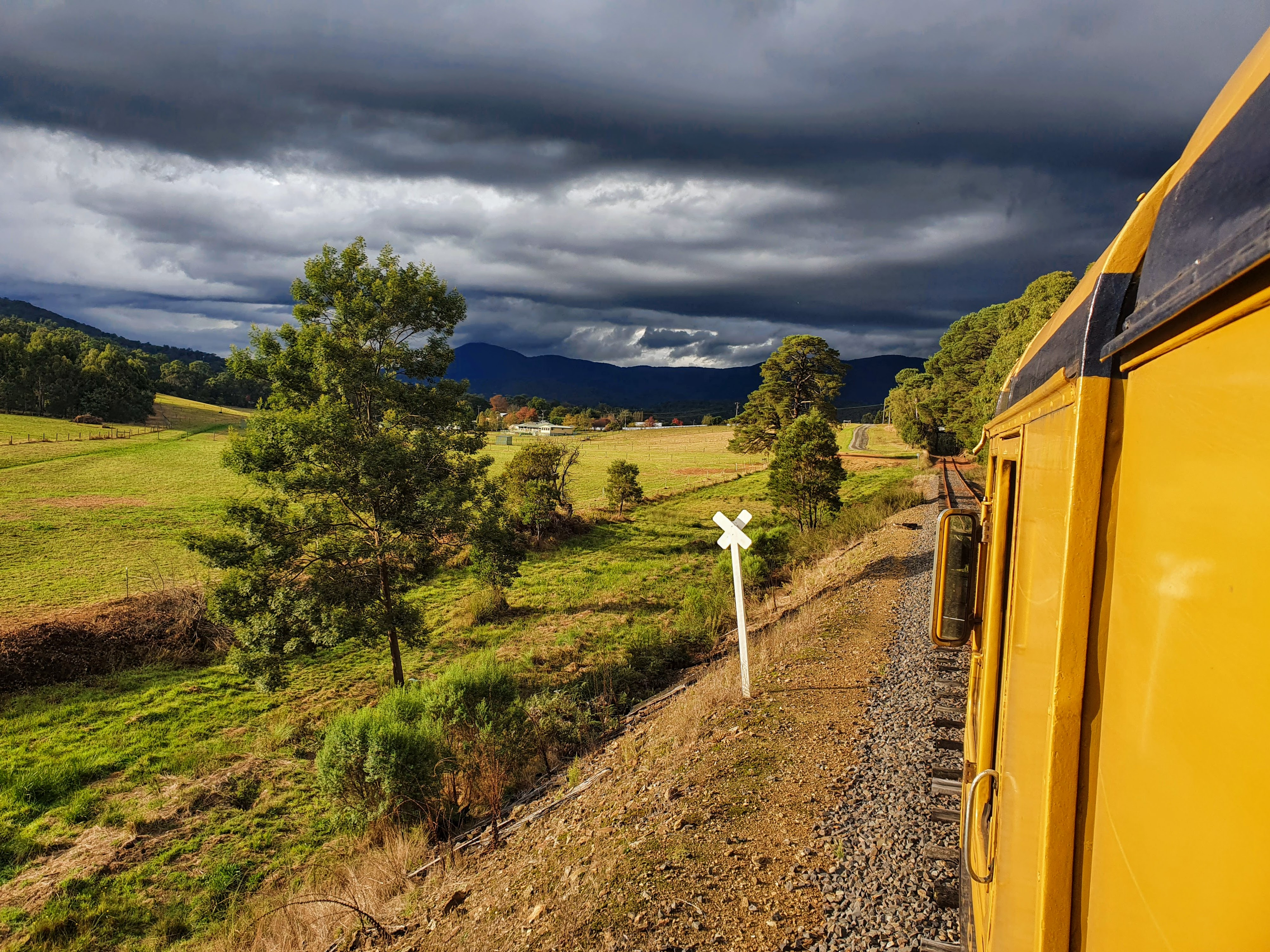
The view from restored rail motor 22RM whilst travelling on the Yarra Valley Railway, 2022

The Yarra Valley Railway runs a railmotor service from Healesville station to a point near the historic tunnel at Tarrawarra. Trains run on Sundays and public holidays, and some Saturdays, crossing the Watts River and travelling under the Donovans Road overbridge.

The railway is rebuilding the 5-mile-48-chain (9.0 km) section from that temporary terminus to Yarra Glen station. That involves the reconstruction of Yarra Glen and Tarrawarra stations, and the replacement of 14 timber trestle bridges within that section.

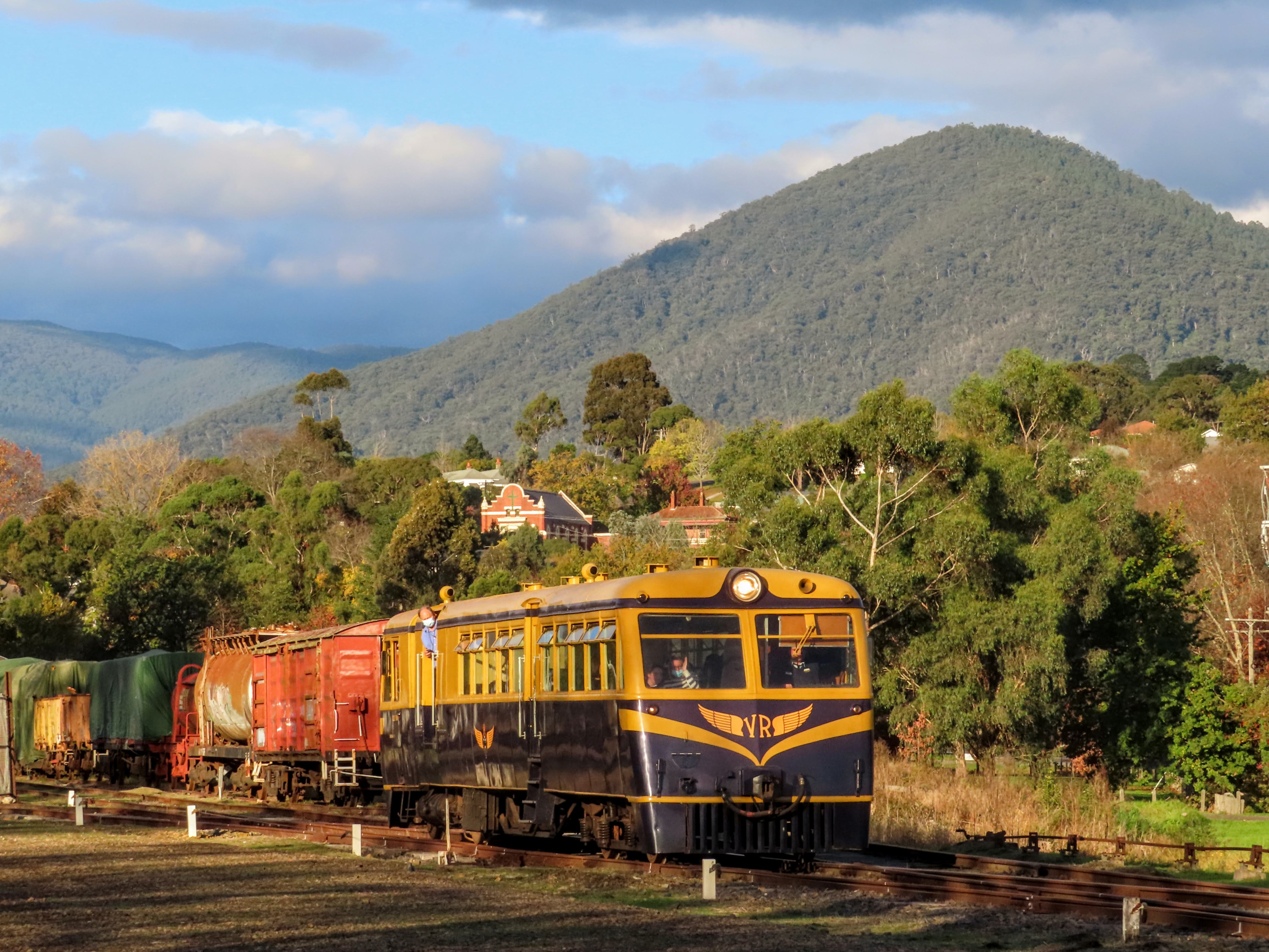
22RM runs a trip out of Healesville on a warm autumn afternoon, 2021

In February 2026, the Yarra Valley Railway announced the cessation of all passenger services until further notice. The railway said the move would allow its team to focus on the restoration of the track to Tarrawarra and Yarra Glen, as well as rolling stock refurbishment.

=== Station histories ===
Station	Opened	Closed	Age	Notes
Yarra Glen	15 May 1888	9 December 1980	92 years	Original service; Formerly Yarra Flats
Yarra Glen	1985	1989	4 years	Tourist service
Yarra Glen	1993	1994	12 months	Tourist service
Tarrawarra	15 May 1889	15 March 1981	91 years	Original service
Tarrawarra	1988	1989	12 months	Tourist service
Tarrawarra	1992	1994	24 months	Tourist service
Healesville	1 March 1889	12 September 1980	91 years	Original service
Healesville	1990		36 years	Tourist service

== Rollingstock ==
The railway is in possession of a number of locomotives and carriages, including the following:

=== Locomotives ===
Number	Image	Year built	Builder	Status	Notes
B 83		1953	Clyde Engineering, Granville NSW	Static Display	Victorian Railways B class locomotive. To be transferred from the Newport Railway Museum to Healesville.
J 516		1954	Vulcan Foundry, Newton-le-Willows, Lancashire	Stored	Victorian Railways J class coal-burning steam locomotive. Was plinthed in a park in Greensborough from 1975 until being acquired by YVTR in 1990. Stored at Healesville for possible future restoration.
J 541		1954	Vulcan Foundry, Newton-le-Willows, Lancashire	Overhaul	Victorian Railways J class oil-burning steam locomotive. Privately owned by a group including the YVR and some of its members. Stored at a number of locations (including Healesville) until 2003, when it was moved to the Puffing Billy Railway for restoration. After restoration, it was loaned to the Victorian Goldfields Railway, where it entered traffic on 5 September 2007. Left VGR in late 2011 for Newport Workshops for an overhaul for preparation to return to Healesville. From 16 May 2025, J541 was offered for sale by tender by Steamrail Victoria Inc., as unclaimed goods.
T 341		1956	Clyde Engineering, Granville NSW	Stored	Formerly on hire to El Zorro.
Y 109 (Y 145)		1963	Clyde Engineering, Granville NSW	Stored	Ex El Zorro, Formerly Commissioners Loco Y 109. Renumbered Y 145 2005.
Y 119		1963	Clyde Engineering, Granville NSW	Stored	Ex Ettamogha Rail Hub.
Y 135		1965	Clyde Engineering, Granville NSW	Stored	Ex South Gippsland Railway.
Y 136		1965	Clyde Engineering, Granville NSW	Operational	Ex Downer EDI Newport Workshops. Transferred to Tarrawarra 03/04/2025.
Y 142		1962	Clyde Engineering, Granville NSW	Stored	Ex Ettamogha Rail Hub.
Y 157		1968	Clyde Engineering, Granville NSW	Operational	Ex Ettamogha Rail Hub.
Y 161		1968	Clyde Engineering, Granville NSW	Operational	Ex V/Line.
Y 171		1968	Clyde Engineering, Granville NSW	Operational	Ex Ettamogah Rail Hub.
Y 174		1968	Clyde Engineering, Granville NSW	Operational	Ex Ettamogah Rail Hub.
W 250		1960	Tulloch Limited, Rhodes NSW	Operational	
17 RT			Newport Workshops	Stored	Formerly Sea Lake Shunter.
53 RT		1975	Newport Workshops	Operational	Tarrawarra shunter. Built on frame ex I 181. Formerly Ballarat & Redan Shunter.

=== Rail Motors ===
Number	Image	Year built	Builder	Status	Notes
22 RM		1948	Walkers, England	Operational	Walker Railmotor.
24 RM		1948	Walkers, England	Scrapped	Walker Railmotor. Ex Tallangatta Valley Steam Preservation Society, Huon
55 RM		1928	Newport Workshops	Under Restoration	"Super DERM". Ex South Gippsland Railway
58 MT		1952	Martin & King, Clayton	Under Restoration	Walker Railmotor Trailer. Ex Tallangatta Valley Steam Preservation Society, Huon
64 MT		1954	Martin & King, Clayton	Stored	Walker Railmotor Trailer. Ex Tallangatta Valley Steam Preservation Society, Huon

=== Carriages ===
Number	Image	Year built	Builder	Status	Notes
1 BW		1911	Newport Workshops	Stored Operational	Ex Steamrail Victoria
32 BW		1914	Newport Workshops	Under Restoration	Ex Steamrail Victoria
34 BW		1914	Newport Workshops, Smith & Party	Stored Operational	
35 BW		1914	Newport Workshops, Williams & Party	Stored	Ex Steamrail Victoria
43 BW		1925	Newport Workshops, Owens & Party	Underframe Only	Ex Steamrail Victoria
62 BW		1926	Newport Workshops, Barber & Party	Underframe Only	Ex Steamrail Victoria
ACN 9		1981	Newport Workshops	Stored Operational	
ACN 12		1982	Newport Workshops	Stored Operational	Transferred to Tarrawarra 12/09/2023
ACN 15		1982	Newport Workshops	Stored Operational	Transferred to Tarrawarra 27/03/2025
ACN 18		1982	Newport Workshops	Stored Operational	
BN 8		1981	Newport Workshops	Stored Operational	
BN 11		1982	Newport Workshops	Stored Operational	Transferred to Tarrawarra 12/09/2023
BN 13		1982	Newport Workshops	Stored Operational	Transferred to Tarrawarra 27/03/2025
BN 17		1982	Newport Workshops	Stored Operational	
BRN 38		1983	Newport Workshops	Stored Operational	
BRN 40		1983	Newport Workshops	Stored Operational	Transferred to Tarrawarra 27/03/2025
BRN 44		1983	Newport Workshops	Stored Operational	Transferred to Tarrawarra 12/09/2023
BRN 47		1983	Newport Workshops	Stored Operational	
BDN 2		1981	Newport Workshops	Stored Operational	Formerly BN 2.
BTN 253		1957	Newport Workshops	Stored Operational	Formerly 3 AZ.
BZN 272		1957	Newport Workshops	Stored Operational	Formerly 2 BZ. Transferred to Tarrawarra 03/04/2025

=== Guards Vans ===
Number	Image	Year built	Builder	Status	Notes
3 CA		1960	Newport Workshops		
4 CA		1960	Newport Workshops		
17 CW		1935	Newport Workshops	Stored	Ex South Gippsland Railway
58 Z		1932	Newport Workshops	Stored	Ex Tallangatta Valley Steam Preservation Society, Huon. Former Wondonga Breakdown Van.
19 ZD		1879	Williamstown Workshops	Stored Operational	
619 ZD		1928	Newport Workshops		Ex Steamrail Victoria
24 ZF		1962	Newport Workshops	Stored	Ex South Gippsland Railway
68 ZLP		1967		Stored	

== Line guide ==
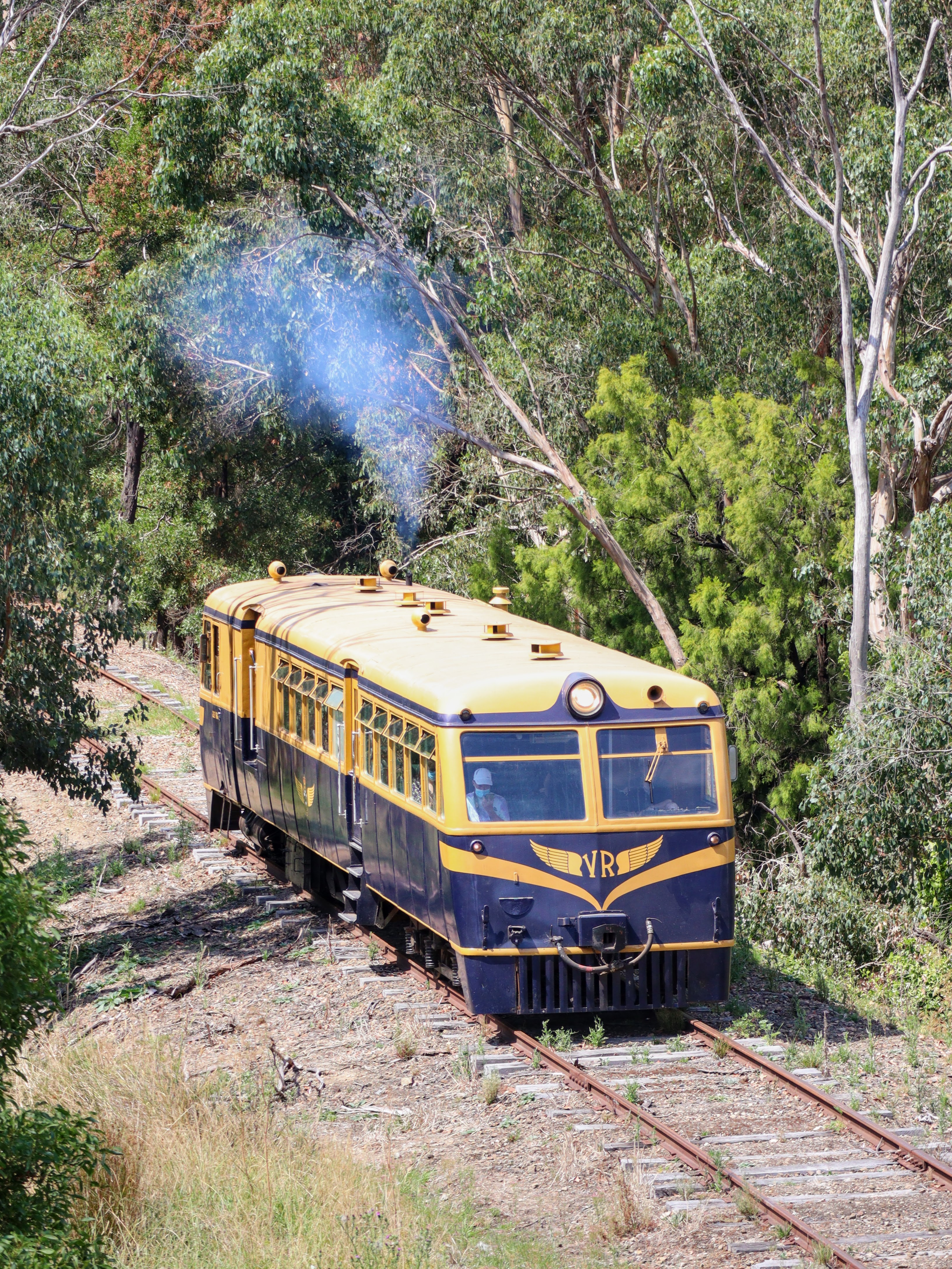
Restored Walker Rail Motor, 22RM, runs on the Yarra Valley Railway in Melbourne

The Yarra Valley Railway currently runs on a section of track from Healesville to the Tarrawarra Tunnel. The rest of the line between the stop board outside the Tarrawarra Tunnel exit and Yarra Glen is currently being restored.

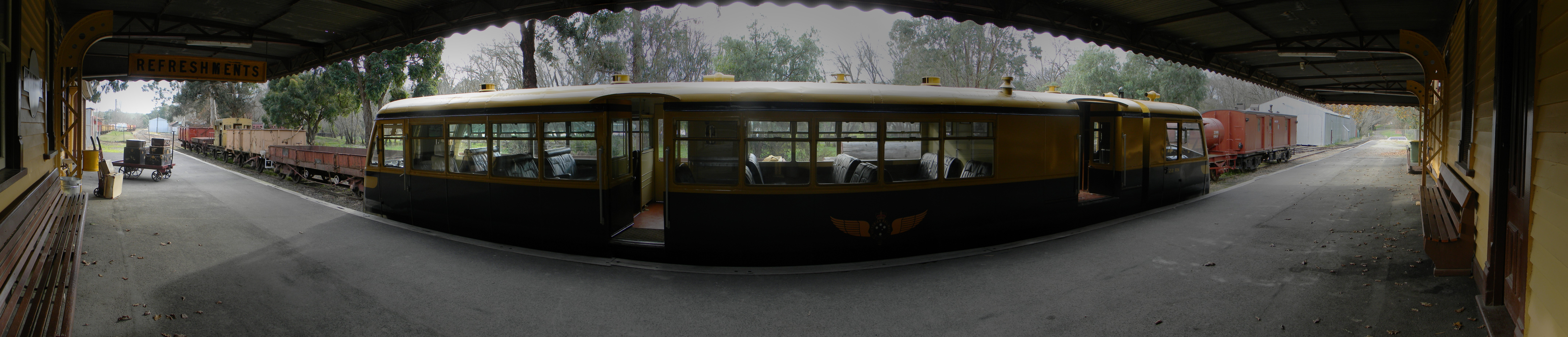
Panoramic shot of Healesville Station with the railmotor 22RM sitting in the platform

== See also ==
- Tourist and Heritage Railways Act
