= Healesville railway station =

Heritage railway station in Victoria, Australia

Healesville
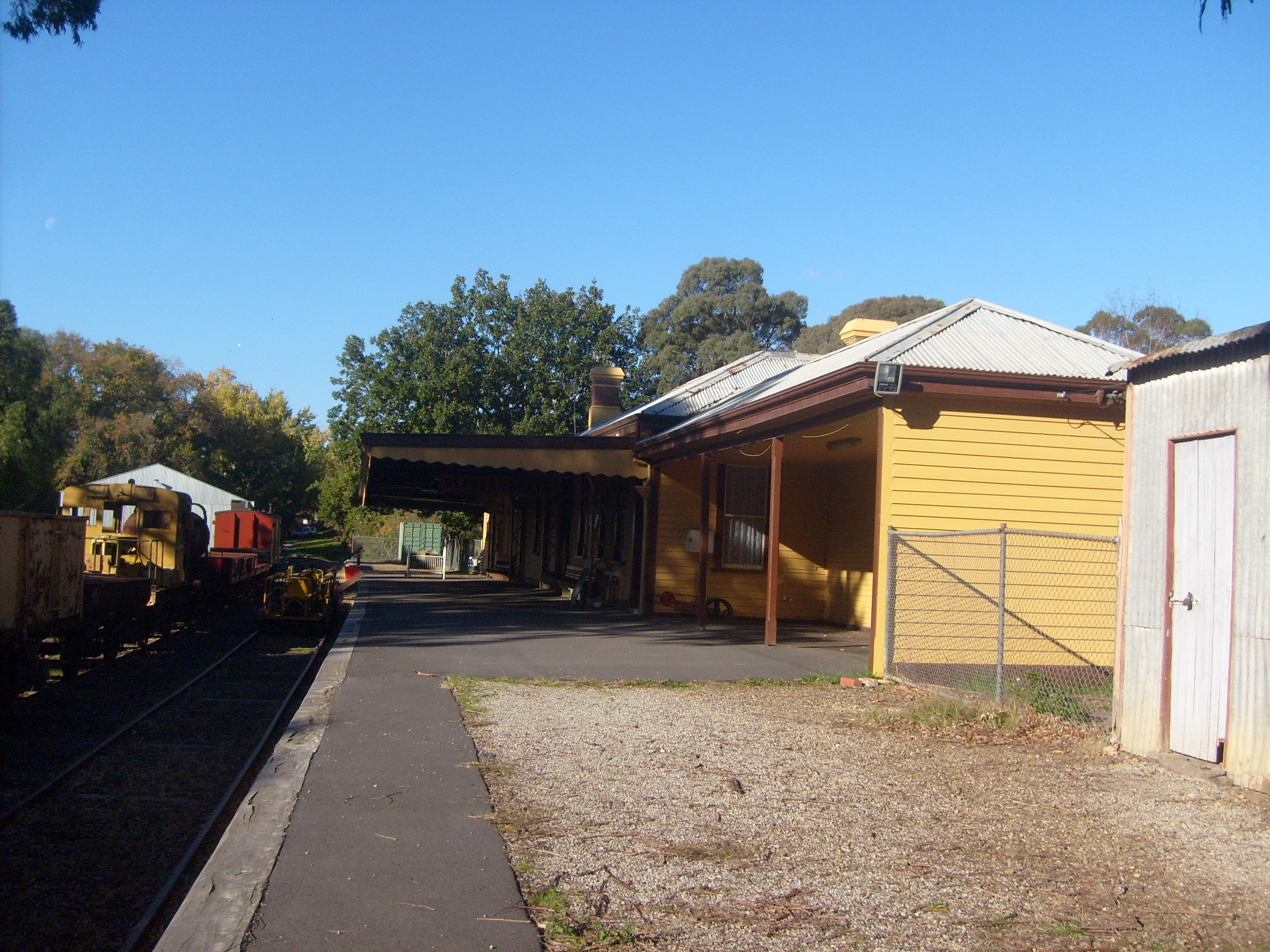
- Station building and platform, May 2009

General information
- Location: Healesville, Yarra Ranges, Victoria; Australia
- Coordinates: 37°39′18″S 145°30′37″E
- System: Yarra Valley Railway station
- Owner: VicTrack
- Operator: Yarra Valley Railway
- Lines: Yarra Valley Railway; Healesville (former)
- Platforms: 1
- Tracks: 3
- Bus routes: 685 Lilydale to Healesville (via Yarra Glen only)
- Bus operators: McKenzies Bus Lines

Construction
- Structure type: Ground
- Parking: Yes
- Cycle facilities: No
- Accessible: Yes

Other information
- Status: Staffed on operating days
- Station code: HEV
- Website: yvr.org.au (operator)

History
- Opened: 1 March 1889 (line opened); 1902 (station built)
- Closed: 12 September 1980

Services
Preceding station	Heritage railways	Following station
Tarrawarra	Yarra Valley Railway	Terminus

Former services
Preceding station	VicRail	Following station
Tarrawarra towards Lilydale	Healesville line	Terminus
List of closed railway stations in Melbourne
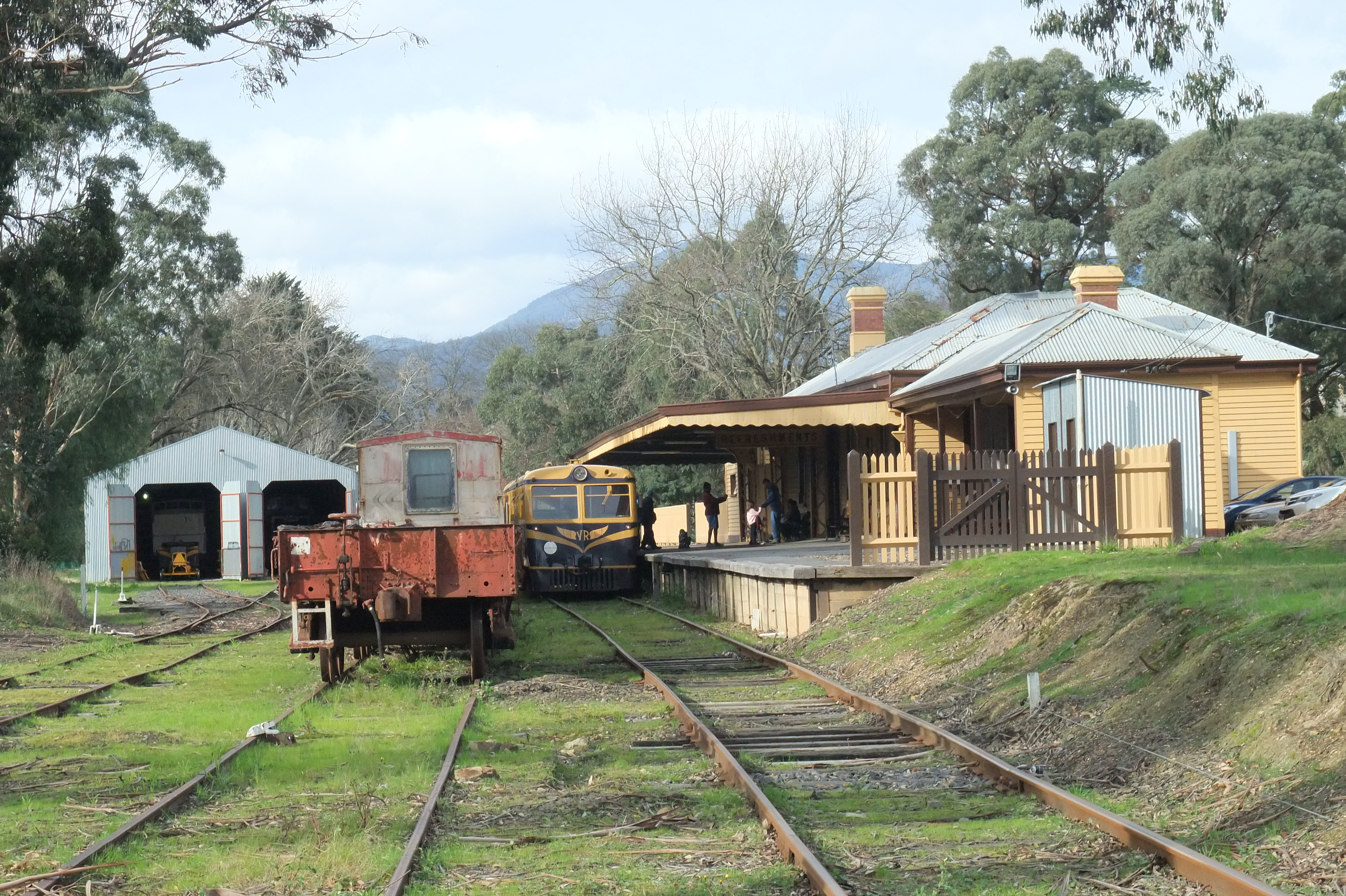
- Railway station and historic rolling stock, in 2014

History
- Built by: F. E. Shillabeer

Site notes
- Material: Timber; corrugated iron; bricks
- Architect: Charles Norman

Victorian Heritage Register
- Official name: Healesville Railway Station Complex
- Type: Registered place
- Designated: 20 August 1982
- Reference no.: H1567
- Heritage overlay no.: HO2
- Category: Transport - Rail

Register of the National Estate
- Official name: Healesville Railway Station and Track to Yarra Glen; Healesville - Lilydale Railway Line
- Type: Defunct register
- Designated: undated
- Reference no.: 102573 and 5692
Location

Healesville is a railway station in Victoria, Australia. Formerly the terminus of the Healesville railway line, it is now the operating base of the Yarra Valley Railway –- a heritage railway operating along the former alignment from here to Yarra Glen. A temporary station was built on the site in 1888–1889 when the railway line was extended from Lilydale to Healesville.

Built in 1903 on the traditional lands of the Wurundjeri people, the railway station complex was added to the Victorian Heritage Register on 20 August 1982 in recognition of its historical and architectural significance; and, on unknown dates, was also added to non-statutory lists by the Victorian branch of the National Trust and the now defunct Register of the National Estate.

== History ==
=== VicRail operation ===
The line from Lilydale to Healesville reached the Yarra Flats in 1888, and Healesville in 1889. It was diverted through Yarra Glen, where a costly bridge, tunnel, and earthworks were put in place to satisfy the interests of local influential landowners. The station at Healesville was originally served by demountable buildings, replaced in 1902 by the current timber building.

The new railhead at Healesville enabled the forests around Toolangi to be opened up and assisted the development of a significant local industry. Tourism also boomed in the district, changing the character of the town with the building of guesthouses and other tourist infrastructure. Coaches took tourists to accommodation houses at Marysville and Alexandra, going via the popular Blacks Spur. Yarra Glen was also a popular destination for day trippers from Melbourne, who visited the race course or the nearby settlement at Christmas Hills.

The Yarra Glen station was built in 1914, with a large passenger waiting area that reflected the substantial holiday traffic carried on the line. The railway trestle bridge at Yarra Glen, when constructed in the 1890s, was criticised as an extravagant example of railways expenditure. It was at that time the longest bridge of this type in Victoria, and designed to divert the line away from the properties of influential landowners. After the Yarra River flooded in 1934 an earthen embankment was constructed along the bridge as a flood mitigation measure. The last steam train on the line ran in 1957; and the Healesville line was cut back to Coldstream in December 1980 and the line and station sat idle for a few years.

=== Tourist operator ===
In 1985, the line partially re-opened to Yarra Glen as part of Yarra Valley Railway, a tourist railway operator based in Healesville. The tourist line opens on weekends, Wednesdays of school holidays, and public holidays. Walker railmotor, RM22, runs approximately 4.5 kilometres (2.8 mi) to near the TarraWarra Estate winery, after travelling through an historic tunnel.

The Yarra Valley Railway aims to restore the line from Healesville to Yarra Glen railway station. The Black Saturday bushfires on 7 February 2009 proved a major setback as the fires destroyed 13 timber trestle bridges between Healesville and Yarra Glen stations. In 2018, the Andrews Labor Government announced A$3.75 million in funding to extend the Yarra Valley Railway line to 14 kilometres (9 mi).

Boom gates were installed at the Healesville-Kinglake Road level crossing in September 2022, along with the reconstruction of the level crossing.

=== Bus services ===
Healesville station is now served by the route 685 bus, which runs between Lilydale and Healesville, and is operated by McKenzie's Tourist Services, under contract to Public Transport Victoria.

== Station description ==
Healesville railway station is an example of a station designed to cater for peak loads at holiday times. The original building is intact. There is evidence of a Down platform and building along the northern alignment of the yard. Other important elements include the steam locomotive sub depot, used in its latter days as a serving point for the rail motor and for the turning of chartered steam locomotives.

The complex consists of a large timber gable roofed station building with extensive passenger waiting facilities, intact toilets and cantilevered verandahs to the platform and roadside waiting areas. Other associated structures include a timber lamp room, a corrugated iron clad goods shed, circular water tower and a turntable. While the station buildings are in poor condition and in urgent need of repair, they remain intact.

== In popular culture ==
Healesville railway station served as the location for the town's station, in the long-running ABC TV serial Bellbird. The Internet Movie Database lists the station as a filming location for the Australian short film Harry's War (1999). The station was used in the railway station scene in John D. Lamond's 1979 "Ozploitation" film, Felicity.

== See also ==
- List of railway stations in Melbourne
- List of places on the Victorian Heritage Register in the Shire of Yarra Ranges
