= Melba Highway =

Highway in Victoria, Australia

Melba Highway Victoria
- Coordinates: 37.211853°S 145.423061°E (North end); 37.721045°S 145.379534°E (South end)

General information
- Type: Highway
- Length: 64.9 km (40 mi)
- Gazetted: October 1913 (as Main Road); May 1983 (as State Highway)
- Route number(s): B300 (1998–present); Entire route (via Yarra Glen bypass)
- Former route number: B300 (1998–2010) (via Yarra Glen); State Route 153 (1986–1998) Entire route (via Yarra Glen)

Major junctions
- North end: Goulburn Valley Highway; Yea, Victoria
- Healesville-Kinglake Road; Healesville–Yarra Glen Road
- South end: Maroondah Highway; Coldstream, Victoria

Location(s)
- Region: Hume, Greater Melbourne
- Major settlements: Glenburn, Dixons Creek, Yarra Glen, Yering

Highway system
- Highways in Australia; National Highway • Freeways in Australia; Highways in Victoria

Melba Highway is a highway that connects the outer eastern suburbs of Melbourne to the town of Yea, in Victoria's Upper Goulburn region. It is named after Dame Nellie Melba, a famed Australian opera singer of the early 20th century, whose former country estate lies at the southern end of the highway in Coldstream.

== Route ==
Melba Highway commences at the intersection of High Street (Goulburn Valley Highway) and Station Street in Yea and heads south as a dual-lane, single-carriageway road, passing through forest and open agricultural land and mostly following the course of Yea River until it reaches Glenburn, where the highway descends down a steep grade to Dixons Creek at the bottom of the Great Dividing Range, through a road junction that links the highway with the nearby towns of Kinglake and Toolangi, a former home of Australian author C. J. Dennis. It continues south and then west along the bypass around Yarra Glen, then continues south, passing through the alluvial plains of the Yarra River and the rich Yarra Valley vineyards, before eventually passing the Melba Estate just before terminating at the intersection with Maroondah Highway in Coldstream.

=== Speed Limits ===
- Coldstream – Yarra Glen 80 km/h
- Yarra Glen 50 km/h
- Yarra Glen – Glenburn via Yarra Glen Bypass 100 km/h
- Glenburn 80 km/h
- Glenburn – Yea 100 km/h
- Yea 60 km/h

== History ==
The passing of the Country Roads Act 1912 through the Parliament of Victoria provided for the establishment of the Country Roads Board (later VicRoads) and their ability to declare Main Roads, taking responsibility for the management, construction and care of the state's major roads from local municipalities. Yarra Glen Road was declared a Main Road, from the intersection with Main Healesville Road in Coldstream to Yarra Glen, on 20 October 1913, and Yea-Glenburn Road from Yea to Glenburn was declared a Main Road on 30 September 1914. The remainder of the road was the responsibility of the Shires of Yea and Healesville. The Shire of Yea in particular found maintenance of this and other roads within its boundaries challenging and financially straining, as a consequence of the hilly terrain, many bridges, and damage caused by periodic flooding. By the 1970s, the road carried a "constant heavy stream of 'through traffic'" which further exacerbated the Shire's maintenance difficulties without contributing any revenue.

The passing of the Country Roads Act 1958 (itself an evolution from the original Highways and Vehicles Act 1924) provided for the declaration of State Highways, roads two-thirds financed by the state government through the Country Roads Board. However, it was not until 9 May 1983 that the entire route from Yea to Coldstream via Yarra Glen was declared a State Highway, to be known as the Melba Highway, subsuming the original declarations of Yarra Glen Road and Yea-Glenburn Road as Main Roads. Before this declaration, the road were also referred to as Yarra Glen-Yea Road.

Melba Highway was signed as State Route 153 between Yea and Coldstream in 1986; with Victoria's conversion to the newer alphanumeric system in the late 1990s this was replaced with route B300.

The passing of the Road Management Act 2004 granted the responsibility of overall management and development of Victoria's major arterial roads to VicRoads: in 2004, VicRoads re-declared Melba Highway (Arterial #6300) between Yea and Coldstream.

The Yarra Glen bypass which opened in May 2010 diverts trucks and other through vehicles. Works also saw the Bell Street/Melba Highway roundabout created along with a new level crossing through the roundabout for the Yarra Valley Railway.

== Major Intersections and Towns ==
LGA	Location	km	mi	Destinations	Notes
Murrindindi	Yea	0.0	0.0	Goulburn Valley Highway (B340 west, B300/B340 east) – Seymour, Alexandra, Mansfield	Northern terminus of highway Route B300 continues east along Goulburn Valley Highway
Yea River		21.2	13.2	Bridge name unknown	
Murrindindi	Castella	40.0	24.9	Healesville–Kinglake Road (C724 east) – Healesville	Concurrency with route C724
Murrindindi	Castella	40.1	24.9	Healesville–Kinglake Road (C724 west) – Kinglake	Concurrency with route C724
Yarra Ranges	Yarra Glen	54.3	33.7	Bell Street (C731) – Yarra Glen, Eltham	Former alignment before Yarra Glen bypass built
Yarra Ranges	Yarra Glen	55.6	34.5	Healesville–Yarra Glen Road (C726 east) – Healesville	Concurrency with route C726
Yarra Ranges	Yarra Glen	57.6	35.8	Bell Street (C726 west) – Yarra Glen, Eltham	Concurrency with route C726
Yarra Ranges	Yarra Glen	57.6	35.8	Yarra Valley tourist railway line	
Yarra River		57.8	35.9	Vasey Houghton Bridge	
Yarra Ranges	Coldstream	64.9	40.3	Maroondah Highway (B300 south, B360 east) – Melbourne, Healesville, Alexandra	Southern terminus of highway Route B300 continues south along Maroondah Highway
1.000 mi = 1.609 km; 1.000 km = 0.621 mi: Concurrency terminus; Route transition

== See also ==
- Highways in Australia
- Highways in Victoria
