= Healesville railway line =

Partially closed railway line in Melbourne, Australia

Healesville

Overview
- Status: Closed line – Yarra Valley Railway, Yarra Valley Trail
- Owner: Victorian Railways (VR) (1888–1974); VR as VicRail (1974–1983); MTA (The Met) (1983–1989); PTC (The Met) (1989–1991)
- Locale: Melbourne, Victoria, Australia
- Termini: Lilydale; Healesville
- Continues from: Lilydale
- Connecting lines: Lilydale, Warburton lines, Yarra Valley Railway
- Stations: 2 current stations; 4 former stations; 1 former siding

Service
- Type: Former Melbourne suburban service
- Operators: Victorian Railways (VR) (1888–1974); VR as VicRail (1974–1983); MTA (The Met) (1983–1989); PTC (The Met) (1989–1991)

History
- Work began: 15 May 1888
- Opened: Lilydale to Yarra Glen on 15 May 1888; Yarra Glen to Healesville on 1 March 1889
- Completed: 1 March 1889
- Closed: Coldstream to Healesville on 15 March 1981; Lilydale to Coldstream on 10 December 1991

Technical
- Line length: 24.773 km (15.393 mi)
- Num of tracks: Single track
- Track gauge: 1,600 mm (5 ft 3 in)

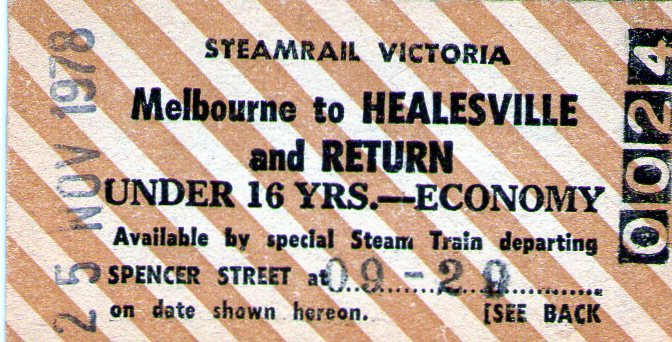
Melbourne–Healesville excursion rail ticket, 1978

The Healesville railway line, in Melbourne, Australia, was the non-electrified continuation of the suburban Lilydale line, extending into the Yarra Valley. The line was closed in the 1980s, but a heritage railway group, the Yarra Valley Railway, is using the section of the line between Yarra Glen and Healesville.

== History ==
The Lilydale line was extended to Yarra Flats (now known as Yarra Glen) on 15 May 1888, with intermediate stations at Coldstream and Yering. Part of the route included a long timber viaduct near[Yarra Glen, with 502 openings, spanning the Yarra River and the adjacent flood plain. The extension of the line from Yarra Glen to Healesville on 1 March 1889 required a 1 in 40 climb into a 154.4 metre-long tunnel, with a corresponding descent at nearly the same grade. Opened at the same time was the intermediate station of Tarrawarra.

Traffic on the line included timber, livestock, milk and dairy products. Early timetables included regular goods services specifically for transporting milk.

The last regular steam passenger service was in August 1964. From that time until the closure of the line in 1980, passenger services were run using diesel rail motors. On 9 December 1980, all services were withdrawn, except for some goods services to Coldstream. That section of the line was officially closed to all traffic on 10 March 1983.

Around 2003, the uncontrolled level crossings at Beresford Road and Macintyre Lane were effectively removed by rebuilding the roads at a slightly raised level, burying the tracks beneath the bitumen. That was advantageous for Invicta Bus Services, the depot of which was situated near the Beresford Road crossing, because buses were formerly required to come to a complete stop at uncontrolled level crossings, even if the rail line was disused.

On 7 February 2009, most of the low-level trestle bridges, which were a major part of the viaduct crossing the Yarra River and its floodplain, were destroyed in the Black Saturday bushfires.

== Services ==
Following the closure of the rail service, the Healesville line ran both passenger and freight services. The passenger services generally ran as a shuttle between Lilydale and Healesville stations. The freight services transported local timber, live-stock, and dairy products. Trains running on the line had originally included a daily evening "mixed milk and passenger train", and a single milk train on Sundays.

Prior to electrification reaching Lilydale in November 1925, the line was operated by A2 class locomotives. After that, passenger trains on the Healesville and Warburton lines were run by two electric motor carriages from Melbourne to Lilydale, where a K or D3 class steam loco took the carriages onto Healesville and Warburton.

On 28 October 1957, the steam hauled, seven-day-a-week service was replaced by a 153hp Walker railmotor operating four services a day each way, with three on weekends. Prior to that, services were limited to three each way on weekdays and two each way on weekends. On 21 April 1958, the Victorian Education Department subsidised trains for school children, using a Walker railcar. That service crossed with other services at Yarra Glen until 1972.

== Trains operating on the line ==
Services to Healesville mostly departed from Lilydale. Throughout its existence many steam and diesel locomotives and railcars operated on the Healesville line.

- Old R class steam locomotives (1889–)
- Dclass steam locomotives (1908–)

By 1913 all classes of locomotives were permitted on the line but, by 1918, all classes but the C-class were allowed.

- A2 locomotives (ceased by 1925)
- J, K and D3 steam locomotives (ceased regular service in 1964).
- T and B class diesels (1952–1962).
- Y class diesel (until the line's official closure)
- Walker railmotor (1957–1978).
- DERM 62 (1978–1979)
- DERM 58 (1979–1980)

In the lead-up to the closure of the line, the DERM (Diesel-Electric Rail Motor) was only permitted a maximum speed on 30 km/h, and no locomotive-hauled passenger trains were allowed. Only Y class diesels could haul the freight services. That was due to the deterioration of the track condition, which resulted in the derailment of T401 on 5 August 1980.

== Current status ==
Note: In February 2026, the Yarra Valley Railway suspended its passenger services to allow extensive track work to be done, to bring the line up to a standard suitable for the running trains other than just railmotors. The 13 wooden bridges destroyed by the Black Saturday in 2009 have already been replaced.

The Yarra Valley Railway runs a Walker railmotor from Healesville to the Tarrawarra Winery, crossing the Watts River, under the Donovans Road overbridge and through the tunnel.

Railmotor operations commenced using restored 153 hp Walker railmotor RM22 being accredited to run a passenger train on the line as of 5 March 2010. It ran its first paying passenger run since restored on 7 March with the seats being auctioned in singles, doubles and triples to the exhibitors of the model railway show.

The tourist railway has a number of locomotives, including two Victorian Railways J class steam engines, a T class diesel-electric locomotive, a W class diesel-hydraulic locomotive, a Y Class diesel, a 153 hp Walker Rail motor, and a diesel electric rail motor (DERM).

=== Yarra Valley Trail ===
The Yarra Valley Trail is being progressively constructed along the disused alignment of the railway, including the reconstruction of bridges. Between Yarra Glen to Healesville, the trail will run parallel to the existing rail track. Future connections have been proposed to link the Healesville trail to the Warburton rail trails, forming a loop. Stage 1A of the rail trail opened between Lilydale and Yering in February 2020.

== Station histories ==
Station	Opened	Closed	Age	Notes
Lilydale	1 December 1882		143 years	
Blacks Siding	29 May 1911	10 May 1946	34 years	
Coldstream	15 May 1888	1992	104 years	
Yering	15 May 1888	15 March 1981	92 years	
Yarra Glen	15 May 1888	9 December 1980	92 years	Formerly Yarra Flats
Yarra Glen	1985	1989	4 years	Tourist service
Yarra Glen	1993	1994	12 months	Tourist service
Tarrawarra	15 May 1889	15 March 1981	91 years	
Tarrawarra	1988	1989	12 months	Tourist service
Tarrawarra	1992	1994	24 months	Tourist service
Healesville	1 March 1889	12 September 1980	91 years	
Healesville	1990		36 years	Tourist service

== See also ==
- Yarra Valley Railway
