= Yering =

- Town
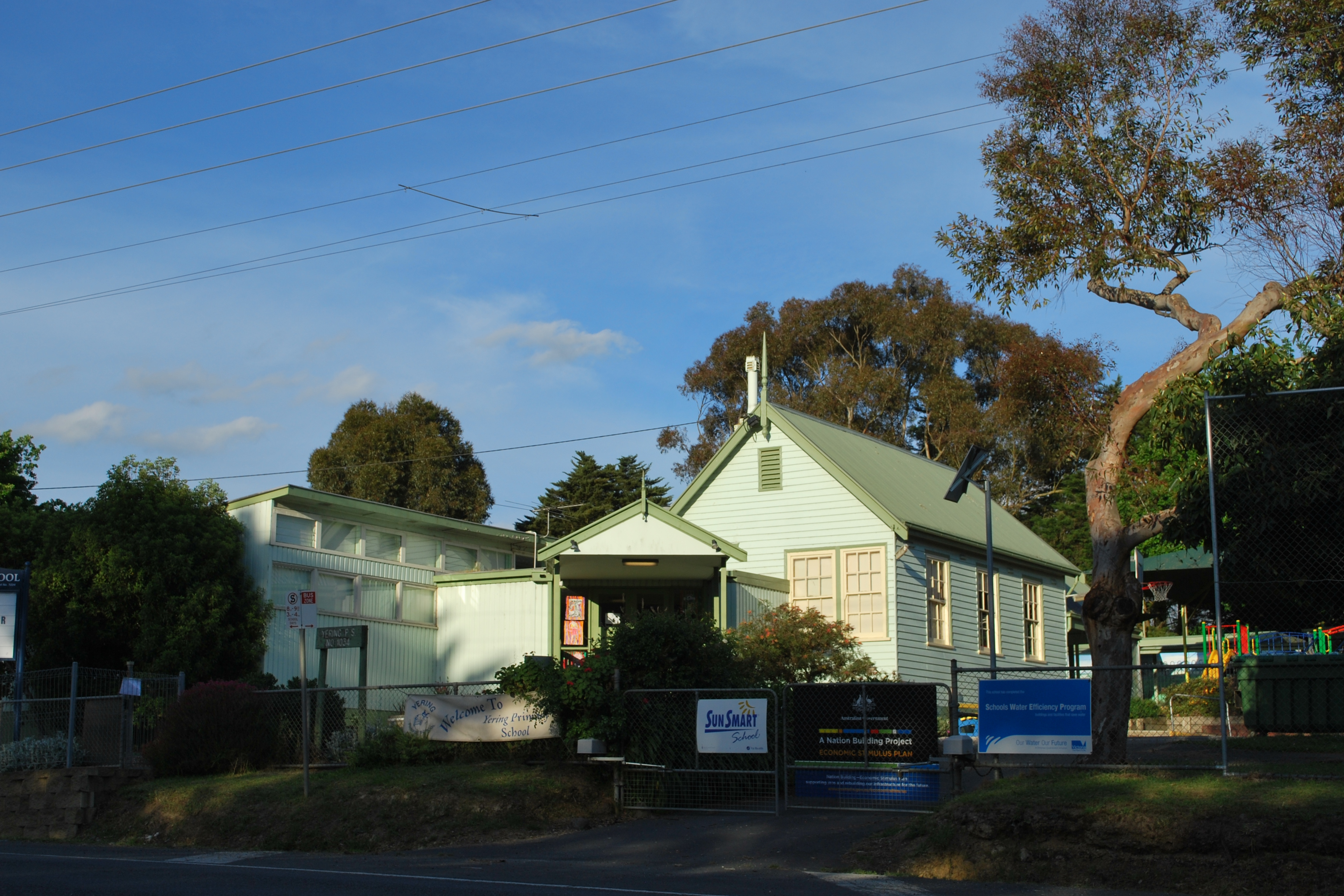
- Yering Primary School

- Coordinates: 37.706°S 145.382°E
- Country: Australia
- State: Victoria
- LGA: Shire of Yarra Ranges
- Location: 47 km (29 mi) from Melbourne; 10 km (6.2 mi) from Lilydale
- Established: 1845

Government
  - State electorate: Evelyn
  - Federal division: Casey
- Elevation: 152 m (499 ft)

Population
  - Total: 138 (2021 census)
- Postcode: 3770
Localities around Yering
Christmas Hills	Yarra Glen	Tarrawarra
Bend of Islands	Yering	Coldstream
Christmas Hills	Coldstream	Gruyere

Yering is a town in Victoria, Australia, 38 km north-east from Melbourne's central business district, located within the Shire of Yarra Ranges local government area. Yering recorded a population of 138 at the 2021 census.

Yering was home to one of Victoria's first wineries.

== History ==
In 1837, brothers William, Donald and James Ryrie, accompanied by four convict stockmen, set out from the Monaro region of New South Wales driving 250 head of stock, settling in the Yarra Valley at Yering, which was the Indigenous name for the local area. They also brought wines with them, and when visitors came to the property, they were treated to wine labelled by Donald Ryrie (his brothers having meanwhile returned to New South Wales) as "Chateau Yering" with ironic overstatement.

By the 1850s, the property had been acquired by two immigrant families from Neuchâtel, Switzerland—the de Castella and de Pury families, who founded two other wineries on the property, Yeringberg and St Hubert's. All three won Victorian and international awards, including "Best Victorian Vineyard" in 1861 and, in 1889, at the Paris Exhibition, Yering was awarded the only "Grand Prix" to a winery outside the Northern Hemisphere.

Post Offices opened as St Huberts on 1 January 1874 (renamed Yeringberg in 1890 and closing in 1942), Yering on 1 December 1884 (closing 1893), and Yering R. S. (for Railway Station) on 10 April 1890 (renamed Yering about 1915).

The railway arrived in 1888.

The 1890s depression saw table wines decline in popularity and the land, for cattle-grazing and dairying purposes, become more valuable than the vines. Paul de Castella sold Chateau Yering in 1896. The area became the centre of a modern revival of Yarra Valley winemaking in the 1960s, with the original wineries coming back into production and many others established.

=== Heritage listing ===
The following place in Yering is listed on the Victorian Heritage Register:

- Yeringberg winery and stables, 810–812 Maroondah Highway

== Present day ==
The original 1854 mansion on Melba Highway built by Paul de Castella in 1854 from local hand-made bricks and marble and cedar brought overland from New South Wales, is open today with some alterations as the Chateau Yering Historic House/Hotel. Today the original dining room is a restaurant.

Yarra Valley Dairy, with 500 cattle and a range of cheeses, is located just off Melba Highway.

St Hubert's, Domaine Chandon and Yeringberg are located to the east in neighbouring Coldstream. Lilydale Airport is located on McIntyre Lane. Also in Yering is Yering Range Vineyard and Windsor Park Equine Centre, a 247 hectare purpose-built horse agistment property. The Yering Gorge has some unique flora and is home to many native fauna species.

Since 2001 Yering Station has hosted the annual Yering Station Sculpture Awards. Finalist artworks are placed around the Yering Station property and the adjoining historical gardens of Chateau Yering. Previous finalists include Alex Sanson, Lloyd Godman, Jo Lane, and Csongvay Blackwood.

== Schools ==
- Yering Primary School

== See also ==
- Yering railway station
