= Yarra Glen =

- Town
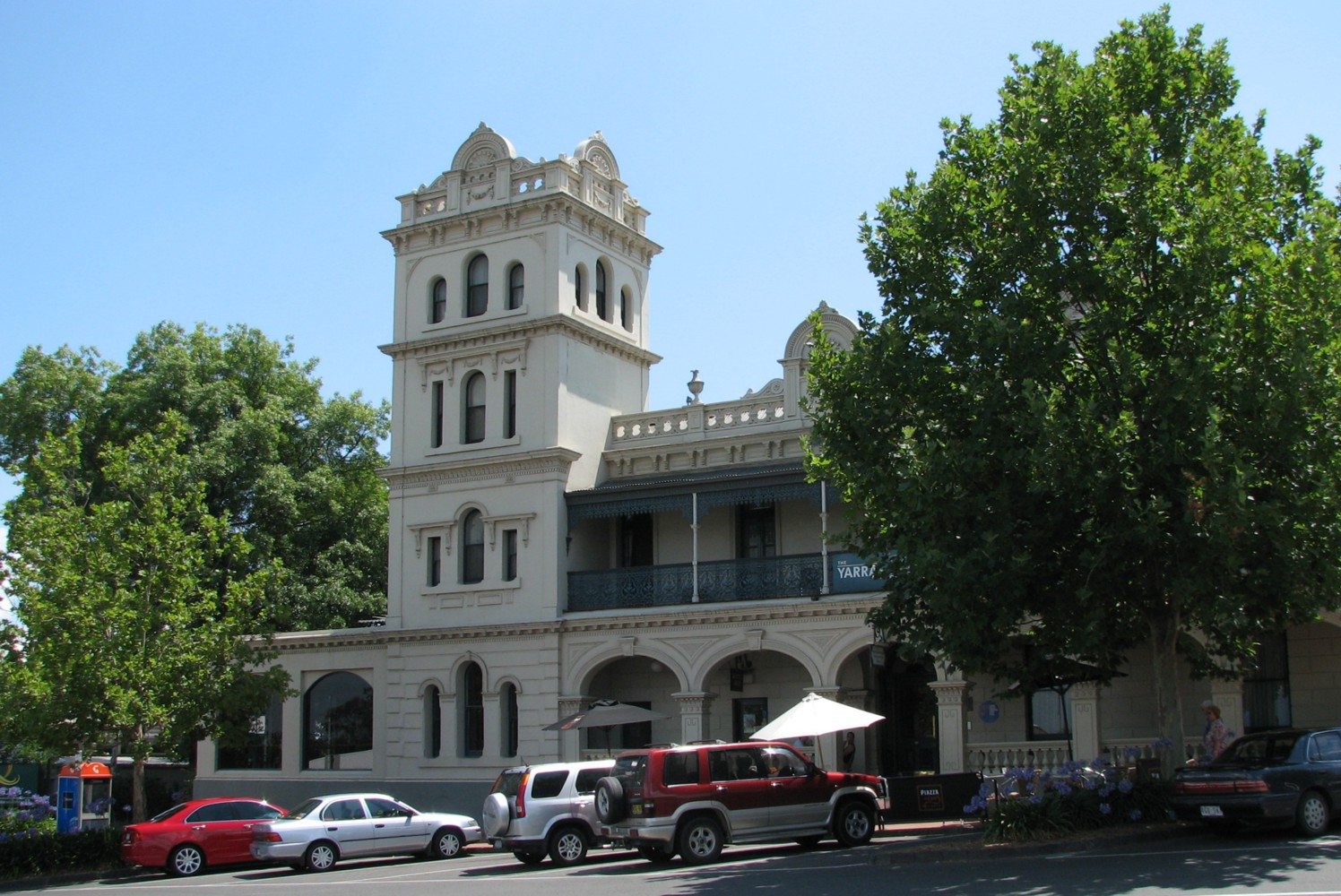
- Grand Hotel

- Interactive map of Yarra Glen
- Coordinates: 37°38′56″S 145°22′19″E
- Country: Australia
- State: Victoria
- LGA: Shire of Yarra Ranges
- Location: 55 km (34 mi) NE of Melbourne CBD; 14 km (8.7 mi) N of Lilydale; 14 km (8.7 mi) W of Healesville

Government
  - State electorate: Eildon
  - Federal division: Casey

Area
  - Total: 35.1 km^{2} (13.6 sq mi)
- Elevation: 99 m (325 ft)

Population
  - Total: 3,012 (2021 census)
  - Density: 85.81/km^{2} (222.3/sq mi)
- Postcode: 3775
Localities around Yarra Glen
| Christmas Hills | Steels Creek | Dixons Creek |
| Christmas Hills | Yarra Glen | Tarrawarra |
| Christmas Hills | Yering | Coldstream |

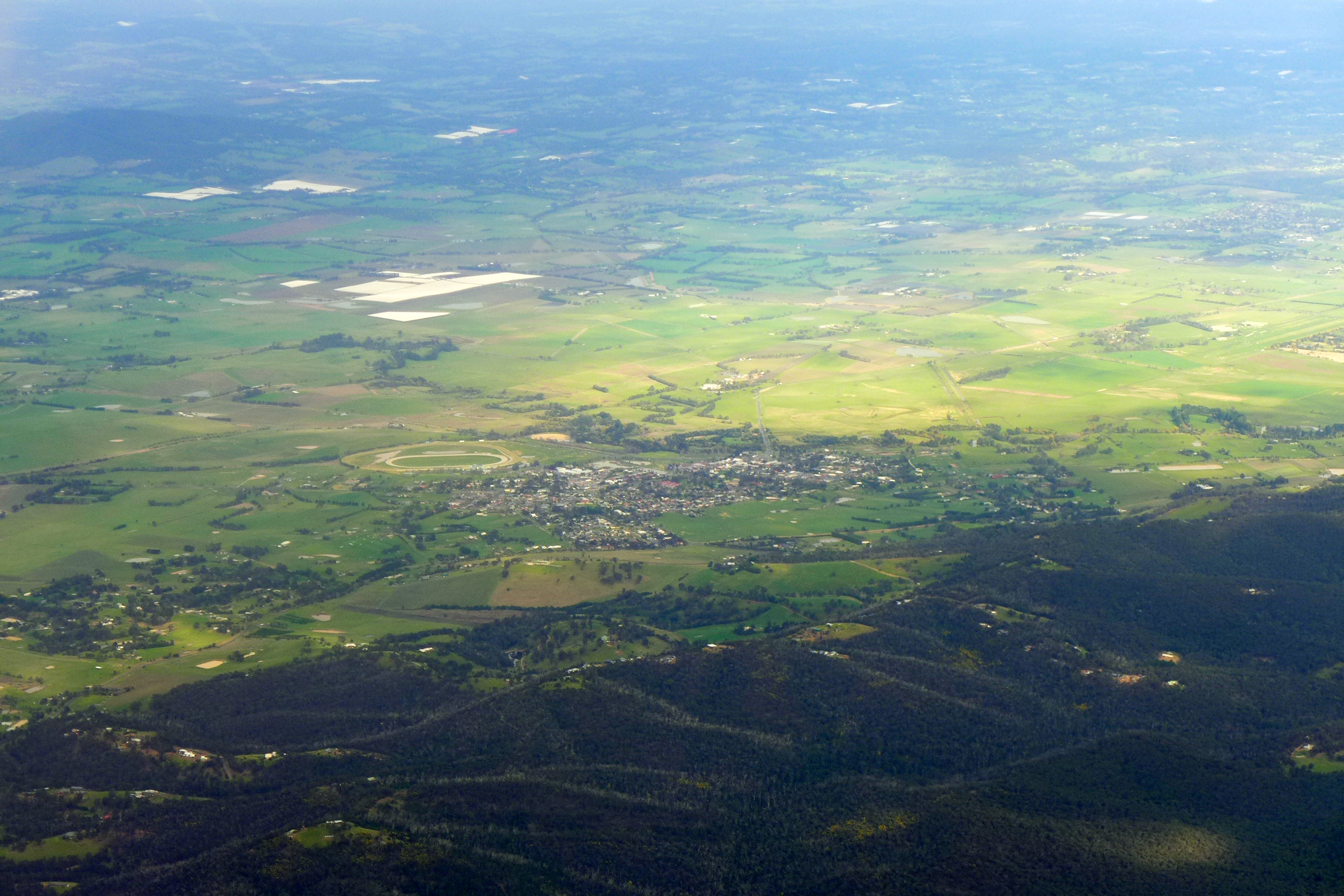
Aerial view of Yarra Glen

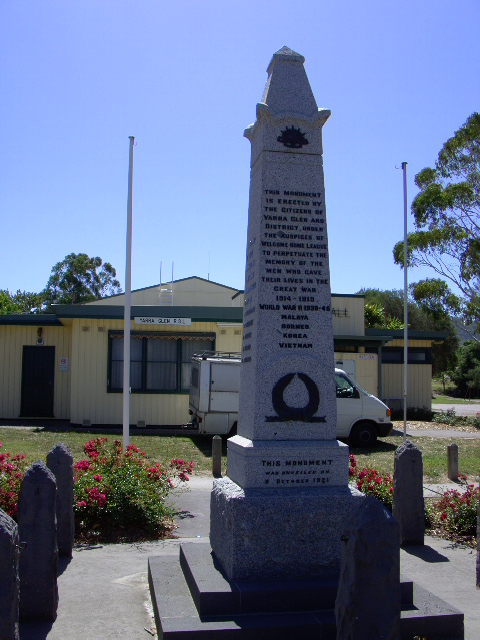
War memorial and hall

Yarra Glen is a town in Victoria, Australia, 55 km north-east from Melbourne's central business district, located within the Shire of Yarra Ranges local government area. Yarra Glen recorded a population of 3,012 at the 2021 census.

== History ==
The Ryrie brothers (William, James and Donald) were the first Europeans to settle in the area, when they established the 17,000-hectare (43,000-acre) Yering run in 1837 after droving their cattle from NSW. The brothers planted the first grape vines in the Yarra Valley in 1838 and produced their first wine in 1845. Joseph Furphy, often regarded as the father of the Australian novel, was born on the station in 1843.

The Post Office opened on 11 January 1861 as Yarra Flats and was renamed Yarra Glen in 1889 when the railway arrived.

The now National Trust-listed Yarra Glen Grand Hotel was established in 1888. Its four-storey Italianate tower was added subsequent to the construction of the original hotel building.

The Black Friday fires of 1939 badly damaged the area around Yarra Glen, as did the fires of 2009.

=== Heritage listings ===
The following places in Yarra Glen are listed on the Victorian Heritage Register:

- Gulf Station, 1029 Melba Highway
  - Prefabricated timber house, located at the Gulf Station

== Sport ==
The town has an Australian Rules football team, Yarra Glen Football Club that competes in the Yarra Valley Mountain District Football League.

Yarra Glen has a horse racing club, Yarra Valley Racing, which schedules around nine race meetings a year including the Yarra Glen Cup meeting in March.

Yarra Valley Harness Racing Club conducts regular meetings at its racetrack in the town.

== See also ==
- Yarra Glen railway station
