= Coldstream, Victoria =

Coldstream
- Town
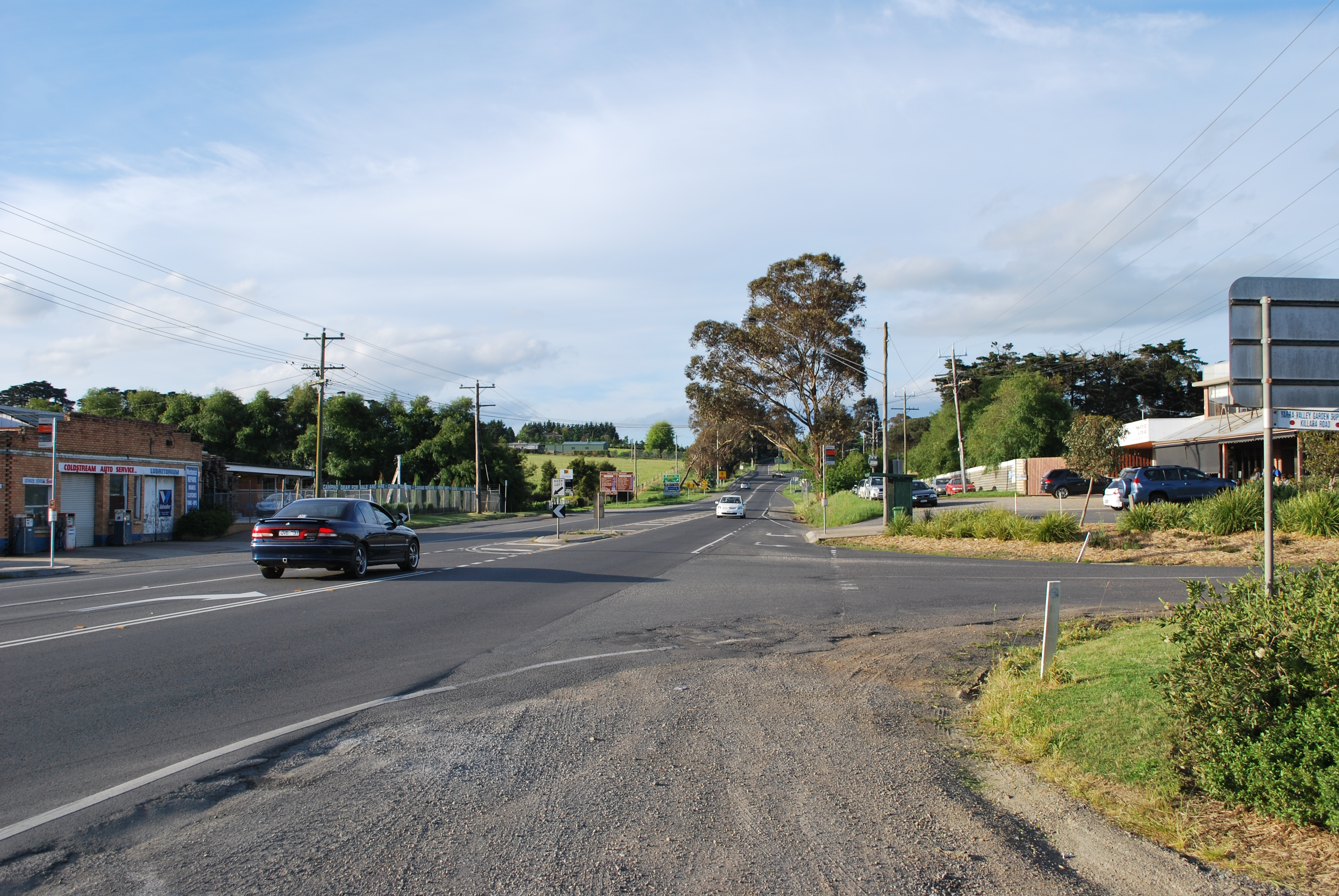
- Coldstream

- Interactive map of Coldstream
- Coordinates: 37.734°S 145.383°E
- Country: Australia
- State: Victoria
- City: Melbourne
- LGA: Shire of Yarra Ranges
- Location: 41 km (25 mi) from Melbourne; 6 km (3.7 mi) from Lilydale

Government
  - State electorate: Evelyn
  - Federal division: Casey
- Elevation: 83 m (272 ft)

Population
  - Total: 2,199 (SAL 2021)
- Postcode: 3770
- Mean max temp: 20.5 °C (68.9 °F)
- Mean min temp: 7.6 °C (45.7 °F)
- Annual rainfall: 756.8 mm (29.80 in)
Localities around Coldstream
Yering	Yarra Glen	Healesville
Bend of Islands	Coldstream	Gruyere
Chirnside Park	Lilydale	Wandin North

Coldstream is a town in the Shire of Yarra Ranges, Victoria, Australia, located in Greater Melbourne beyond the Melbourne metropolitan area Urban Growth Boundary. Coldstream is located 36 km north-east from Melbourne's central business district. Coldstream recorded a population of 2,199 at the 2021 census.

== History ==
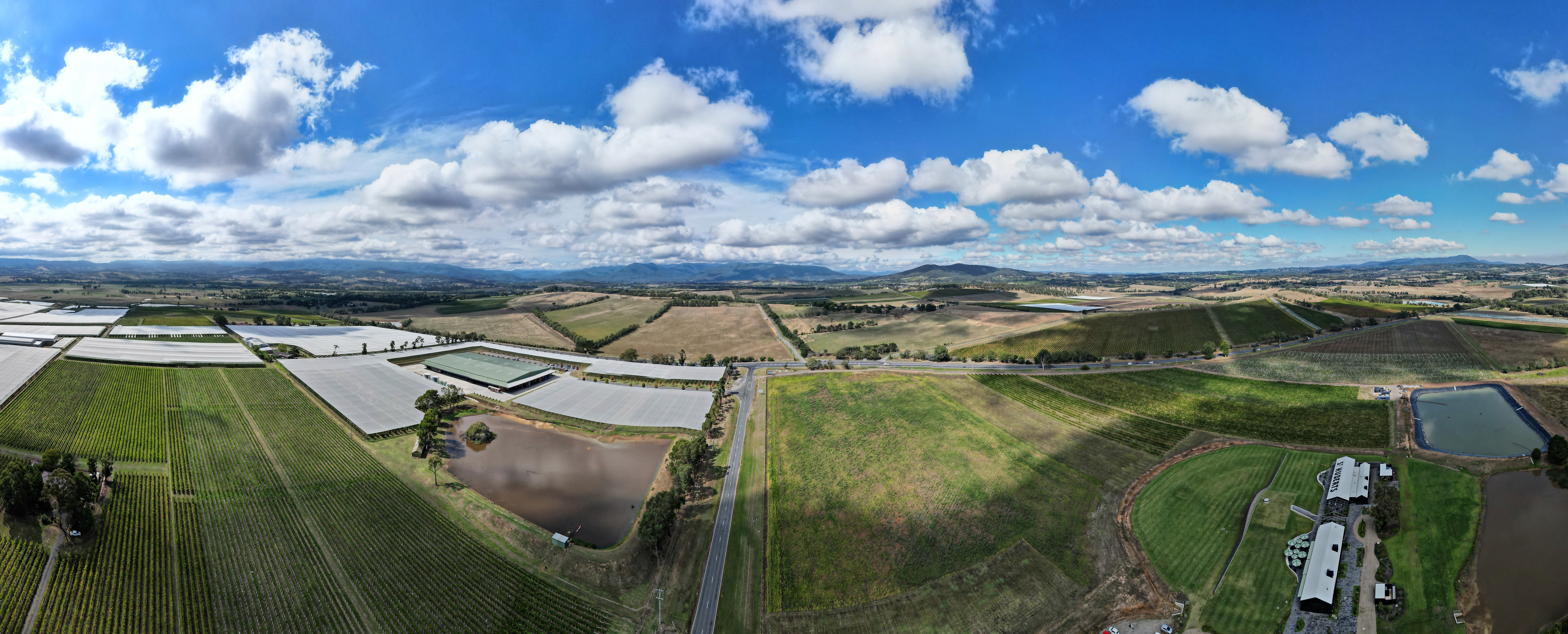
Aerial panorama of Coldstream and the Great Dividing Range on the horizon, 2023

The township developed around the railway station after the railway arrived in 1888. The Post Office opened on 7 February 1889. Prior to that the locality was known as "The Lodge".

=== Heritage listings ===
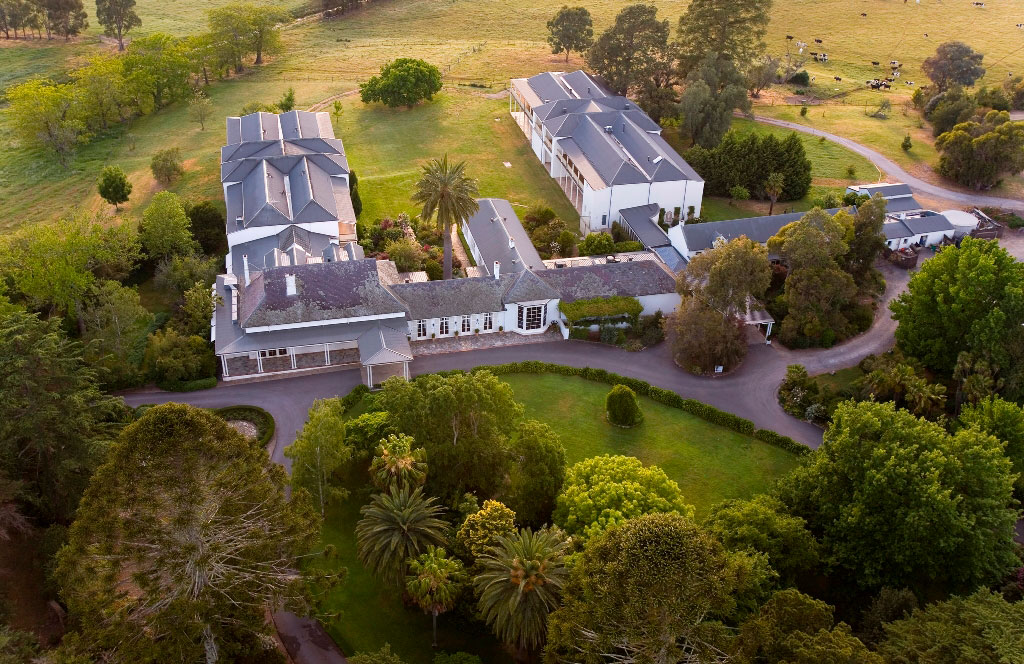
Aerial view of Chateau Yering, redeveloped as a luxury hotel, 2019

The following places in Coldsteam are listed on the Victorian Heritage Register:

- Chateau Yering, also known as the Yering homestead, 38–42 Melba Highway
- Coombe Cottage, at the junction of the Melba and Maroondah highways, the Australian home of Dame Nellie Melba from 1909 to 1931

== Today ==
Coldstream has a local primary school, community centre, landfill, and several farms.

It had a railway station that closed to passengers in 1983, but was used for freight purposes up until 1992 when it closed after the buildings were destroyed by fire.

The Bureau of Meteorology operates an automatic weather station at Coldstream Airfield. A private automatic weather station is also maintained on Coldstream Estate.

=== Commerce ===
Coldstream is the site of a few commercial interests, including Coldstream Timber & Hardware, Coldstream Brewery and the Chandon Australia winery, sister to Domaine Chandon California.

=== Airport ===
Coldstream Airport is owned by the Doake family and has been in operation since the early 1960s.

It is home to:

- Coldstream Flying School, operated by Yarra Valley Flight Training
- The Coldstream Flyers Club
- Private aircraft

=== Fire brigade ===
Coldstream has an active CFA (Country Fire Authority) volunteer fire brigade established after the serious fires of 1962. This was a name change from the Lilydale Rural Fire Brigade originally established in 1939 as the Lilydale Bushfire Brigade, changing its name in 1945 on the establishment of the CFA (Country Fire Authority).

== Population ==
In the 2016 Census, there were 2,164 people in Coldstream. 83.3% of people were born in Australia. The next most common country of birth was England at 4.9%. 91.4% of people spoke only English at home. The most common responses for religion were No Religion 42.5%, Catholic 20.5% and Anglican 12.1%.

== Climate ==
Coldstream has an oceanic climate that is transitional with the inland climates of southern Victoria, resulting in higher summer daytime temperatures than on the Victorian coastline. Averages even out due to lower overnight temperatures, where Coldstream can get close to freezing even in the midst of summer. Rainfall peaks in late winter and spring.

Climate data for Coldstream (1994−2025)
Month	Jan	Feb	Mar	Apr	May	Jun	Jul	Aug	Sep	Oct	Nov	Dec	Year
Record high °C (°F)	43.4 (110.1)	44.8 (112.6)	39.9 (103.8)	33.3 (91.9)	26.7 (80.1)	22.0 (71.6)	22.5 (72.5)	23.3 (73.9)	29.7 (85.5)	34.0 (93.2)	38.2 (100.8)	41.6 (106.9)	44.8 (112.6)
Mean daily maximum °C (°F)	28.1 (82.6)	27.7 (81.9)	25.4 (77.7)	20.7 (69.3)	16.6 (61.9)	14.0 (57.2)	13.4 (56.1)	14.9 (58.8)	17.3 (63.1)	19.8 (67.6)	22.8 (73.0)	25.4 (77.7)	20.5 (68.9)
Mean daily minimum °C (°F)	12.1 (53.8)	11.9 (53.4)	10.0 (50.0)	7.2 (45.0)	5.5 (41.9)	4.0 (39.2)	4.0 (39.2)	4.5 (40.1)	5.6 (42.1)	6.8 (44.2)	9.0 (48.2)	10.0 (50.0)	7.6 (45.6)
Record low °C (°F)	0.9 (33.6)	2.4 (36.3)	−1.7 (28.9)	−3.3 (26.1)	−5.5 (22.1)	−5.8 (21.6)	−5.3 (22.5)	−5.8 (21.6)	−3.6 (25.5)	−3.8 (25.2)	−0.8 (30.6)	0.4 (32.7)	−5.8 (21.6)
Average precipitation mm (inches)	54.1 (2.13)	46.5 (1.83)	48.3 (1.90)	65.6 (2.58)	67.6 (2.66)	67.3 (2.65)	62.5 (2.46)	70.9 (2.79)	68.1 (2.68)	75.4 (2.97)	72.5 (2.85)	59.1 (2.33)	756.8 (29.80)
Average precipitation days (≥ 0.2 mm)	8.9	6.8	8.7	12.4	15.6	17.8	18.4	18.5	15.1	13.9	12.4	10.5	159.0
Average afternoon relative humidity (%)	46	45	46	56	65	71	70	64	58	55	53	49	57

== Sport ==
The town has an Australian Rules football team, the Coldstream Cougars, competing in the Eastern Football League.

Coldstream also has a standalone Netball club.

== See also ==
- Coldstream railway station, Melbourne
