= Geography of the Yarra River =

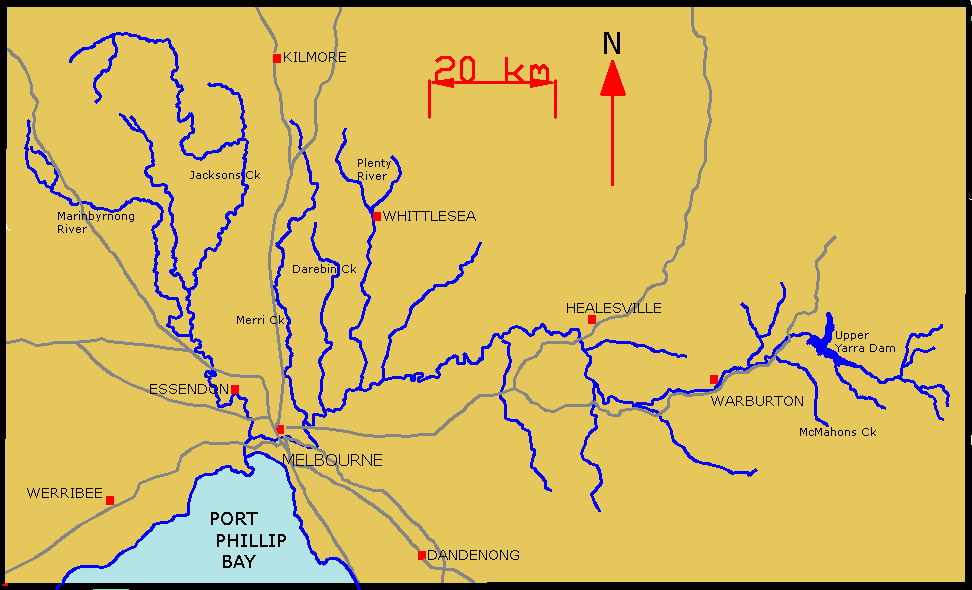
Map of Yarra River and its tributaries

The Yarra River is a river in East-Central Victoria, Australia that flows through the city of Melbourne. This article contains explanations and lists of the river's tributaries and other geographic features. The river flows atop layers of silt that built up within an ancient river valley around 10,000-15,000 years ago.

The river's major tributaries are the Plenty River, Merri Creek, Darebin Creek, Diamond Creek, Gardiners Creek, Mullum Mullum Creek and the Moonee Ponds Creek. It hosts a wide range of geographic features including; bends, rapids, lakes, islands, floodplains, billabongs, wetlands, etc. Most features have been named after translated Woiwurrung phrases or have European, particularly British, origins.

The Yarra River has two other names "the upside down river" and "Birrarung". The Yarra was for say nicknamed the upside down river because of the way some of it looked. Birrarung was the first name that the Indigenous Australians gave it.

== Tributaries ==
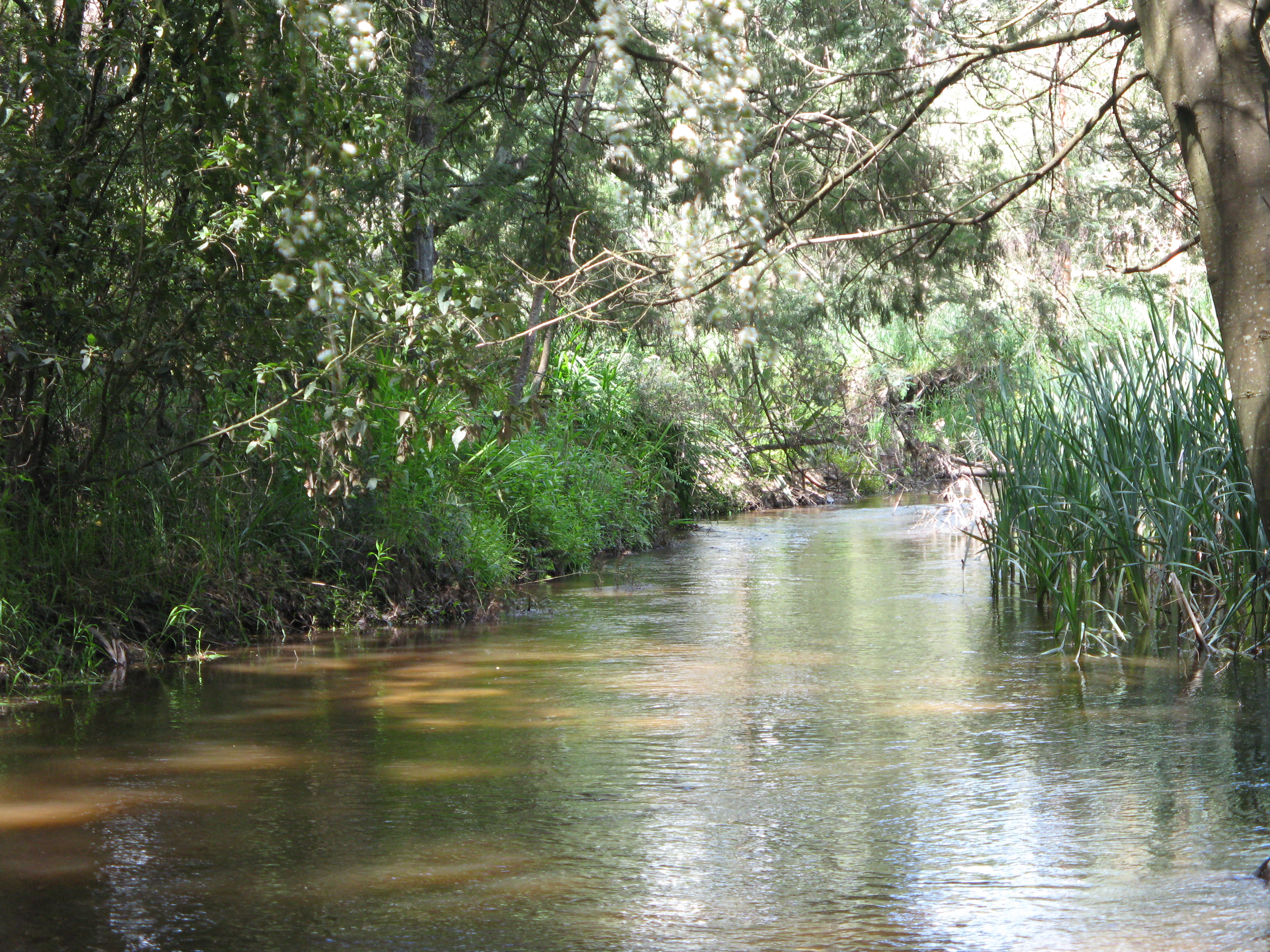
The Little Yarra River at Yarra Junction, 2009

The Yarra River has about 50 named tributaries; 6 rivers, 42 creeks and 2 gullies. At its most easterly point, it is fed by many small unnamed creeks and streams that begin in the Yarra Ranges within the Yarra Ranges National Park, which are sometimes fed by snowfalls. Below is a list of its tributaries (from downstream to upstream):

Rivers of the Yarra River basin
| Catchment river | | | | | | | Elevation at confluence | River mouth | Coordinates | River length |
| | Tributary | | | | | | Elevation at confluence | River mouth | Coordinates | River length |
| | | Tributary | | | | | Elevation at confluence | River mouth | Coordinates | River length |
| | | | Tributary | | | | Elevation at confluence | River mouth | Coordinates | River length |
| | | | | Tributary | | | Elevation at confluence | River mouth | Coordinates | River length |
| | | | | | Tributary | | Elevation at confluence | River mouth | Coordinates | River length |
| | | | | | | Tributary | Elevation at confluence | | Coordinates | River length |
|---|---|---|---|---|---|---|---|---|---|---|
| Yarra River | | | | | | | 0 m (0 ft) | Hobsons Bay, Port Phillip | 37°51′7″S 144°54′30″E | 242 km (150 mi) |
| | Stony Creek | | | | | | 0 m (0 ft) | Yarra | | circa 5 km (3 mi) |
| | Maribyrnong River | | | | | | 1 m (3 ft 3 in) | Yarra | 37°45′19″S 144°50′57″E | 39 km (24 mi) |
| | | Steele Creek | | | | | 5 m (16 ft) | Maribyrnong | | 8 km (5 mi) |
| | | Taylors Creek | | | | | 20 m (66 ft) | Maribyrnong | | 13 km (8 mi) |
| | | Jackson Creek | | | | | 42 m (138 ft) | Maribyrnong | | 71 km (44 mi) |
| | | | Longview Creek | | | | 270 m (890 ft) | Jackson | | 8 km (5 mi) |
| | | | Riddells Creek | | | | 296 m (971 ft) | Jackson | | 15 km (9 mi) |
| | | Deep Creek | | | | | 42 m (138 ft) | Maribyrnong | | 128 km (80 mi) |
| | | | Konagaderra Creek | | | | 164 m (538 ft) | Deep | 37°29′36″S 144°50′27″E | 17 km (11 mi) |
| | | | Boyd Creek | | | | 243 m (797 ft) | Deep | | 12 km (7 mi) |
| | | | | Lintons Creek | | | 277 m (909 ft) | Boyd | | 11 km (7 mi) |
| | | | | No 3 Creek | | | 313 m (1,027 ft) | Boyd | | 13 km (8 mi) |
| | | | Emu Creek | | | | 270 m (890 ft) | Deep | | 8 km (5 mi) |
| | | | | Bolinda (Emu) Creek | | | 282 m (925 ft) | Emu | | 9 km (6 mi) |
| | | | | | Bolinda Creek | | 340 m (1,120 ft) | Bolinda (Emu) | | 9 km (6 mi) |
| | | | | | | Sandy Creek | 380 m (1,250 ft) | Bolinda | | 9 km (6 mi) |
| | Moonee Ponds Creek | | | | | | 1 m (3 ft 3 in) | Yarra | 37°45′39″S 144°55′59″E | 31 km (19 mi) |
| | Kooyong Koot Creek (Gardiners Creek) | | | | | | 12 m (39 ft) | Yarra | 37°52′18″S 145°05′23″E | 17 km (11 mi) |
| | Merri Creek | | | | | | 14 m (46 ft) | Yarra | 37°40′01″S 144°58′35″E | 69 km (43 mi) |
| | Darebin Creek | | | | | | 18 m (59 ft) | Yarra | 37°39′32″S 145°02′08″E | 43 km (27 mi) |
| | Glass Creek | | | | | | | Yarra | | |
| | Koonung Koonung Creek | | | | | | 16 m (52 ft) | Yarra | 37°47′11″S 145°06′16″E | 11 km (7 mi) |
| | Salt Creek | | | | | | | Yarra | 37°44′27″S 145°04′19″E | |
| | Banyule Creek | | | | | | | Yarra | | |
| | Plenty River | | | | | | 19 m (62 ft) | Yarra | 37°36′46″S 145°06′20″E | 47 km (29 mi) |
| | | Barber Creek | | | | | 169 m (554 ft) | Plenty | | 17 km (11 mi) |
| | | Bruces Creek | | | | | 189 m (620 ft) | Plenty | | 21 km (13 mi) |
| | | Scrubby Creek | | | | | 197 m (646 ft) | Plenty | | 11 km (7 mi) |
| | Ruffey Creek | | | | | | 17 m (56 ft) | Yarra | 37°46′08″S 145°08′22″E | 11 km (7 mi) |
| | Kestrel Creek | | | | | | | Yarra | | |
| | Diamond Creek | | | | | | 30 m (98 ft) | Yarra | 37°37′42″S 145°12′38″E | 11 km (7 mi) |
| | Mullum Mullum Creek | | | | | | 28 m (92 ft) | Yarra | 37°46′25″S 145°11′21″E | 11 km (7 mi) |
| | Stony Creek | | | | | | | Yarra | 37°42′58″S 145°12′30″E | |
| | Andersons Creek | | | | | | 17 m (56 ft) | Yarra | 37°44′59″S 145°12′38″E | 11 km (7 mi) |
| | Parson Gully | | | | | | | Yarra | | |
| | Jumping Creek | | | | | | | Yarra | 37°45′42″S 145°15′27″E | |
| | Pigeon Bank Gully | | | | | | | Yarra | 37°42′44″S 145°14′26″E | |
| | Watsons Creek | | | | | | 47 m (154 ft) | Yarra | 37°39′08″S 145°18′02″E | 18 km (11 mi) |
| | Brushy Creek | | | | | | 65 m (213 ft) | Yarra | 37°45′41″S 145°17′45″E | 9 km (6 mi) |
| | Olinda Creek | | | | | | | Yarra | 37°45′57″S 145°21′17″E | |
| | Steels Creek | | | | | | | Yarra | 37°37′15″S 145°22′31″E | |
| | Pauls Creek | | | | | | 74 m (243 ft) | Yarra | 37°38′26″S 145°26′02″E | 15 km (9 mi) |
| | Watts River | | | | | | 80 m (260 ft) | Yarra | 37°37′29″S 145°39′34″E | 29 km (18 mi) |
| | | Meyers Creek | | | | | 92 m (302 ft) | Watts | 37°35′20″S 145°31′02″E | 9 km (5.6 mi) |
| | Badger Creek | | | | | | | Yarra | 37°41′14″S 145°35′41″E | |
| | Woori Yallock Creek | | | | | | | Yarra | 37°43′52″S 145°29′53″E | |
| | Ure Creek | | | | | | | Yarra | 37°45′18″S 145°32′50″E | |
| | Hoddles Creek | | | | | | | Yarra | 37°47′35″S 145°34′54″E | |
| | Don River | | | | | | | Yarra | 37°45′20″S 145°35′13″E | |
| | Little Yarra River | | | | | | 108 m (354 ft) | Yarra | 37°50′16″S 145°40′46″E | 24 km (15 mi) |
| | | Britannia Creek | | | | | 123 m (404 ft) | Little Yarra | 37°47′47″S 145°41′02″E | 11 km (6.8 mi) |
| | Don Creek | | | | | | | Yarra | 37°45′47″S 145°36′21″E | |
| | Platts Creek | | | | | | | Yarra | 37°45′15″S 145°37′15″E | |
| | Frenchman Creek | | | | | | | Yarra | 37°44′23″S 145°37′41″E | |
| | Yankee Jim Creek | | | | | | | Yarra | 37°46′21″S 145°39′21″E | |
| | Dee River | | | | | | | Yarra | 37°44′59″S 145°38′41″E | |
| | Scotchman Creek | | | | | | | Yarra | | |
| | Four Mile Creek | | | | | | | Yarra | 37°46′03″S 145°42′25″E | |
| | Pheasant Creek | | | | | | | Yarra | 37°45′31″S 145°42′52″E | |
| | Starling Creek | | | | | | | Yarra | 37°45′56″S 145°43′36″E | |
| | Big Pats Creek | | | | | | 171 m (561 ft) | Yarra | 37°48′22″S 145°45′06″E | 12 km (7 mi) |
| | Dead Horse Creek | | | | | | | Yarra | 37°43′39″S 145°45′31″E | |
| | Cement Creek | | | | | | | Yarra | 37°42′50″S 145°44′31″E | |
| | Braham Creek | | | | | | | Yarra | 37°45′11″S 145°47′32″E | |
| | McDonald Creek | | | | | | | Yarra | 37°44′59″S 145°47′49″E | |
| | Crooked Creek | | | | | | | Yarra | | |
| | Starvation Creek | | | | | | 219 m (719 ft) | Yarra | 37°45′39″S 145°51′16″E | 14 km (9 mi) |
| | McMahons Creek | | | | | | 252 m (827 ft) | Yarra | 37°42′48″S 145°52′00″E | 14 km (9 mi) |
| | Armstrong Creek | | | | | | 275 m (902 ft) | Yarra | 37°39′56″S 145°50′58″E | 13 km (8 mi) |
| | | Armstrong Creek East Branch | | | | | 352 m (1,155 ft) | Armstrong | 37°37′31″S 145°53′26″E | 8 km (5 mi) |
| | Alderman Creek | | | | | | 357 m (1,171 ft) | Yarra | 37°43′37″S 145°56′45″E | 12 km (7 mi) |
| | Walsh Creek | | | | | | 357 m (1,171 ft) | Yarra | 37°36′28″S 145°56′52″E | 19 km (12 mi) |
| | | Clear Creek | | | | | 357 m (1,171 ft) | Walsh | 37°40′15″S 145°58′10″E | 12 km (7 mi) |
| | Baker Creek | | | | | | 488 m (1,601 ft) | Yarra | 37°45′38″S 145°49′14″E | 7 km (4 mi) |
| | Woods Creek | | | | | | 532 m (1,745 ft) | Yarra | 37°43′02″S 146°07′19″E | 11 km (7 mi) |
| | Mmbw Channel | | | | | | 775 m (2,543 ft) | Yarra | | 23 km (14 mi) |

== Geographical features ==
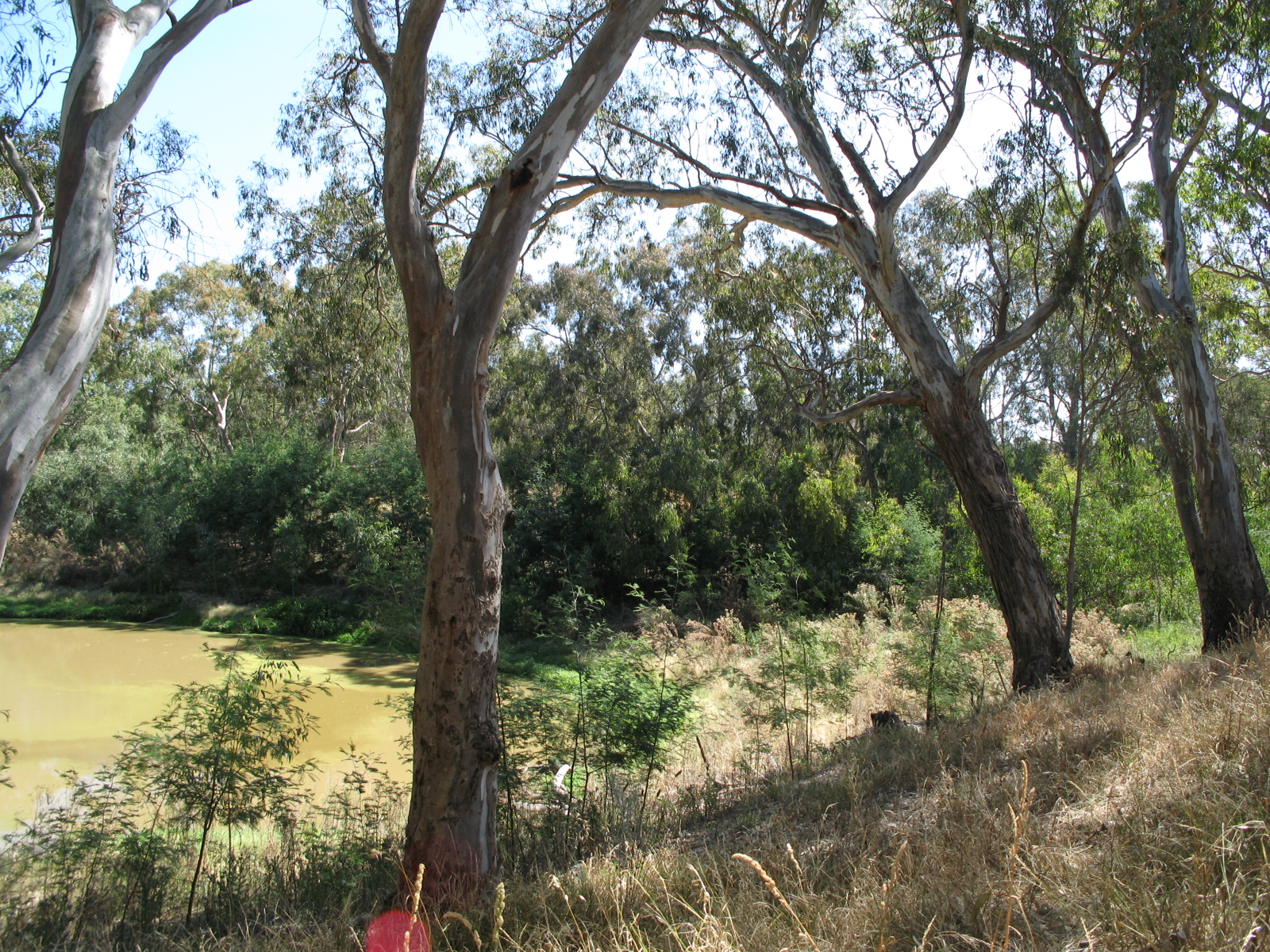
Bolin Bolin Billabong, cut off in 1100 AD, shown here in 2008 at 10-15% its volume

The Yarra River hosts a wide range of geographical features, perhaps the most plentiful of which are billabongs, of which there are over 100, particularly in the floodplains near Yering, Yarra Glen and Coldstream. Being a considerably thin river for almost its entire length, there are very few islands or lakes. In the middle reaches there are a few rapids of easy to moderate difficulty, however these are sparsely distributed. Below is a list of the river's geographical features, including tributaries (shown in bold) and man-made features or townships (shown in italics), for bearings (from downstream to upstream):

- Entrance to Yarra River in Hobsons Bay
- West Gate Bridge
- **Stony Creek**
- **Maribyrnong River**
- Coode Island (created in 1880s)
- Fishermans Bend (created in 1880s)
- **Moonee Ponds Creek**
- Victoria Harbour (created in 1892)
- Batman's Hill (levelled in mid-19th century)
- Turning Basin
- Melbourne CBD
- Princes Bridge
- Birrarung Marr
- Ornamental Lake
- Punt Hill
- Herring Island
- Burnley Harbour and Wetlands
- **Gardiners Creek**
- Burnley Bend
- Hawthorn
- Yarra Bend (Ends)
- Dights Falls
- **Merri Creek**
- Galatea Point
- Studley Park Boathouse
- Flying Fox Lookout
- Fairfield Boathouse
- Yarra Bend (Begins)
- Johnston Street Bridge
- Kew Billabong
- **Darebin Creek**
- **Glass Creek**
- Turner Street, Abbotsford

Yarra Flats (Ends)

- **Koonung Creek**
- Bolin Bolin Billabong (cut off in 1100)
- Annulus Billabong
- **Salt Creek**
- Sills Bend
- Heidelberg
- Yarra Flats (Begins)
- **Banyule Creek**
- Banyule Flats and Billabongs
- **Plenty River**
- Templestowe
- **Ruffey Creek**
- **Kestrel Creek**
- Westerfolds Rapids
- Fitzsimons Lane Bridge
- **Diamond Creek**
- Sweeneys Flats
- **Mullum Mullum Creek**
- Tikalara
- Pound Bend (Ends)
- Bobs Wetlands
- Pound Bend Tunnel
- **Stony Creek**
- Pound Bend (Begins)
- **Andersons Creek**
- Fourth Hill
- Whipstick Gully
- Warrandyte
- Scotchmans Hill
- The Island
- **Parson Gully**
- Black Flat
- **Jumping Creek**
- Blue Tongue Bend
- Warrandyte Gorge
- **Pigeon Bank Gully**
- Kangaroo Ground Rapids
- **Watsons Creek**
- Bend of Isles
- Moniques Island
- **Brushy Creek**
- Mount Lofty
- Bob's Rock
- Canoe Slalom Rapids
- Christmas Hills Rapids
- Yering Gorge
- Yering Billabongs
- **Olinda Creek**
- Yarra Glen
- Yarra Flats Billabongs
- **Steels Creek**
- Coldstream Flats and Billabongs
- **Pauls Creek**
- Healesville
- **Watts River**
- **Badger Creek**
- Warramate Hills
- **Woori Yallock Creek**
- Woori Yallock Flats and Billabong
- **Ure Creek**
- Launching Place
- **Hoddles Creek**
- **Don River**
- **Little Yarra River**
- **Don Creek**
- Yarra Junction
- **Don Creek**
- **Platts Creek**
- **Frenchman Creek**
- **Yankee Jim Creek**
- **Dee River**
- **Scotchmans Creek**
- Warburton
- **Four Mile Creek**
- **Pheasant Creek**
- **Starling Creek**
- **Big Pats Creek**
- **Dead Horse Creek**
- **Cement Creek**
- **Braham Creek**
- **McDonald Creek**
- **Crooked Creek**
- **Starvation Creek**
- Little Peninsula Tunnel
- Big Peninsula Tunnel
- **McMahons Creek**
- Upper Yarra Dam
- Upper Yarra Reservoir (created in 1957)
- **Armstrong Creek**
- **Alderman Creek**
- **Walsh Creek**
- **Baker Creek**
- **Woods Creek**
- **Mmbw Channel**

== See also ==
- Geology of Victoria
- Crossings of the Yarra River
