= Hoddle =

Hoddle may refer to:

== People ==
- Carl Hoddle (1967–2008), English football player and coach
- Glenn Hoddle (born 1957), English football player and manager, played many times for England
- Robert Hoddle (1794–1881), Australian surveyor

== Places ==
All the following geographical entities in Australia are named for Robert Hoddle.

- Division of Hoddle, former federal electoral division in the Melbourne suburbs
- Hoddle Bridge, Melbourne
- Hoddle Grid, streets in central Melbourne
- Hoddle Highway, urban highway in Melbourne
- Hoddle railway station, former station in South Gippsland

== See also ==
- Hödl
- Hoddle Street massacre, shooting in Melbourne, 1987
- Hoddles Creek (tributary), creek near Melbourne, Australia
- Hoddles Creek, Victoria, town near Melbourne
- Hoddles Track, New South Wales, Australia
