= Myrtle Creek Bridge =

Heritage-listed road bridge in Melboure, Victoria, Australia

- Coordinates: 37°42′52″S 145°35′49″E
- Carries: Don Road
- Crosses: Myrtle Creek
- Locale: Don Valley, Yarra Ranges, Melbourne, Victoria, Australia
- Maintained by: VicRoads

Characteristics
- Design: Beam bridge
- Material: Timber
- No. of spans: 3

History
- Architect: Country Roads Board
- Built: 1930; 96 years ago
- Replaces: c. 1918 timber bridge

Victorian Heritage Register
- Official name: Myrtle Creek Bridge
- Type: Registered place
- Designated: 18 November 1999
- Reference no.: H1855
- Heritage overlay no.: H102
- Category: Transport - Road

Location
- Interactive map of Myrtle Creek Bridge

The Myrtle Creek Bridge is a timber road beam bridge that carries the Don Road across Myrtle Creek, in Don Valley, in the Yarra Ranges, in the north eastern suburbs of Melbourne, in Victoria, Australia.

Built in 1930 on the traditional lands of the Wurundjeri people, the bridge was added to the Victorian Heritage Register on 18 November 1999 in recognition of its architectural, historical, and scientific (technical) significance; and was also added to a non-statutory list by the Victorian branch of the National Trust on 8 November 1999.

== History ==
=== Development of Don Road ===
The Don Valley was first settled in the 1870s, and Don Road existed by 1884–1885 when the Roads and Bridges Branch of the Victorian Public Works Department received a complaint that contractor Buller was damaging cultivated land beside Don Road, most likely during the earliest stages of construction of the road. A construction worker who was involved in building the Don Road in 1888 was impressed by the numerous lyrebirds along the steep bush track. As in many other country areas, pioneer settlers were the first road contractors and they depended upon simple farm implements, so early bridges were usually crude timber constructions.

Between 1900 and 1905, a more intensive effort went into forming the road, including forming a basic earth roadway through what was still largely virgin forest land. However, major formation works on the road including the creation of good timber bridges, appear not to have occurred until after the Country Roads Board (CRB) was formed, in 1912. The three original Country Roads Board members, led by William Calder from 1912 to 1928, had a special interest in the development for agricultural purposes of fertile and well-watered hill country within relatively easy reach of Melbourne. Thus in commenting on the land stretching along the Great Dividing Range between Whittlesea and Healesville in 1914, the Board noted that ‘this district has an ample and regular rainfall, and fertile soil, and being comparatively close to the city, would quickly develop if reasonable road facilities were provided’. Calder thought the same of the land spreading between Healesville and Launching Place on the main Warburton-Melbourne Road. Despite earlier efforts to create dirt roads through the forest, in 1914 this country still lacked adequate roads and bridges to make it viable farmland.

Launching Place near Warburton on the main Melbourne-Warburton Road had increased in significance with the coming of the Warburton railway line. In 1914 it was described as a postal township and holiday resort with a church, saw mills, a hotel and boarding houses, only 66 kilometres (41 mi) from Melbourne by rail. By then it was the rail connecting point for farmers at Hoddles Creek and Beenak to the south east, which area had been served by a postal-road connection with Woori Yallock before the railways came.

The two local saw mills increasingly depended on obtaining timber from the hill country towards Healesville, where better all-weather roads were badly needed. The main local industries were fruit growing, dairying and milling the messmate, blackbutt and blackwood timbers that then abounded in the surrounding hills. In the eyes of Calder, and the CRB, the conversion of blackbutt and messmate trees into sawn timber provided a sensible way to turn forest land into orchards and dairy farms. In 1926, when the Don Road was extended further towards Healesville as a CRB project, the little township of Launching Place had a population of 200.

The road that we know as the Don Road, linking the Warburton Road at Launching Place with the Maroondah Highway at Healesville, was improved by the CRB in two distinct stages, during World War I and the later 1920s. The first section of the road out from Launching Place was planned and surveyed as one of the very earliest main road projects of the CRB, and appears on the earliest CRB map of Victorian Main Roads entitled to receive State funding, printed with the 1914 CRB Annual Report No. 1. This first section of main road, as shown on the 1914 map, extended out from Launching Place to the boundary of the then Shire of Upper Yarra, probably linking there with earlier more primitive road-works of the Healesville Shire. The CRB Report for 1914 indicated that 9.25 kilometres (5.75 mi) of the Don Road north from Launching Place had already been surveyed by the Board.

The 1915 CRB Annual Report indicated that more than eleven kilometres (seven miles) of the Don Road north from Launching Place was not only surveyed, but was also fully planned by Board engineers in preparation for road works. Timber-bridge and culvert works were under construction during 1917 and 1918 when little road work was done because of the war, indicating that the Don Road section out from Launching Place was given a high priority among CRB main roads.

Contractors Sly and Starling were building one such timber bridge on this section of the Don Road in 1917, at a cost of £147, and in 1918 contractor D. McHugh was busy building seven timber culverts on the same section, at a total cost of £390. Interestingly the latter contract, as also the formation and grading of 5.6 kilometres (3.5 mi) of permanent road works in 1917–1918, is listed as directly under CRB supervision rather than under Shire supervision, suggesting a direct Board involvement in this obviously important wartime project.

=== First bridge ===
The Don Road, taking its name from the Don River which it crossed, was also one of the very earliest roads officially declared by the CRB under the new State Developmental Roads scheme implemented at the end of World War I. This meant that it could be constructed with State funds, to encourage forest and agricultural industries. Road construction out from Launching Place continued through 1919–1920. In the latter year the CRB recorded another 2.54 kilometres (1.58 mi) of construction works, plus eight kilometres (five miles) of road maintenance on this section of State-funded main road. The first bridge over the Myrtle Creek was possibly completed between 1915 and 1920. The date given to the current bridge by VicRoads is 1930, which would indicate a fairly short life for any wartime timber bridge constructed at Myrtle Creek. Perhaps an earlier bridge was incorporated into the first CRB roadworks.

In 1927 the CRB was directly involved in supervising a temporary bridge contract on the earliest main road section of Don Road where it crossed the Yarra River at Launching Place, which might suggest a flood-damage emergency situation there.

The Don Road appears on current VicRoads maps as a main road, and when major road works were undertaken during World War I and the later 1920s it was constructed in two distinct segments, with the first section out of Launching Place being financed both in terms of construction and ongoing maintenance as a main road, using State funding. The second section on towards Healesville was constructed as a developmental road, which meant that (while it retained that status) there was no government contribution to its ongoing maintenance, once constructed from State funds.

=== Current bridge ===
The Myrtle Creek Bridge on the Don Road was probably constructed in 1930 as part of the ongoing developmental road project, although there is no reference to its construction in the published reports by the CRB of that era. The CRB Annual Reports for 1928 and 1929 suggest on-going developmental road construction works on the Don Road in Upper Yarra Shire, but they appear to contain no information for any such works in 1930. In 1931 the first sealing with cold tar and bitural began on the main road segment of the Don Road, near Launching Place, indicating that it was then evolving into a motor road.

Whether built c. 1918 or in 1930, the first Myrtle Creek Bridge would have been built to pre-motor patterns, with a transverse-timbered deck fitted either directly to the timber stringers, or to spiking planks attached thereto. That original timber bridge probably had the same attractive built-in curves where the road tightly hugs a bend in a tree-fern gully, that makes the longitudinally-decked motor bridge at Myrtle Creek so fascinating and rare a structure today. If originally built with the developmental road extension works circa 1930, the Myrtle Creek Bridge was presumably re-decked to standard post-1931 CRB motor-deck specifications in the years after World War II.

== Description ==
Myrtle Creek Bridge, originally constructed to plans approved by the Country Roads Board (CRB), is a three-span timber-beam road bridge on the Don Road crossing of the Myrtle Creek, eight kilometres (five miles) north of Launching Place. It is a standard CRB longitudinal-timber motor-deck type bridge. It has a curved ground-plan and deck, involving two changes of direction in the decking. The present bridge is thought to have been built c. 1930; it probably replaced an earlier World War I-era bridge. The longitudinal timber deck would have been added later, presumably in the years after the World War II. The bridge is set on a tight curve on a quiet mountain road, at an unusually beautiful creek crossing amidst surroundings of tree ferns and eucalypts. It is currently maintained for motor traffic by VicRoads.

== See also ==
- List of road bridges in Victoria
- List of places on the Victorian Heritage Register in the Shire of Yarra Ranges
