= Hoddles Creek =

Hoddles Creek may refer to:

- Hoddles Creek (tributary), a tributary watercourse of the Yarra River in Victoria, Australia
- Hoddles Creek, Victoria, a locality in Victoria, Australia on Hoddles Creek
