= Little Yarra River =

Little Yarra
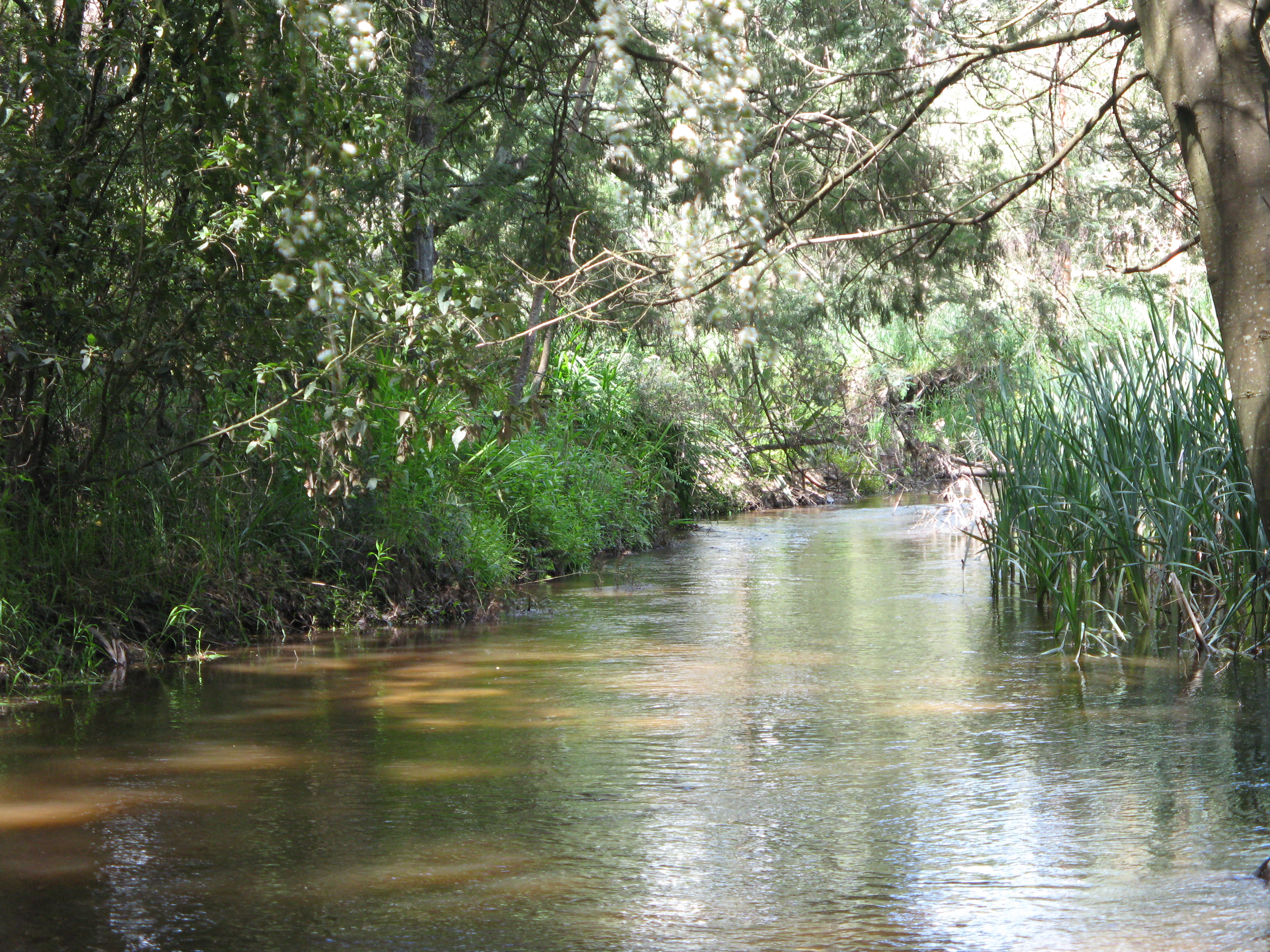
- Little Yarra River at Yarra Junction, in 2009.

- Location of the Little Yarra River mouth in Victoria

Location
- Country: Australia
- State: Victoria
- Region: South Eastern Highlands (IBRA), Greater Metropolitan Melbourne
- LGA: Yarra Ranges Shire
- Townships: Powelltown, Gilderoy, Gladysdale, Yarra Junction

Physical characteristics
- Source: Yarra Ranges
  - location: east of Powelltown
  - coordinates: 37°51′59″S 145°46′18″E
  - elevation: 254 m (833 ft)
- Mouth: confluence with the Yarra River
  - location: west of Yarra Junction
  - coordinates: 37°46′28″S 145°35′20″E
  - elevation: 107 m (351 ft)
- Length: 24 km (15 mi)

Basin features
- River system: Port Phillip catchment
- Tributaries
  - right: Britannia Creek

The Little Yarra River is a perennial river of the Port Phillip catchment, in the Greater Metropolitan Melbourne region of the Australian state of Victoria.

== Location and features ==
The Little Yarra River rises in native forests in the Yarra Ranges around Powelltown in east–central Victoria. The river flows generally west by north, passing through rural areas and joined by one minor tributary, before reaching its confluence with the Yarra River west of the town of Yarra Junction. The river descends 147 metres (482 ft) over its 24 kilometres (15 mi) course.

The river is traversed by the Warburton Highway east of Yarra Junction.

== See also ==
- Geography of the Yarra River
- List of rivers of Australia § Victoria
