= Don Valley, Victoria =

Don Valley
- Town
- Interactive map of Don Valley
- Country: Australia
- State: Victoria
- LGA: Shire of Yarra Ranges
- Location: 70 km (43 mi) from Melbourne; 16 km (9.9 mi) from Warburton

Government
  - State electorate: Eildon
  - Federal division: Casey

Population
  - Total: 586 (2016 census)
- Postcode: 3139
Localities around Don Valley
Mount Toolebewong	Healesville	Wesburn
Mount Toolebewong	Don Valley	Wesburn
Launching Place	Launching Place	Launching Place

Don Valley is a town in Victoria, Australia, approximately 70 km east of Melbourne's central business district, located within the Shire of Yarra Ranges local government area. Don Valley recorded a population of 586 at the 2021 census.

A well known farm on Don Valley is Haining Farm, a 65-hectare cattle and dairy farm with Jersey and Friesian cows and other farm animals, located at the entrance of Don River into the Yarra River. It is no longer run as a farm, and is being regenerated into bushland for the Helmeted Honeyeater (Lichenostomus melanops cassidix) a critically endangered bird. Haining Farm is managed by Parks Victoria.

Although Don Valley has minimal development, there is the Don Valley Primary School, an archery park, and is home to a satellite fire station for the "Hillcrest" CFA brigade which serves Woori Yallock, Launching Place and Don Valley after the Launching Place and Woori Yallock brigades amalgamated in December 2007.

== Heritage listing ==
The following place in Don Valley is listed on the Victorian Heritage Register:

- Myrtle Creek Bridge, Don Road
