= Wesburn =

- Town
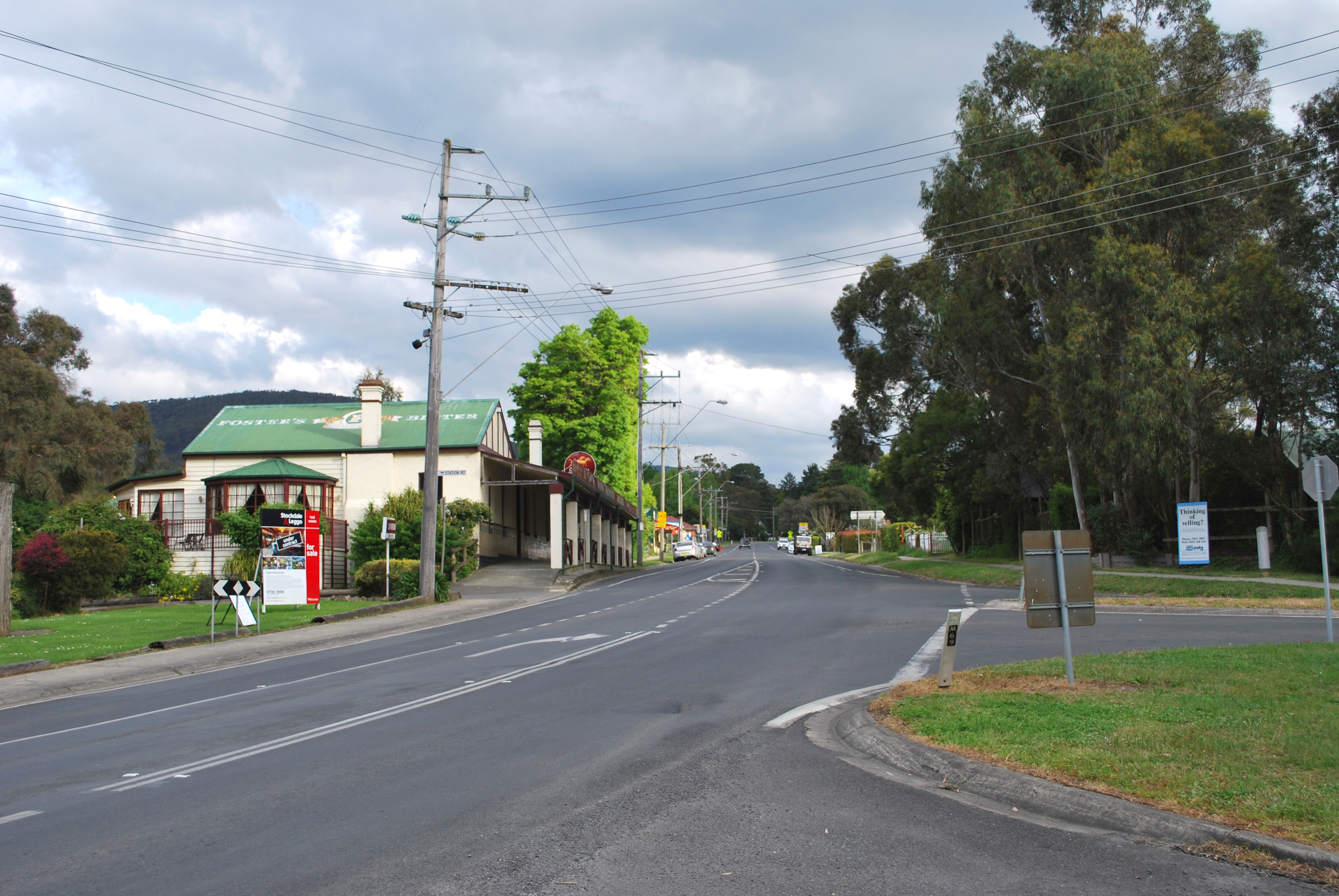
- The Warburton Highway passing through Wesburn on its way to Melbourne. The Sam Knott Hotel can be seen to the left.

- Interactive map of Wesburn
- Coordinates: 37.767°S 145.647°E
- Country: Australia
- State: Victoria
- LGA: Shire of Yarra Ranges
- Location: 62 km (39 mi) from Melbourne; 7 km (4.3 mi) from Warburton

Government
  - State electorate: Eildon
  - Federal division: Casey
- Elevation: 257 m (843 ft)

Population
  - Total: 1,052 (2021 census)
- Postcode: 3799
Localities around Wesburn
Don Valley	Millgrove	Warburton
Don Valley	Wesburn	Warburton
Yarra Junction	Gladysdale	Warburton

Wesburn is a town in Victoria, Australia, 62 km east from Melbourne's central business district, located within the Shire of Yarra Ranges local government area. The population of Wesburn was 1,052 according to the 2021 census.

Predominantly rural, the township features a narrow strip of residential dwellings along and branching off the Warburton Highway.

The name Wesburn is derived from its original name of West Warburton. Warburton West Post Office opened on 7 February 1893, was renamed Wesburn in 1925 and closed in 1993. Wesburn was also served by a railway station on the former Warburton railway line until closure in 1965. Today the former railway line has been transformed into a walking and cycling path called the Warburton Trail.

Wesburn Primary School opened in 1904 after relocation of the building from Millgrove. The school has a current enrolment of around 100 and is a participant in the Stephanie Alexander Kitchen Garden program.

The Wesburn Recreation Reserve hosts junior football and netball teams. The township is also serviced by a pub and a number of small shops. Public transport is provided by bus route from Warburton to Chirnside Park.
