= Kristian Nairn =

Northern Irish actor (born 1975)

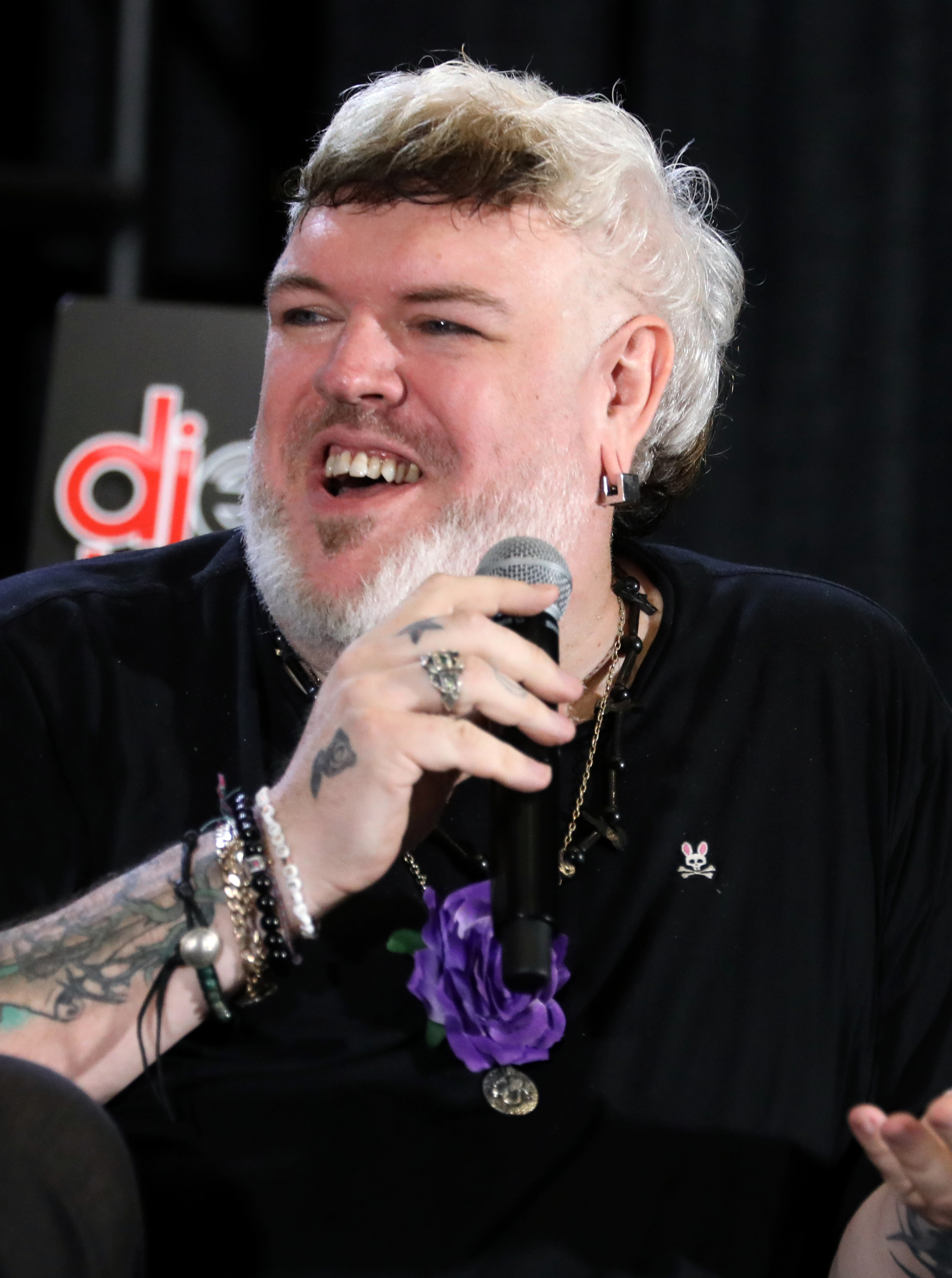
- Nairn in 2024
- Born: 25 November 1975 (age 50); Lisburn, Northern Ireland
- Occupations: Actor; DJ; musician
- Years active: 2011–present
- Height: 208 cm (6 ft 10 in)

Kristian Nairn (born 25 November 1975) is an actor and DJ from Lisburn, Northern Ireland. He is best known for his portrayal of Hodor in the HBO fantasy series Game of Thrones (2011–2014, 2016). He also played Wee John Feeney on the HBO Max series Our Flag Means Death (2022–2023).

== Career ==
Nairn's portrayal of Hodor on Game of Thrones was his first acting role; Nairn earned enough to buy his mother a house. He is a progressive house/trance DJ, and used to be the resident DJ of Kremlin, a gay club in Belfast. Since Game of Thrones began, Nairn has toured as a DJ with "Rave of Thrones" using musical themes and costumes from the television series. At the end of 2017, he performed the first part of the Dimitri Vegas & Like Mike concerts in Antwerp. He was the DJ during the BlizzCon 2016 anniversary party and BlizzCon 2018 closing festivities. In October 2018, Nairn appeared in a commercial for eToro that was launched on YouTube, featuring the Internet meme Hodl.

Nairn is an accomplished guitarist. He got the opportunity to play backstage with Megadeth during the Hellfest Open Air Festival in Clisson, France, in June 2018.

He portrayed Wee John Feeney on the HBO series Our Flag Means Death from 2022 to 2023.

In August 2025, Nairn was announced as a contestant on the upcoming twenty-third series of Strictly Come Dancing. Later that month, it was announced Nairn had withdrawn from the series due to "unexpected medical reasons".

== Personal life ==
In March 2014, Nairn publicly discussed his gay identity in an interview with a Game of Thrones fan site. He stated: "When you talk about 'the gay community,' you are talking about MY community. [...] I've never hidden my sexuality from anyone, my whole life in fact, and I've been waiting for someone to ask about it in an interview." He went on to say that his sexuality is "a very small part of who I am on the whole, but nonetheless, in this day and age, it's important to stand up and be counted." In 2015, Nairn clarified in an interview with Chicago Go Pride that it was really his "second coming out. I'd done it when I was 14 and didn't think I'd have to do it again. Especially since every single person in my life knew."

In April 2023, Nairn revealed to the BBC that he had witnessed the shooting of policeman Darren Bradshaw at the Parliament Bar in Belfast in May 1997.

== Filmography ==
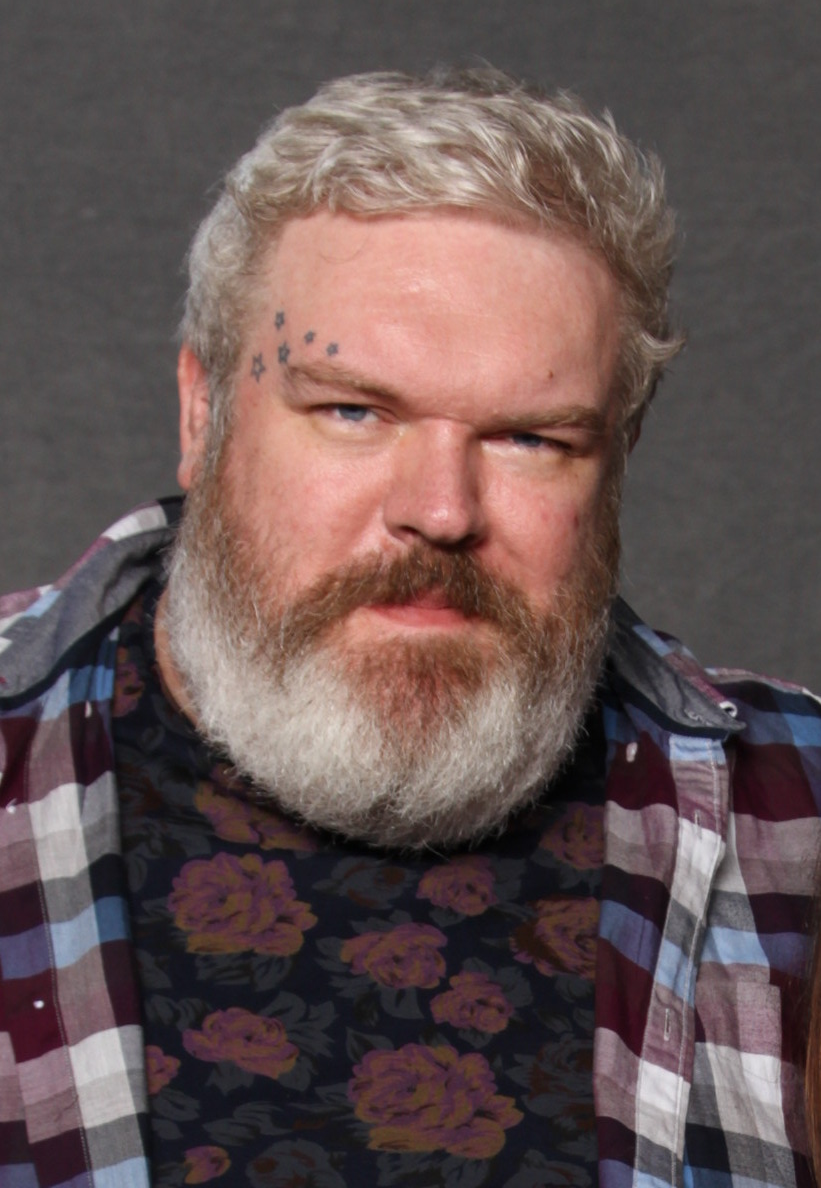
Nairn in 2016

=== Film ===
Year	Title	Role	Notes
2014	Our Gay Wedding	Himself	
2014	Treasure Trapped	Himself	Documentary
2015	The Four Warriors	Baliphar	
2016	Mythica: The Godslayer	Tek	
2018	The Appearance	Johnny	
2018	Robin Hood: The Rebellion	Thomas	
2023	Unwelcome	Eoin	

=== Television ===
Year	Title	Role	Notes
2011–2016	Game of Thrones	Hodor	Recurring (seasons 1–4, 6), 23 episodes Nominated – 2017 MTV Movie & TV Awards for Tearjerker
2012–2013	Ripper Street	Barnaby Silver	2 episodes
2013	Chronicles of Comic Con	Himself	1 episode
2014	The Wil Wheaton Project	Himself/Hodor	1 episode
2018	The Sidemen Show	Himself	1 episode
2018	The Rookie	Wallace	Episode: "The Switch"
2021	The Boulet Brothers' Dragula	Himself: Guest Judge	1 episode
2022–2023	Our Flag Means Death	Wee John Feeney	Main role

=== Podcast ===
Year	Title	Role	Notes
2011	Yogpod 38: Hodor!	Himself	Interview
2011	Cast of Thrones: A Golden Crown	Himself	Interview
2012	Cast of Thrones: Bonus Episode 9	Himself	Interview
2013–2015	Two is Company by Zack Luye and Kristian Nairn	Himself	Talk show 16 episodes
2019	Inside of You with Michael Rosenbaum	Himself	Interview

=== Accolades ===
Year	Award	Category	Nominee(s)	Result	Ref.
2022	Peabody Awards	Entertainment	Our Flag Means Death	Nominated	
