= Warburton Highway =

Warburton Highway Victoria
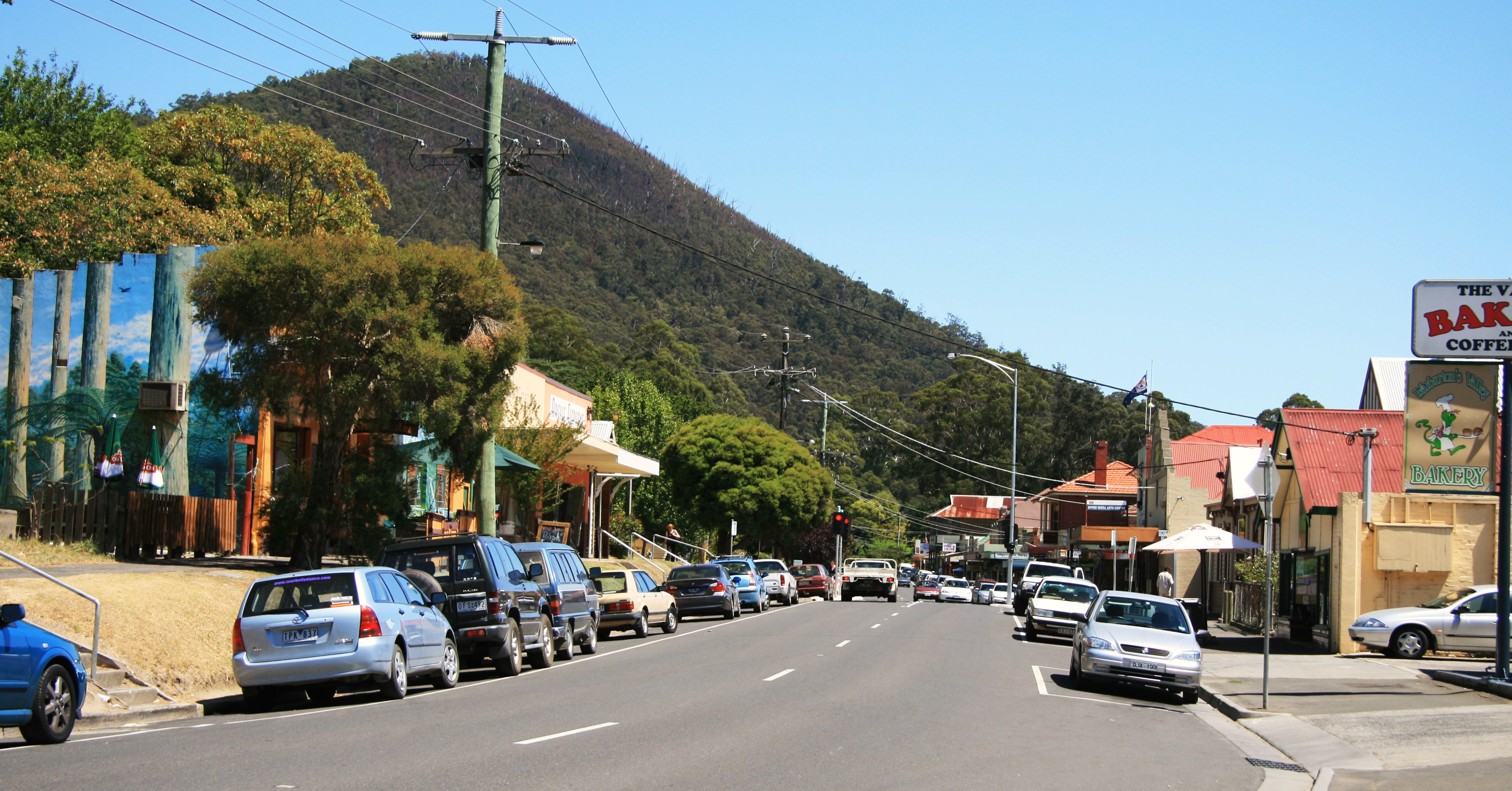
- Main Street in Warburton
- Coordinates: 37.749787°S 145.373237°E (West end); 37.752627°S 145.703110°E (East end)

General information
- Type: Highway
- Length: 34 km (21 mi)
- Gazetted: October 1913 (as Main Road); 1959/60 (as State Highway)
- Route number(s): B380 (1998–present)
- Former route number: State Route 174 (1986–1998)

Major junctions
- West end: Maroondah Highway; Lilydale, Melbourne
- Healesville–Koo Wee Rup Road; Yarra Junction–Noojee Road; Donna Buang Road
- East end: Woods Point Road; Warburton, Victoria

Location(s)
- Region: Greater Melbourne
- Major settlements: Wandin North, Seville, Woori Yallock, Launching Place, Wesburn, Millgrove

Highway system
- Highways in Australia; National Highway • Freeways in Australia; Highways in Victoria

Warburton Highway is a 34 kilometre west–east semi-rural highway on the eastern fringes of Melbourne, Victoria, linking Lilydale to Warburton in the Yarra Valley wine region, as well as Melbourne's closest mountain peak to receive regular snowfall, Mount Donna Buang.

== Route ==
Warburton Highway commences at the intersection with Maroondah Highway on the eastern edges of Lilydale and heads in an easterly direction as a two-lane, single carriageway road through Seville, Woori Yallock, Launching Victoria and eventually to the town of Warburton. It has been completely sealed since 1941, with one lane in each direction and occasional overtaking lanes being provided. Speed limits range from 50 to 60 km/h through townships and 70–80 km/h elsewhere.

== History ==
The passing of the Country Roads Act 1912 through the Parliament of Victoria provided for the establishment of the Country Roads Board (later VicRoads) and their ability to declare Main Roads, taking responsibility for the management, construction and care of the state's major roads from local municipalities. (Main) Warburton Road was declared a Main Road, from Lilydale via Woori Yallock to Warburton, on 20 October 1913.

The passing of the Country Roads Act 1958 (itself an evolution from the original Highways and Vehicles Act 1924) provided for the declaration of State Highways, roads two-thirds financed by the state government through the Country Roads Board. Warburton Highway was declared a State Highway in the 1959/60 financial year, from Lilydale via Seville, Woori Yallock and Yarra Junction to Warburton (for a total of 21 miles), subsuming the original declaration of (Main) Warburton Road as a Main Road.

Warburton Highway was signed as State Route 174 between Lilydale and Warburton in 1986; with Victoria's conversion to the newer alphanumeric system in the late 1990s, this was replaced by route B380.

The passing of the Road Management Act 2004 granted the responsibility of overall management and development of Victoria's major arterial roads to VicRoads: in 2004, VicRoads re-declared this road as Warburton Highway (Arterial #6100), beginning from Maroondah Highway in Lilydale and ending at Warburton.

== Major intersections and towns ==
Warburton Highway is entirely contained within the Shire of Yarra Ranges local government area.

Location	km	mi	Destinations	Notes
Lilydale	0.0	0.0	Maroondah Highway (B300) – Lilydale, Melbourne, Yarra Glen, Yea	Western terminus of highway and route B380 at traffic-light intersection
Wandin North	6.6	4.1	Clegg Road (C402) – Mount Evelyn, Montrose	Roundabout
Seville	9.4	5.8	Monbulk–Seville Road (C405) – Monbulk	Roundabout
Woori Yallock	15.9	9.9	Healesville–Koo Wee Rup Road (C411 north) – Healesville, Toolangi	Concurrency with route C411
Woori Yallock	16.0	9.9	Healesville–Koo Wee Rup Road (C411 south) – Cockatoo, Pakenham, Koo Wee Rup	Concurrency with route C411
Launching Place	20.8	12.9	Gembrook–Launching Place Road (C424) – Gembrook, Pakenham	
Launching Place	21.6	13.4	Don Road (C506) – Healesville, Mount Donna Buang	
Yarra Junction	24.4	15.2	Yarra Junction–Noojee Road (C425) – Noojee, Warragul, Korumburra, Mount Baw Baw	Traffic light intersection
Warburton	33.8	21.0	Donna Buang Road (C507) – Mount Donna Buang, Narbethong, Marysville	
Warburton	33.8	21.0	Woods Point Road (C511) – Reefton, Woods Point	Eastern terminus of highway and route B380
1.000 mi = 1.609 km; 1.000 km = 0.621 mi: Concurrency terminus; Route transition

== See also ==
- Highways in Australia
- Highways in Victoria
