= East Warburton =

- Town
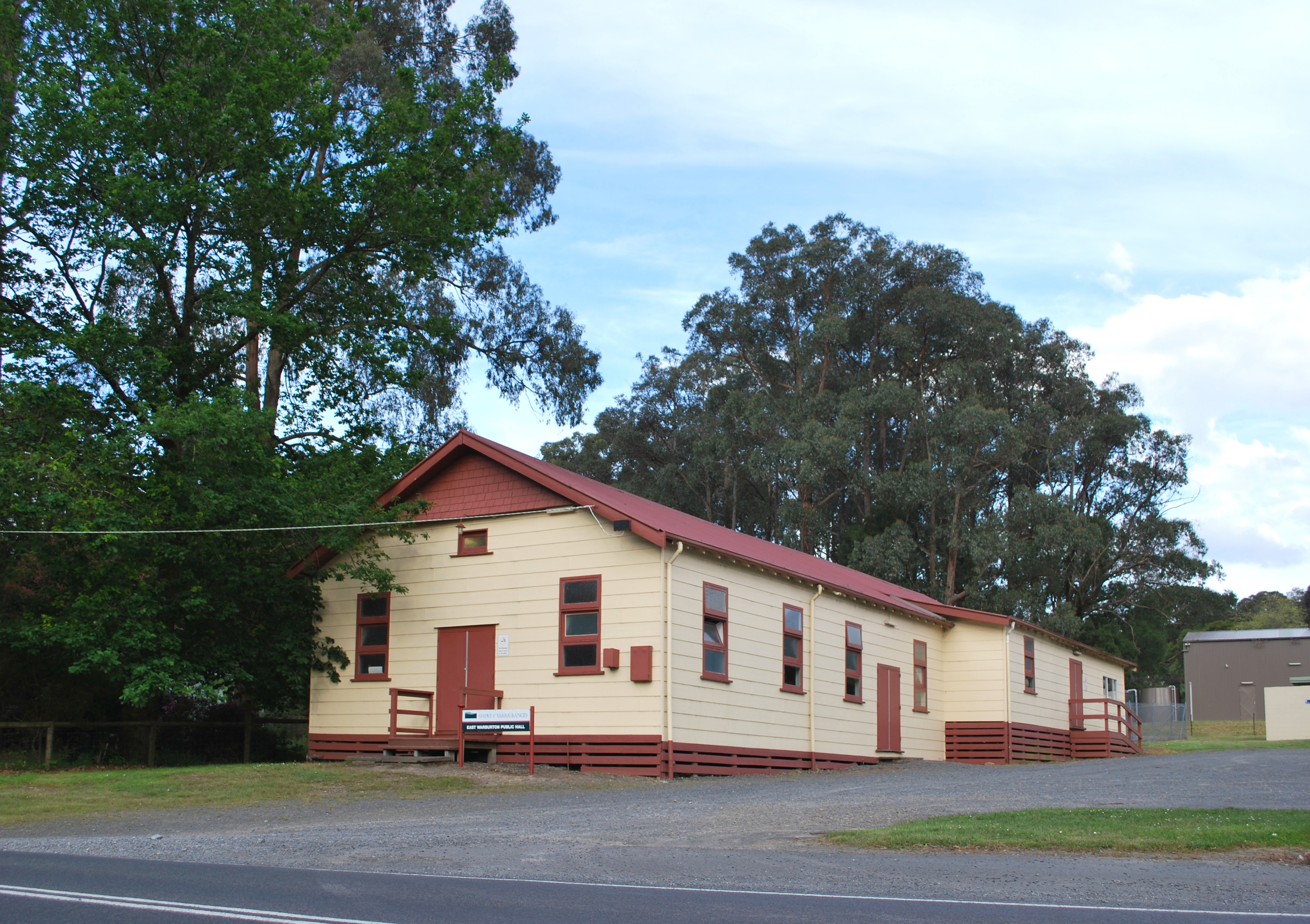
- Public hall

- Interactive map of East Warburton
- Coordinates: 37°44′S 145°44′E
- Country: Australia
- State: Victoria
- LGA: Shire of Yarra Ranges
- Location: 67 km (42 mi) NE of Melbourne; 6 km (3.7 mi) E of Warburton

Government
  - State electorate: Eildon
  - Federal division: Casey
- Elevation: 159 m (522 ft)

Population
  - Total: 906 (2021 census)
- Postcode: 3799
Localities around East Warburton
McMahons Creek	McMahons Creek	McMahons Creek
McMahons Creek	East Warburton	McMahons Creek
Warburton	Warburton	Warburton

East Warburton is a town in Victoria, Australia, 67 km east from Melbourne's central business district, located within the Shire of Yarra Ranges local government area. East Warburton recorded a population of 906 at the 2021 census.

The Post Office opened on 1 November 1921 and closed in 1975.

== Heritage listing ==
The following place in East Warburton is listed on the Victorian Heritage Register:

- Cement Creek Plantation, also known as the Warburton Redwoods, a conifer forest on Cement Creek Road
