= Derelict Aircraft Museum =

- Dissolved: 2017
- Location: Launching Place, Victoria, Australia
- Coordinates: 37.7981°S 145.5845°E
- Type: Aviation museum
- Owner: Richard Wetherburn

The Derelict Air Museum was an Australian aviation museum located in Launching Place, Victoria.

It was a collection of aircraft in various states of repair, owned by Richard Wetherburn. The exhibits included a US Air Force North American F-86D Sabre, two Royal Australian Air Force (RAAF) Aermacchi MB-326, an RAAF de Havilland Vampire, a Royal Australian Navy Westland Wessex, a Polish Air Force PZL TS-11 Iskra, a GAF Nomad, a Beechcraft Queen Air, a Commonwealth Department of Health de Havilland Dove, and the nose of an Ansett Australia Fokker F-28 Fellowship. The museum also had a large collection of model aircraft.

Prior to 2017, it was closed and dismantled.
