= Cement Creek Plantation =

Heritage-listed forest in Melbourne, Victoria, Australia

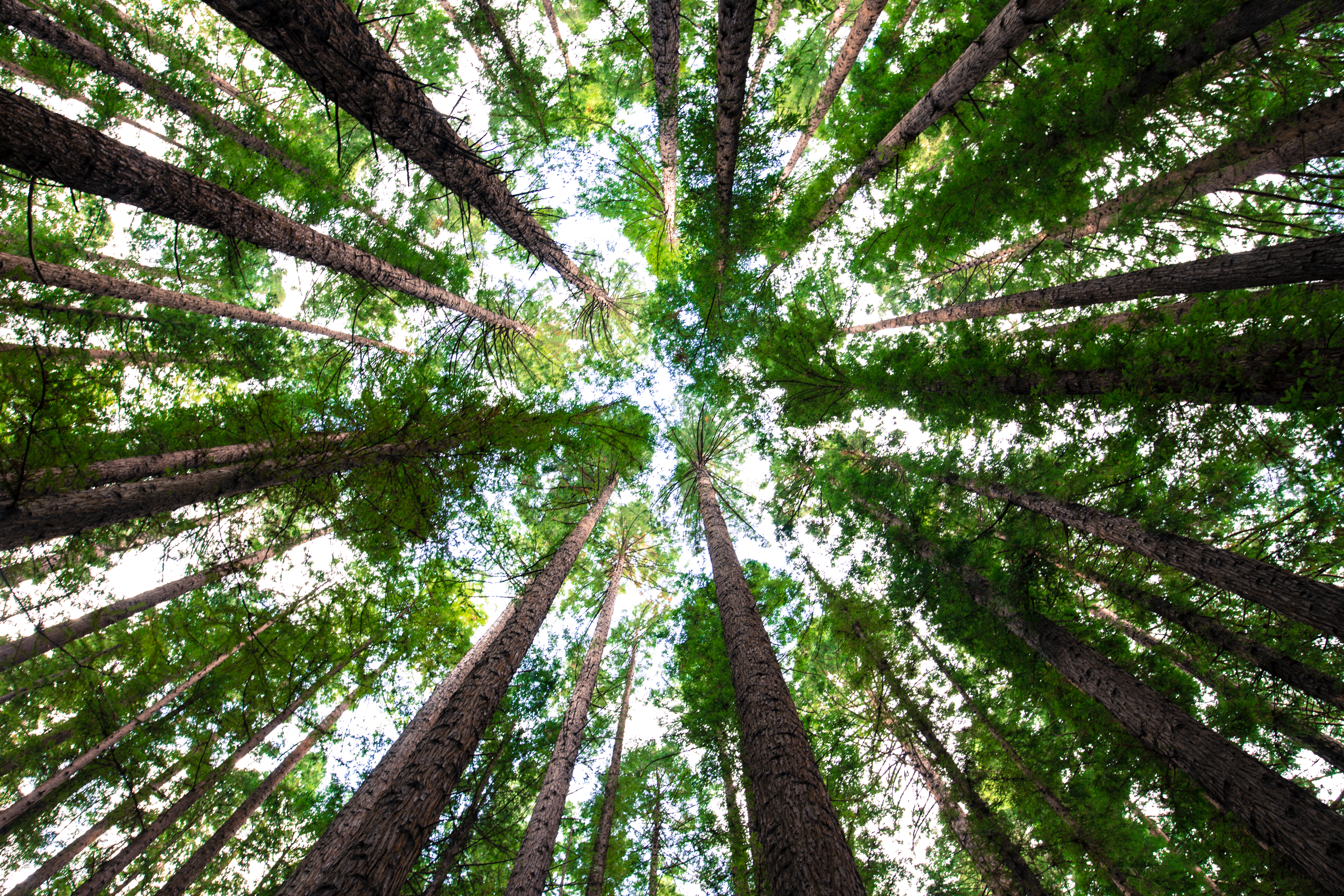
- Sequoia sempervirens in 2016

- Location of the forest in Victoria
- Interactive map of Cement Creek Plantation

Geography
- Location: Cement Creek Road, East Warburton, Yarra Ranges, Victoria, Australia
- Coordinates: 37°43′11″S 145°45′09″E
- Area: 1.8 ha (4.4 acres)

Administration
- Status: Abandoned (as an experiment)
- Established: 1929; 97 years ago by the Melbourne & Metropolitan Board of Works
- Events: 1980s (abandoned)
- Authority: Parks Victoria
- Website: parks.vic.gov.au

Ecology
- Forest cover: 55 m (180 ft)
- Dominant tree species: Conifer: Sequoia sempervirens; Pseudotsuga menziesii; Pinus radiata

Site notes
- Public access: Unrestricted

Victorian Heritage Register
- Official name: Cement Creek Plantation
- Type: Registered place
- Criteria: A, D, E, F, H
- Designated: 20 April 2023
- Reference no.: H2439
- Heritage overlay no.: HO353
- Category: Forestry and Timber Industry

Register of the National Estate
- Official name: Cement Creek Plantation
- Type: Defunct register
- Designated: undated
- Reference no.: 102678

The Cement Creek Plantation, also known as the Warburton Redwoods, is a 1.8-hectare (4-acre) conifer forest located on Cement Creek Road in East Warburton, in the Yarra Ranges, in the north eastern suburbs of Melbourne, in Victoria, Australia. Planned by the Melbourne & Metropolitan Board of Works as an hydrological experiment from the 1920s, it was deemed unsuccessful and largely abandoned in the 1980s.

Planted from 1929 on the traditional lands of the Wurundjeri people, the forest was added to the Victorian Heritage Register on 20 April 2023 in recognition of its historical and architectural significance; and was also added to non-statutory lists by the Victorian branch of the National Trust on 7 December 2009 and the now defunct Register of the National Estate on an unknown date.

The site is managed by Parks Victoria as part of the Yarra Ranges National Park.

== History ==
From 1891, the Melbourne & Metropolitan Board of Works (MMBW) was responsible for providing the vital public health services of sewerage and clean water supply for Melbourne. From the 1920s and 1930s, the MMBW was concerned that catchment areas had been degraded through decades of farming, fires, and logging of native forests. Areas cleared of native vegetation were overgrown with scrub and other weeds, such as blackberry. The planting of forests was an attempt to enhance water quality in catchment areas.

Following clearing of the original eucalypt forest, the Cement Creek Plantation was established as part of an extensive revegetation program and this experimental plantation tested the potential of conifer species to improve land and water quality, as well as for their commercial timber potential. Between 1929 and 1934, exotic conifers were progressively planted, basically as a weed control measure. The species that thrived included Bishop's pine (Pinus muricata), Douglas fir, and Californian Redwood (Sequoia sempervirens), and from the early 1960s, Pinus radiata and Western Red Cedar. The MMBW undertook an extensive regeneration program, particularly in areas that were failing to revegetate naturally through destruction by frequent fires.

By the 1960s and 1970s, it was the site of the MMBW’s hydrological research to establish the impact of commercial timber growing in catchment areas. Assessed in 1976, it was determined that the redwood species grew vigorously and that the Radiata pine was of poor quality. The conifer plantations effectively suppressed any understorey vegetation. Abandoned for this purpose from the 1980s and largely undisturbed until 2016, the plantation is one of the few places that demonstrates the MMBW and its scientific approaches to reforestation during the twentieth century.

== Description ==
The forest was planted from 1929 in thirteen plots that contained over 1,476 trees, with fixtures on some trees including collars and numbered metal tags that were originally used to collect runoff via a hose into a measuring drum. The extensive plantation contains plots of Californian Redwood (Sequoia sempervirens), Douglas fir (Pseudotsuga menziesii) and Pinus radiata, with access tracks intersecting the plantation.

The main aims of the research were to establish the relationship between vegetation type and water yield, and to evaluate the effect of forest operations on water yield and quality. Whilst the main focus was to establish data for different types of native forest catchment qualities, conifer plantations were included to give comparative data. The experiments undertaken at Coranderrk and Cement Creek included recording hydrological processes such as throughfall, stem flow and canopy interception. In all, the 1960s-70s program involving Cement Creek included five native forest communities and three conifer plantations.

Throughfall was measured by division of the plots into a square grid of 16 positions in each plot. All positions were numbered, troughs placed to collect throughfall, and measurements carried out weekly. Stemflow involved collecting water running down the stems of selected trees by a collar diverting water into a collection hose at the front, or by a spiral wound around the tree.

Although it may be considered a failure because scientific evidence demonstrates that native species, rather than non-native conifers, have greater ecological benefits for land and water quality, the design and planting of such an ambitious experimental plantation was a breakthrough for the 1920s and 1930s. The pairing of trees at the Cement Creek Plantation with those at Coranderrk for hydrological research in canopy interception was reported to be the longest in Victoria, and lasted for around ten years. As of 2023, the tree canopy ranged from approximately 20 to 55 metres (66 to 180 ft) tall with a girth of c.5.8 metres (19 ft).

Adjacent to the plantation is the Cement Creek caretaker's residence, a small fibro-cement cottage with corrugated cement sheet roofing.

== See also ==
- Redwoods of the Otway Ranges
- List of places on the Victorian Heritage Register in the Shire of Yarra Ranges
