= Millgrove, Victoria =

Millgrove
- Town
- Interactive map of Millgrove
- Coordinates: 37°45′11″S 145°39′07″E
- Country: Australia
- State: Victoria
- LGA: Shire of Yarra Ranges
- Location: 63 km (39 mi) from Melbourne; 4 km (2.5 mi) from Warburton

Government
  - State electorate: Eildon
  - Federal division: Casey
- Elevation: 367 m (1,204 ft)

Population
  - Total: 1,666 (2021 census)
- Postcode: 3799
Localities around Millgrove
| Wesburn | Warburton | Warburton |
| Wesburn | Millgrove | Warburton |
| Wesburn | Wesburn | Warburton |

Millgrove is a town in Victoria, Australia, located 63 kilometres (39 mi) east of Melbourne's central business district, located within the Shire of Yarra Ranges local government area. Millgrove recorded a population of 1,666 at the 2021 census.

== Overview ==
Millgrove is located on either side of the Warburton Highway, between Wesburn and Warburton.

The Post Office opened on 7 November 1906, four years after the opening of the town's railway station on 13 November 1901 on the Warburton line.

Millgrove remained a timber-milling and agricultural town, with occasional tourism and fishing, until the 1960s and 1970s. Despite the closure of the railway in 1965, cars placed Millgrove within acceptable commuting distances of larger towns.

Millgrove has a public reserve, a small shopping area (Mt Little Joe Nursery, a small general store, bakery, newsagent, fish and chips, church drop in centre), saw mill, a primary school, Millwarra PS, which shares campuses with Warburton East and a pre-school. There are two churches, Millgrove Baptist and River Valley Church of Christ. River Valley has a drop-in centre and emergency relief provision in the shopping strip and manages the Millwarra Community Building located at the school. The Community Building is a 300-seat auditorium and half court basketball stadium.

The former railway line is now a walking and cycling track.

A free community lunch (Good Tucker Day) is held in the reserve opposite the saw mill each Tuesday and there is a residents group (Millgrove Residents Action Group MRAG) as well as an environment group, MERG. Millgrove has an active and dedicated fire brigade (CFA). The fire station is opposite the saw mill and is also a purpose-built community fire refuge. Millgrove hosts a moving ANZAC Dawn service that attracts in excess of 500 people with breakfast provided by the Wesburn-Millgrove Fire Brigade.

Located beneath the forested mountains of Donna Buang, Ben Cairn and Mount Little Joe, near the Yarra River, Millgrove is a very scenic location. Often neglected by tourists (in favour of the larger, more affluent and tourist-oriented town of Warburton), it offers cycling, canoeing and bushwalking opportunities. It is also the location of Melbourne High School's school camps.

Together with Warburton, Millgrove has an Australian Rules football team (Warburton Millgrove) competing in the Yarra Valley Mountain District Football League and a junior soccer club and soccer ground next to the pre school.
