= Woori Yallock Creek =

Coordinates: 37°43′52″S 145°29′54″E

Location
- Country: Victoria, Australia

Woori Yallock Creek is a tributary of the Yarra River. It rises on the eastern slopes of the Dandenong Ranges, then flows north to join the Yarra River near Woori Yallock.

Tributaries of Woori Yallock Creek include Cockatoo, Shepherd, McCrae and Wandin Yallock creeks.

== See also ==
- Geography of the Yarra River
