= Stony Creek (Melbourne) =

Coordinates: 37°47′45″S 144°50′36″E

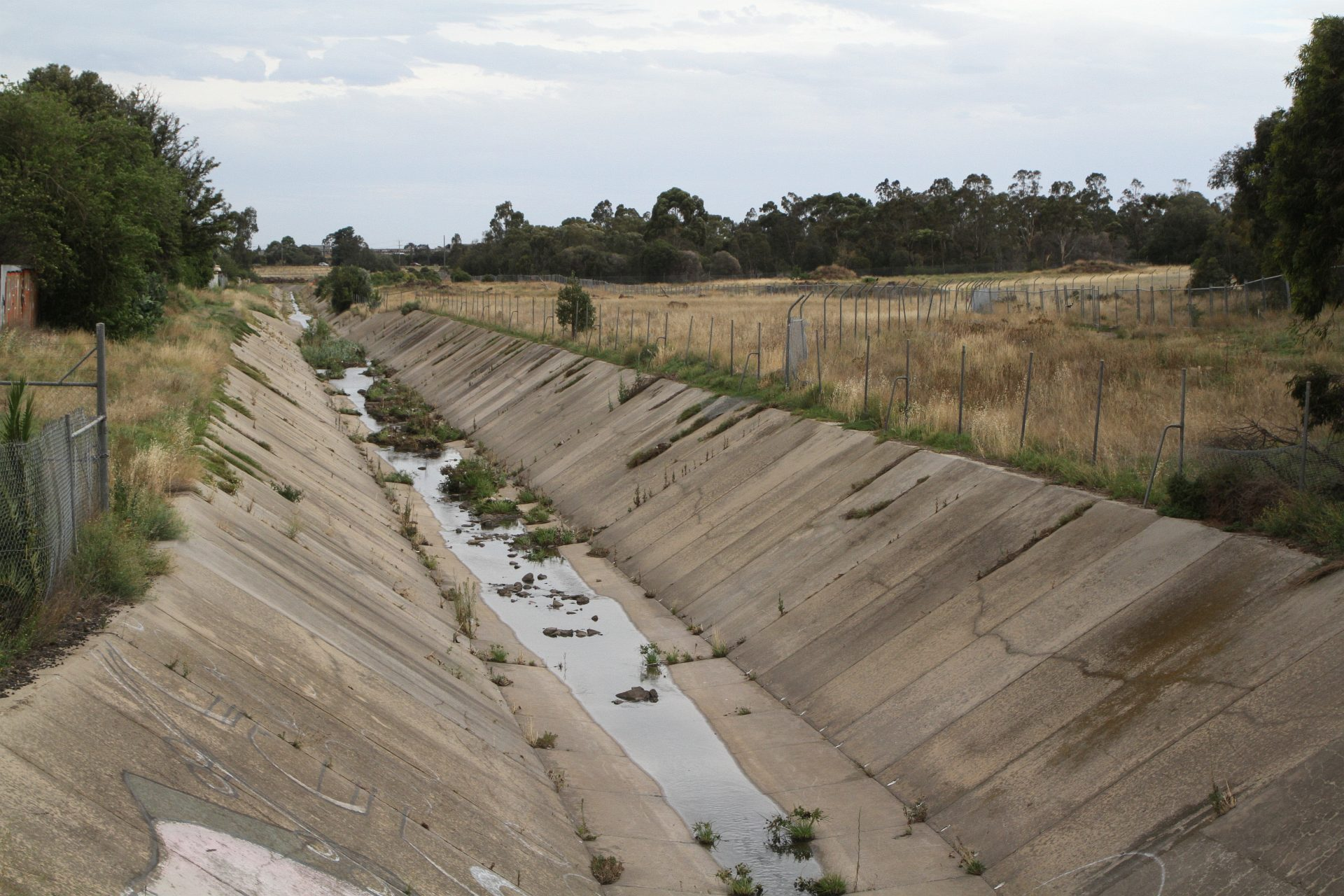
Stony Creek runs in a concrete channel through Sunshine North

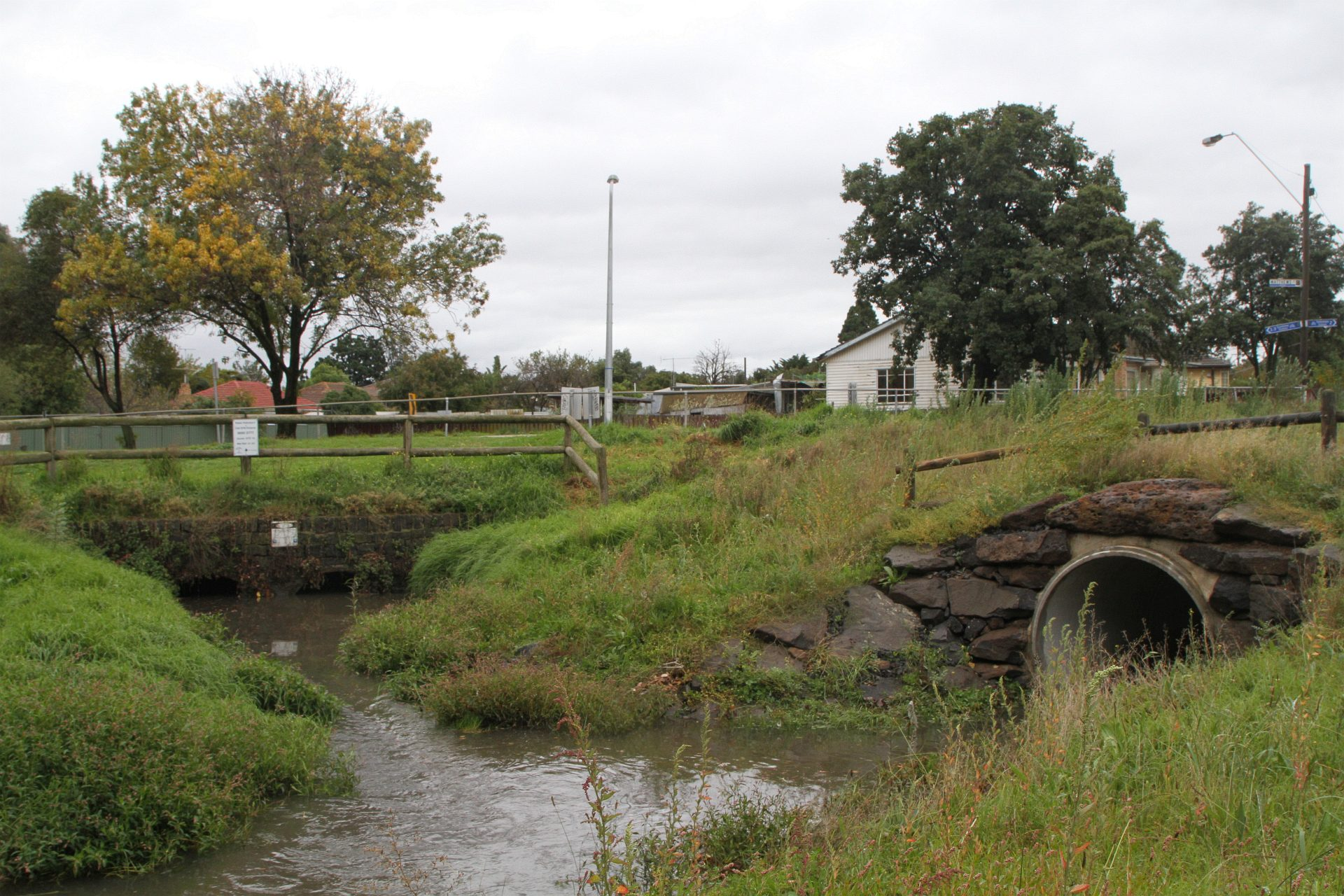
Stony Creek returns to ground level in Sunshine

Stony Creek is located in the western suburbs of Melbourne, Victoria, Australia. It runs through the suburbs of St Albans, Albion, Sunshine, Braybrook, Tottenham, Brooklyn, Kingsville and Yarraville.

As of 2011 in its upper reaches Stony Creek's environmental state is very poor; it is best characterised as a concrete stormwater drain for these sections of its course. Through most of Sunshine it has been directed underground coming out at Matthews Hill Reserve. It then becomes a pleasantly treelined creek before passing through heavily industrialised areas.

Stony Creek joins the Yarra River under the Westgate Bridge at the Stony Creek Backwash where it is fringed with mangroves.

The Friends of Stony Creek is a group that works to restore native vegetation and protect the area.

In April 2018, the Upper Stony Creek Transformation, a project to return a 1.2 km section of Stony Creek in Sunshine North to a natural, revegetated creek with vibrant community space and walking paths, commenced. This project is scheduled to be completed in September 2019.

In July 2019 the Upper Stony Creek Transformation Project came to a standstill after project costs blew out following the discovery of industrial contamination at the site.

In September 2019, the Stony Creek's water has turned blood red which authorities believed to be caused by a dye. The Environmental Protection Agency is still investigating the source of the discolouration.
