= Hödl =

Hödl is a German surname. Notable people with this surname include:

- Helmut Hödl (born 1968), Austrian clarinetist and composer
- Jacob Hödl (born 2007), Austrian footballer
- Marco Hödl (born 1997), Austrian footballer

== See also ==
- Hoddle
