= Hoddles Creek (tributary) =

Creek in Victoria, Australia

Coordinates: 37°46′16″S 145°34′12″E

Hoddles Creek is a creek near Melbourne in Victoria, Australia.

== Geography ==
The Hoddles Creek is a tributary of the Yarra River. It is located on the northwestern slopes of the Yarra Ranges. Its source is at the southern side of Sale Hill. It flows in a northwestern direction through the small towns of Hoddles Creek and Launching Place, until it reaches the Yarra River. This includes farmland and native vegetation.

== Melbourne Water ==
By the Water Act 1989, it became part of the Upper Yarra Catchment for Melbourne Water, the water system of Melbourne. In other words, some of its water is used for irrigation and drinking water in the city of Melbourne. Moreover, Melbourne Water monitors the flow of the stream at Launching Place, Victoria.

== Fishing ==
The creek may also be used recreationally to angle brown trout. In a study conducted in 1997, it was home to six species of fish. Since the advent of a fishway at Dights Falls, it has attracted more native fish species, like the spotted galaxias and the Australian grayling.
