= Hoddles Creek, Victoria =

Hoddles Creek
- Town
- Interactive map of Hoddles Creek
- Coordinates: 37.833°S 145.583°E
- Country: Australia
- State: Victoria
- LGA: Shire of Yarra Ranges
- Location: 66 km (41 mi) from Melbourne; 30 km (19 mi) from Belgrave; 18 km (11 mi) from Warburton

Government
  - State electorate: Eildon
  - Federal division: Casey
- Elevation: 212 m (696 ft)

Population
  - Total: 676 (2021 census)
- Postcode: 3139
Localities around Hoddles Creek
Launching Place	Gladysdale	Warburton
Yellingbo	Hoddles Creek	Noojee
Cockatoo	Gembrook	Labertouche

Hoddles Creek is a locality near Melbourne in Victoria, Australia, located within the Shire of Yarra Ranges local government area. Hoddles Creek recorded a population of 676 at the 2021 census.

== Location ==
Hoddles Creek is situated 72 km east of Melbourne's central business district. It stands on the banks of the Hoddles Creek, which was named after Robert Hoddle. Blackleather Creek also flows through the town.

== History ==
Hoddles Creek was named for Robert Hoddle (1794–1881), who surveyed the area in 1844. The town developed thanks to the Victorian Gold Rush in the 1860s. It was home to one of the largest minefields in Victoria up until the 1900s.

The Post Office opened as Hoddle's Creek on 24 May 1862 and closed 1865. It reopened in 1869 (though known as Warburton from 1874 until 1879) and closed in 1967.

In 1916, the Hoddles Creek Primary School was founded to replace other local schools. It still runs to this day.

Sir Harrie Massey, the renowned mathematical physicist, spent his early years from 1908 in Hoddles Creek.

It is home to several vineyards. For example, the Hoddles Creek Estate was founded by the D'Anna family in 1997. The town is also home to berry farms and tree farms.
