= Launching Place =

- Town
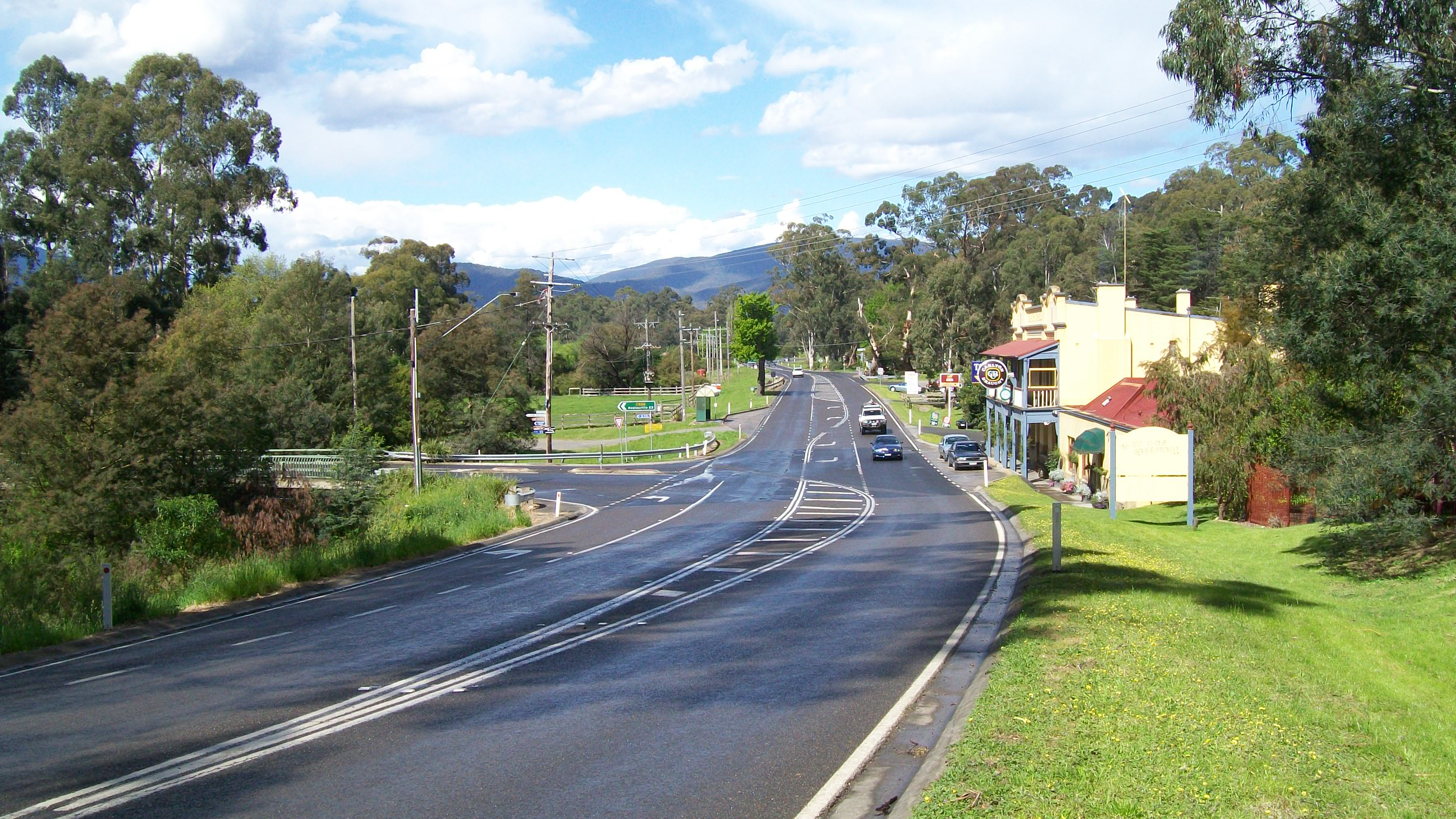
- Launching Place Hotel, Warburton Highway

- Interactive map of Launching Place
- Coordinates: 37.774°S 145.588°E
- Country: Australia
- State: Victoria
- LGA: Shire of Yarra Ranges
- Location: 60 km (37 mi) from Melbourne; 13 km (8.1 mi) from Warburton

Government
  - State electorate: Eildon
  - Federal division: Casey

Population
  - Total: 2,495 (2021 census)
- Postcode: 3139
Localities around Launching Place
Woori Yallock	Don Valley	Yarra Junction
Woori Yallock	Launching Place	Gladysdale
Hoddles Creek	Hoddles Creek	Hoddles Creek

Launching Place is a town in Victoria, Australia, 54 km east of Melbourne's central business district, located within the Shire of Yarra Ranges local government area. Launching Place recorded a population of 2,495 at the 2021 census.

Launching Place is located along the Warburton Highway between Woori Yallock and Yarra Junction. It is believed that Launching Place is named after the place on the Yarra River where freshly cut logs were "launched" into the river to be floated down to sawmills in Melbourne.

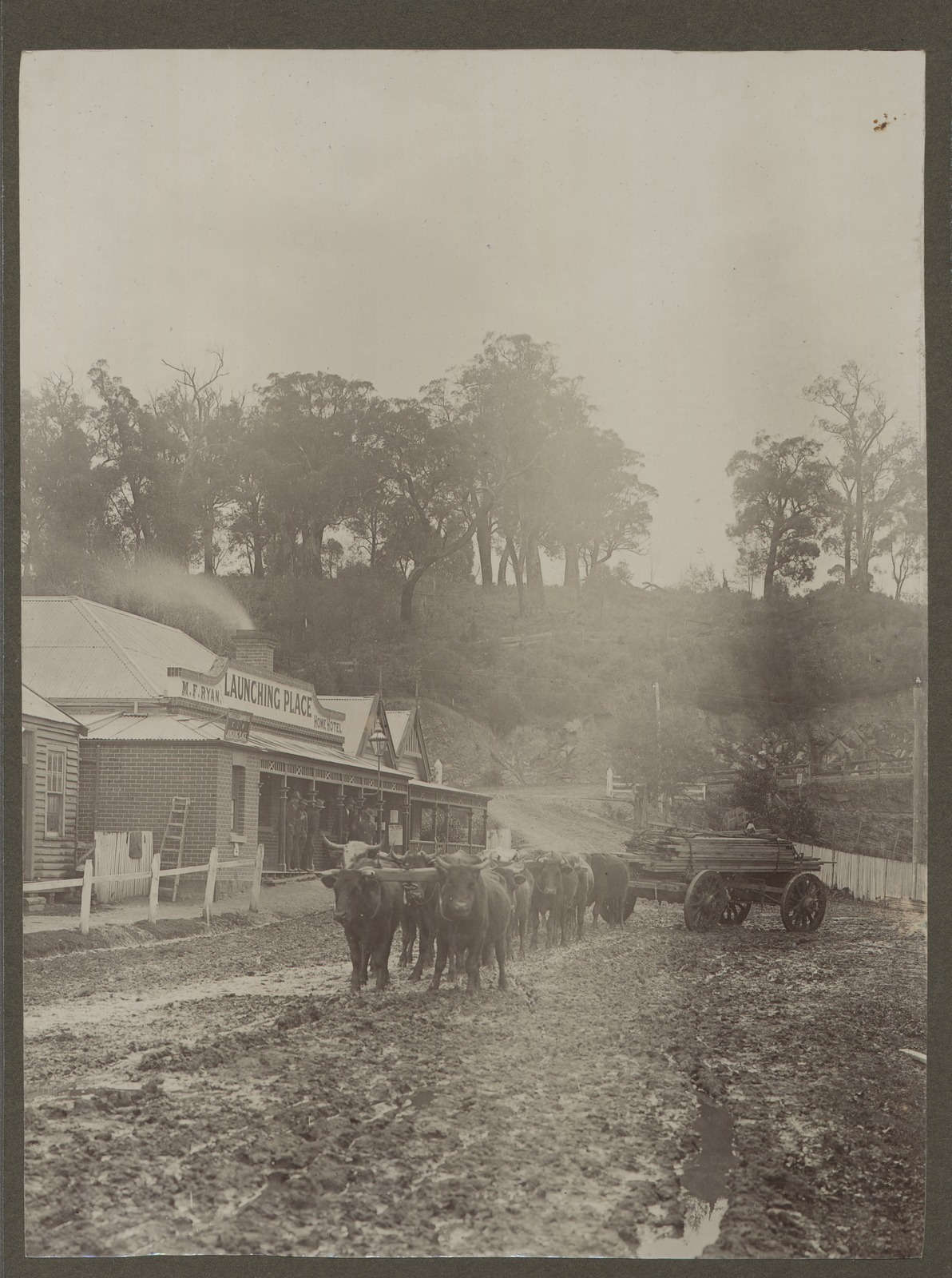
Launching Place, between 1898 and 1918 State Library Victoria H33027/9b

A post office opened on 12 July 1865. It was replaced by one at Hoddles Creek in 1869, but reopened on 1 September 1880, finally closing in 1994.

From 1901 to 1965, the township was served by a railway station on the Warburton line.

Launching Place has many camping grounds, and people use it was a base for camping, hiking and boating in the Yarra River.

The Derelict Aircraft Museum was formerly located in Launching Place but, by 2017, it had been closed and dismantled.

A new car park has recently been constructed behind the Launching Place General Store, improving access to the Warburton Rail Trail and the store.

== Gallery ==
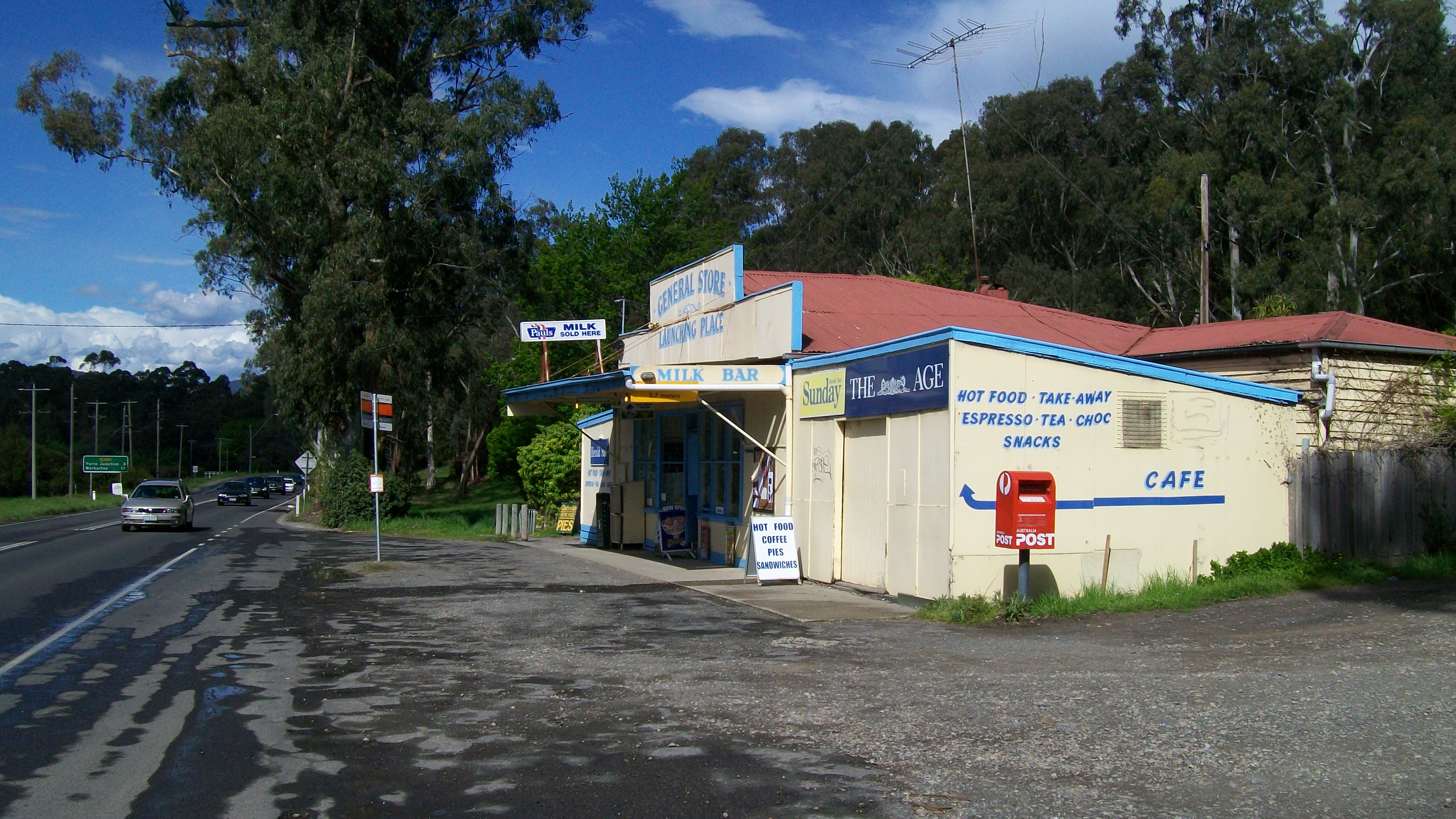
Launching Place General Store

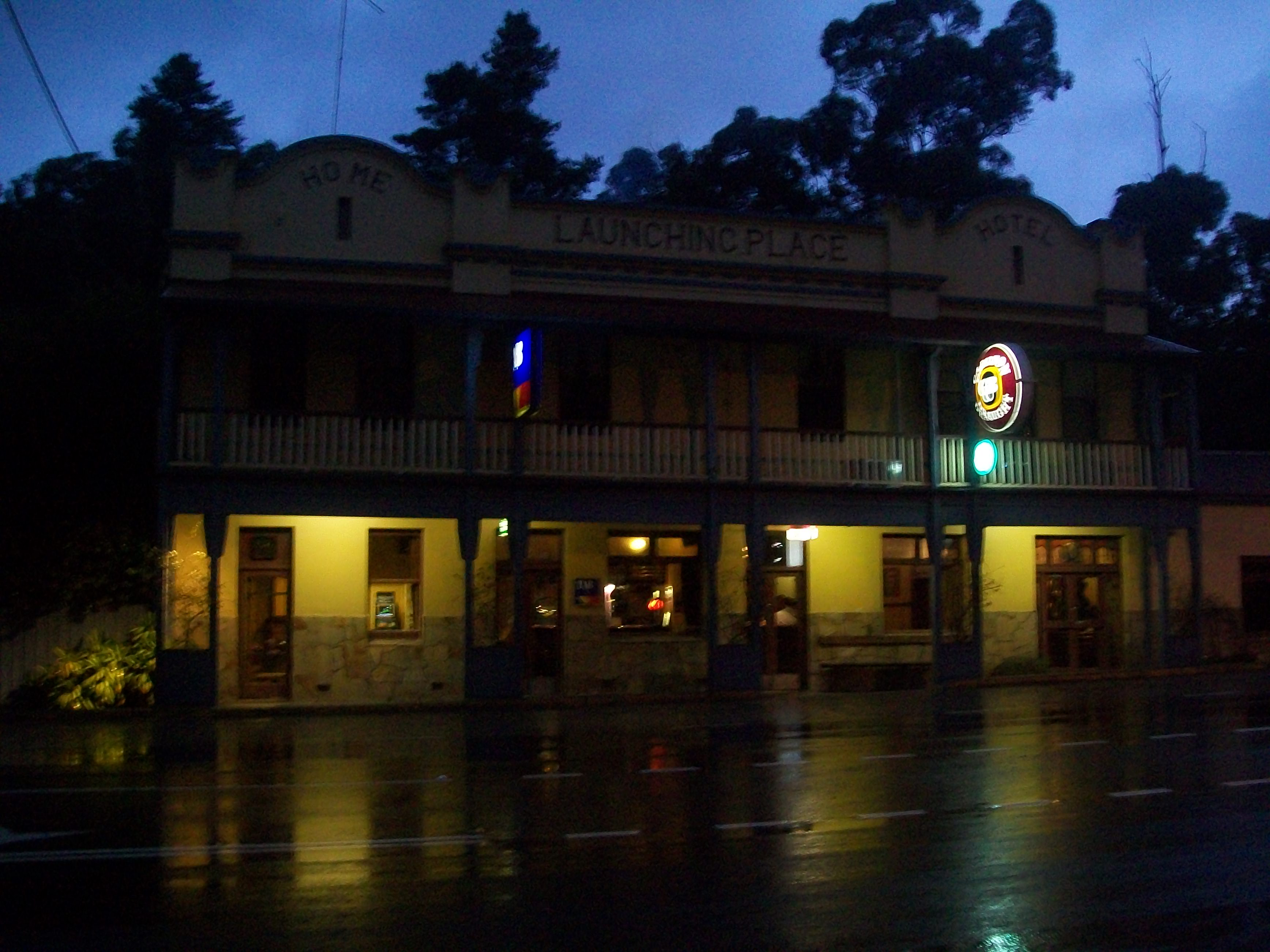
Launching Place Home Hotel
