= Gladysdale =

- Town
- Interactive map of Gladysdale
- Coordinates: 37°49′S 145°39′E
- Country: Australia
- State: Victoria
- LGA: Shire of Yarra Ranges

Government
  - State electorate: Eildon
  - Federal division: Division of Casey

Population
  - Total: 423 (2021 census)
- Postcode: 3797

Gladysdale is a locality in Victoria, Australia, on the Yarra Junction Noojee Road, located within the Shire of Yarra Ranges local government area. Gladysdale recorded a population of 423 at the 2021 census.

== History ==
Gladysdale Post Office opened on 17 July 1914 and closed in 1978. Originally called "Slatey Creek" but was renamed as mail kept going to Slatey Creek up near St Arnaud Victoria. It was renamed after Gladys Petitt, the daughter of the post mistress at the time. The post office was first run by the Victorian Hardwood company, who had the contract for the mail along the tramway at the time. The tram line ran from Powelltown to Yarra Junction.

Petitt Lane in Gladysdale is named after the Petitt family who owned land in that area at the time. The Lloyds brought land from them for their Sawmill. Ernest Lloyd, a saw miller who also served on council for many years, was also the president of the Gladysdale cricket club and Yarra Junction Football Club. The Club donated the land for an oval and reserve, and is now named after him. Just south of the reserve is the site of the tram way stop "Siding No 1" which open in 1913 but was closed by 1920. (exact reason and date is unknown).
