= Warburton, Victoria =

Warburton
- Town
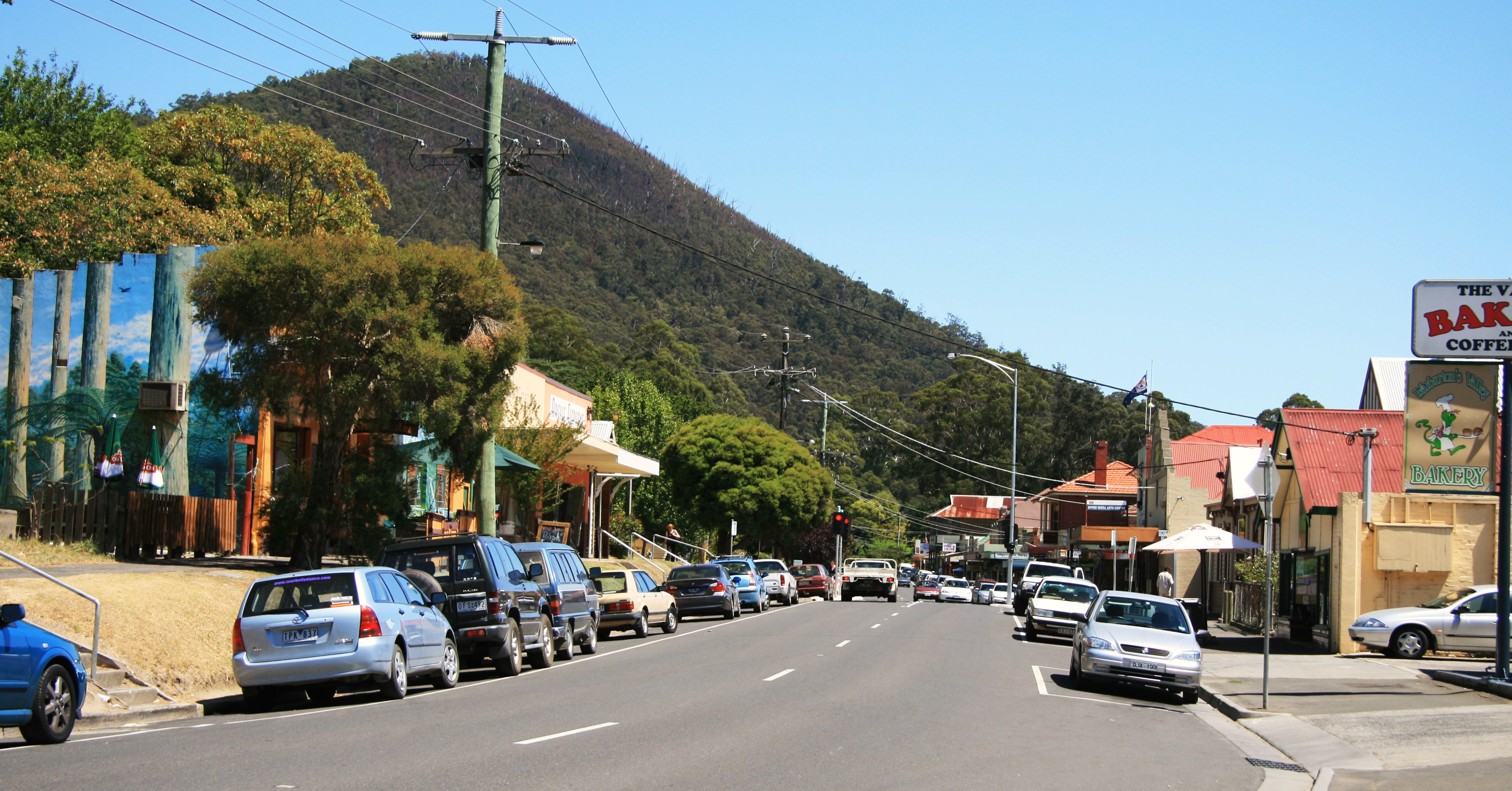
- Main Street, Warburton

- Interactive map of Warburton
- Coordinates: 37.755°S 145.697°E
- Country: Australia
- State: Victoria
- City: Melbourne
- LGA: Shire of Yarra Ranges
- Location: 76 km (47 mi) E of Melbourne CBD

Government
  - State electorate: Eildon
  - Federal division: Casey

Area
  - Total: 132.6 km^{2} (51.2 sq mi)
- Elevation: 159 m (522 ft)

Population
  - Total: 2,020 (2021 census)
  - Density: 15.23/km^{2} (39.46/sq mi)
- Postcode: 3799
Localities around Warburton
Healesville	Yarra Junction	East Warburton
Millgrove	Warburton	East Warburton & Big Pats Creek
Wesburn	Three Bridges & Powelltown	East Warburton

Warburton is a town in Victoria, Australia, 76 kilometres (47 miles) east of Melbourne's central business district, located within the Shire of Yarra Ranges local government area. Warburton recorded a population of 2,020 at the 2021 census.

== History ==
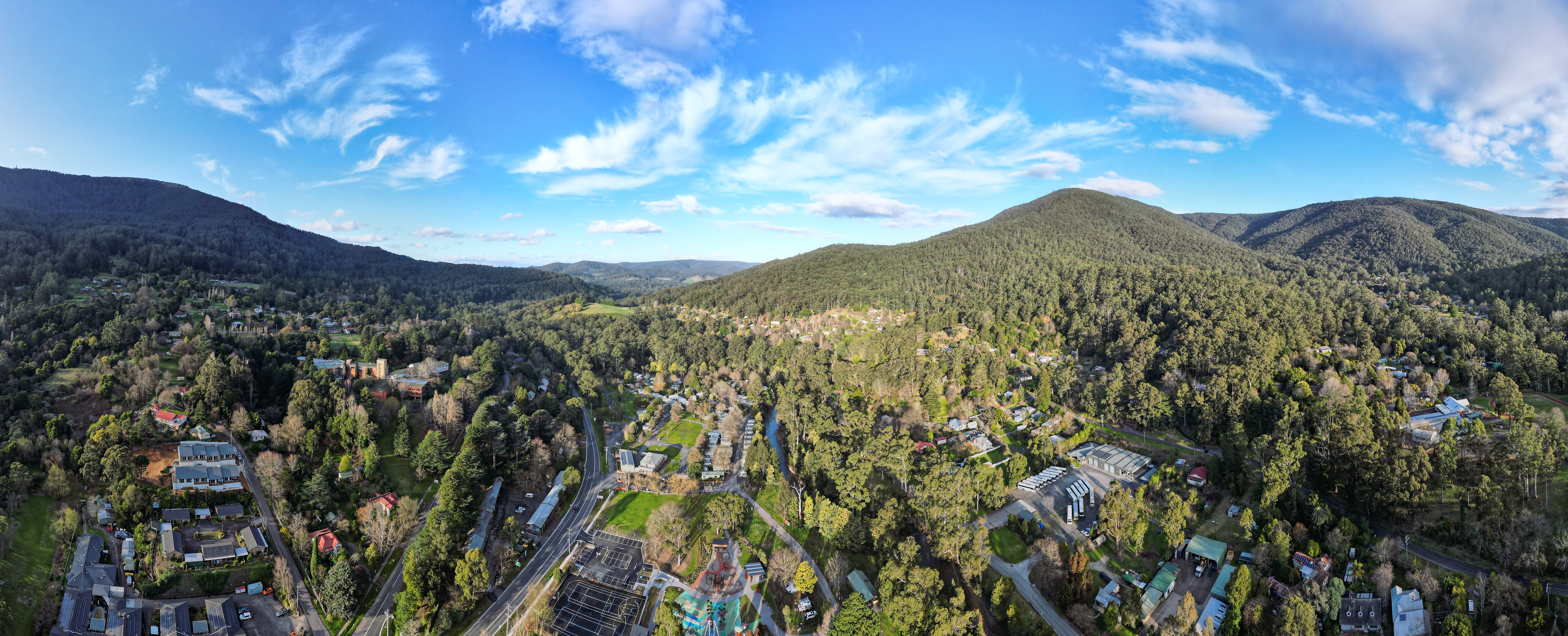
Warburton Aerial Panorama 20 August 2022

The name "Warburton" has been shared between two townships over the years. The mining town of "Yankee Jim's Creek" was located on the gold-bearing slopes of Mount Little Joe. Hostile terrain, fire, drought, flood, steep slopes, unsustainable roads, crime and easier pickings for miners further upstream put an end to "Old Warburton". Land was surveyed and sold in the valley below in 1884.

The Post Office opened around 1884. Two earlier offices named Warburton were renamed as Launching Place and Hoddle's Creek.

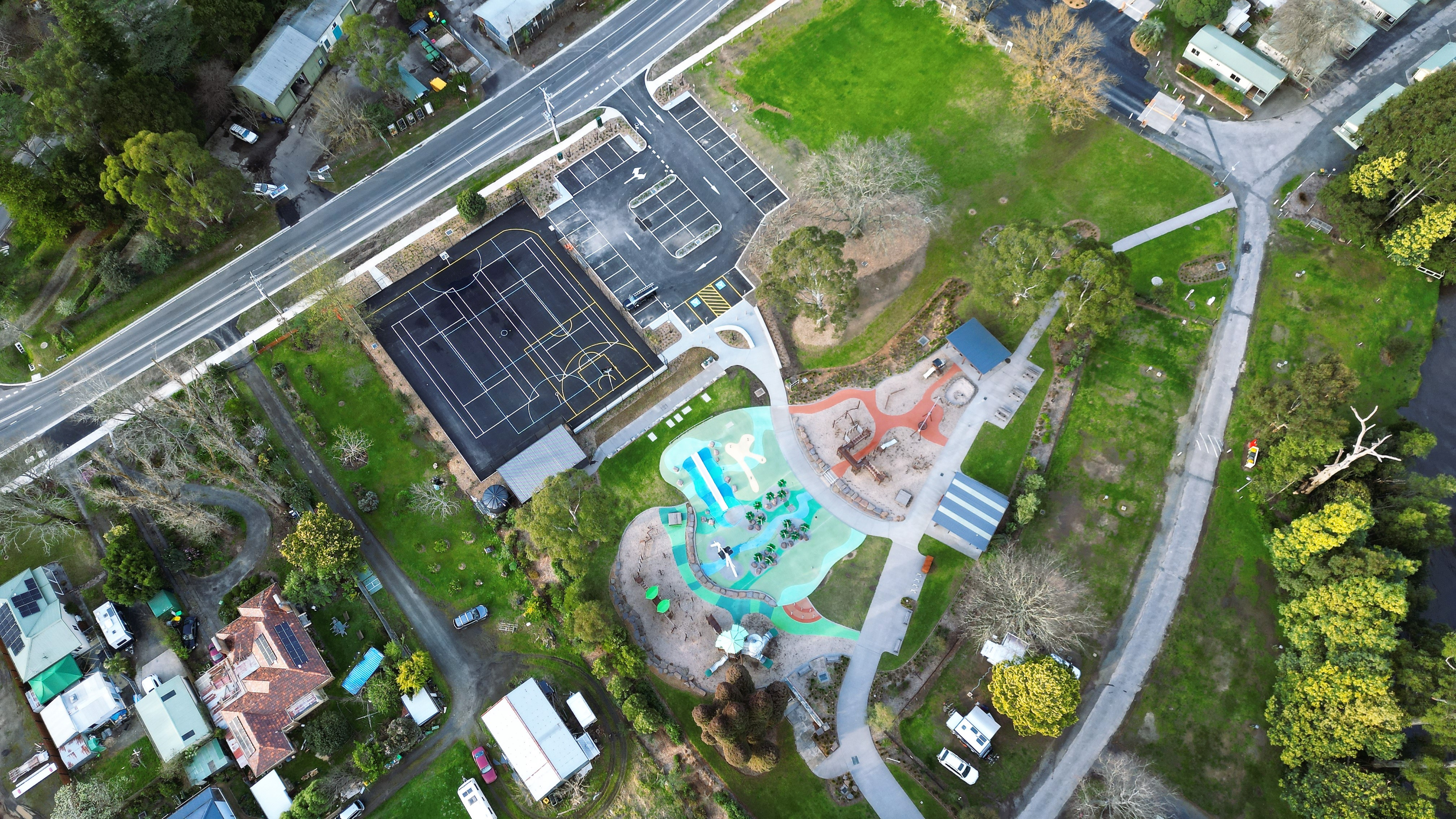
Warburton Water World from above. 20 August 2022

Warburton was connected to Lilydale by a Victorian Railways branch line, which was closed in 1965. The railway path is now used for the Lilydale to Warburton Rail Trail, a rail trail used by pedestrians, cyclists, and horse-riders.

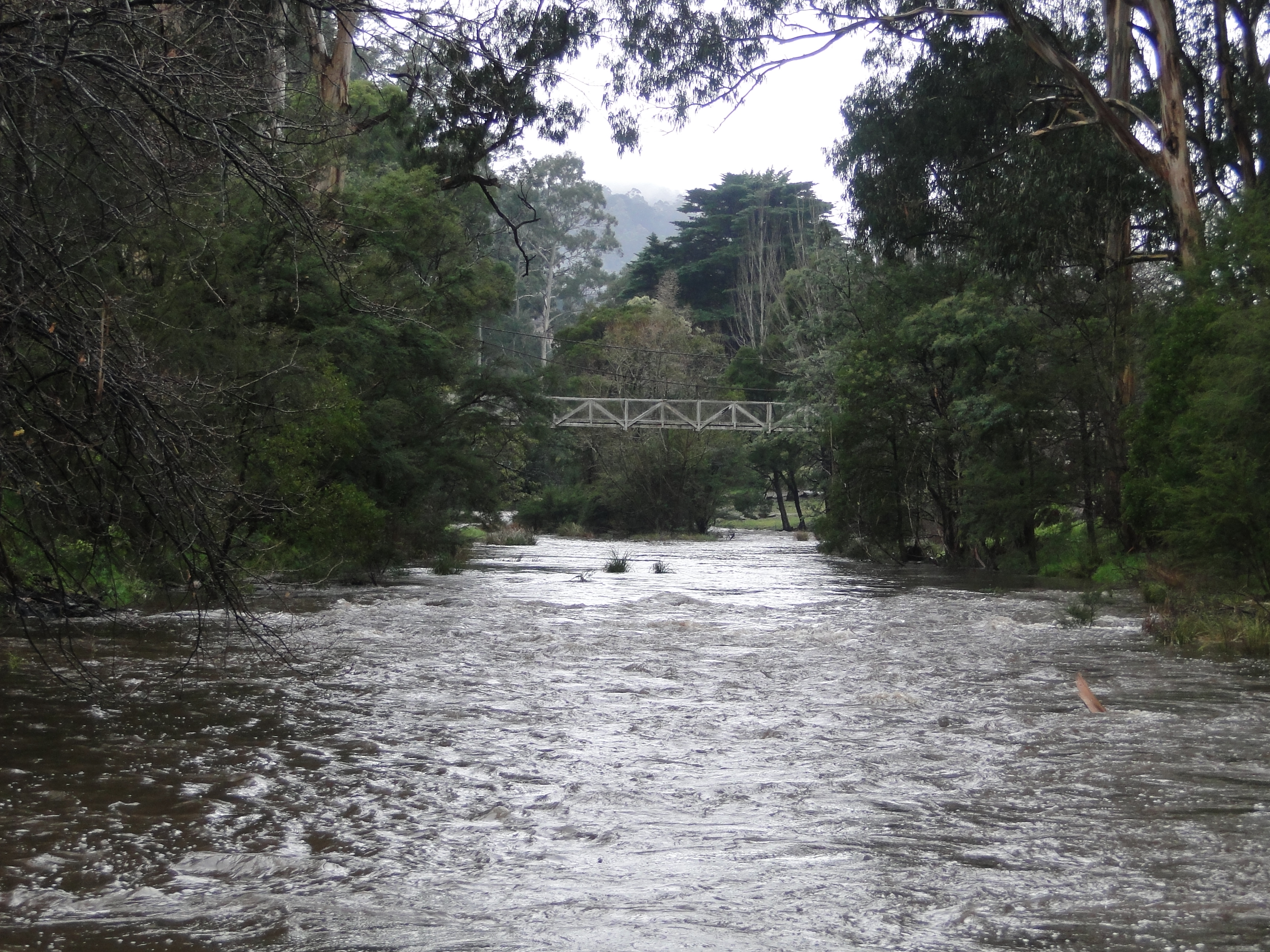
The Yarra River at Warburton

East of Warburton is a large water catchment area called Upper Yarra Dam, which is designed to supply Melbourne with water sourced from the Thomson catchment area. Robert Hoddle first surveyed this area in 1845 after persistent overwhelming floods impeded the development of the city of Melbourne.

Warburton was named after the middle name of unpopular goldfields Police Magistrate for Castlemaine, Charles Warburton Carr by District Surveyor Clement Hodgkinson during the 1860s. It received an official title in 1884. Hodgkinson became Australia's Father of Forestry. Carr was confronted with a population explosion upon opening of the Yarra goldfields in 1859 amid economic depression and was honoured for dutiful administration of the law despite public protests against him. Carr was also Secretary to the Government Inquiry into the Eureka Stockade 3 December 1854 at Ballarat. Charles Warburton Carr never lived in Warburton, he lived in Avoca.

Hodgkinson's good friend, Gold Commissioner for Bendigo and Magistrate for the Yarra Valley, Joseph Panton, named Mt Donna Buang above Warburton in 1865. The sketch map of the upper Yarra water and new bridle track to Woods Point, from Lillydale to Traveller's rest on great mountain road, lithographed at Office of Lands and Survey, 11 Sept. 1865, is available online at the State Library of Victoria. In a letter to The Argus 1 July 1911, Panton stated, "having ascertained from the chief and head of the aboriginal tribe of the Yering valley that the mountain was known as 'Donna Buang' I at once entered that name. My map was published by the Crown Lands department on the original scale of two miles to the inch." Panton was Colonel Anderson's nephew; both good friends with Melbourne Botanic Gardens creator Baron Von Mueller and Hodgkinson.

The last major town before Warburton, Lilydale, has similar polar histories, an evidence base that shows that Hodgkinson named the town after Lilly de Castella, daughter of Lieutenant-Colonel Joseph Anderson who served as one of the first nominated members of the Victorian Legislative Assembly in the 1850s, and another history, proposes it was named by public servant clerk John Hardy who heard convicts singing when building a road. The town attracted the wealth of Federation tourism at the turn of the 20th century. It was a honeymoon town.

=== Heritage listing ===
The following place in Warburton is listed on the Victorian Heritage Register:

- Sanitarium Health Food and Signs Publishing Company buildings, 51 Main Street

== Sport ==
Golfers play at the course of the Warburton Golf Club on Dammans Road.

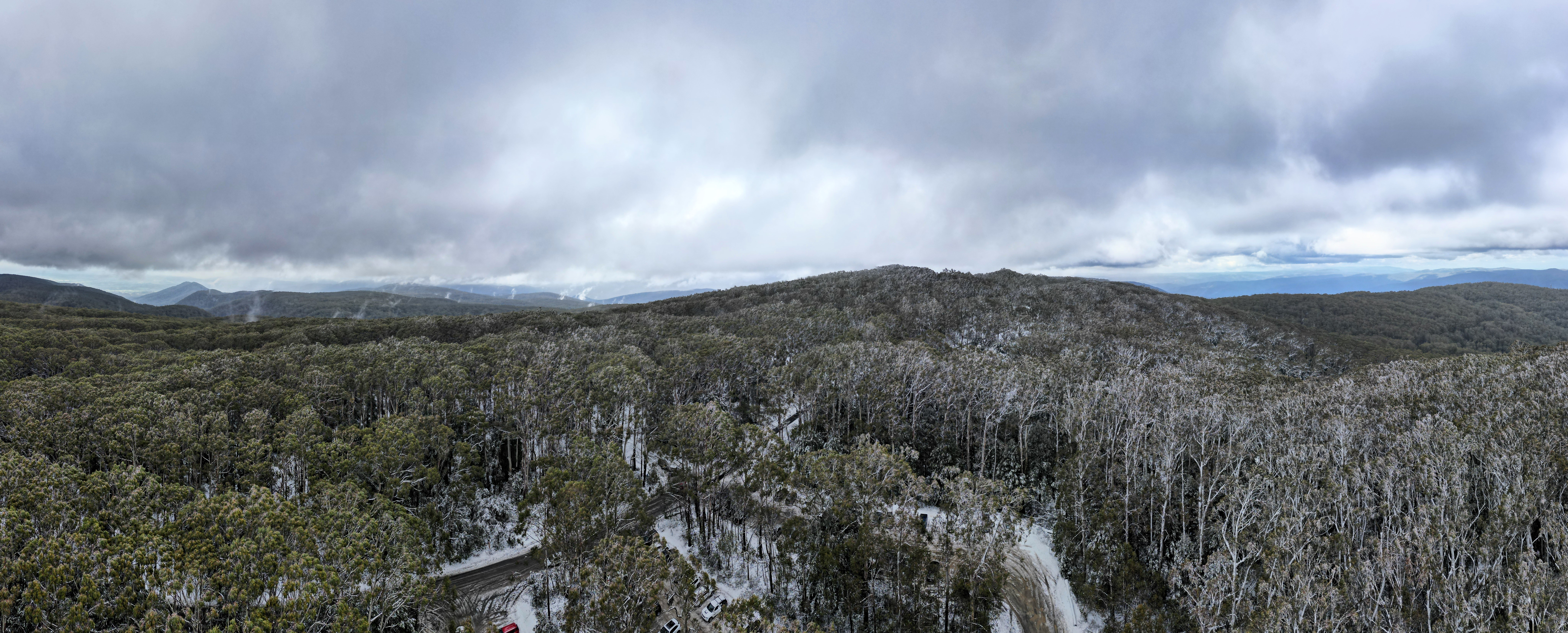
Aerial panorama of Mount Donna Buang. Flurry of snow in early spring. Shot on 9 September 2023.

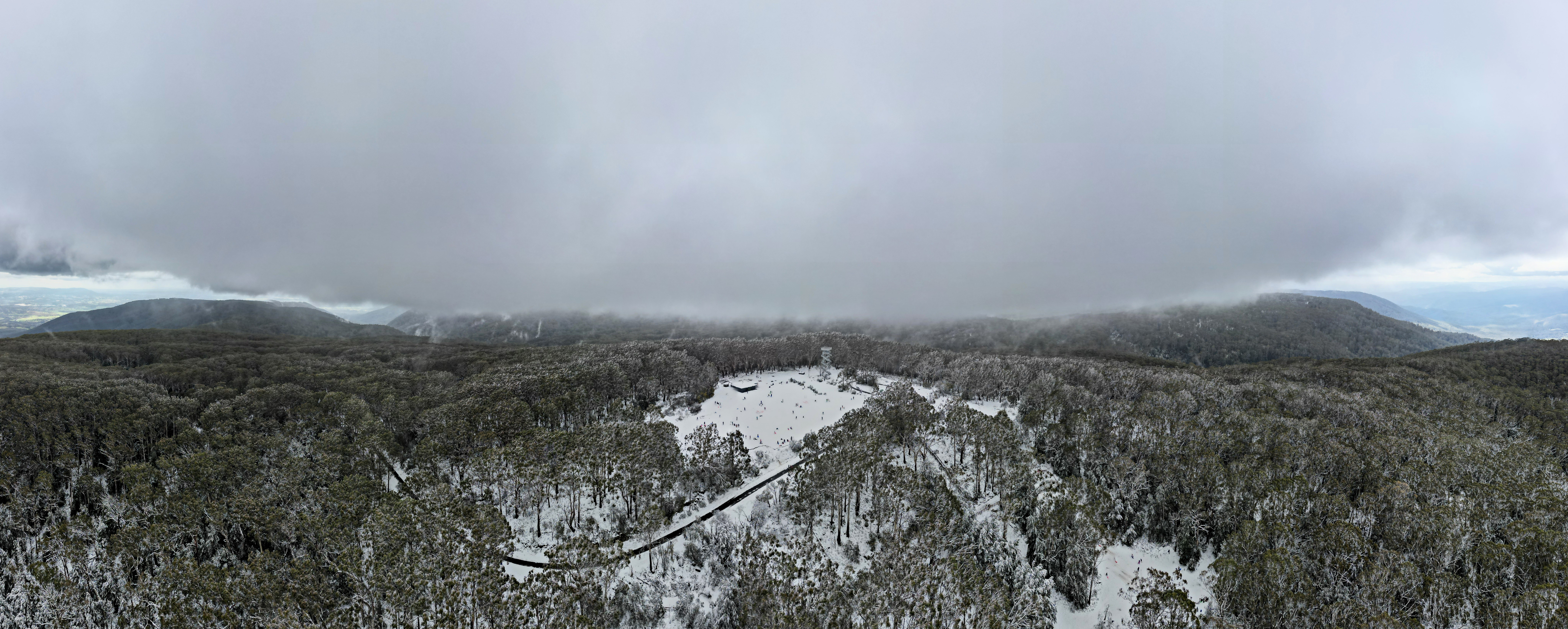
Aerial panorama of Mount Donna Buang's observation tower. Post-winter snow. Shot on 9 September 2023.

Together with its neighbouring township Millgrove, Warburton has an Australian Rules football team (Warburton Millgrove) competing in the Yarra Valley Mountain District Football League.

== Notable people ==
- Jon Johanson (1956–), aviator
- Lindsay Thompson (1923–2008), politician
- Diana Trask (1940–), country singer
- Jo Kennedy, (1962-), actress
- Timothy James Webb (1967–), artist

== See also ==
- Warburton railway station
