= The Island, Thompson Bend, Warrandyte =

Island in Victoria, Australia

Coordinates: 37°44′13″S 145°13′42″E

The Island is located at Thompson Bend on the Yarra River at Warrandyte, Victoria, Australia, approximately 24 kilometres (15 mi) north-east of Melbourne. It was created by gold miners in 1859–60, during the Victorian gold rush. They dug a diversion channel to alter the course of the Yarra River, providing access to the alluvial gold in the exposed river bed. The canal was widened by subsequent flooding becoming the main river course, with the previous river bed becoming a willow-choked backwater.

Mining Registrars and Surveyors Reports for the St. Andrews Division date the diversion of the river into a canal as May–July 1859. The work cost £7,000. There was more work in November 1859 and February 1860.

The nearby Pound Bend Tunnel was cut for a similar purpose in 1870. Two other tunnels, the Big Peninsula Tunnel and the Little Peninsula Tunnel, were dug further upstream in the 1860s.

The site is listed in the Victorian Heritage Inventory.
