= Pound Bend Tunnel =

Coordinates: 37°44′20″S 145°12′00″E

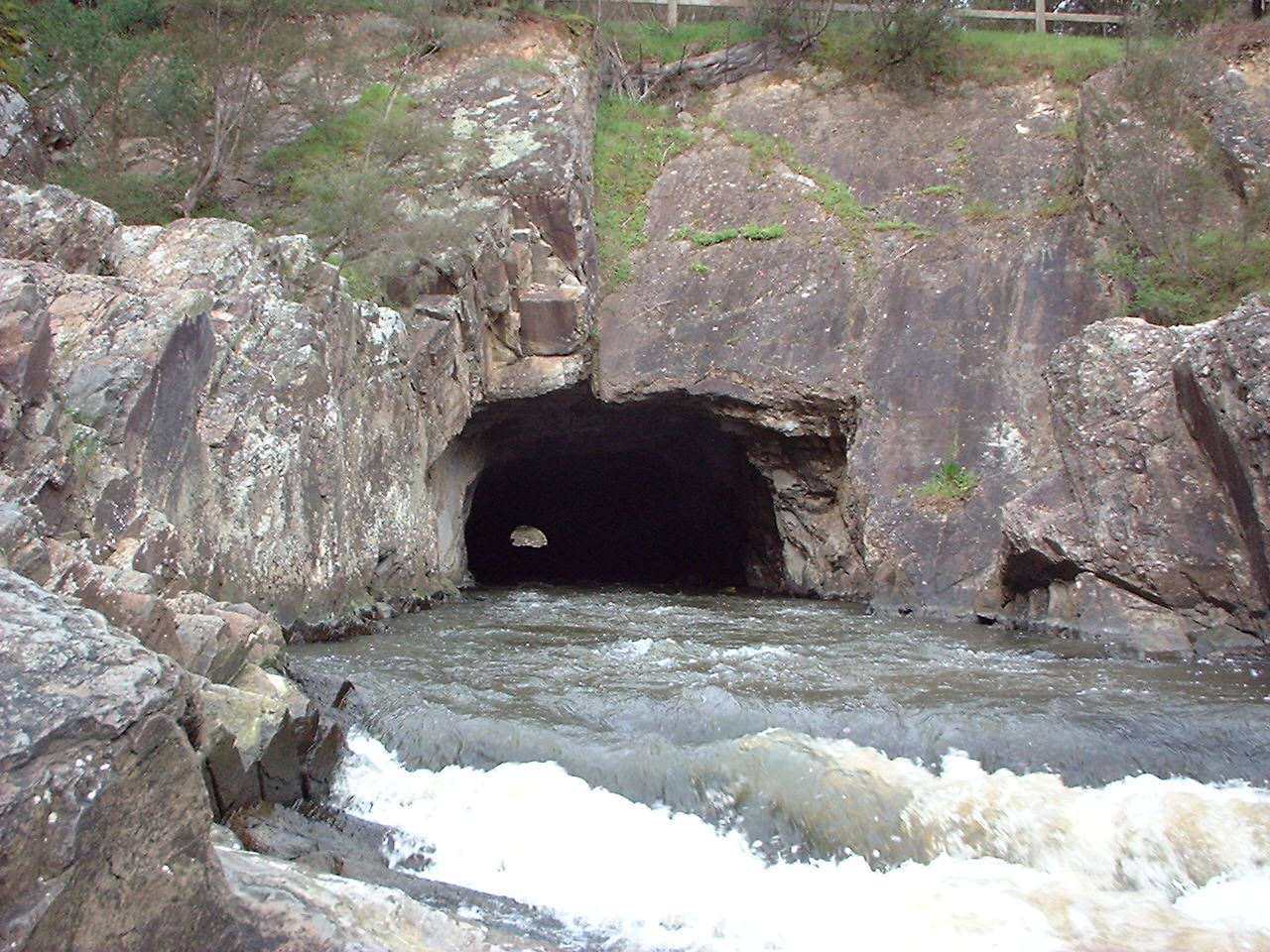
The Pound Bend Tunnel

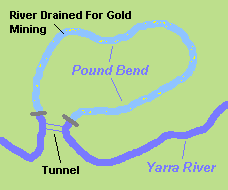
Map of the Pound Bend diversion tunnel

The Pound Bend Tunnel, or the Evelyn Tunnel, is a diversion tunnel on the Yarra River at Warrandyte, Victoria, Australia, approximately 24 km north-east of Melbourne. The tunnel is 145 metres long, six metres wide and four metres deep.

The tunnel is in the Pound Bend section of the Warrandyte State Park.

== History ==
The Evelyn Tunnel Mining Company, a public company, was formed on 8 February 1870. The object was to create a tunnel through the narrow section where the Yarra River turns back on itself and divert the river through it. This left five kilometres of river bed which could be mined for alluvial gold. The returns approximated the costs involved, the company never paid a dividend and was wound up in September 1872.

In 1884 the idea of using the tunnel to generate electricity was proposed, and in 1888 a company was formed for that purpose. The Melbourne Water Power Co. aimed to supply power to all of Melbourne from the scheme, but the venture did not proceed. The idea arose again in the 1920s, this time to supply the Warrandyte community, which was not able to fund the provision of power through the State Electricity Commission of Victoria.

The nearby diversion channel at The Island was cut for a similar purpose in 1859. There are similar tunnels on the upper Yarra River at Big Peninsula and Little Peninsula between Warburton and McMahons Creek, and on other Victorian rivers.

The site persists in local memory and legend as one of various deadly accidents. Due to the river's strong currents and the tunnel often trapping fallen branches creating a hazard, as well as frequent flooding causing the tunnel to fill with water, it has become a dangerous and often fatal place to swim or fall into, with a death occurring at the site in November 2004.

The site is listed on the Victorian Heritage Register and is included in a Heritage Overlay.

== Gallery ==
Outlet view looking upstream

Rockface viewed from inside the tunnel

Inside the tunnel looking downstream

Outlet view from cliff above

Looking upstream from inside the tunnel
