= List of places on the Victorian Heritage Register in the City of Manningham =

This is a list of places on the Victorian Heritage Register in the City of Manningham in Victoria, Australia. The Victorian Heritage Register is maintained by the Heritage Council of Victoria.

Place name	Place #	Location	Suburb or Town	Co-ordinates	Built	State registered	Photo
Friedensruh	H0376	10 Waldau Court	Doncaster	37.779170°S 145.142500°E	1853	23 April 1976	
Heide I	H0687	5 Templestowe Road	Bulleen	37.759040°S 145.083980°E	1870	18 May 1988	
Warrandyte Wine Hall	H1150	232-236 Yarra Street	Warrandyte	37.737260°S 145.223010°E	1890	18 April 1996	
Pound Bend Tunnel	H1260	Pound Bend Road	Warrandyte	37.738840°S 145.201950°E	1870	19 December 1996	
Solar House	H1312	32 Rosco Drive	Templestowe	37.752630°S 145.162640°E	1978	8 May 1997	
Inge and Grahame King House	H1313	18 Drysdale Road	Warrandyte	37.748980°S 145.204930°E	1951	8 May 1997	
Naughton House and Factory	H1314	7-15 Hutchinson Avenue	Warrandyte	37.742030°S 145.199160°E	1946	8 May 1997	
Winter Park Cluster Housing	H1345	137-149 High Street	Doncaster	37.777790°S 145.112410°E	1970	20 November 1997	
Pontville Homestead	H1395	16-20 Webster Road	Templestowe	37.739680°S 145.166230°E	1843	11 December 1997	
Heide II	H1494	7 Templestowe Road	Bulleen	37.757320°S 145.083100°E	1965	18 May 1988	
Menlo	H2294	17-25 Atkinson Street	Templestowe	37.753130°S 145.121400°E	1933	5 April 2012	
