= Yarra River =

River in Victoria, Australia

Yarra
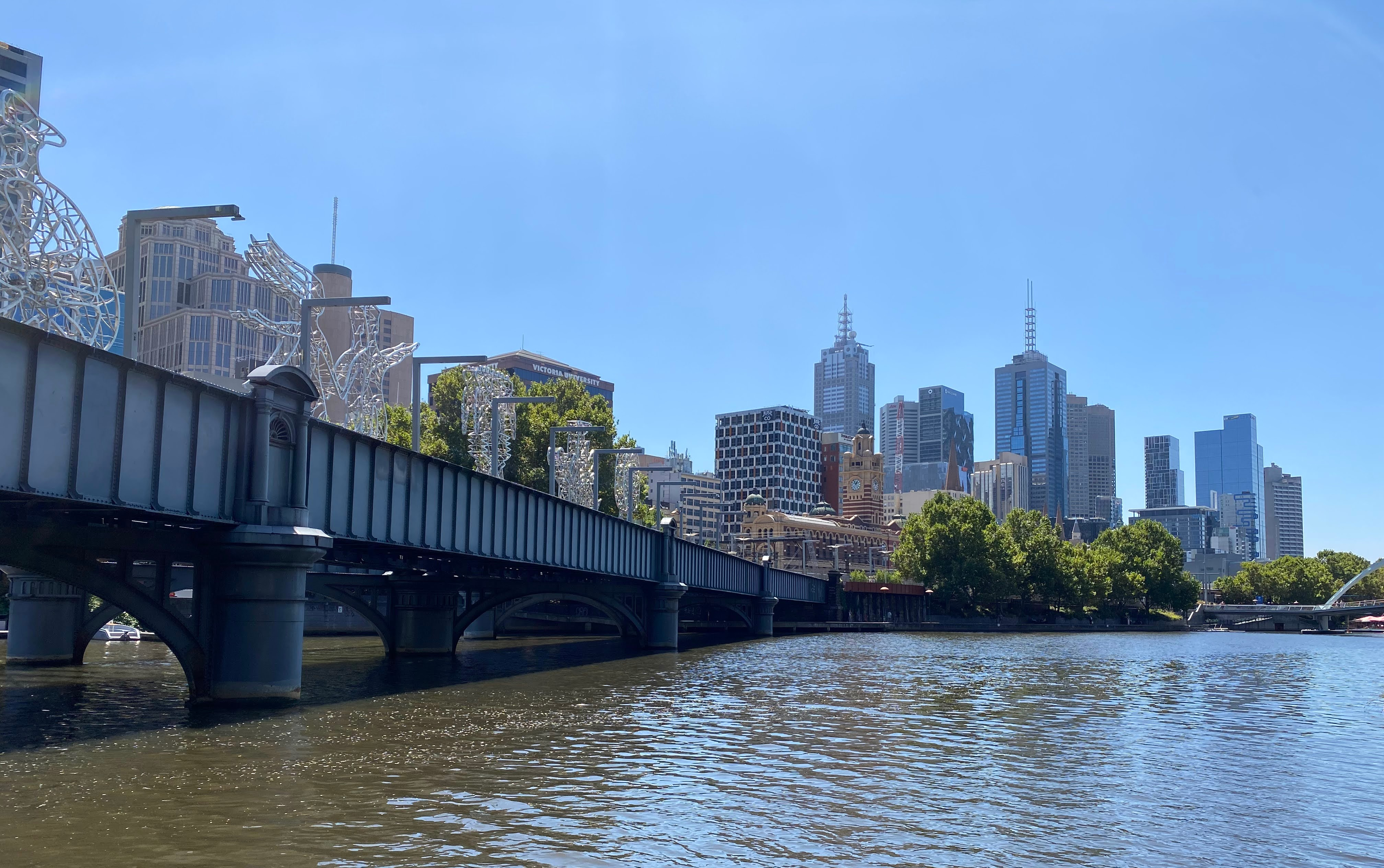
- The Yarra River in Melbourne CBD, 2023

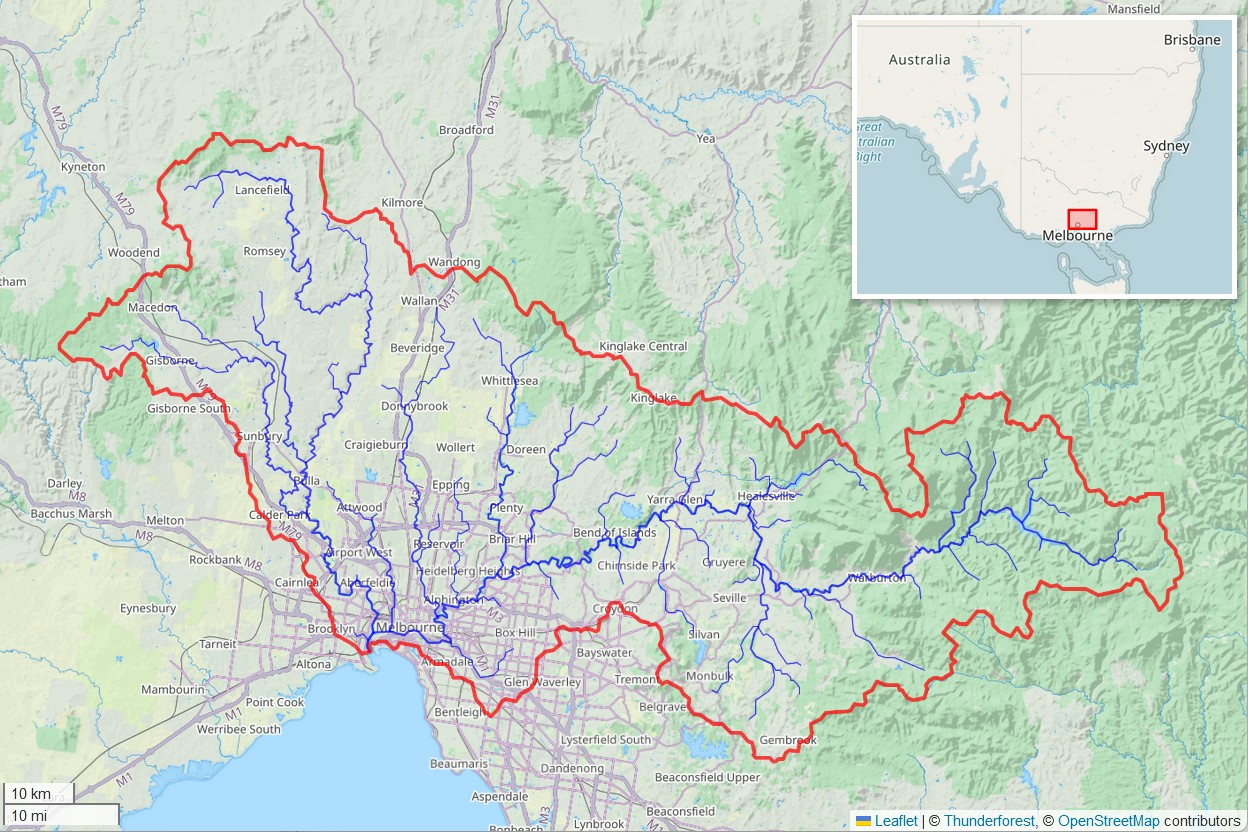
- Yarra River watershed (Interactive map)

- Location of the mouth of the Yarra River in Victoria
- Etymology: Bunwurrung (Aboriginal Australian languages): Yarro-yarro, "ever-flowing"
- Nickname: The Yarra
- Native name: Birrarung (Kulin languages)

Location
- Country: Australia
- State: Victoria
- Region: South Eastern Highlands (IBRA), Central Victoria
- LGA: City of Hobsons Bay; City of Port Phillip; City of Melbourne; City of Yarra; City of Darebin; City of Boroondara; City of Banyule; City of Manningham; Shire of Nillumbik; Yarra Ranges Shire
- City: Melbourne

Physical characteristics
- Source: Yarra Ranges, Great Dividing Range
  - location: within Yarra Ranges National Park
  - coordinates: 37°44′57″S 146°8′26″E
  - elevation: 792 m (2,598 ft)
- Mouth: Hobsons Bay, Port Phillip
  - location: near the suburb of Port Melbourne
  - coordinates: 37°51′7″S 144°54′30″E
  - elevation: 0 m (0 ft)
- Length: 242 km (150 mi)
- Basin size: 5,464.4 km^{2} (2,109.8 mi^{2})
- Discharge
  - location: Near mouth
  - average: 63.5 m^{3}/s (2,000 GL/a)

Basin features
- River system: Port Phillip catchment
- Tributaries
  - left: Maribyrnong River, Moonee Ponds Creek, Merri Creek, Darebin Creek, Plenty River, Diamond Creek, Steeles Creek, Watts River, Badger Creek, Don River, Cement Creek, O'Shannassy River
  - right: Gardiners Creek, Glass Creek, Koonung Creek, Mullum Mullum Creek, Andersons Creek, Jumping Creek, Olinda Creek, Woori Yallock Creek, Hoddles Creek, Little Yarra River, Starvation Creek
- National park: Yarra Ranges NP, Royal Botanic Gardens

The Yarra River or historically, the Yarra Yarra River, (Kulin languages: Berrern, Birr-arrung, Bay-ray-rung, Birarang, Birrarung, and Wongete) is a perennial river in south-central Victoria, Australia.

The lower stretches of the Yarra are where Victoria's state capital Melbourne was established in 1835, and today metropolitan Greater Melbourne dominates and influences the landscape of its lower reaches. From its source in the Yarra Ranges, it flows 242 kilometres (150 mi) west through the Yarra Valley, which opens out into plains as it winds its way through Greater Melbourne before emptying into Hobsons Bay in northernmost Port Phillip Bay.

The river has been a major food source and meeting place for Indigenous Australians for thousands of years. Shortly after the arrival of European settlers, land clearing forced the remaining Wurundjeri people into neighbouring territories and away from the river. Originally called Birrarung by the Wurundjeri, the current name was mistranslated from another Wurundjeri term in the Boonwurrung language, Yarro-yarro, meaning "ever-flowing."

The river was utilised primarily for agriculture by early European settlers. The landscape of the river has changed dramatically since 1835. The course has been progressively disrupted and the river widened in places. The first of many crossings of the Yarra River to facilitate transport was built in Princes Bridge. Beginning with the Victorian gold rush it was extensively mined, creating the Pound Bend Tunnel in Warrandyte, and the Big and Little Peninsula Tunnels above Warburton. Widening and dams, like the Upper Yarra Reservoir, have helped protect Melbourne from major flooding. The catchment's upper reaches are also affected by logging. Industrialisation ultimately led to the destruction of the marshlands at the confluence of the Yarra and Maribyrnong Rivers in the area around Coode Island in West Melbourne.

Today, the Yarra mouth including Swanson and Appleton docks are used for container shipping by the Port of Melbourne, which is the busiest on the continent. The city reach, which is inaccessible to larger watercraft, has seen increased use for both transport and recreational boating (including kayaking, canoeing, rowing and swimming). In March 2019, it was reported that the river's environmental health is at risk due to litter, pollution, pets, and urban development.

Melbourne Water is the lead agency for implementing the Yarra Strategic Plan (Burndap Birrarung Burndap Unmarkoo) 2022–32. The plan gives effect to the community's long-term vision for the Yarra and supports collaborative management of the river and its lands. The annual Moomba Festival celebrates the Yarra River's cultural significance to Melbourne.

== Etymology ==
The river was called Birrarung by the Kulin people who occupied the Yarra Valley and much of Central Victoria prior to European colonisation. The name Birrarung is derived from a Wurundjeri word meaning "river of mists," as the area around the waterfall tended to get misty before nightfall.

At European arrival in 1835, Surveyor John Helder Wedge of the Port Phillip Association visited the area with two Kulin people, who pointed at the flowing water and said yarra yarra, recorded in Wedge's notebook as the phrase yarrow yarrow in the mistaken belief that this was the name for the river in the Boonwurrung language. Yarra yarra was instead what the Kulin people had referred to as the Yarra Yarra falls, which was later dynamited in 1883 as part of a series of extensive harbour improvements of the river, engineered by Sir John Coode. Wedge later learned of this and admitted he had mistaken the Kulin name for the falls for the river itself, but by then the name had stuck.

On his first contact with local Wurunderi people in 1835, John Wedge wrote:

On arriving in sight of the river, the two natives who were with me, pointing to the river, called out, Yarra Yarra, which at the time I imagined to be its name; but I afterwards learnt that the words were what they used to designate a waterfall, as they afterwards gave the same designation to a small fall in the river Werribee, as we crossed it on our way back to Indented Head.

— John Helder Wedge, published in Bonwick (1868).

== Geology and formation ==
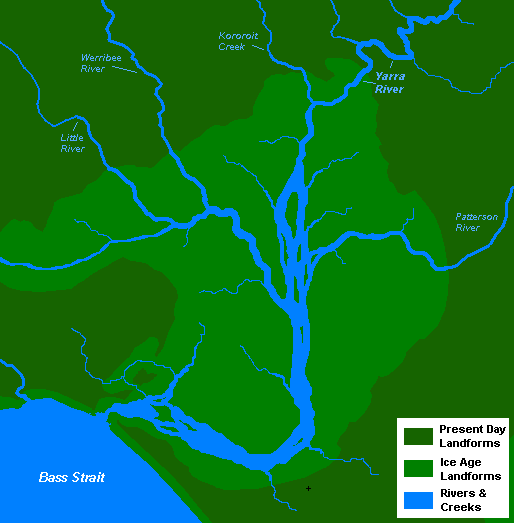
The course of the lower Yarra River around 10,000 years ago, after the end of the last ice age, prior to the creation of Port Phillip Bay

Before 8000 BC, the Yarra River probably joined course with other present-day Port Phillip Bay tributaries such as the Patterson/Dandenong, Kororoit, Werribee, Little River, Hovells, and Balcombe. It is believed it flowed directly south towards present-day McCrae, then bent west to drain through a narrow gap (what is now called the Rip) into a bay of the Great Australian Bight on the west side of a prehistoric land bridge called the Bassian Plain (which later became submerged into the Bass Strait). Between 8000 BC and 6000 BC, after the end of the most recent Ice Age, the rising sea level flooded the lower basin forming the shallow Port Phillip Bay, moving the Yarra river mouth over 50 km (31 mi) inland and separating various lower tributaries of the Yarra into their own river systems.

A dry period combined with sand bar formation may have dried out the Bay as recently as between 800 BC and 1000 AD, temporarily re-extending the Yarra south to Bass Strait during this period.

== History ==
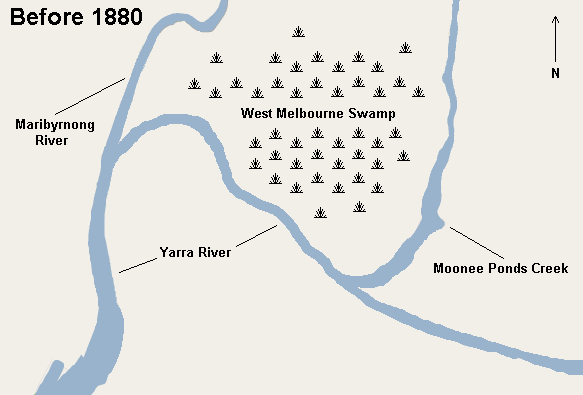
The confluence of the Yarra and Maribyrnong rivers before 1880

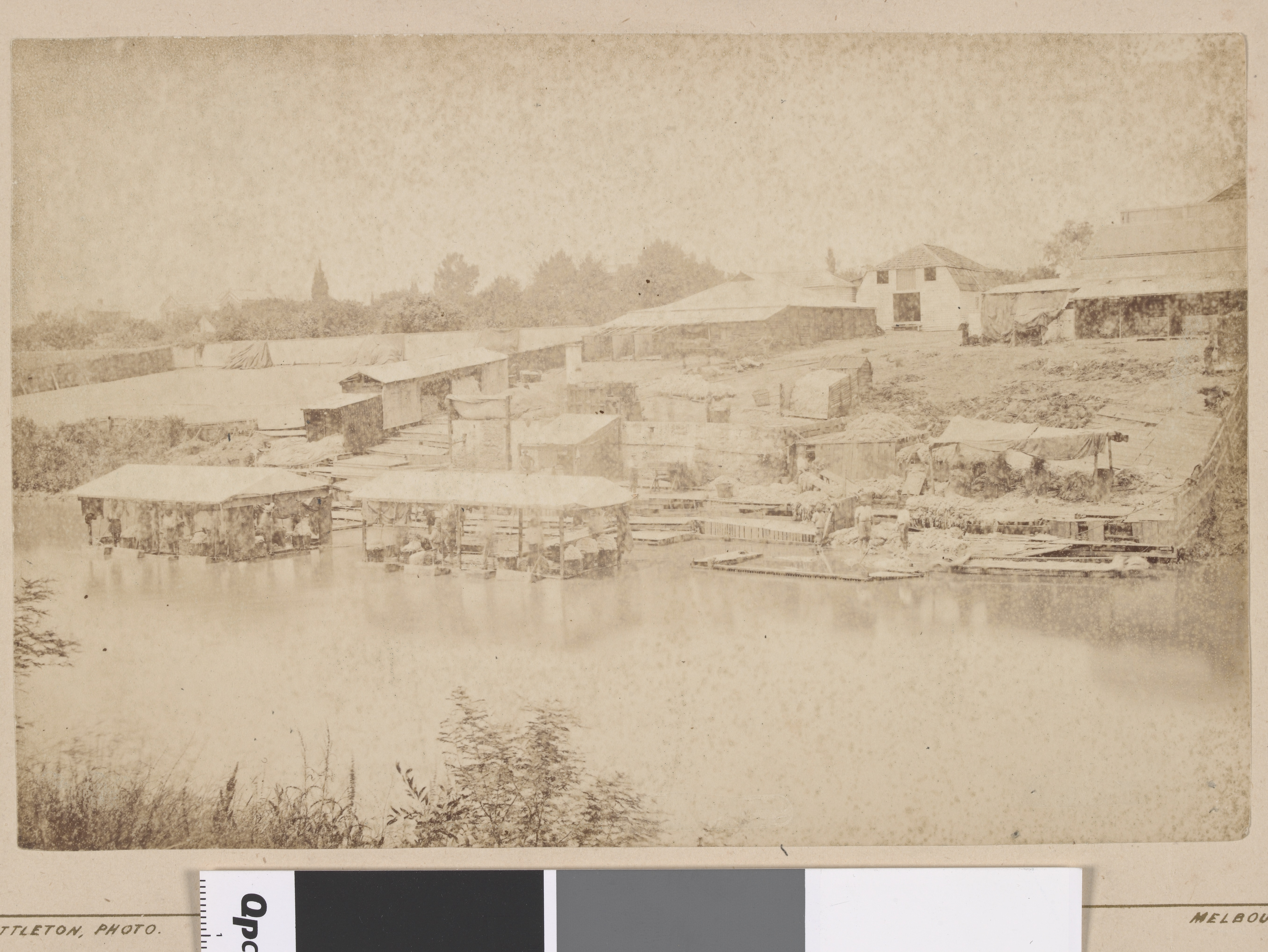
Photograph of wool washing sheds in and on banks of Yarra River in late 19th century

The area surrounding the Yarra River was first inhabited by the Boonwurrung and Wurundjeri peoples of the Kulin nation. The area has been occupied by various indigenous clans for at least 30,000 years. The river, known to the Wurundjeri people as Birrarung, was an important resource for the Wurundjeri people and several sites along the river and its tributaries were important meeting places where corroborees were held between Indigenous communities. The river's resources were utilised sustainably by the Wurundjeri until the arrival of European colonists in the early-mid-19th century.

=== European discovery and colonisation ===
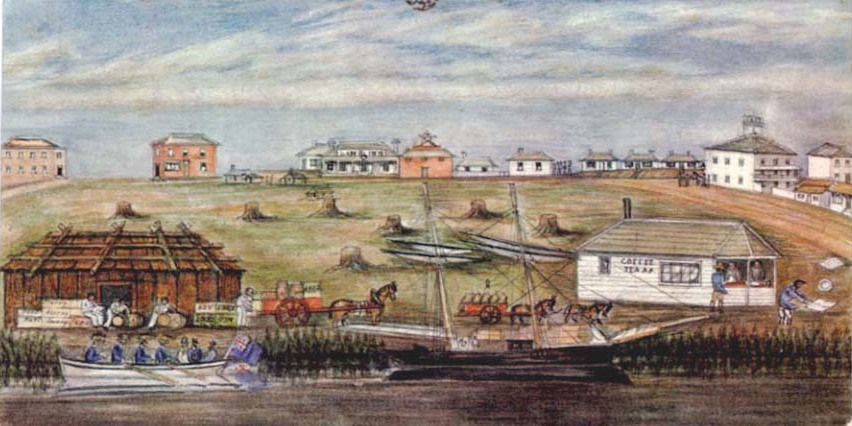
Melbourne Landing, 1840; watercolour by W. Liardet (1840)

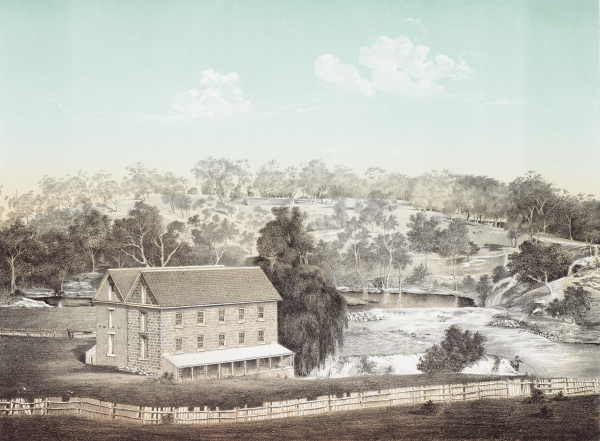
Dights Mill Abbotsford (built 1839) pictured in 1863

The first Europeans to sail up the river was a surveying party led by Charles Grimes, Acting Surveyor General of New South Wales, who in 1803 sailed upstream to Dights Falls, where they could no longer continue due to the nature of the terrain. European explorers would not enter the river for another 30 years until, in 1835, the area that is now central and northern Melbourne was explored by John Batman, a leading member of the Port Phillip Association, who negotiated a transaction for 600,000 acres (2,400 km^{2}) of land from eight Wurundjeri elders. He selected a site on the northern bank of the Yarra River, declaring that "this will be the place for a village." The document, commonly called Batman's Treaty, was declared void by the Governor of New South Wales, Richard Bourke.

The Port Phillip settlement, which would become Melbourne, was established along the lower banks of the Yarra in 1835. The new settlement's main port was situated just downstream of Yarra Falls, west of modern-day Queen's Bridge, the place where saltwater met freshwater. Ships would use one side of the falls while the other side provided fresh drinking water for the town and a convenient sewer. In the city's early days, the Yarra was one of two major ports, the other being Sandridge (now Port Melbourne), but the Yarra was preferred due to the direct access to the town's main streets and was the location of Customs House (now the Immigration Museum). Early industries grew along the riverbanks, rapidly degrading water quality. Industries then began using the river and tributaries such as Merri Creek as landfill and for harmful chemical dumps for substances like grease and oils.

The disposal of sewerage in Melbourne was very basic in the early days. The majority of waste from homes and industries flowed into street channels and on to local rivers and creeks, which became open sewers. The first City Baths were opened in 1860. The objective was to stop people bathing in the Yarra River, which by the 1850s had become quite polluted and caused an epidemic of typhoid fever, which resulted in many deaths. However, people continued to swim and drink the water until Melbourne's fresh water was sourced from elsewhere.

The first permanent crossing over the river was Princes Bridge, which first opened as a wooden trestle bridge in 1844. The current bridge was constructed in 1888. In the early days, the river would frequently flood. While this was not considered a problem in the floodplains near Yarra Glen and Coldstream, the floodings caused much trouble further downstream in settlements such as Warrandyte, Templestowe, Bulleen, Heidelberg and Ivanhoe. The Upper Yarra Dam was later constructed to alleviate the flooding, protecting settlements along the river, yet depriving the river banks of soil and silt deposits and causing other problems such as erosion and salinity.

=== Victorian gold rush ===
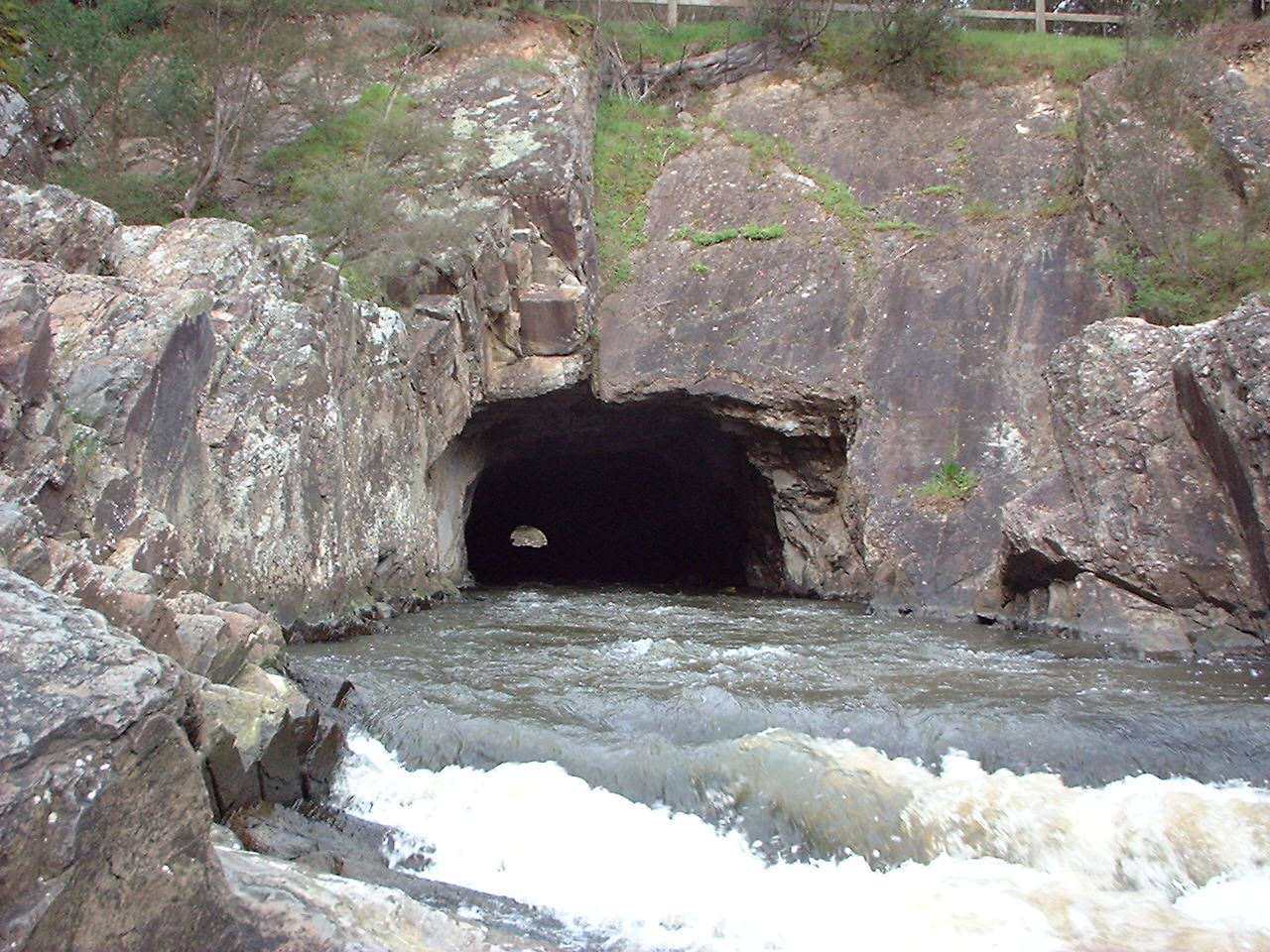
Pound Bend diversion tunnel

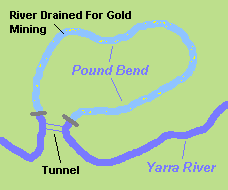
Map of the Pound Bend diversion tunnel in Warrandyte

Gold was first discovered in Victoria near the Yarra River in Warrandyte. The find was made by Louis Michel in 1851 at a tributary of the river, Andersons Creek, and marked the start of the Victorian gold rush. The approximate location of the site is marked by a cairn on Fourth Hill in Warrandyte State Park. The river was drained and diverted in various areas throughout the gold rush to aid gold miners. An example of this is the tunnel at Pound Bend in Warrandyte. The river was partially dammed at Pound Bend, near Normans Reserve at its eastern entrance and Bob's Wetlands at its western exit. Miners then blasted a 145m long tunnel through solid rock. The river was fully dammed at the entrance and exit to the tunnel and water was diverted through 145m and out the other side leaving 3.85 km of riverbed around Pound Bend exposed to the sun and miners' picks. Other diversions include The Island cutting in Warrandyte and the Little Peninsula Tunnel and Big Peninsula Tunnel near McMahons Creek.

The Gold Rush saw increased development in Melbourne and "tent cities" of new migrants lined the Yarra during the early years of the gold rush. In the 1840s, a weir was built at Dights Falls to power a flour mill and to give some control over the river downstream from there. From the earliest years of settlement, the mid and upper reaches of the Yarra began to be used for recreation. The river was selected as the site for the Royal Botanic Gardens in 1846 and the course of the river was modified slightly for the creation of a feature lake. Further upstream, the Cremorne Gardens were established in 1853.

=== Industrialisation ===
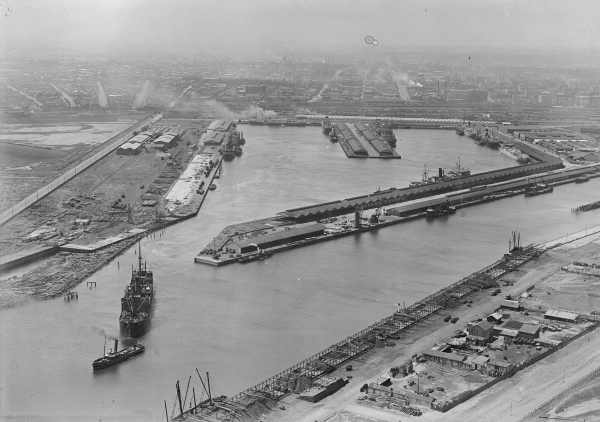
The Yarra and Victoria Docks in 1928

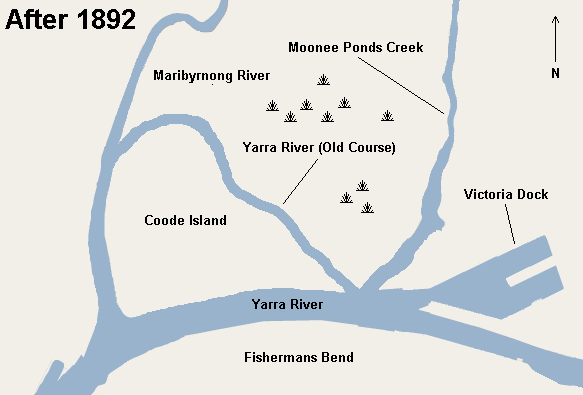
The creation of Coode Island after the 1880–1892 construction works

Sections of the river mouth and the area around the former West Melbourne Swamp were widened in the late 19th century, to make way for docks, harbours, bridges and other infrastructure. The increasing industrialisation of the river and the growth of the shipping industry saw the need for major infrastructure works which dramatically changed the course of the river in its lower reaches. The creation of new shipping channels to cope with the growing use of the Yarra by cargo ships was first tabled in the 1870s.

The first major change came with the cutting of the Coode Canal between 1880 and 1886. This major infrastructure project created an island which was known as Coode Island, named after the British consultant engineer engaged to design the works, Sir John Coode. This also included widening and deepening, and in some cases, vast areas of land were excavated, such as Victoria Dock, in order to give ease of access for cargo and later container ships. Abattoirs, smelters and even mortuaries used the river as a means of waste disposal in its lower reaches. This industrialisation led to a steady deterioration in water quality during the 19th century and into the 20th. In 1891, the Great Flood caused the Yarra to swell to 305 metres (1,001 ft) in width.

Initially known as "West Melbourne Dock", over 3 million cubic yards (2.3×10^{6} m^{3}) of material was excavated and a new dock was eventually opened in 1892. The material that was removed was subsequently used to fill in part of the West Melbourne Swamp. It took 6 days for water from the Yarra River to fill the dock, which was later renamed Victoria Dock. In 1910, the main channel was widened and deepened (81 to 131 m or 266 to 430 ft). In 1916, the central pier at Victoria Dock was completed, which provided 6 additional shipping berths and cargo sheds and created a distinctive landmark for Melbourne ports. By 1942, 650m of the old course of the Yarra River at Coode Island had been filled in, and by the 1950s, it had been completely filled and land parcels were allocated, including a site for new fish markets.

In 1957, the Upper Yarra Reservoir was constructed, primarily to alleviate flooding downstream. This reduced the river's flow to around 50%, where it sits today. Swanson Dock was constructed between 1966 and 1972, and equipped for modern container shipping. Shipping activity at Victoria Dock during this time had gone into steep decline and it was almost disused by the mid-1970s. In February 1972, the CBD was flooded as the natural watercourse of Elizabeth Street became a raging torrent. This was mostly due to previous stormwater drainage works which utilised Elizabeth Street as a watercourse during periods in which intense rain created flash floods. Prior to settlement, the area now occupied by Elizabeth Street was a gully off the river.

=== Recent history ===
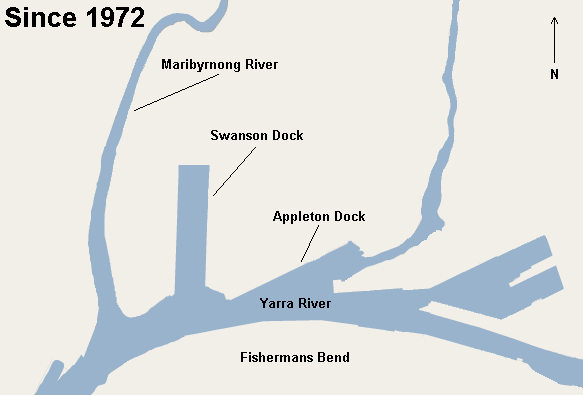
The area around Port Melbourne since the construction of Swanson Dock in 1972

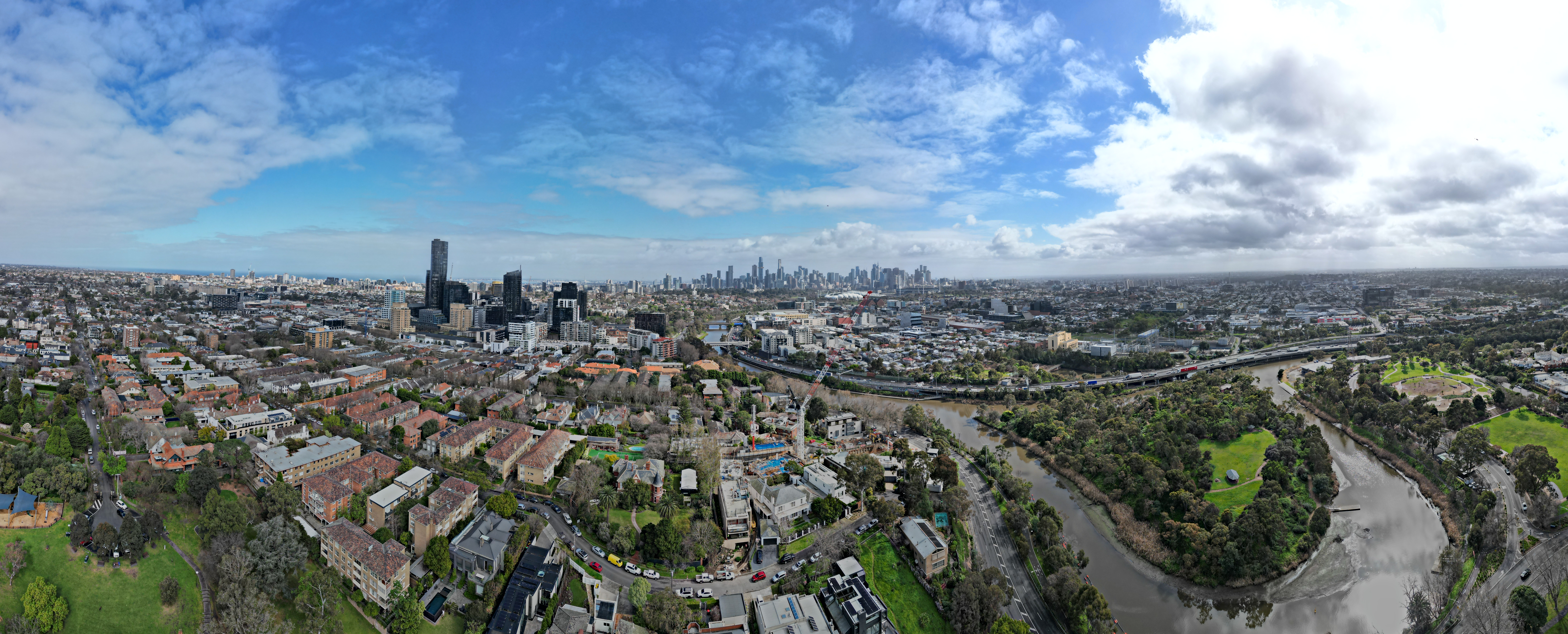
The Yarra River Birrarung meandering past South Yarra. September 2023.

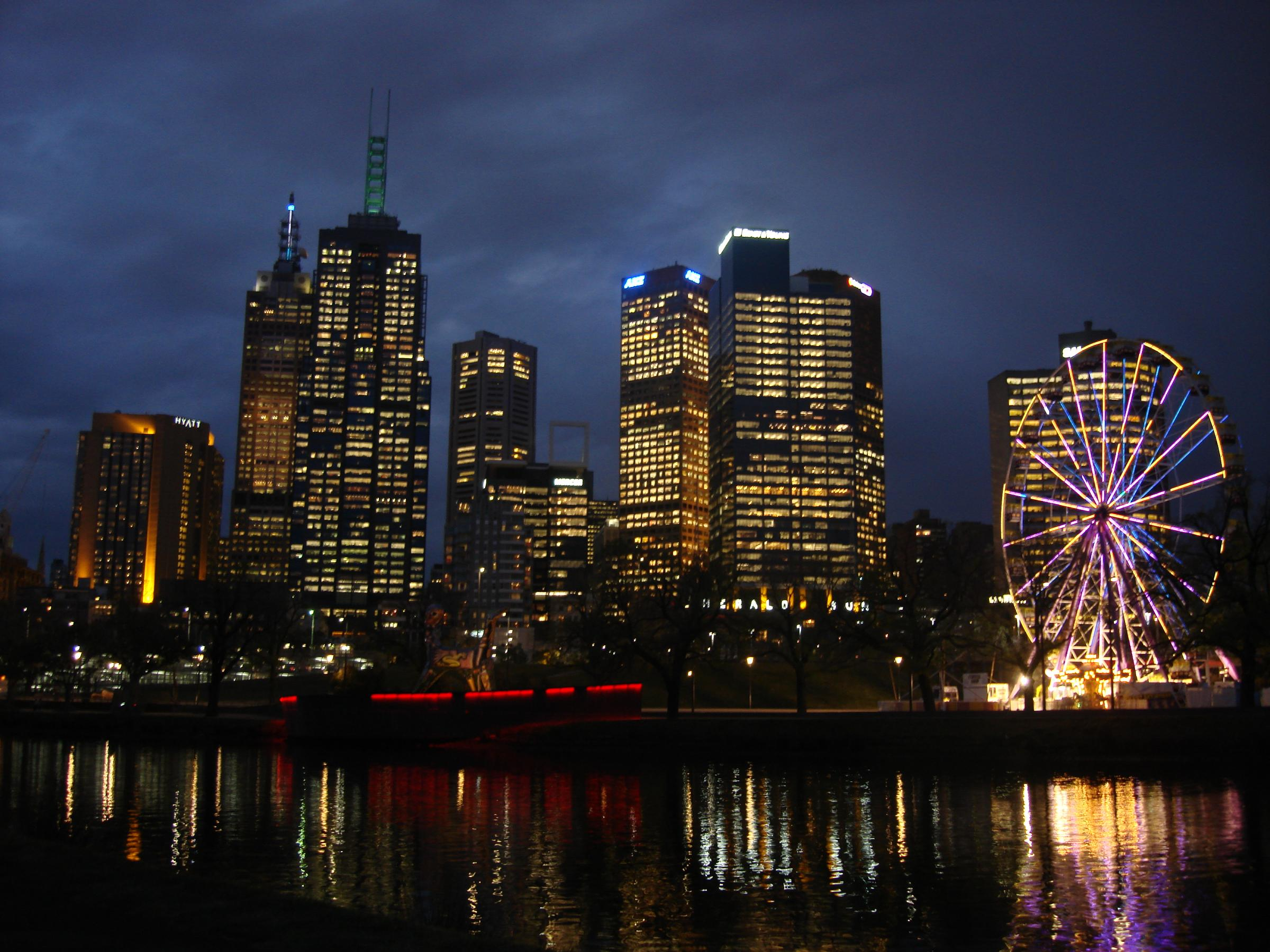
Inner-city projects, including Federation Square and Crown Casino, have focused on the advantage of the location of the Yarra River as a tourist attraction.

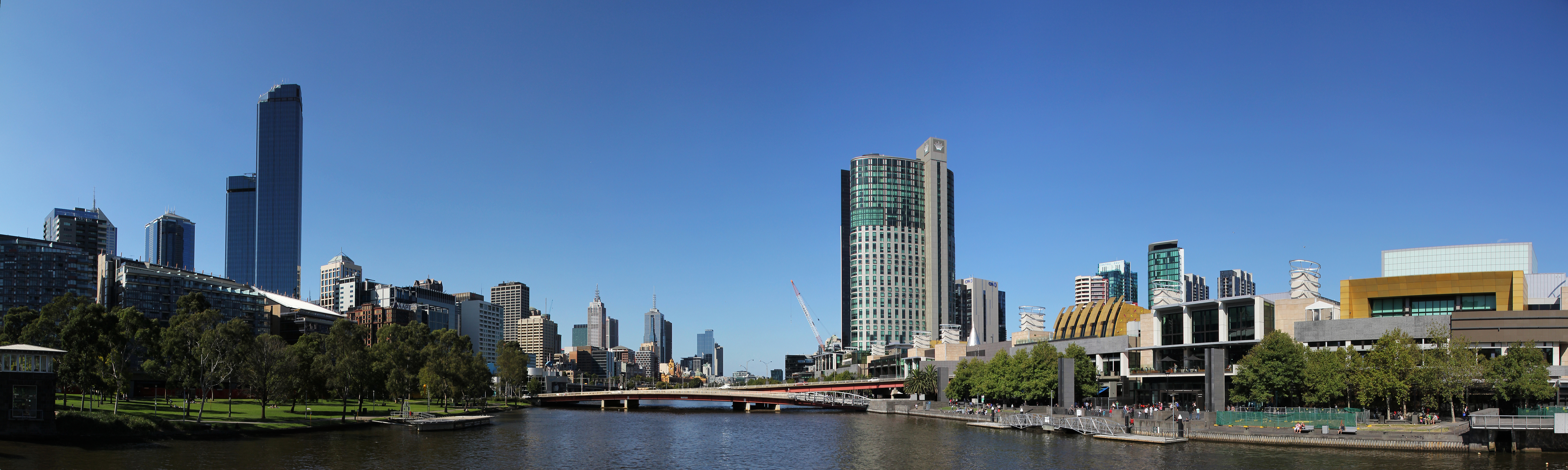
The development of Southbank's Promenade epitomises the recent revival of the Yarra as the capital's new Central Activities District.

By the 1960s there was a growing awareness of the neglect of the Yarra amongst some residents of Melbourne, spawning various community groups and Friends of organisations to protect the remnants of the river's ecology. Through the 1970s and 1980s, the river's lower courses progressively became gentrified and many desirable developments, such as the Victorian Arts Centre, sprung up around it. Growing high density residential development in the lower reaches in the early 1990s coincided with minor government programs such as the installation of litter traps. The riverside apartment complex Como Centre at South Yarra and the larger urban renewal of the formerly industrial Southbank precinct were both completed during the late 1990s. During this era it was also commonplace for the winner of the Australian Open to bathe in the Yarra River as a post victory celebration. On the southern side of the river, a number of university and private school rowing clubs use the river for recreational sports.

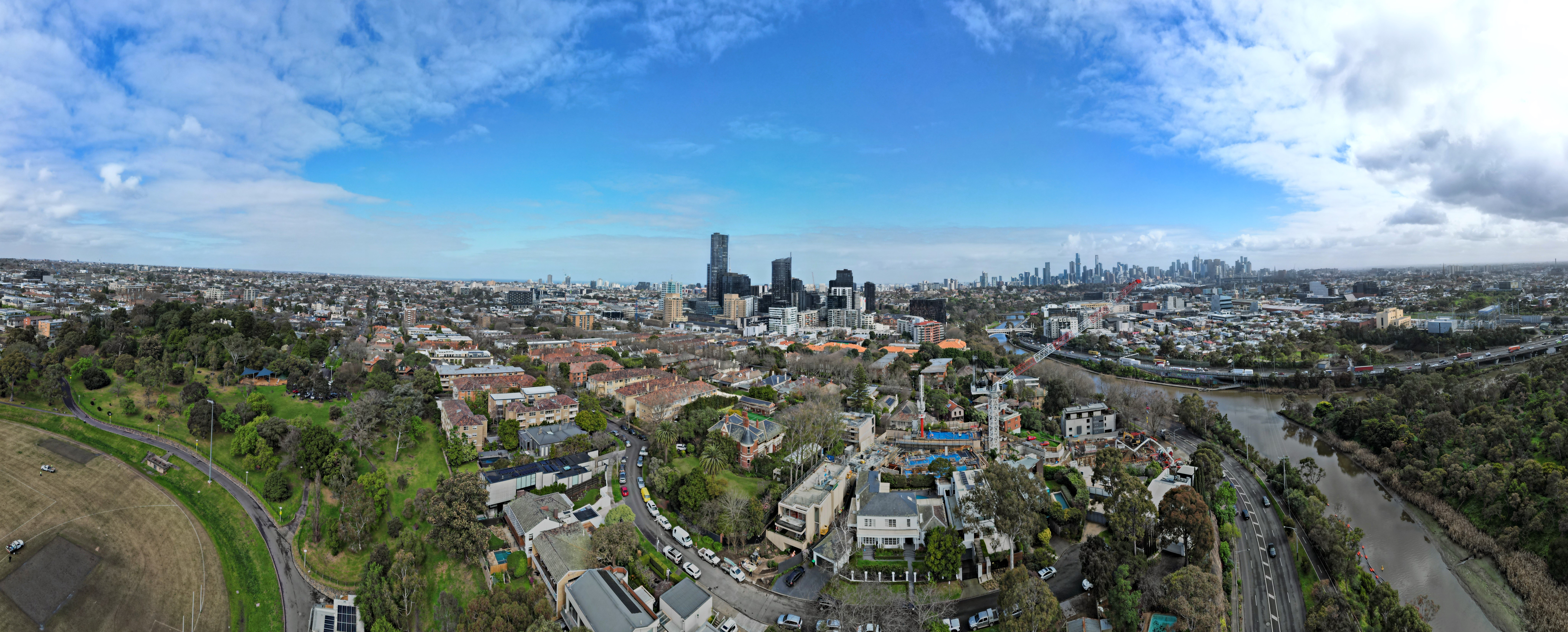
Aerial panorama of South Yarra facing the Melbourne skyline. September 2023.

Around 2000, the river became a focus of major government projects. Projects were proposed to connect Flinders Street station with the river and early plans suggested that the Melbourne Museum be situated on the south bank of the river. Ultimately, the Crown Melbourne and Melbourne Convention & Exhibition Centre were built in its place. The Melbourne Docklands urban renewal project began in 2000, comprising mixed use residential and commercial land and recreational boating moors along the river at the disused Victoria Dock and on the south bank of the Yarra. Federation Square was proposed to connect the spine of Melbourne to the Yarra at Federation Wharf and a neighbouring park, Birrarung Marr, was built along the north bank, creating renewed interest in connecting city workers to the river. New ferry services and water taxis sprang up along the city reach, servicing as far up river as South Yarra and out to Hobsons Bay.

In 2008, dredging began to deepen the mouth of the Yarra to enable large container ships to reach the Port of Melbourne. The project was controversial and strict regulations were enacted. It was feared that dredging would disturb heavy metals and other toxic sediments mostly deposited during Melbourne's industrial era. The project was completed in November 2009.

== Pollution and environmental issues ==
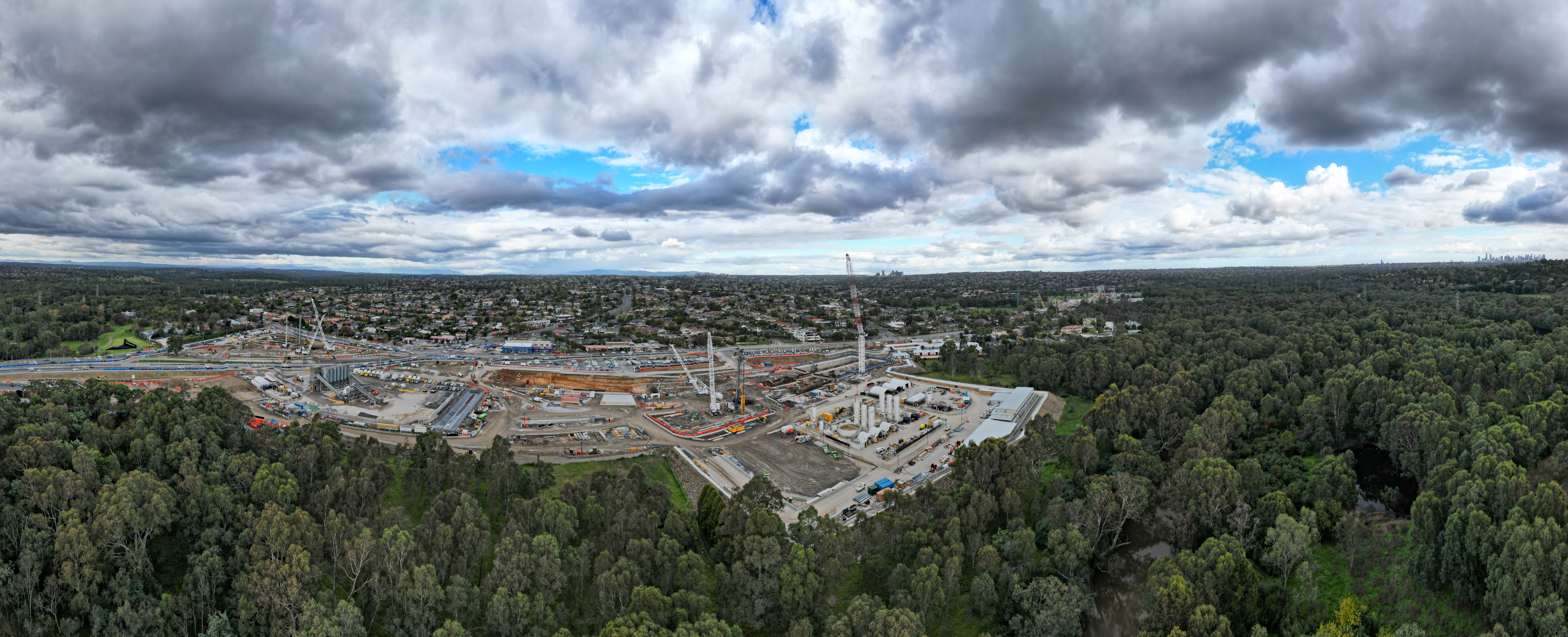
The Northeast Link works around Yarra Flats Park. April 2024.

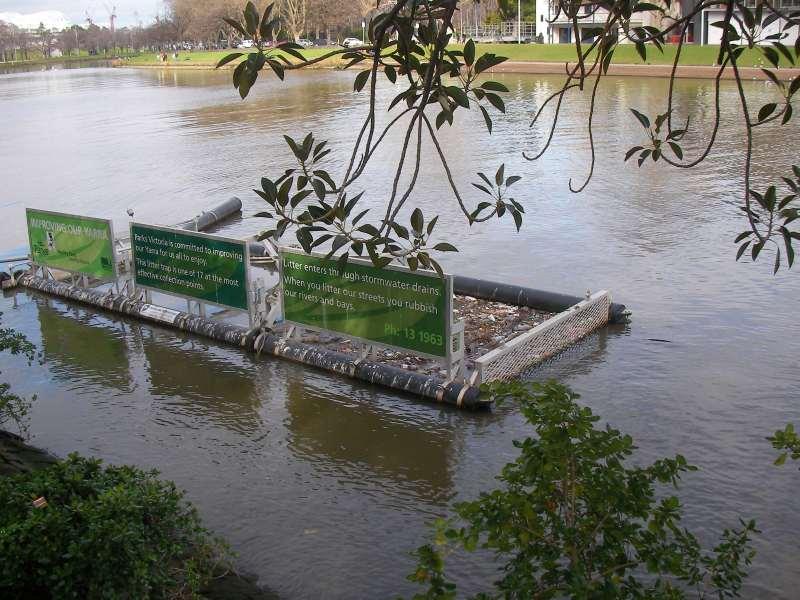
A Parks Victoria Litter trap on the river catches floating rubbish

The Yarra River was an important resource for the Wurundjeri people for around 40,000 years. The river's resources were utilised sustainably by the Wurundjeri until European settlement in the early to mid-19th century. Early industry located along the river contributed great amounts of pollution such as dangerous chemicals, grease, oil, and heavy metals. Through the mid-20th century, industry was slowly relocated away from the river and since then the primary pollutants have been stormwater runoff, sewage, and lasting effects of previous pollution. Gold mining cleared small areas of land of vegetation and for periods of time drained sections of the river. However, when compared to land clearing and industrial pollutants, the effects of gold mining on the river were quite minor.

Heavy metals deposited into the river throughout the late 19th and early 20th centuries settled to the bottom of the river bed, particularly in the lower reaches through the city and Port Melbourne. Due to the increased artificial depth of the river in this area, heavy metals have not been carried further, although some have been deposited out into Port Phillip. Oils and grease remain today in several tributaries in the lower reaches such as Merri Creek and Moonee Ponds Creek.

=== Pollution ===
Bacteria, particularly E. coli, and substances like grease, oils, and heavy metals are a major problem in the Yarra River and its tributaries.

High levels of E. coli, in some tributaries up to 200 times the safe limit, are caused primarily by poorly maintained septic systems.

Up to 350,000 cigarette butts enter the Yarra catchment stormwater runoff every day. Between 2014 and 2017, 1.3 million cigarette butts and 179 tonnes of litter were pulled from the river. These statistics represent the broader issue of rubbish and litter that is disposed of in stormwater runoff areas that eventually makes its way into the Yarra and, consequently, the sea.

Some industrial companies continue to use the Yarra as a dumping ground. For example, paper company Amcor has been fined several times by EPA Victoria for polluting the Yarra and its environs. In 2007, it was fined A$5,000 for discharging paper pulp into the Yarra from its Alphington plant, and in 2008 it was convicted for releasing oil into the Yarra from the same site and fined A$80,000.

Several programs are being implemented to minimise beach and river pollution, mostly organised by community groups, EPA Victoria, and local councils.

In 2015, a facility for washing down cars and chemical containers, located inside Warrandyte State Park, illegally leaked toxic chemicals and herbicides into Yarra River, killing trees and endangering public safety.

=== Lack of flooding ===
Due to damming and the lack of natural flooding, much of the surrounding vegetation is lacking in the silt and soil deposits that would otherwise be provided by the floods. The construction of the Upper Yarra Reservoir in 1957 reduced the river's flow by around 50%. This has ultimately led to a lack of healthy understory and saplings, or a lack of saplings completely, which contributes to problems such as reduced habitat, erosion and salinity. These issues ironically affect surrounding agriculture.

=== Water colour ===
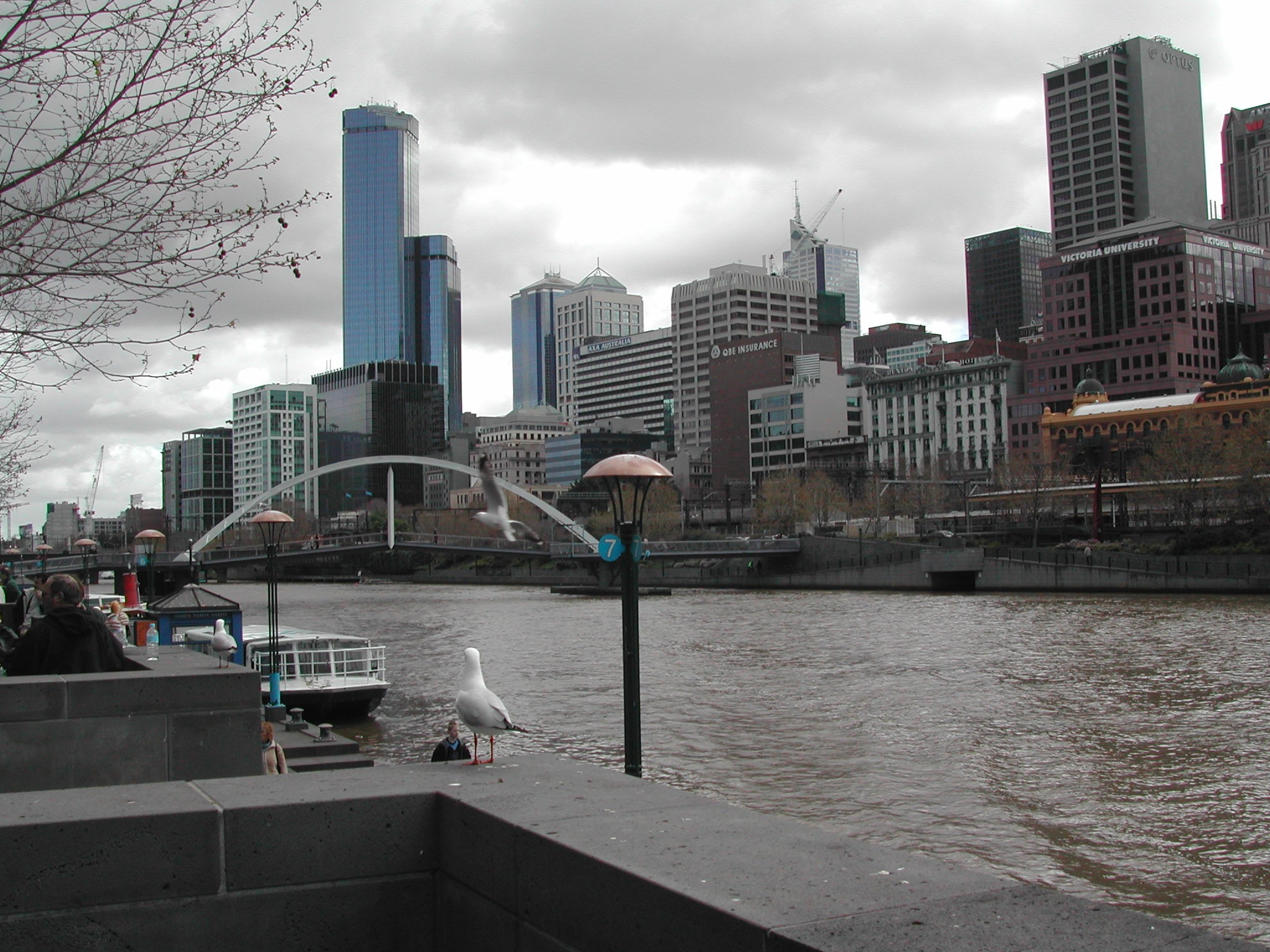
The distinctive colour of the river is easily recognisable.

The Yarra River is colloquially known as "the upside down river" for its golden hue. The muddy brown colour is caused by the easily eroded clay soils of its catchment area. The water was clear at the time of the first European settlements, but intensive land clearing and development since the mid-19th century has resulted in the presence of microscopic clay particles. The particles are kept suspended by turbulence in some parts of the middle and lower sections of the river. When the river water combines with marine salts as it enters Port Phillip, the suspended particles clump together and sink. The presence of clay particles is not a major factor in the pollution of the river.

=== Environmental advocacy ===
Many advocacy groups are dedicated to protecting the Yarra River and its environs for current and future generations. The largest of these is the Yarra Riverkeepers Association (YRKA). YRKA is part of the global Waterkeeper Alliance Movement and has been involved in forums and discussions pushing for policies to ensure that "the voice" of the river is heard. Together with the many other advocacy groups, YRKA views the Yarra River as Melbourne's greatest natural asset and posits that its preservation and restoration is vital in helping Melbourne become a sustainable city.

== Geography ==
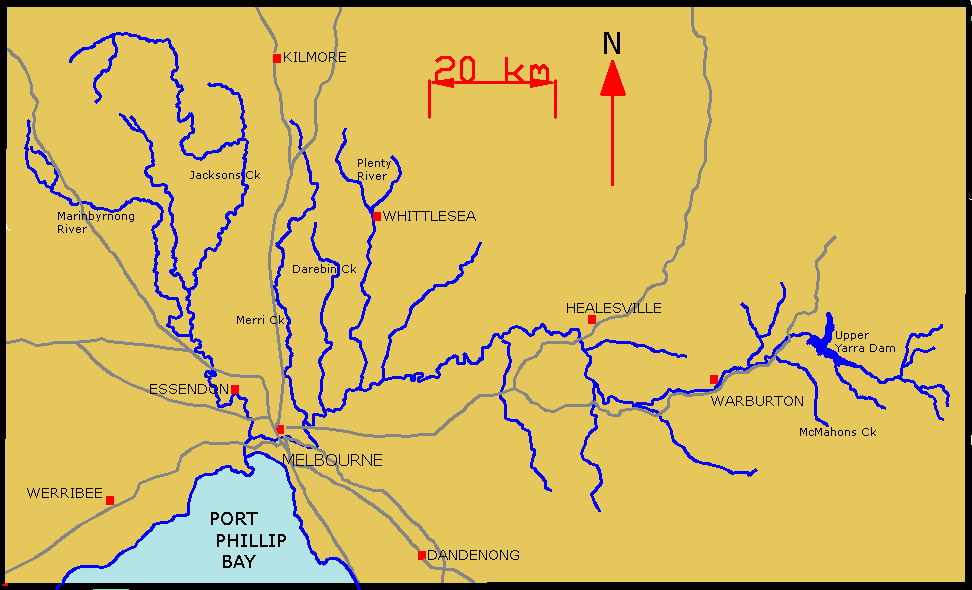
Map of Yarra River and its tributaries

The Yarra River has a detailed and complex geological history. It was managed sustainably by the Wurundjeri for around 40,000 years; however, since European settlement, its geography has changed substantially, reflecting the unsustainable use of the river and surrounding resources. The river is fed by a number of small unnamed creeks and streams in the Yarra Ranges as well as 49 named tributaries, most of which are creeks. The river's lower reaches travel through central Melbourne. It is approximately 242 kilometres (150 mi) in length, with a mean annual flow of 718 gigalitres (2.54×10^{10} cu ft). It is the most westerly snow-fed river in Australia. The total catchment area is approximately 4,000 square kilometres (1,500 sq mi).

=== Tributaries and geographic features ===
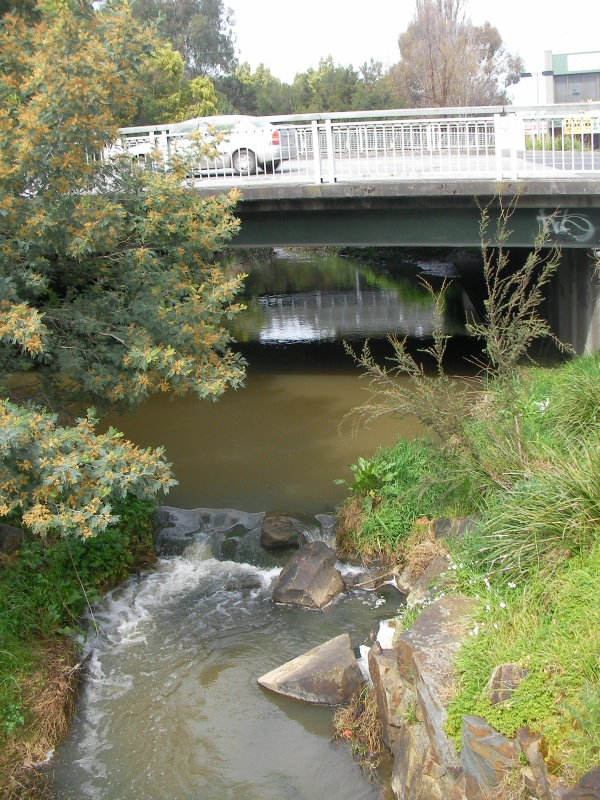
Olinda Creek at Lilydale, an upper tributary of the Yarra

The Yarra's major tributaries are the Maribyrnong River, Moonee Ponds Creek, Merri Creek, Darebin Creek, Plenty River, Mullum Mullum Creek, and Olinda Creek. The river hosts many geographical features such as bends, rapids, lakes, islands, floodplains, billabongs, and wetlands. Most features have been named after translated Wurundjeri phrases or have European, particularly British, origins. Some of the river's prominent features include: Coode Island and Fishermans Bend, Victoria Harbour, Herring Island, Yarra Bend, Dights Falls, Upper Yarra Dam and Reservoir, and many river flats and billabongs.

=== Settlements ===
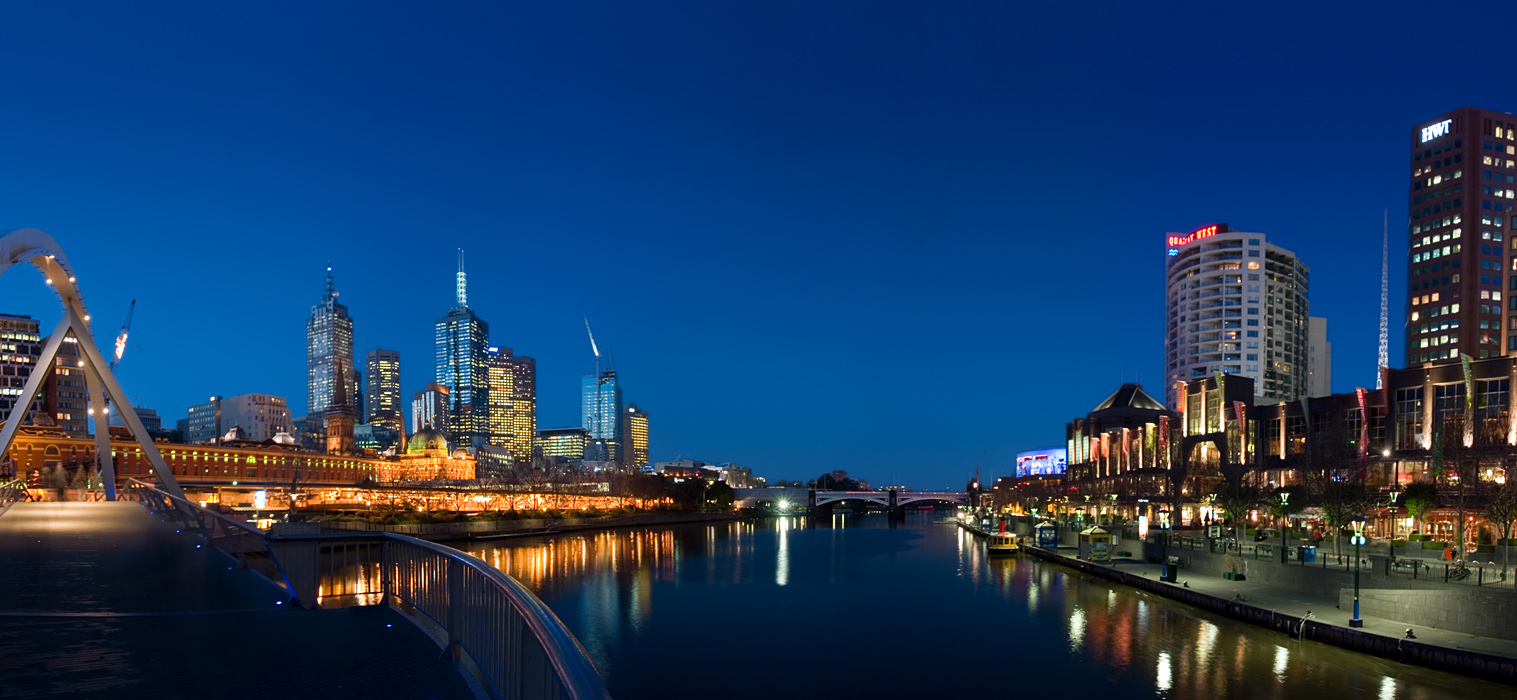
Melbourne is the largest settlement that the Yarra flows through. The Yarra at central Melbourne is shown here at night, with the central business district on the left and Southbank on the right

- Greater Melbourne – 4.64 million

Melbourne City Centre – 20,500
South Yarra – 18,000
Richmond – 22,500
Hawthorn – 20,000
Fairfield – 5,000
Heidelberg – 5,300
Bulleen – 10,500
Templestowe – 16,500
Eltham – 17,600
Warrandyte – 10,000

- Yarra Glen – 2,600
- Healesville – 6,500
- Woori Yallock – 2,800
- Launching Place – 2,600
- Yarra Junction – 1,700
- Warburton – 2,300
- McMahons Creek – 282

== Ecology ==
The river is home to several species of fish. In the lower reaches of the Yarra, there are mainly brackish species such as the southern black bream and jellyfish, and in the upper reaches, smaller quantities of freshwater fish such as European perch (redfin), Macquarie perch, brown trout, Murray cod, and freshwater catfish can be found. However, almost all fish that live in the Yarra are contaminated with heavy metals including arsenic and are not fit for human consumption.

Dolphins have been known to venture as far upstream as South Yarra, demonstrating the increased salinity of the river's lower reaches. Platypus are rarely seen as far downstream as Fairfield.

== Course ==
=== Upper reaches ===
The river's source is a series of swamps in the upper reaches of the Yarra Ranges National Park, directly to the west of the Mount Baw Baw plateau. Mount Baw Baw is a thickly forested subalpine park which is entirely closed-off to all except the employees of Melbourne Water. The park features extensive stands of mountain ash (a very tall eucalypt), tree ferns, and patches of remnant rainforest.

The Upper Yarra Dam, one of a number of dams in the Yarra Catchment that supply a large part of Melbourne's water, is the furthest upstream point on the river visible to the general public (though the dam itself is closed off). The first settlement the river passes through is the town of Reefton, but most of the river is surrounded by temperate forest-covered hills until the timber and resort town of Warburton. The Woods Point Road follows the river through this section.

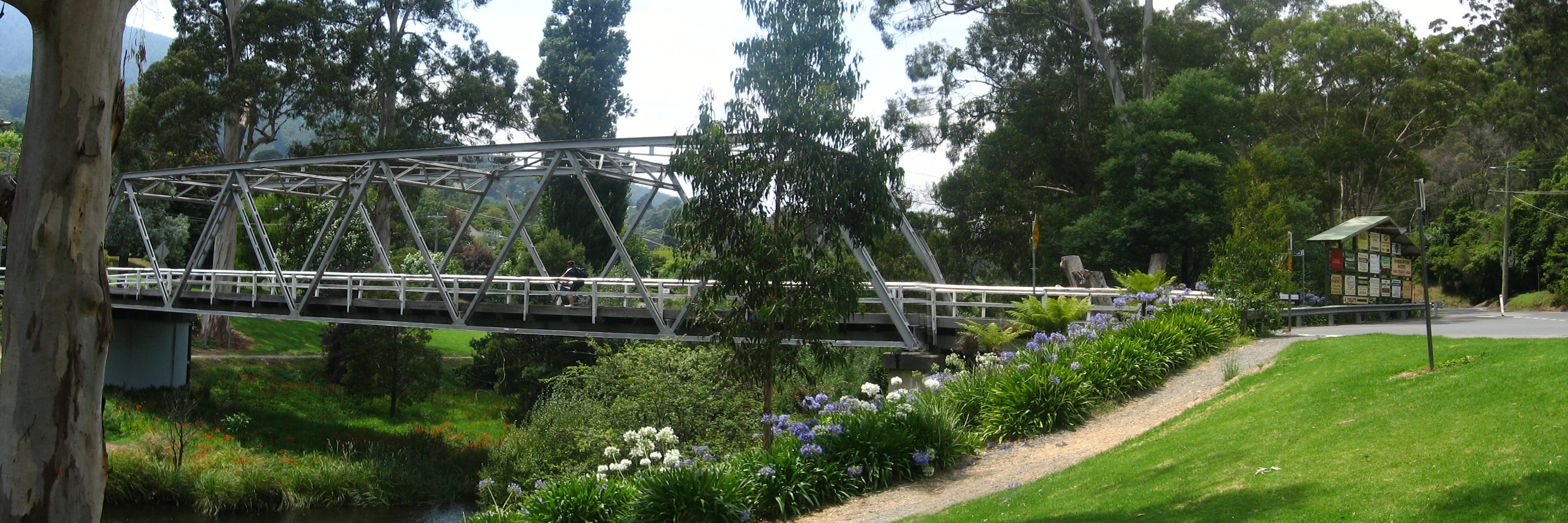
The Brisbane Bridge over the Yarra River, Warburton

Downstream of Warburton, the Yarra Valley gradually opens out and farms begin to appear, including beef and dairy farms, and by the town of Woori Yallock and the river's turn north, increasingly large areas are covered by vineyards, forming the Yarra Valley wine region. At Healesville, the river turns west again and the stream bed becomes increasingly silty, reducing the clarity of the water, and by the commuter town of Yarra Glen, it begins to take on the brownish colour that the lower reaches are known for.

=== Middle reaches ===
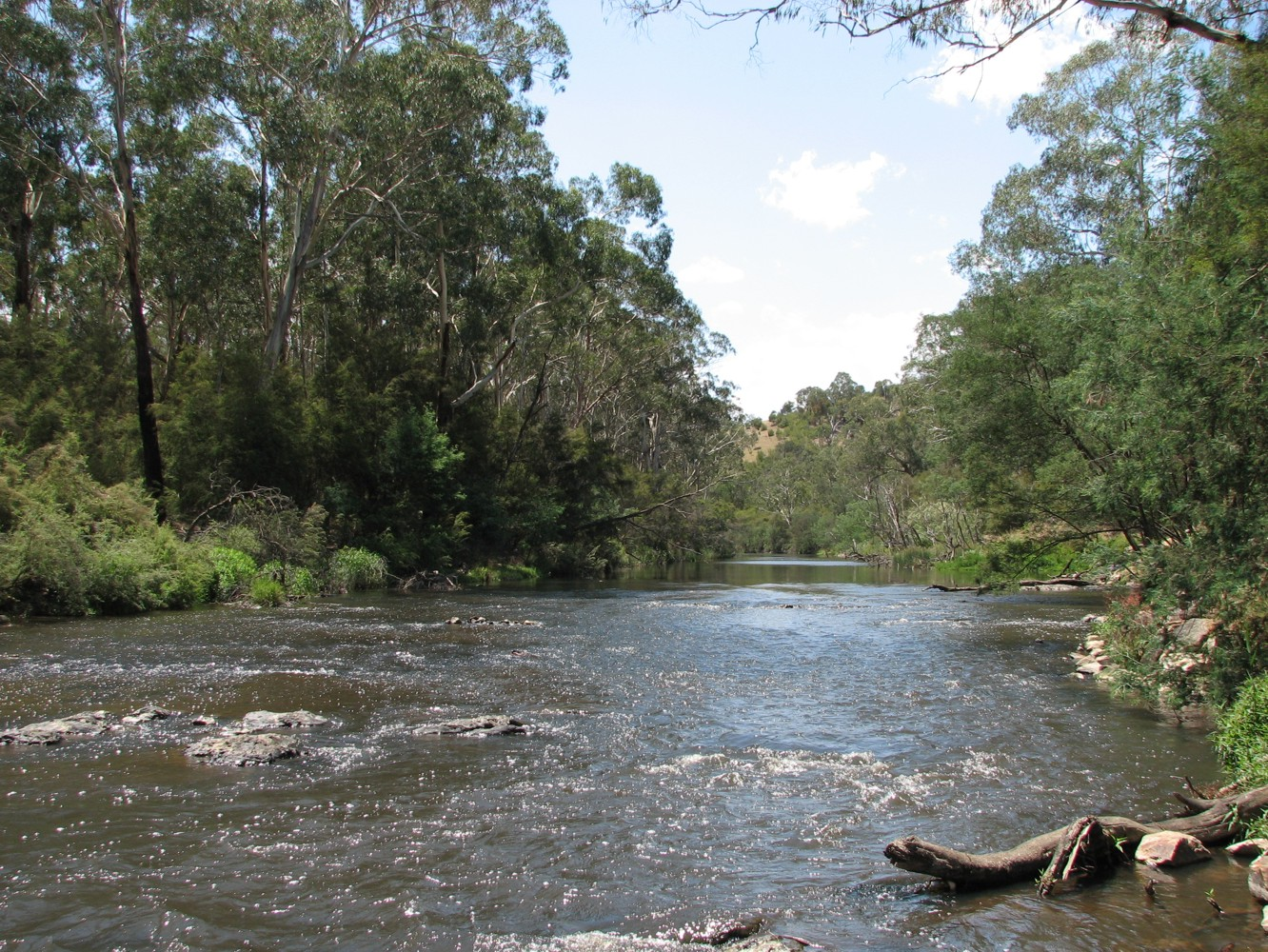
The river through Wonga Park

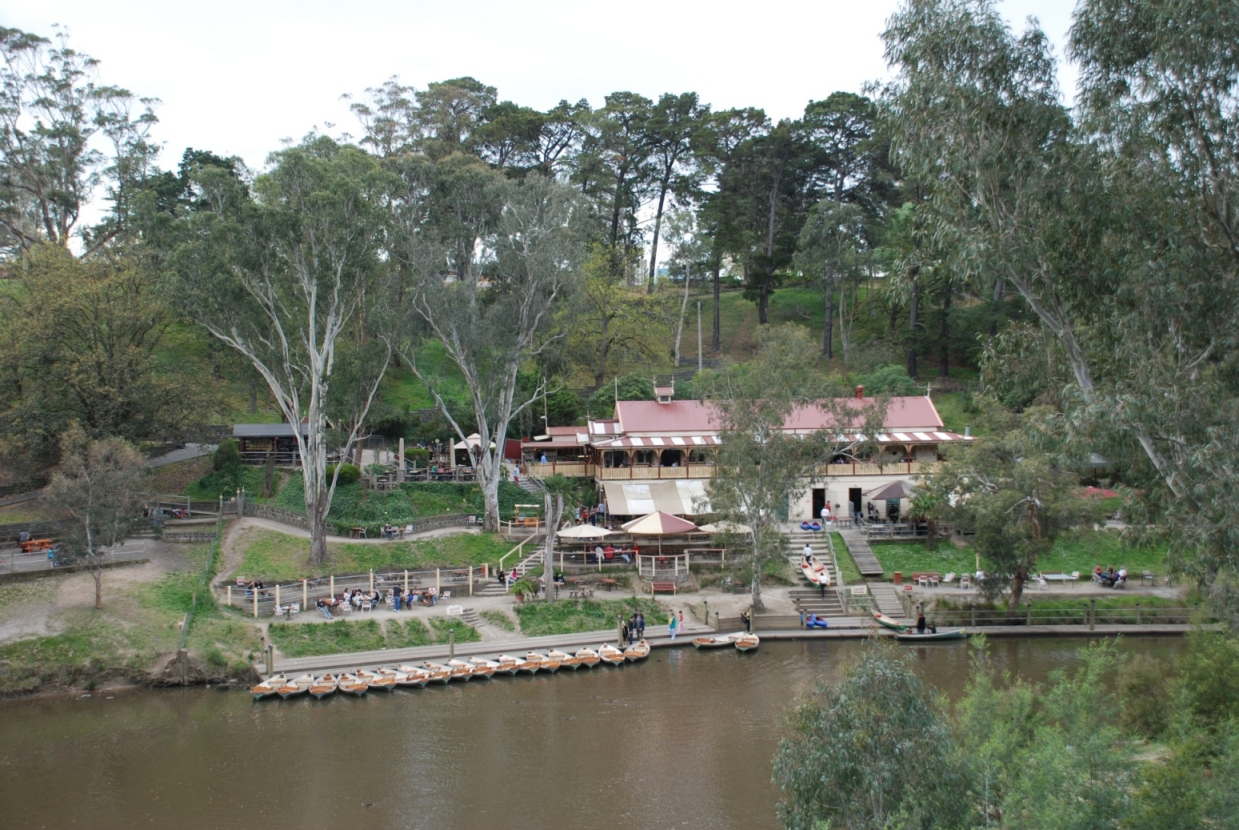
The river at Fairfield boathouse

The river enters Melbourne's suburbs proper at Chirnside Park, but virtually all the river's length is surrounded by parkland, much retaining (or having been replanted with) extensive native vegetation. A bicycle and walking trail known as the Main Yarra Trail begins at Warrandyte and becomes the Yarra River Trail–– in the lower reaches, the Capital City Trail. The river is used extensively for kayaking at Templestowe, and canoes can often be seen throughout the suburban section. Some small hobby farms are located in the floodplain area of the river, close to central Melbourne and almost completely surrounded by suburbs.

=== Lower reaches ===
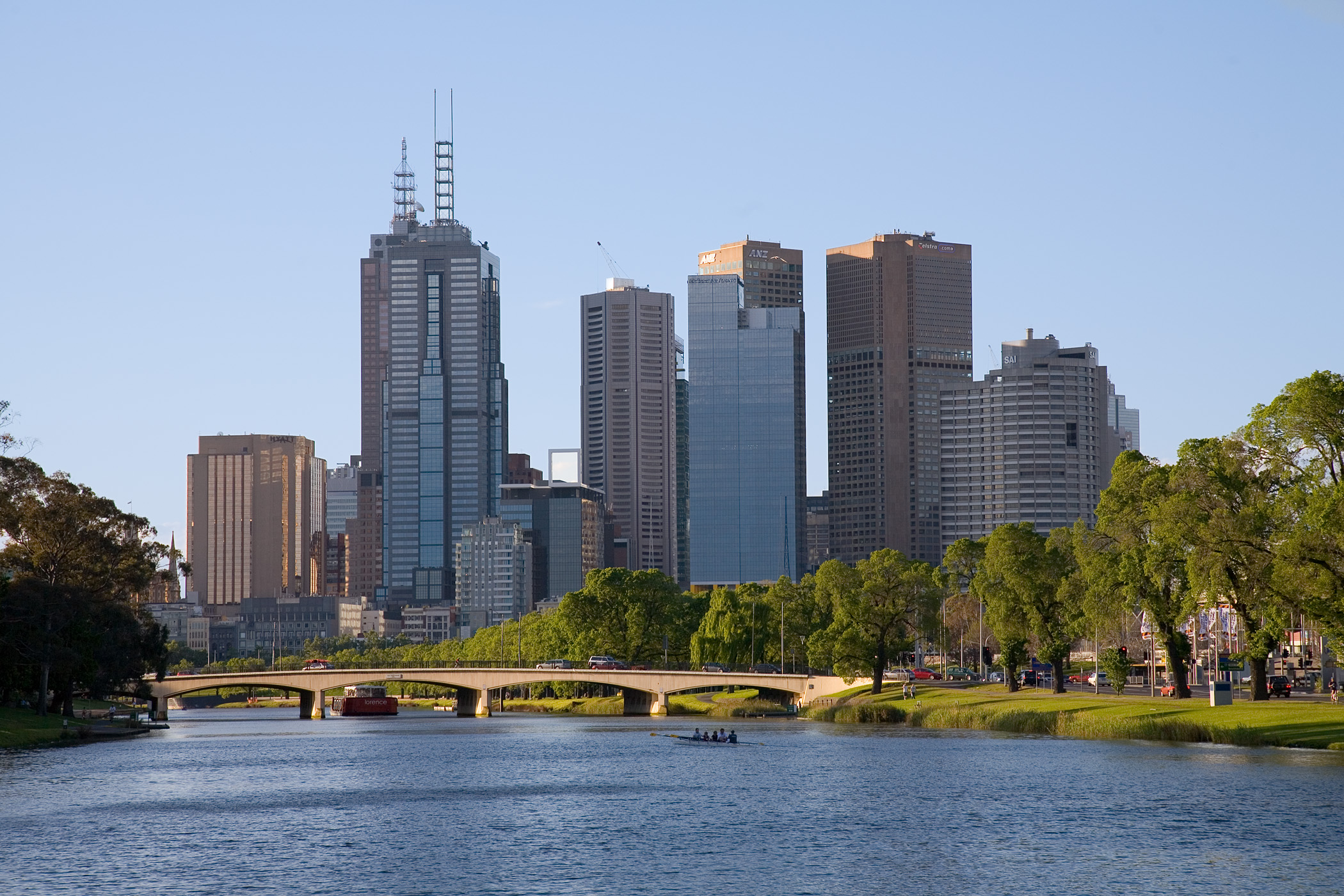
The Yarra River as it flows north-west towards central Melbourne, passing underneath the Swan Street Bridge

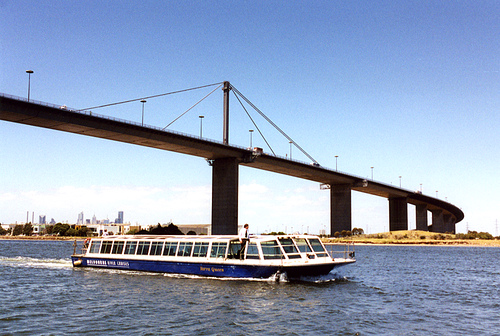
Yarra at the West Gate near the river mouth

Below Dights Falls at Yarra Bend Park in inner Melbourne, the river becomes increasingly estuarine as it passes along the southern side of the central business district. This area forms the venue for the annual "Moomba" festival, which notably features a water skiing competition that attracts a huge crowd. The lower stretch of the river from Docklands to the Melbourne Cricket Ground was part of the final path of the Queen's Baton Relay of the 2006 Commonwealth Games. Many of Melbourne's private schools, located close to the river, train their rowing crews on it.

The lower reaches feature a number of boat cruises, using especially low-roof boats that can pass under the many bridges along this section of the Yarra. Herring Island is a small island at South Yarra, which can be accessed via a punt. The area in front of old Customs House is a former turning basin for ships. This is the point which was once known as "Freshwater Place" due to a set of cascades that prevented both saltwater and larger ships from going further upstream. This natural blockage was removed using explosives and divers in 1883.

The final section of the Yarra passes through the Port of Melbourne and under the Bolte Bridge and the West Gate Bridge. The current course dates back to 1886 when a canal devised by British engineer Sir John Coode was cut from west of Flinders Street to below its junction with the Maribyrnong. The resulting island between the new and old courses of the river was named Coode Island and is now part of the mainland with the former course to the north filled in. The river flows into Port Phillip, the site being extensively altered as part of the Port of Melbourne, Australia's busiest seaport.

== Crossings ==
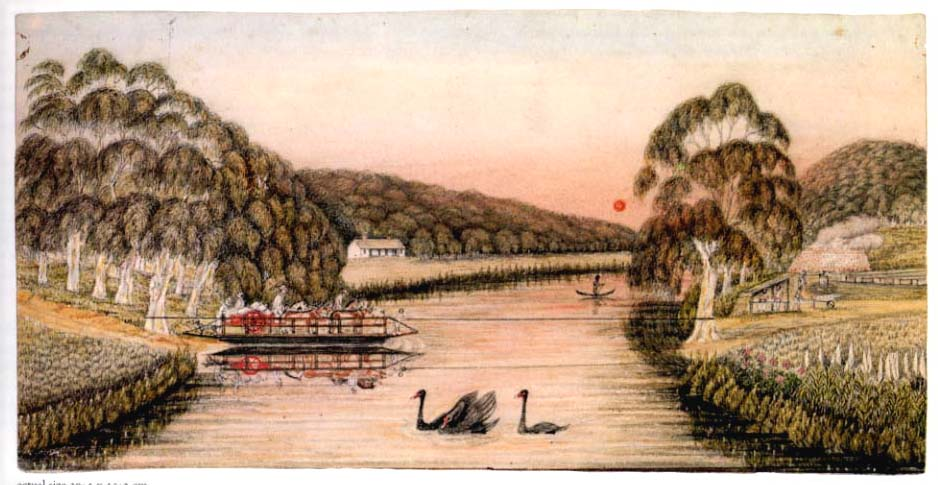
Yarra crossing punt road, Melbourne, 1838. by W. Liardet

Since the first permanent crossing was built over the river in 1844, there are now over 60 places where pedestrians, cars, and other vehicles can cross the river. As the river is never wider than around 350m and is on average only around 50m wide, most of the crossings are located in the suburbs of Greater Melbourne. There are fewer crossings towards the mouth of the river, most notably the West Gate, Bolte, and Princes Bridges, as well as the Burnley and Domain Tunnels. Small historical bridges can be found further downstream including at Banksia Street, Fitzsimons Lane, and Warrandyte. Beyond Warburton there are very few crossings available. Some of the more prominent and historical crossings include:

- West Gate Bridge, 1978
- Bolte Bridge, 1999
- Sandridge Bridge, 1888
- Princes Bridge, 1844/1850/1888
- CityLink Tunnels, 1997
- Morell Bridge, 1899
- Johnston Street Bridge, 1858
- Warrandyte Bridge, 1861/1952

== Parklands ==
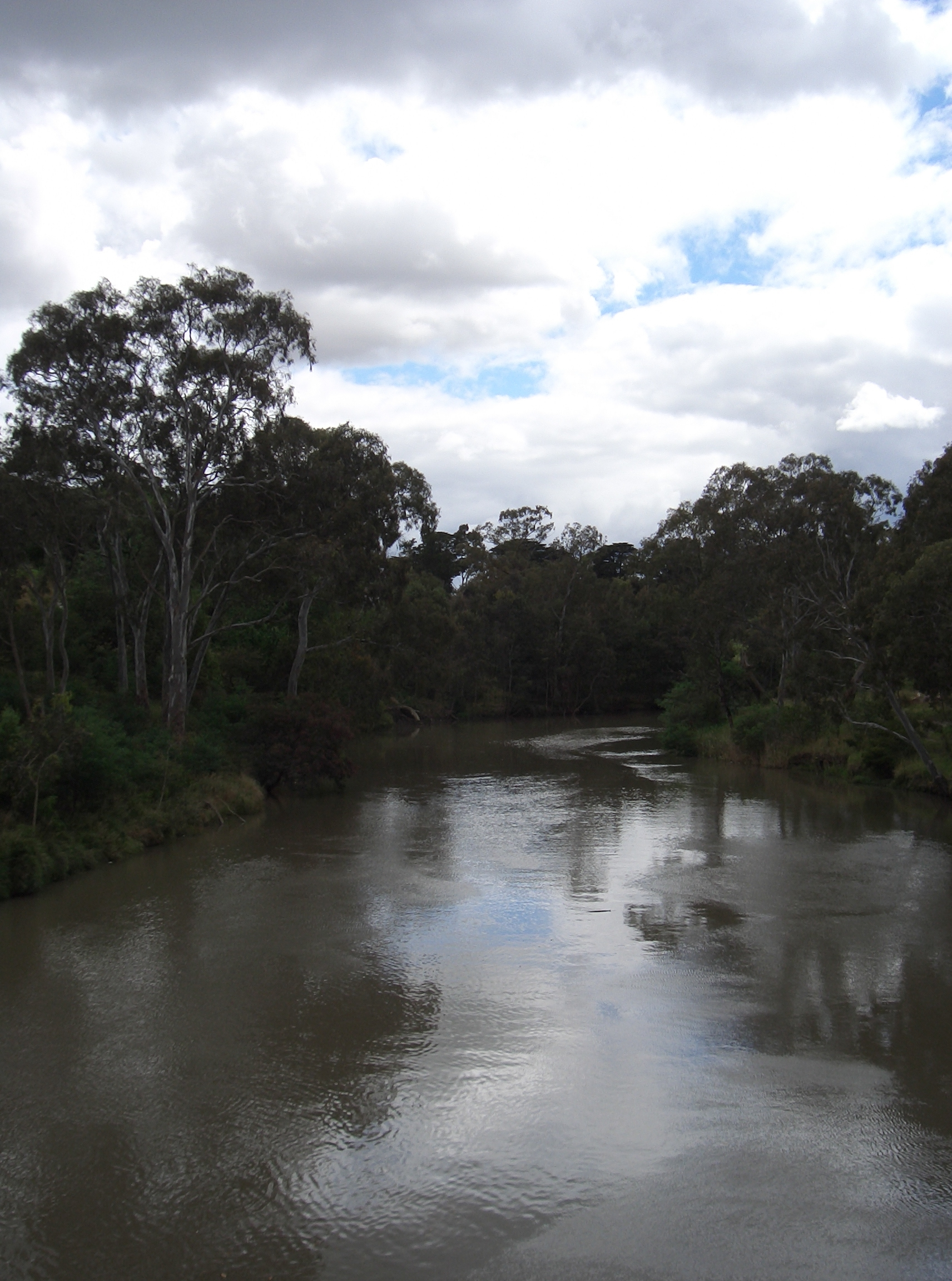
The Yarra River, as seen from Kanes Bridge near the Studley Park boathouse

Several reserves have been set aside adjoining the Yarra, mostly to preserve the natural environment or to support recreation. Many of these are managed and operated by Parks Victoria, the state government agency responsible for the management of Victoria's national parks and other reserves. The largest and most notable of these parklands include the Royal Botanic Gardens, Birrarung Marr, Yarra Bend Park, Westerfolds Park, Warrandyte State Park, and the Yarra Ranges National Park.

=== Major parks ===
Some of the larger parklands adjoining the river include, from downstream to upstream:

- Birrarung Marr
- Royal Botanic Gardens
- Yarra Bend Park
- Westerfolds Park
- Warrandyte State Park
- Yarra Ranges National Park

=== Golf courses ===
There are 14 golf courses along the river. These include, from downstream to upstream:

- Burnley Golf Course (9)
- Studley Park Golf Course (9)
- Yarra Bend Public Golf Course (18)
- Latrobe Golf Course (18)
- Green Acres Golf Club (18)
- Kew Golf Club (18)
- Ivanhoe Public Golf Course (18)
- Freeway Public Golf Course (18)
- Yarra Valley Country Club (9)
- Bulleen Driving Range
- Rosanna Golf Club (18)
- The Heritage Golf and Country Club

- Henly Course (18)
- St. John Course (18)

- Warburton Golf Club (18)

== Popular culture ==
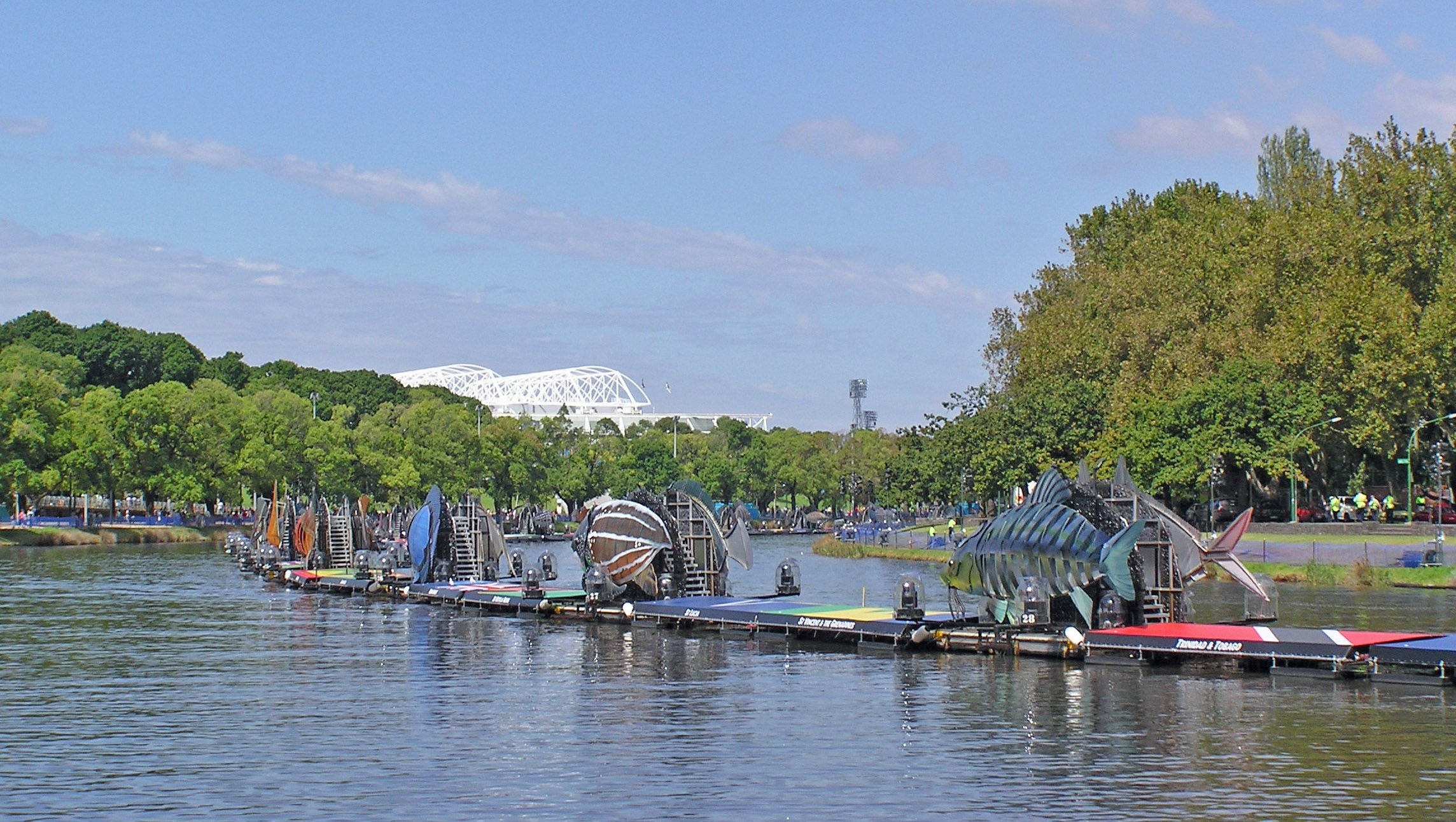
Artificial fish on the Yarra during 2006 Commonwealth Games

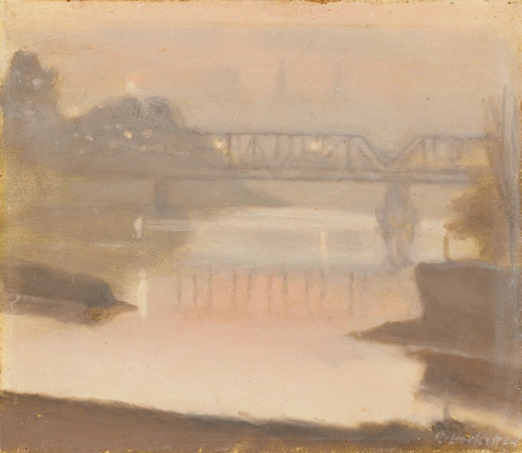
Clarice Beckett, The Yarra, Sunset (1930)

The Yarra is considered an important part of Melbourne's culture and a symbol of the city, and as a result, it has been the source of artistic and cultural expression.

- The Yarra has been captured in many famous paintings including some by the Heidelberg School.
- The annual Moomba festival celebrates the Yarra River's increasing cultural significance to Melbourne.
- The river has featured in songs by the Whirling Furphies ("My Brown Yarra,") and the Coodabeen Champions ("By the Banks of the Yarra").
- A poem entitled "Yara Yara" was written by Greek poet Nikos Kavvadias in 1951.
- The Yarra Song was written by Billy Bragg and included on the Australian edition of his 2002 album England, Half English.

== Recreational use ==
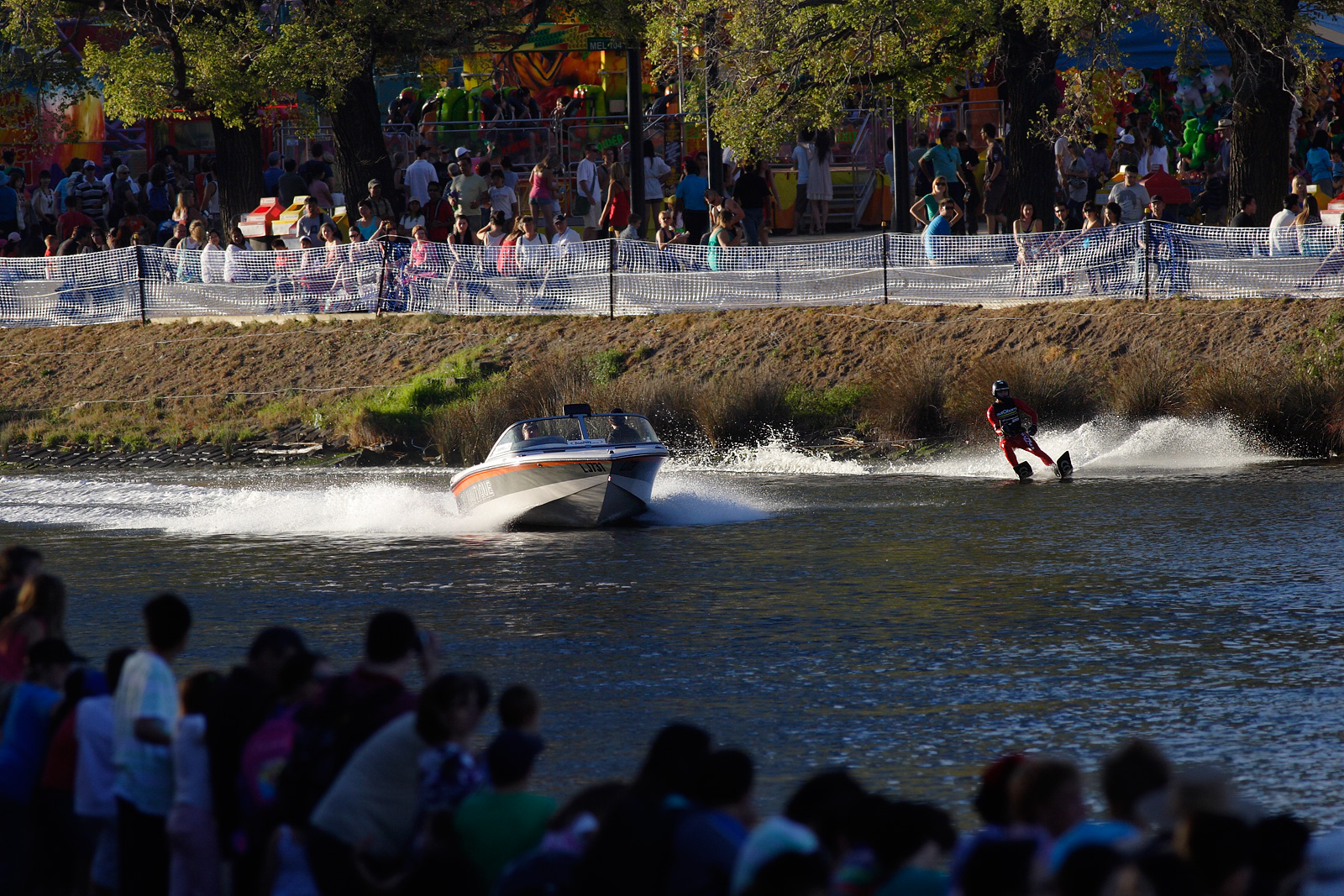
Moomba waterskiing

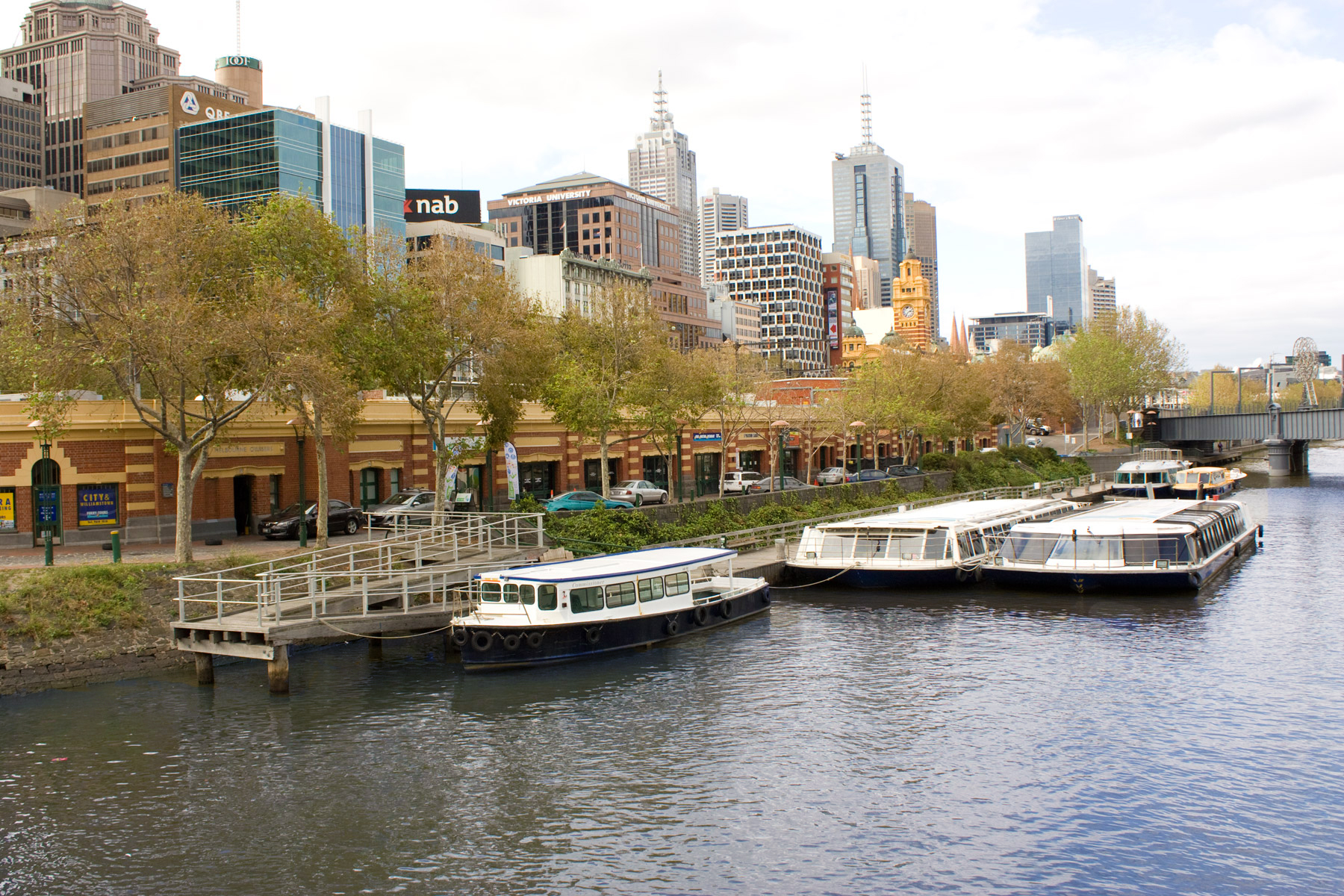
Cruise boats on the river

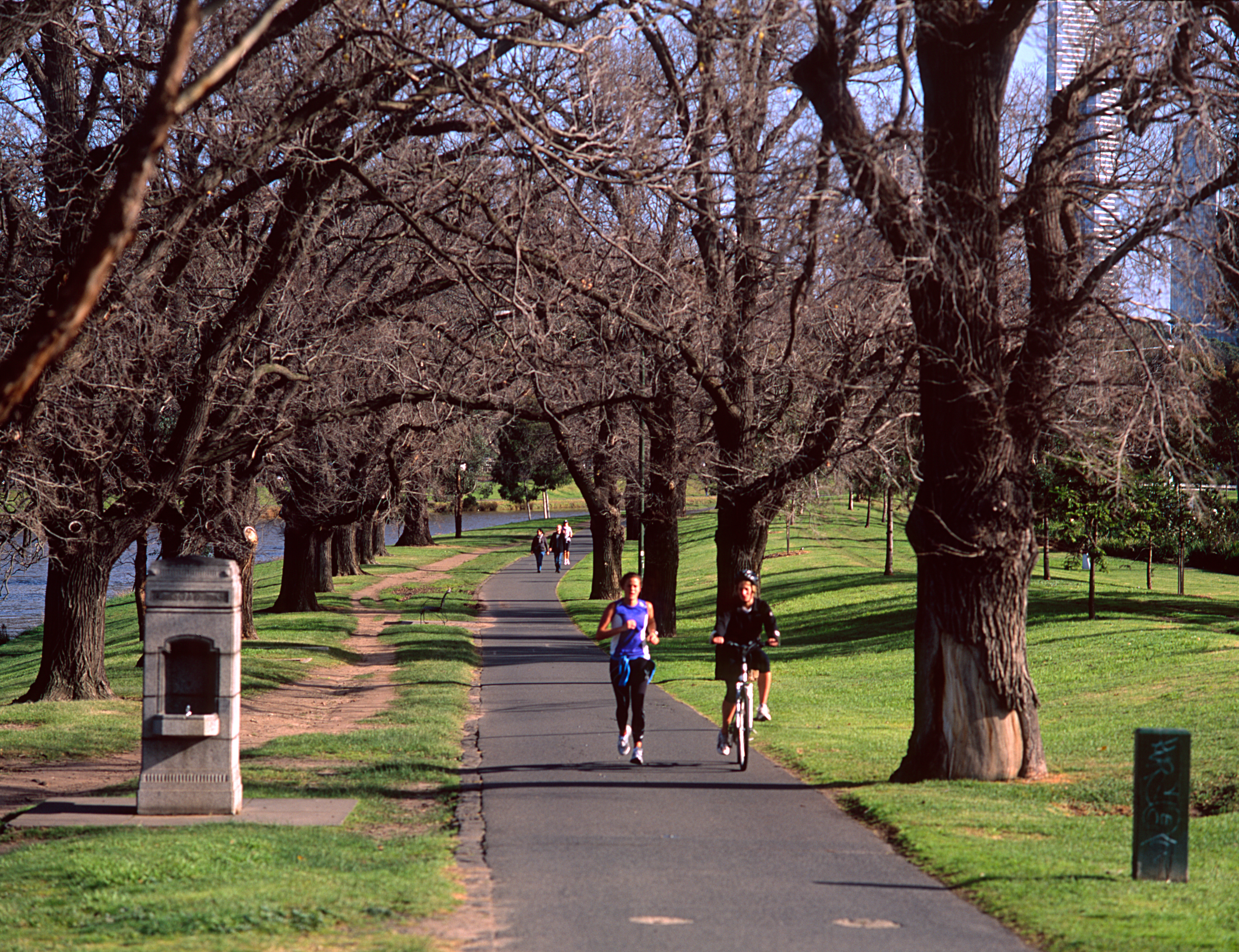
Yarra River walk paths

Throughout its length, the waters of the Yarra River and its banks are used for boating, rowing, water skiing, kayaking, canoeing, swimming, fishing, cycling, running, and walking. In the river's upper reaches, fishing is most popular. Upstream of Launching Place, the river becomes quite narrow and recreational use is limited. In the middle reaches, canoeing and kayaking is popular, there are a few rapids of easy to medium difficulty depending on the water level.

Swimming is also popular in the middle reaches throughout winter, particularly around Warrandyte. Around this area there are submerged mining shafts which can cause undertows that suck swimmers under the surface and into the shafts. In the period between 2004 and 2008, three people died in this manner in Warrandyte alone. Swimming is safer downstream, but not advisable below Dights Falls due to the high levels of pollution and high boating traffic. The Yarra River once held the world's largest swimming event, the Race to Prince's Bridge. The 3-mile (4.8 km) course ran in the lower reaches, from Twickenham Ferry (now MacRobertson Bridge) to Princes Bridge. The race often attracted more than 500 competitors and large numbers of onlookers.

In the lower reaches, the river is mostly used for rowing. There are several rowing sheds along the city stretch east of the Princes Bridge. At certain times of the year, particularly during the Moomba Festival, this stretch of the river is occupied by water skiing courses and jumps. Two major off-road, sealed trails, the Yarra River Trail and Capital City Trail, follow the river on its course through the city, while part of the Bayside Trail also connects with the river.

The river is also popular for boating. In the residential suburb of Toorak, some of the larger mansions have private boat moorings, while Fisherman's Bend, Newport, Williamstown, and newer developments in Melbourne Docklands host larger marinas. Boating is difficult beyond Hawthorn and impossible past Dights Falls. It is mostly concentrated to central Melbourne, where cruises go up and down the river and ferries operate.

=== Navigation ===
The river can be used by any member of the public provided they abide by the rules of Parks Victoria, who administer the river upstream of Bolte Bridge, and the Port of Melbourne Corporation, who administer the area downstream of Bolte Bridge. There is a maximum speed limit of 5 knots (9.3 km/h) for all boats operating on the river upstream from Bolte Bridge. Sections of the river are occasionally closed for public events such as Moomba, New Year's Eve, and rowing events.

The river is navigable by most boats from its entrance in Hobsons Bay to Dights Falls, a stretch of 22 km (14 mi), and is subject to tidal variations and submerged objects. There are four bridges on the Yarra River with limited height clearances at high tide:

- Charles Grimes Bridge: 3.2 m (10 ft)
- Spencer Street Bridge: 2.3 m (7 ft 7 in) (can be less than 2 m or 6 ft 7 in at extreme high tides, which happen once a month)
- Kings Bridge: 2.4 m (7 ft 10 in)
- Queens Bridge: 2.4 m (7 ft 10 in)

== See also ==
- Crossings of the Yarra River
- Geography of the Yarra River
- Geology of Victoria
- Lakes and Reservoirs in Melbourne
- Parklands adjoining the Yarra River
- Brushy Creek (Melbourne)
- Yarra Ranges National Park
- Yarra Valley
