= Little Peninsula Tunnel =

Diversion of the Yarra River, Victoria, Australia

Coordinates: 37°42′44″S 145°48′29″E

The Little Peninsula Tunnel is a small river diversion tunnel on the upper Yarra River near McMahons Creek, around 80 km East of Melbourne, Victoria, Australia. The tunnel was dug in the 1860s by alluvial gold miners to provide access to the bed of the Yarra River.

The tunnel is a short walk from the Little Peninsula Tunnel Picnic Ground, about 14 km east of Warburton on the Woods Point Road.

The site is listed in the Victorian Heritage Inventory.

== See also ==
- Big Peninsula Tunnel
