= Big Peninsula Tunnel =

Coordinates: 37°42′19″S 145°49′10″E

The Big Peninsula Tunnel is a small river diversion tunnel on the upper Yarra River near McMahons Creek, around 80 km east of Melbourne, Victoria, Australia. The tunnel was dug in 1864, during the Victorian gold rush, by alluvial gold miners to provide access to the bed of the Yarra River. Big Peninsula Tunnel is a square section, about 2 metres high and wide, and approximately 25 metres long.

The tunnel can be accessed from a small carpark off the Woods Point Road, approximately 15 km east of Warburton and 1 km below McMahons Creek. The Goldfields Walking Trail starts nearby.

The site is listed in the Victorian Heritage Inventory.

== See also ==
- Little Peninsula Tunnel
