= Richards and Sons Logging Winch Site =

Heritage-listed steam-powered log-winching station in Victoria, Australia

- Location of the site in Victoria
- Interactive map of the Richards and Sons Logging Winch Site area

General information
- Status: Completed
- Type: Steam-powered log-winching station
- Location: Road 15, McMahons Creek, Yarra Ranges, Victoria, Australia
- Coordinates: 37°47′48″S 145°54′13″E
- Completed: 1936; 90 years ago
- Closed: 1939 (abandoned)

Victorian Heritage Register
- Official name: Richards and Sons Logging Winch Site
- Type: Registered place; Registered archaeological place
- Designated: 20 August 1982
- Reference no.: H1739
- Heritage overlay no.: HO106
- Category: Forestry and Timber Industry

Register of the National Estate
- Official name: Richards and Sons Logging Winch Site
- Type: Defunct register
- Designated: undated

The Richards and Sons Logging Winch Site is a steam-powered log-winching station located on Road 15 in McMahons Creek, in the Yarra Ranges, in the north eastern suburbs of Melbourne, in Victoria, Australia.

Built in 1936 on the traditional lands of the Wurundjeri people, the site was added to the Victorian Heritage Register on 20 August 1982 in recognition of its historical, archaeological, and scientific significance; and was also added to the non-statutory and now defunct Register of the National Estate on an unknown date.

== History ==
Richards & Sons carried on logging and sawmilling operations in the Starvation Creek area from 1916 to 1938. Their last steam log winching station was established on Roy Spur c. 1936. The family abandoned the remaining plant after access tramways to it were destroyed in the 1939 bushfires. The Warburton district was Victoria's premier logging area for the first three decades of the twentieth century, and the district's sawmillers played an important role in the introduction of new methods and technology. Richards & Sons log winching site is important for its manifestation of this facet of the State's forest industry.

== Description ==
The site includes a steam logging plant including the double-drum outrigger steam logging winch, Jackass boiler, and single cylinder action steam engine driving two outrigger drums, and associated infrastructure including tools, wire cable, bull wheels, steel rails, trolley wheels and crab winch, and all archaeological deposits and artefacts.

The Richards & Sons Log Winching site is scientifically significant because of its extraordinary intactness and being one of about a dozen insitu historic steam winches still surviving in Victoria. The site is especially unique in containing two different types of winches illustrating the replacement of old adaptive technology with new purpose built imported machinery. Only one other single cylinder steam logging engine is known in the State and the Russell Allport double drum outrigger steam logging winch is rare in Victoria.

== See also ==
- Timber industry in Australia
- List of places on the Victorian Heritage Register in the Shire of Yarra Ranges
