= Victorian Heritage Inventory =

Statutory register of historical archaeological sites in Victoria, Australia

The Victorian Heritage Inventory, commonly known as the Heritage Inventory, is a list of known historical archaeological sites in Victoria, Australia. It is maintained by Heritage Victoria, the Victorian State Government’s principal cultural (non-Indigenous) heritage agency.

The Heritage Inventory, which lists over 5000 sites, can be searched online through the Victorian Heritage Database. The inventory is also available in JSON format through an authentication-free RESTful API.

As of June 2022 the database contains information from 33 Heritage Authorities. This includes:

- City of Ballarat
- City of Banyule
- City of Boroondara
- City of Brimbank
- Shire of Cardinia
- City of Casey
- City of Darebin
- City of Glen Eira
- Shire of Glenelg
- Golden Plains Shire
- City of Greater Bendigo
- City of Greater Geelong
- Shire of Hindmarsh
- City of Hobsons Bay
- City of Manningham
- City of Maribyrnong
- City of Maroondah
- City of Melton
- City of Moonee Valley
- Shire of Moorabool
- City of Merri-bek
- National Trust of Australia
- Shire of Nillumbik
- Shire of Northern Grampians
- Borough of Queenscliffe
- South Gippsland Shire
- Shire of Southern Grampians
- City of Stonnington
- Victorian War Heritage Inventory
- Victorian Heritage Inventory
- Victorian Heritage Register
- City of Yarra
- Yarra Ranges Shire
