= McMahons Creek, Victoria =

McMahons Creek
- Town
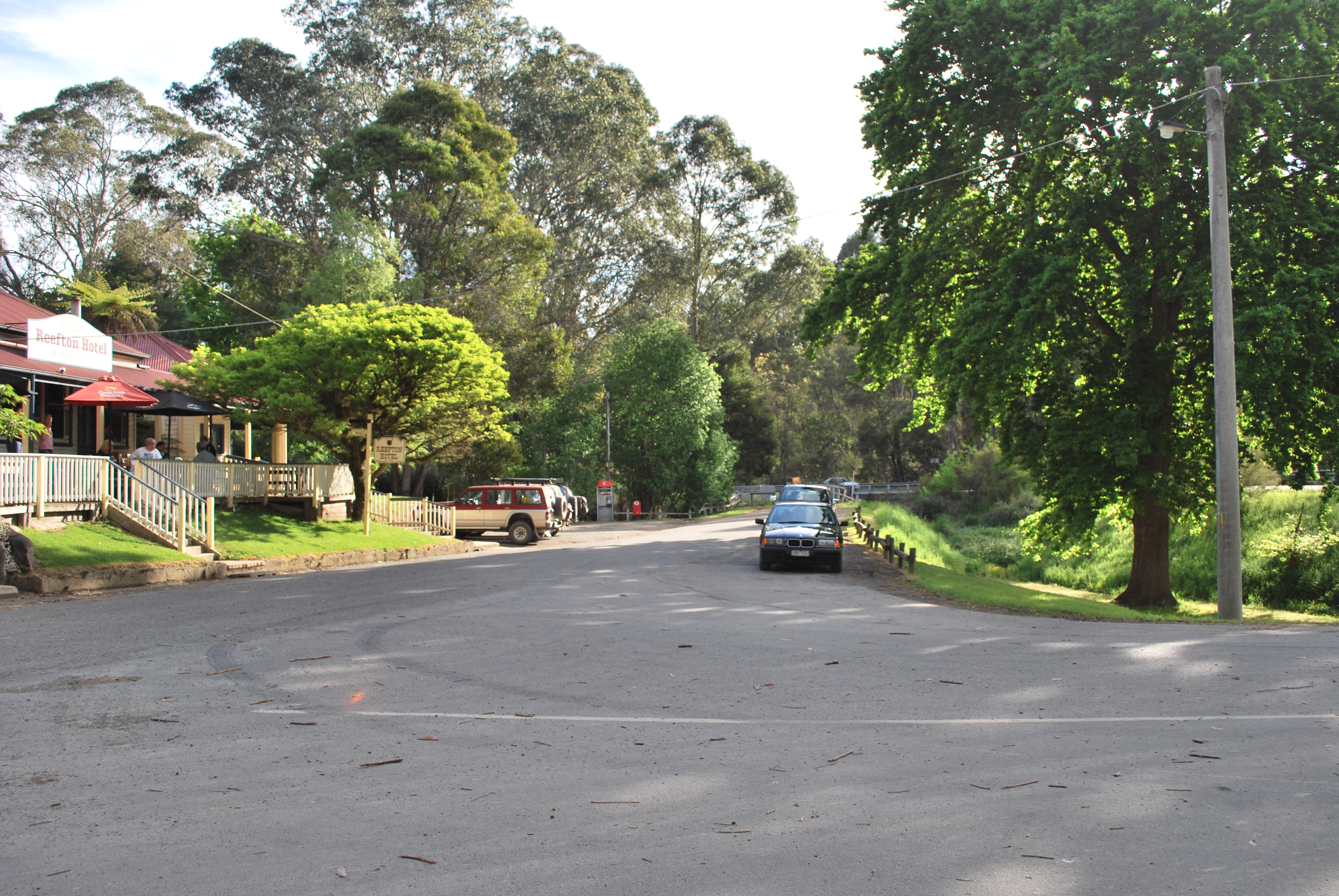
- Reefton Hotel is actually not in Reefton but rather it is in McMahons Creek.

- Interactive map of McMahons Creek
- Coordinates: 37°42′S 145°50′E
- Country: Australia
- State: Victoria
- LGA: Shire of Yarra Ranges

Government
  - State electorate: Eildon
  - Federal division: McEwen

Population
  - Total: 143 (2021 census)
- Postcode: 3799

McMahons Creek is a locality in Victoria, Australia, on the Warburton–Woods Point Road bordering the Yarra Ranges National Park, located within the Shire of Yarra Ranges local government area. McMahons Creek recorded a population of 143 at the 2021 census.

== History ==
McMahons Creek Post Office opened on 1 July 1865, closed in 1870, reopened in 1901 and closed again in 1968.

=== Heritage listings ===
The following places in McMahons Creek are listed on the Victorian Heritage Register:

- Old Federal Mill, Big Creek Road
- Richards and Sons Logging Winch Site, Road 15
