= List of Melbourne suburbs =

Suburbs of the Greater Melbourne region

This is a list of Municipalities and their suburbs (neighbourhoods), townships, and rural localities in the greater metropolitan area of Melbourne, Victoria, Australia. Suburbs are defined here as localities within the legislated Urban Growth Boundary, all of which have some urban development. This line is the effective boundary of suburban Melbourne; outside it lie rural areas, and some townships of varying size.

Each suburb is followed by its postcode. Some suburbs share the same postcode.

Indented entries are recognised by the Geographic Names Board as unbounded neighbourhoods except when italicised. Those italicised usually have, or have had, Post Offices open under that name.

In Australia, a suburb is a named and bounded locality of a city, with an urban nature, regardless of its location within that city. The term "inner suburbs" refers to the older, denser, urban areas closer to the original colonial centre of the cities and "outer suburbs" refers to the urban areas more remote from the centre of the metropolitan area. Sometimes the term "middle ring suburb" is used to refer to areas that were urbanised early in a city's expansion after the inner suburbs had become established. This differs from British and North American usage, in which the term "suburb" is usually not applied to urban areas (neighbourhoods) that are close to a major city centre or inside the central city's local government boundary.

== Inner City municipalities and their suburbs (followed by their 4-digit postcodes) ==
Suburbs in the inner Melbourne councils, north to south: Pink – City of Yarra; Red – City of Melbourne; Dark red – City of Port Phillip

=== City of Melbourne ===
- Carlton 3053
  - Carlton South
- Carlton North 3054 (Shared with City of Yarra)
- Docklands 3008
- East Melbourne 3002
  - Jolimont (the name of the railway station)
- Flemington 3031 (Shared with City of Moonee Valley)
- Kensington 3031
- Melbourne 3000 (Central business district)
- Melbourne 3004 (St Kilda Road area, shared with City of Port Phillip)
- North Melbourne 3051
  - Hotham Hill
  - Macaulay (the name of the railway station)
- Parkville 3052
  - Royal Park
- Port Melbourne 3207 (Shared with City of Port Phillip)
  - Fishermans Bend (formerly Fishermen's Bend)
  - Garden City
- Southbank 3006 (Shared with City of Port Phillip)
- South Wharf 3006
- South Yarra 3141 (Shared with City of Stonnington)
- West Melbourne 3003
  - Coode Island

See Melbourne central business district for precincts in the CBD.

=== City of Port Phillip ===
- Albert Park 3206
- Balaclava 3183
- Elwood 3184
  - Brighton Road
- Melbourne 3004 (St Kilda Road area, shared with City of Melbourne)
  - Albert Park Barracks
- Middle Park 3206
- Port Melbourne 3207 (Shared with City of Melbourne)
  - Beacon Cove
  - Fishermans Bend
  - Garden City
  - Graham (the name of the closed railway station)
  - Sandridge, an earlier name for Port Melbourne
- Ripponlea 3185
- St Kilda 3182
  - St Kilda South
- St Kilda East 3183 (Shared with City of Glen Eira)
- St Kilda West 3182
  - St Kilda Junction
- Southbank 3006 (Shared with City of Melbourne)
- South Melbourne 3205
  - City Road
  - Emerald Hill
  - Montague (the name of the closed railway station)
- South Wharf 3006 (Shared with City of Melbourne)

=== City of Yarra ===
- Abbotsford 3067
  - Victoria Park (the name of the railway station)
- Alphington 3078 (Shared with City of Darebin)
- Burnley 3121
- Carlton North 3054 (Shared with City of Melbourne)
  - North Carlton
- Clifton Hill 3068
- Collingwood 3066
  - Collingwood North
- Cremorne 3121
  - Richmond East
- Fairfield 3078 (Shared with City of Darebin)
  - Yarra Bend
- Fitzroy 3065
  - Eastern Hill
  - Fitzroy South
- Fitzroy North 3068
  - North Fitzroy
  - Rushall (the name of the railway station)
- Princes Hill 3054
- Richmond 3121
  - Burnley North
  - North Richmond (the name of the railway station)
  - Richmond South
  - Victoria Gardens
  - West Richmond (the name of the railway station)

== Northern municipalities and their suburbs ==
Suburbs of the middle northern Melbourne councils. West to east: Brown – City of Merri-bek; Orange – City of Darebin; Tan – City of Banyule

=== City of Banyule ===
- Bellfield 3081
- Briar Hill 3088
- Bundoora 3083 (Shared with City of Darebin and City of Whittlesea)//
  - Greenwood Village
  - Janefield
  - Larundel
  - Polaris
- Eaglemont 3084
- Eltham 3095 (Shared with Shire of Nillumbik)
- Eltham North 3095 (Shared with Shire of Nillumbik)
- Greensborough 3088 (Shared with Shire of Nillumbik)
  - Apollo Parkways
  - Grace Park
  - Green Hills
- Heidelberg 3084
- Heidelberg Heights 3081
  - Heidelberg North
- Heidelberg West 3081
- Ivanhoe 3079
  - Darebin (the name of the railway station)
  - Fairy Hills
  - Ivanhoe North
- Ivanhoe East 3079
- Lower Plenty 3093
- Macleod 3085 (Shared with City of Darebin)
  - Mont Park
  - Macleod West
- Montmorency 3094
- Rosanna 3084
  - Banyule
- St Helena 3088
- Viewbank 3084
  - Rosanna East
- Watsonia 3087
- Watsonia North 3087
- Yallambie 3085

=== City of Darebin ===
- Alphington 3078 (Shared with City of Yarra)
- Bundoora 3083 (Shared with City of Banyule and City of Whittlesea)
  - Mount Cooper
- Coburg 3058 (Shared with City of Merri-bek)
- Coburg North 3058 (Shared with City of Merri-bek)
- Fairfield 3078 (Shared with City of Yarra)
- Kingsbury 3083
- Macleod 3085 (Shared with City of Banyule)
- Northcote 3070
  - Croxton (the name of the railway station)
  - Croxton East
  - Dennis (the name of the railway station)
  - Merri (the name of the railway station)
  - Northcote South
  - Rucker's Hill
  - Westgarth (the name of the railway station)
- Preston 3072
  - Bell (the name of the railway station)
  - Darebin Park
  - Gilberton
  - Northland
  - Preston Lake
  - Preston West
  - Regent (Shared with Reservoir) (the name of the railway station)
  - Regent West
  - South Preston
  - Sylvester
- Reservoir 3073
  - Gilbank
  - Regent (Shared with Preston)
  - Reservoir East
  - Reservoir North
  - Reservoir South
  - Ruthven (the name of the railway station)
  - Summerhill
- Thornbury 3071
  - Pender
  - Thornbury North

=== City of Hume ===
==== Suburbs ====
- Attwood 3049
- Broadmeadows 3047
  - Broadmeadows South
  - Broadmeadows Square
  - Fentona
  - Meadow Fair
- Campbellfield 3061
- Coolaroo 3048
- Craigieburn 3064
- Dallas 3047
  - Upfield (the name of the railway station)
- Diggers Rest 3427 (Shared with City of Melton)
- Gladstone Park 3043
- Greenvale 3059
- Jacana 3047
- Kalkallo 3064
- Keilor 3036 (Shared with City of Brimbank)
- Meadow Heights 3048
- Melbourne Airport 3045
- Mickleham 3064
  - Konagaderra Springs
- Roxburgh Park 3064
- Somerton 3062
- Sunbury 3429
  - Jacksons Hill
  - Canterbury Hills
  - Mount Holden
  - Goonawarra
  - Rupertswood (the name of the closed railway station)
- Tullamarine 3043 (Shared with City of Brimbank and City of Merri-bek)
- Westmeadows 3049

==== Townships and rural localities ====
- Bulla 3428
- Clarkefield 3430 (Shared with Shire of Macedon Ranges)
  - Lancefield Junction
- Oaklands Junction 3063
  - Oaklands Park
- Wildwood 3429
- Yuroke 3063

=== City of Merri-bek ===
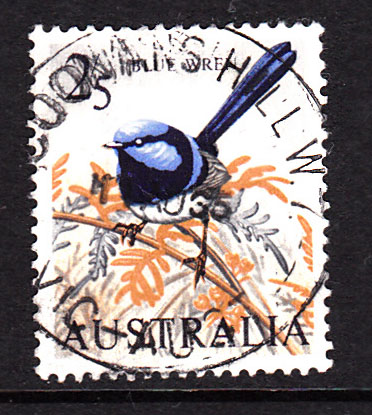
A 1965 postmark of Coonans Hill, a neighbourhood of the suburb of Pascoe Vale South

- Brunswick 3056
  - Anstey (the name of the railway station)
  - Brunswick Lake
  - Brunswick North
  - Jewell (the name of the railway station)
- Brunswick East 3057
  - Lygon Street North
  - Moreland East
  - Sumner
- Brunswick West 3055
  - Grantham Street
  - Brunswick South
  - Moonee Vale
  - Moreland West
- Coburg 3058 (Shared with City of Darebin)
  - Coburg East
  - Moreland (the name of the railway station)
- Coburg North 3058 (Shared with City of Darebin)
  - Merlynston (the name of the railway station)
  - Newlands (Estate)
  - Batman (the name of the railway station)
- Fawkner 3060
  - Fawkner East
  - Fawkner North
  - Gowrie
  - Moomba Park
- Glenroy 3046
  - Westbreen
- Gowanbrae 3043
  - Fern Ridge
  - Willowbrook
- Hadfield 3046
- Oak Park 3046
- Pascoe Vale 3044
- Pascoe Vale South 3044
  - Coonans Hill
- Tullamarine 3043 (Shared with City of Brimbank and City of Hume)

=== Shire of Nillumbik ===
==== Suburbs ====
- Diamond Creek 3089
- Doreen 3754 (Shared with City of Whittlesea)
- Eltham 3095 (Shared with City of Banyule)
  - Glen Park
- Eltham North 3095 (Shared with City of Banyule)
- Greensborough 3088 (a small area: Shared with City of Banyule)
- Hurstbridge 3099
  - Midhurst
- North Warrandyte 3113
  - Sloan Hill
- Plenty 3090
- Research 3095
- Wattle Glen 3096
  - Balee, the original name of the railway station
  - Diamond Creek Upper, a former name

==== Townships and rural localities ====
- Arthurs Creek 3099
- Bend of Islands 3097
- Christmas Hills 3775
  - Rob Roy
- Cottles Bridge 3099
  - Streamville
- Kangaroo Ground 3097
  - Kangaroo Ground South
  - Pretty Hill
- Kinglake 3763 (Shared with Shire of Murrindindi)
  - Dashville
  - Mount Slide
- Kinglake West 3778 (Shared with City of Whittlesea and Shire of Murrindindi)
- Nutfield 3099
- Panton Hill 3759
- St Andrews 3761
  - Mittons Bridge
  - Queenstown
- Smiths Gully 3760
- Strathewen 3099
  - Eagle Nest
- Watsons Creek 3097
- Yan Yean 3755 (Shared with City of Whittlesea)
- Yarrambat 3091
  - Tan(c)ks Corner

=== City of Whittlesea ===
==== Suburbs ====
- Bundoora 3083 (Shared with City of Banyule and City of Darebin)
- Donnybrook 3064
- Doreen 3754 (Shared with Shire of Nillumbik)
  - Hazel Glen
  - Laurimar
  - Linton Grange
  - Yan Yean South
- Epping 3076
  - Aurora
  - Epping North
- Lalor 3075
  - Lalor Plaza
- Mernda 3754
- Mill Park 3082
- South Morang 3752
- Thomastown 3074
  - Keon Park (the name of the railway station)
- Wollert 3750

==== Townships and rural localities ====
- Beveridge 3753 (Shared with Shire of Mitchell)
  - Merriang
- Eden Park 3757
- Humevale 3757
  - Scrubby Creek
- Kinglake West 3778 (Shared with Shire of Murrindindi and Shire of Nillumbik)
- Whittlesea 3757
  - Bruces Creek
  - Glenvale
  - Tommys Hut
  - Wallaby Creek
- Woodstock 3755
- Yan Yean 3755 (Shared with Shire of Nillumbik)

== Eastern municipalities and their suburbs ==
=== City of Boroondara ===
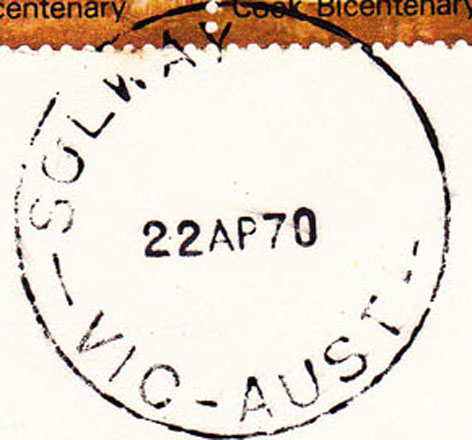
Solway postmark with SE11 area code removed

- Ashburton 3147
  - Alamein (the name of the railway station)
  - Solway (in the south with a Post Office open 1954 to 1978)
- Balwyn 3103
  - Balwyn East
  - Stradbroke Park
- Balwyn North 3104
  - Bellevue
  - Fortuna
  - Greythorn
  - Trentwood
  - Yooralla
- Camberwell 3124
  - Camberwell North
  - Camberwell South
  - Camberwell West
  - East Camberwell (the name of the railway station)
  - Hartwell (the name of the railway station)
  - Highfield Park
  - Middle Camberwell
  - Riversdale (the name of the railway station)
  - Willison (the name of the railway station)
- Canterbury 3126
  - Shenley
- Deepdene 3103
- Glen Iris 3146 (Shared with City of Stonnington)
- Hawthorn 3122
  - Auburn South
  - Barker (the name of the closed railway station)
  - Glenferrie (the name of the railway station)
  - Glenferrie South
  - Hawthorn North
  - Hawthorn West
- Hawthorn East 3123
  - Auburn (the name of the railway station)
  - Hawthorn South
  - Upper Hawthorn
- Kew 3101
  - Balwyn West
  - Cotham
  - Studley Park
  - Willsmere
- Kew East 3102
  - Harp
  - Kew North
- Mont Albert 3127 (Shared with City of Whitehorse)
- Surrey Hills 3127 (Shared with City of Whitehorse)
  - Chatham (the name of the railway station)
  - Elgar Park
  - Faversham

=== City of Knox ===
- Bayswater 3153
- Boronia 3155
- Ferntree Gully 3156
  - Mountain Gate
- Knoxfield 3180
  - Knox Park
- Lysterfield 3156 (shared with Shire of Yarra Ranges)
- Rowville 3178
- Sassafras 3787 (shared with Shire of Yarra Ranges)
- Scoresby 3179
- The Basin 3154
- Upper Ferntree Gully 3156 (shared with Shire of Yarra Ranges)
- Wantirna 3152
  - Knox City Centre
- Wantirna South 3152
  - Studfield

=== City of Manningham ===
- Bulleen 3105
  - Bulleen South
- Doncaster 3108
  - Doncaster Hill
  - Waldau (Shared with Doncaster East)
- Doncaster East 3109
  - Doncaster Heights
  - The Pines, shopping centre
  - Tunstall Square
  - Waldau (Shared with Doncaster)
  - Donburn
- Donvale 3111
- Nunawading 3131 (shared with City of Whitehorse)
- Park Orchards 3114 (shared with City of Maroondah)
- Ringwood North 3134 (shared with City of Maroondah)
- Templestowe 3106
  - Serpells
- Templestowe Lower 3107
  - Macedon
  - Templestowe Heights
  - Templestowe West
- Warrandyte 3113
  - Goldfields/West End
  - Pound Bend
- Warrandyte South 3134
- Wonga Park 3115 (Shared with City of Maroondah and Shire of Yarra Ranges)

=== City of Maroondah ===
- Bayswater North 3153
- Croydon 3136
  - Burnt Bridge
  - Nelsons Hill
  - Clifford Park
- Croydon Hills 3136
- Croydon North 3136
- Croydon South 3136
- Heathmont 3135
  - Eastwood
- Kilsyth 3137 (Shared with Shire of Yarra Ranges)
- Kilsyth South 3137
- Park Orchards 3114 (Shared with City of Manningham)
- Ringwood 3134
  - Heatherdale (the name of the railway station)
  - Heathwood
  - Cherrydene
- Ringwood East 3135
  - Bedford Road
- Ringwood North 3134 (Shared with City of Manningham)
- Vermont 3133 (Shared with City of Whitehorse)
- Warranwood 3134
  - Norwood
- Wonga Park 3115 (Shared with City of Manningham and Shire of Yarra Ranges)

=== City of Whitehorse ===
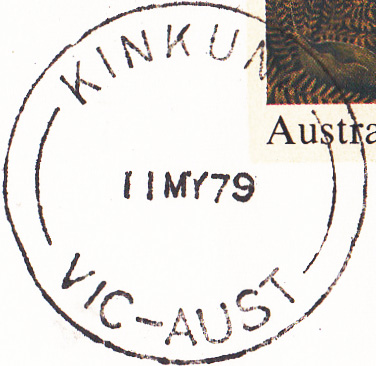
The last day of operation of the office

- Blackburn 3130
  - Laburnum (the name of the railway station)
  - Bellbird
- Blackburn North 3130
- Blackburn South 3130
  - Kinkuna
- Box Hill 3128
  - Box Hill Central
- Box Hill North 3129
  - Kerrimuir
  - Koonung
  - Mont Albert North 3129
- Box Hill South 3128
  - Houston
- Burwood 3125 (Shared with City of Monash)
  - Bennettswood
  - Surrey Hills South
  - Wattle Park
- Burwood East 3151
  - Burwood Heights
  - Tally Ho
- Forest Hill 3131
  - Brentford Square
- Mitcham 3132
  - Rangeview
- Mont Albert 3127 (Shared with City of Boroondara)
- Mont Albert North 3129
- Nunawading 3131 (Shared with City of Manningham)
  - Parkmore
  - Tunstall
- Surrey Hills 3127 (Shared with City of Boroondara)
- Vermont 3133 (Shared with City of Maroondah)
  - Vermont Estate
  - Vermont West
- Vermont South 3133

=== Shire of Yarra Ranges ===
==== Suburbs ====
- Belgrave 3160
- Belgrave Heights 3160
- Belgrave South 3160
- Chirnside Park 3116
  - Black Springs
- Kilsyth 3137 (Shared with City of Maroondah)
- Lilydale 3140
- Montrose 3765
- Mooroolbark 3138
- Mount Evelyn 3796
  - Mckillop
- Selby 3159
- Tecoma 3160
- Upper Ferntree Gully 3156 (mainly in the City of Knox)
- Upwey 3158
- Wonga Park 3115 (Shared with City of Manningham and City of Maroondah)

==== Townships and rural localities ====
- Badger Creek 3777
- Beenak 3139
  - Basan Corner
- Big Pats Creek 3799
- Cambarville 3779
  - Fifteen Mile
  - Kel Junction
  - Montys Hut
  - Shaw
  - The Triangle
- Chum Creek 3777
  - Healesville
- Coldstream 3770
  - Coldstream West
- Dixons Creek 3775
- Don Valley 3139
- East Warburton 3799
- Emerald 3782 (shared with Shire of Cardinia)
- Fernshaw 3778
- Ferny Creek 3786
  - One Tree Hill
- Gilderoy 3797
- Gladysdale 3797
  - Saint Benedicts
- Gruyere 3770
  - Cahillton, a former name
  - Yeringberg
- Healesville 3777
  - Tims Corner
- Hoddles Creek 3139
- Kallista 3791
  - Beagleys Bridge
  - Sassafras South
- Kalorama 3766
- Launching Place 3139
- Lysterfield 3156 (shared with City of Knox where there is suburban development)
- Macclesfield 3782
- Matlock 3723 (shared with Shire of Mansfield)
- McMahons Creek 3799
- Menzies Creek 3159 (shared with Shire of Cardinia)
- Millgrove 3799
- Monbulk 3793
  - Nathania Springs
- Mount Dandenong 3767
- Mount Toolebewong 3777
- Narre Warren East 3804
- Olinda 3788
  - Harmony Vale
- Powelltown 3797
  - Black Sands
  - Erreys
  - Nayook West
  - Quongup
- Reefton 3799
  - Upper Yarra Dam
- Sassafras 3787 (shared with City of Knox)
  - Sassafras Gully
- Seville 3139
- Seville East 3139
  - Killara
- Sherbrooke 3789
- Silvan 3795
  - Burleigh
  - Silvan South
- Steels Creek 3775
- Tarrawarra 3775
- The Patch 3792
- Three Bridges 3797
- Toolangi 3777 (shared with Shire of Murrindindi)
- Toorongo 3833 (shared with Shire of Baw Baw)
- Tremont 3785
- Wandin East 3139
- Wandin North 3139
  - Wandin Yallock
- Warburton 3799
  - Old Warburton
- Wesburn 3799
  - Britannia Creek
  - Tarrango
- Woori Yallock 3139
- Yarra Glen 3775
  - Tanana
- Yarra Junction 3797
- Yellingbo 3139
  - Parslow, a former name
- Yering 3770

== Southeastern municipalities and their suburbs ==
=== City of Bayside ===
- Beaumaris 3193
- Black Rock 3193
  - Black Rock North
  - Half Moon Bay
  - Ricketts Point
- Brighton 3186
  - Dendy
  - Were Street
  - Brighton Beach (the name of the railway station)
  - Brighton North (the name of the railway station)
  - Middle Brighton (the name of the railway station)
- Brighton East 3187
  - North Road
- Cheltenham 3192 (Shared with City of Kingston)
  - Pennydale
- Hampton 3188
  - Castlefield
- Hampton East 3188
- Highett 3190 (Shared with City of Kingston)
- Sandringham 3191

=== Shire of Cardinia ===
==== Suburbs ====
- Beaconsfield 3807 (shared with City of Casey)
- Officer 3809
  - Officer South
- Pakenham 3810
  - Toomuc Valley

==== Townships and rural localities ====
- Avonsleigh 3782
- Bayles 3981
  - Yallock
- Beaconsfield Upper 3808
  - Cations
- Bunyip 3815
- Bunyip North 3815
- Caldermeade 3984
- Cardinia 3978
  - Lisbaun
- Catani 3981
- Clematis 3782
- Cockatoo 3781
  - Fielder
  - Wright
- Cora Lynn 3814
- Dalmore 3981
- Dewhurst 3809
- Emerald 3782 (shared with Shire of Yarra Ranges)
  - Lakeside
  - Nobelius
- Garfield 3814
- Garfield North 3814
- Gembrook 3783
  - Cornucopia
  - Gilwell Park
  - Whites Corner
- Guys Hill 3807
- Heath Hill 3981 (shared with Shire of Baw Baw)
- Iona 3815
- Koo Wee Rup 3981
  - Dalmore East
- Koo Wee Rup North 3891
- Lang Lang 3984
- Lang Lang East 3894
- Longwarry 3816 (shared with Shire of Baw Baw)
- Maryknoll 3812
- Menzies Creek 3159 (shared with Shire of Yarra Ranges)
- Modella 3816 (shared with Shire of Baw Baw)
- Monomeith 3984
- Mount Burnett 3781
- Nangana 3781
- Nar Nar Goon 3812
- Nar Nar Goon North 3812
- Nyora 3987 (shared with Shire of Baw Baw and South Gippsland Shire)
- Officer South 3809
- Pakenham South 3810
- Pakenham Upper 3810
- Rythdale 3810
- Tonimbuk 3815
- Tynong 3813
- Tynong North 3813
- Vervale 3814
- Yannathan 3894

=== City of Casey ===
==== Suburbs ====
- Beaconsfield 3807 (shared with Shire of Cardinia)
- Berwick 3806
- Botanic Ridge 3977
- Clyde 3978
- Clyde North 3978
- Cranbourne 3977
- Cranbourne East 3977
- Cranbourne North 3977
  - Merinda Park (the name of the railway station)
- Cranbourne West 3977
- Cranbourne South 3977
  - Centreville
  - Brompton (name of the estate)
- Doveton 3177
- Endeavour Hills 3802
- Eumemmerring 3177
- Hallam 3803
- Hampton Park 3976
- Junction Village 3977
- Lynbrook 3975
- Lyndhurst 3975 (shared with City of Greater Dandenong)
- Narre Warren 3805
- Narre Warren North 3804
- Narre Warren South 3805

==== Townships and rural localities ====
- Blind Bight 3980
- Cannons Creek 3977
- Devon Meadows 3977
  - Fiveways
- Harkaway 3806
- Lysterfield South 3156
- Pearcedale 3912 (shared with Shire of Mornington Peninsula)
- Tooradin 3980
- Warneet 3980
  - Chinaman Island

=== City of Greater Dandenong ===
==== Suburbs ====
- Dandenong 3175
  - Cleeland
  - Dunearn
  - Dandenong East
  - Dandenong Plaza
  - Oakwood Park
- Dandenong North 3175
  - Lyndale
- Dandenong South 3175
- Keysborough 3173
  - Parkmore
- Lyndhurst 3975 (shared with City of Casey)
- Noble Park 3174
  - Harrisfield
  - Noble Park East
  - Yarraman
- Noble Park North 3174
- Springvale 3171
  - Sandown Park (the name of the railway station)
- Springvale South 3172

==== Rural locality ====
- Bangholme 3175

=== City of Frankston ===
==== Suburbs ====
- Carrum Downs 3201
  - Banyan
- Frankston 3199
  - Eliza Heights
  - Frankston East
  - Frankston Heights
  - Karingal
  - Leawarra (the name of the railway station)
  - Long Island
  - Mile Bridge
  - Mount Erin
  - Olivers Hill
- Frankston North 3200
  - Pines Forest
- Frankston South 3199
  - Baden Powell
- Langwarrin 3910
  - Gateway (name of the shopping centre)
- Sandhurst 3977
  - Sandarra Estate
- Seaford 3198
  - Belvedere Park
  - Kananook
- Skye 3977
  - Lyndhurst South, former name
  - Skye Valley Estate (name of the estate)

==== Rural locality ====
- Langwarrin South 3911

=== City of Glen Eira ===
- Bentleigh 3204
  - Patterson (the name of the railway station)
- Bentleigh East 3165
  - Coatesville
  - Eastmoor
- Brighton East 3187 (shared with City of Bayside)
- Carnegie 3163
- Caulfield 3162
- Caulfield East 3145
- Caulfield North 3161
  - Caulfield Junction
  - Crimea
- Caulfield South 3162
  - Hopetoun Gardens
- Elsternwick 3185
- Gardenvale 3185
  - Gardenvale West
- Glen Huntly 3163
  - Booran Road
- McKinnon 3204
- Murrumbeena 3163
  - Beauville
- Ormond 3204
  - Ormond East
- St Kilda East 3183 (shared with City of Port Phillip)

=== City of Kingston ===
- Aspendale 3195
- Aspendale Gardens 3195
- Bonbeach 3196
- Braeside 3195
- Carrum 3197
- Chelsea 3196
- Chelsea Heights 3196
- Cheltenham 3192 (Shared with City of Bayside)
  - Cheltenham East
  - Cheltenham North
  - Southland Centre
- Clarinda 3169
- Clayton South 3169
  - Westall (the name of the railway station)
- Dingley Village 3172
  - Dingley
  - Heathen Hill
- Edithvale 3196
- Heatherton 3202
- Highett 3190 (Shared with City of Bayside)
- Mentone 3194
  - Charman
  - Mentone East
- Moorabbin 3189
  - Moorabbin East
  - Wishart
- Moorabbin Airport 3194
- Mordialloc 3195
  - Mordialloc North
- Parkdale 3195
- Patterson Lakes 3197
  - Patterson Gardens
- Waterways 3195

=== City of Monash ===
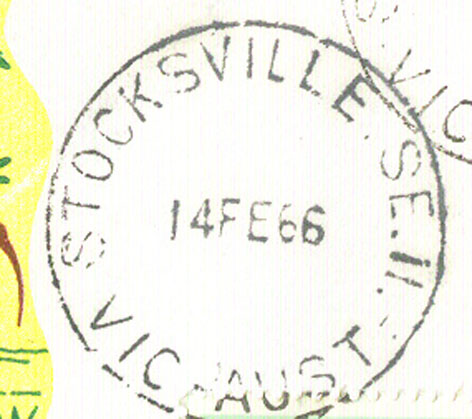
The Stocksville post office was open until 1993. Shown above is a stamp from the Stocksville post office.

- Ashwood 3147
  - Stocksville
- Burwood 3125 (Shared with City of Whitehorse)
- Chadstone 3148
  - Jordanville South
- Clayton 3168
  - Clayton North
  - Petersville
  - Westerfield
  - Whitburn
- Glen Waverley 3150
  - Brentwood
  - Syndal (the name of the railway station)
  - Syndal East
- Hughesdale 3166
- Huntingdale 3166
- Mount Waverley 3149
  - Bayview
  - Highbury View
  - Jordanville (the name of the railway station. Prior to the creation of the Monash Council in the 1990s, this area was previously not a locality, being only the name of the station)
  - Pinewood
- Mulgrave 3170
  - Monashville
  - Mulgrave East
  - Mulgrave North
  - Valewood
  - Waverley Gardens
  - Waverley Park
- Notting Hill 3168
- Oakleigh 3166
- Oakleigh East 3166
- Oakleigh South 3167
  - Moorleigh
- Wheelers Hill 3150
  - Brandon Park (named after the shopping center, Brandon Park Shopping Centre but it's still a shopping centre today)
  - Jells Park

=== Shire of Mornington Peninsula ===
==== Suburbs ====
- Blairgowrie 3942
- Capel Sound 3940
- Dromana 3936
  - Moats Corner
- McCrae 3938
  - Dromana Lighthouse
  - Dromana West
- Mornington 3931
  - Beleura Hill
  - Fishermans Beach
  - Tanti Park
- Mount Eliza 3930
  - Canadian Bay
  - Daveys Bay
  - Kunyung
  - Raneleigh
- Mount Martha 3934
  - Balcombe
  - Maryport
  - Osborne
  - Martha Cove (shared with Safety Beach)
- Portsea 3944
  - Point Nepean
  - Quarantine Station
- Rosebud 3939
  - Peninsular Gardens
  - Rosebud Plaza
  - Rosebud South
- Rye 3941
  - Tyrone
- Safety Beach 3936
  - Martha Cove (shared with Mt Martha)
- Sorrento 3943
  - Koonya
- Tootgarook 3941

==== Townships and rural localities ====
- Arthurs Seat 3936
  - Dromana South
- Balnarring 3926
  - Balnarring North
- Balnarring Beach 3926
- Baxter 3911
- Bittern 3918
- Boneo 3939
- Cape Schanck 3939
- Crib Point 3919
  - Stony Point (the name of the railway station)
- Fingal 3939
  - Gunnamatta
- Flinders 3929
  - Blackberry Corner
- Hastings 3915
  - Old Tyabb
- Main Ridge 3928
- Merricks 3916
- Merricks Beach 3926
- Merricks North 3926
  - Foxeys Hangout
- Moorooduc 3933
- Pearcedale 3912 (shared with City of Casey)
- Point Leo 3916
- Red Hill 3937
- Red Hill South 3937
- Shoreham 3916
- Somers 3927
  - Balnarring East
- Somerville 3912
  - Bembridge
  - "Pearcedale"
- St Andrews Beach 3941
- Tuerong 3915
  - Hastings West
  - Moorooduc South
- Tyabb 3913
  - Tyabb East

==== Naval Base ====
- HMAS Cerberus 3920

=== City of Stonnington ===
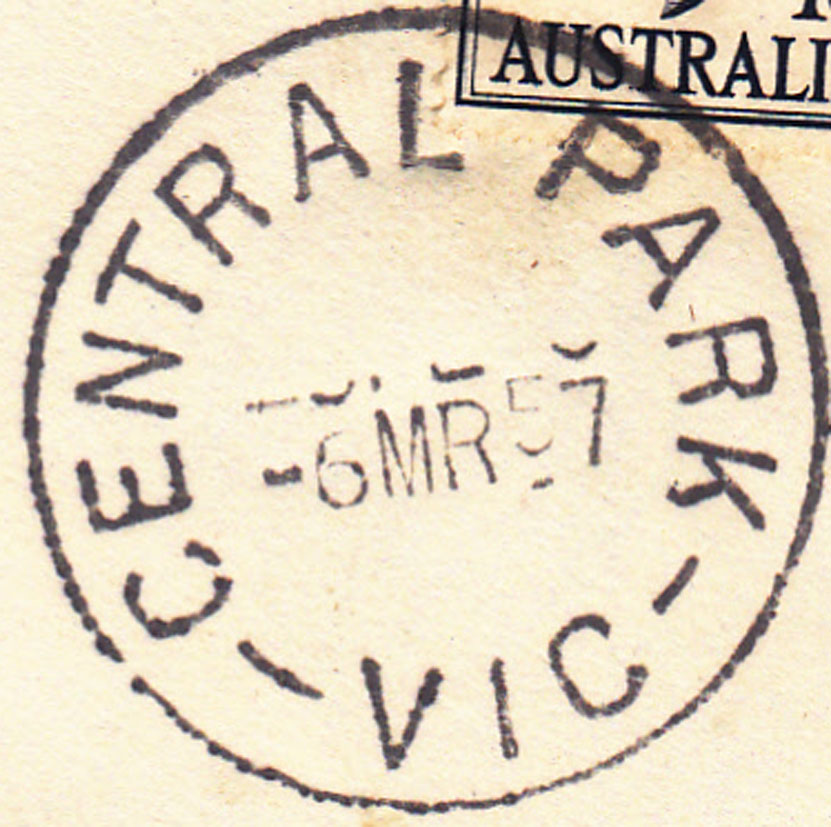
Postmark of Central Park post office in Malvern East

- Armadale 3143
  - Armadale North
- Glen Iris 3146 (Shared with City of Boroondara)
  - Gardiner (the name of the railway station)
- Kooyong 3144
- Malvern (/ˈmɔːlvən/) 3144
  - Malvern North
  - Tooronga (the name of the railway station)
- Malvern East 3145
  - Central Park
  - Darling (the name of the railway station)
  - Darling South
  - Holmesglen (the name of the railway station)
  - Wattletree Road
- Prahran (/pɛ'ræn/) 3181
- South Yarra 3141 (Shared City of Melbourne)
  - Hawksburn (the name of the railway station)
- Toorak 3142
- Windsor 3181

== Western municipalities and their suburbs ==
=== City of Brimbank ===
- Albanvale 3021
- Albion 3020
- Ardeer 3022
- Brooklyn 3012 (Shared with City of Hobsons Bay)
- Cairnlea 3023
- Calder Park 3037
- Deer Park 3023
- Delahey 3037
- Derrimut 3026
- Hillside 3037 (Shared with City of Melton)
- Kealba 3021
- Keilor 3036 (Shared with City of Hume)
  - Brimbank
- Keilor Downs 3038
- Keilor East 3033 (Shared with City of Moonee Valley)
- Keilor Lodge 3038
- Keilor North 3036
  - Sydenham Park
- Keilor Park 3042
- Kings Park 3021
- St Albans 3021
  - St Albans East
  - St Albans South
- Sunshine 3020
- Sunshine North 3020
- Sunshine West 3020
  - Ardeer South
  - Glengala
- Sydenham 3037
- Taylors Lakes 3038
  - Robertson
  - Watergardens (the name of the railway station)
- Tullamarine 3043 (shared with City of Hume and City of Merri-bek)

=== City of Hobsons Bay ===
- Altona 3018
- Altona Meadows 3028
  - Laverton South
- Altona North 3025
  - Altona East
  - Altona Gate
- Brooklyn 3012 (Shared with City of Brimbank)
- Laverton 3028 (Shared with City of Wyndham)
- Newport 3015
- Seabrook 3028
- Seaholme 3018
- South Kingsville 3015
- Spotswood 3015
- Williamstown 3016
  - Williamstown Beach (the name of the railway station)
- Williamstown North 3016

=== City of Maribyrnong ===
- Braybrook 3019
- Footscray 3011
- Kingsville 3012
- Maidstone 3012
- Maribyrnong 3032
- Seddon 3011
- Tottenham 3012
- West Footscray 3012
- Yarraville 3013

=== City of Melton ===
==== Suburbs ====
- Aintree 3336
- Bonnie Brook 3335
- Brookfield 3338
- Burnside 3023
- Burnside Heights 3023
- Caroline Springs 3023
- Cobblebank 3338
- Deanside 3336
- Diggers Rest 3427 (shared with City of Hume)
  - The Gap
- Fieldstone 3024
- Fraser Rise 3336
- Grangefields 3335
- Harkness 3337
- Hillside 3037 (shared with City of Brimbank)
- Kurunjang 3337
- Melton 3337
- Melton South 3338
- Melton West 3337
  - Westmelton
- Plumpton 3335
  - Sydenham West
- Ravenhall 3023
- Rockbank 3335
- Strathtulloh 3338
- Taylors Hill 3037
- Thornhill Park 3335
- Truganina 3029 (shared with City of Wyndham where there is suburban development)
- Weir Views 3338

==== Townships and rural localities ====
- Exford 3338
- Eynesbury 3338 (shared with City of Wyndham)
- Mount Cottrell 3024 (shared with City of Wyndham)
- Parwan 3340 (shared with Shire of Moorabool)
- Toolern Vale 3337 (shared with Shire of Macedon Ranges)

=== City of Moonee Valley ===
- Aberfeldie 3040
- Airport West 3042
- Ascot Vale 3032
  - Ascot Vale West
- Avondale Heights 3034
- Essendon 3040
  - Glenbervie (the name of the railway station)
  - Cross Keys
- Essendon Fields 3041
- Essendon North 3041
- Essendon West 3040
- Flemington 3031 (Shared with City of Melbourne)
  - Newmarket (the name of the railway station)
- Keilor East 3033 (Shared with City of Brimbank)
  - Lincolnville
- Moonee Ponds 3039
- Niddrie 3042
- Strathmore 3041
- Strathmore Heights 3041
- Travancore 3032

=== City of Wyndham ===
==== Suburbs ====
- Hoppers Crossing 3029
  - Laverton West
- Laverton 3028 (Shared with City of Hobsons Bay)
- Laverton North 3026
- Mambourin 3024
- Manor Lakes 3024
- Point Cook 3030
  - Sanctuary Lakes
- Tarneit 3029
- Truganina 3029 (shared with City of Melton)
- Werribee 3030
  - Brophys Crossing
  - Mossfield
- Werribee South 3030
- Williams Landing 3027
  - Williams RAAF
- Wyndham Vale 3024

==== Townships and rural localities ====
- Cocoroc 3030
- Eynesbury 3338 (Shared with City of Melton)
- Little River 3211 (Shared with City of Greater Geelong)
- Mount Cottrell 3024 (Shared with City of Melton)
- Quandong 3340

== See also ==
- Cadastral divisions of Victoria
- Local government areas of Victoria
- List of localities in Victoria
- List of Metro Trains Melbourne railway stations
- List of Melbourne tram routes
- List of bus routes in Melbourne
