= Pakenham South =

- Suburb
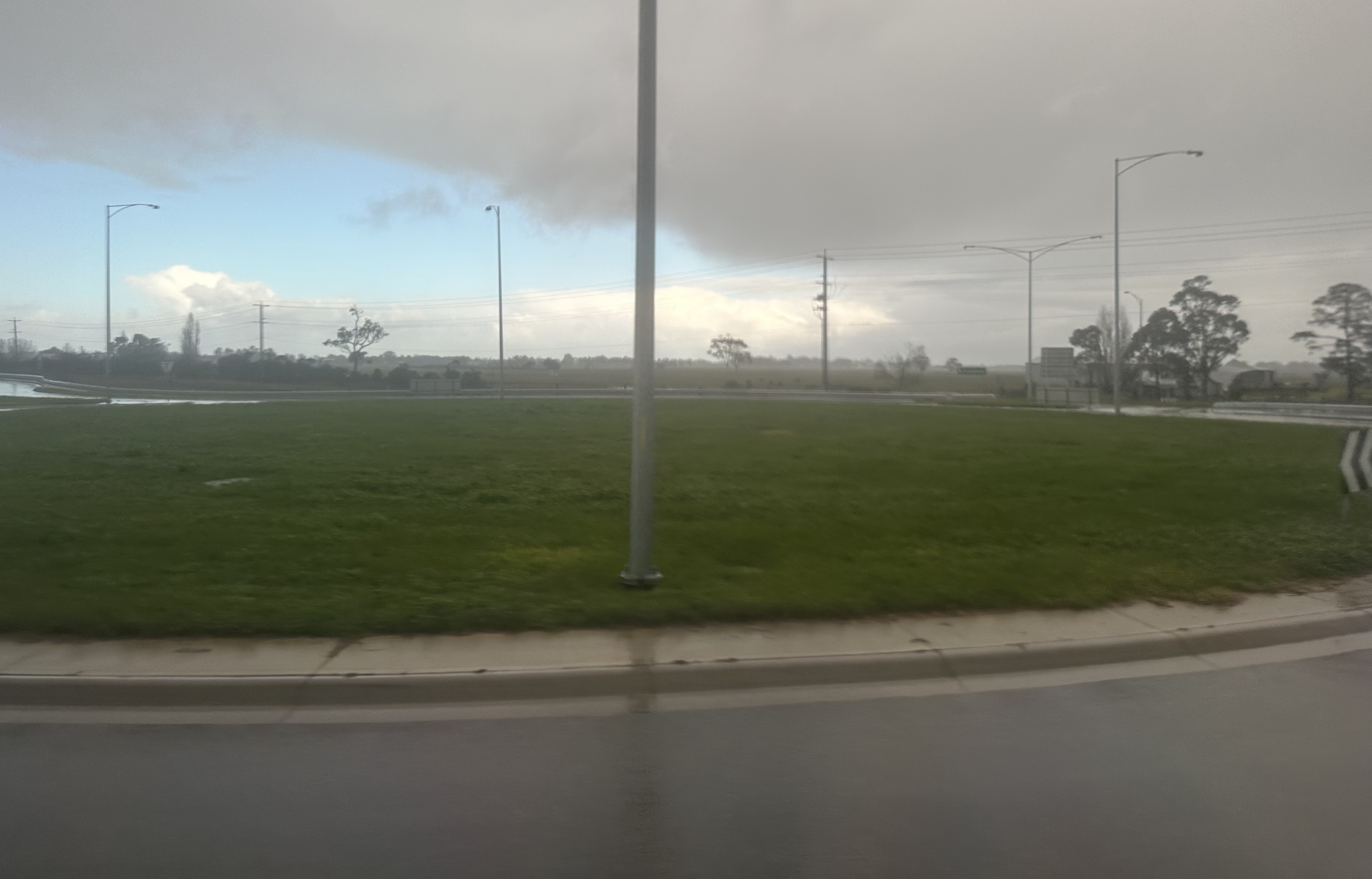
- Pakenham South in July 2026

- Interactive map of Pakenham South
- Coordinates: 38.1315°S 145.5083°E
- Country: Australia
- State: Victoria
- City: Melbourne
- LGA: Shire of Cardinia
- Location: 59 km (37 mi) from Melbourne GPO

Government
  - State electorate: Bass
  - Federal division: La Trobe

Population
  - Total: 229 (2021 census)
- Postcode: 3810
Suburbs around Pakenham South
Officer South	Pakenham	Nar Nar Goon
Cardinia	Pakenham South	Koo Wee Rup North
Rythdale	Koo Wee Rup	Nar Nar Goon North

Pakenham South is a suburb and rural locality in Melbourne, Victoria, Australia, 59 km (37 mi) south-east of Melbourne's Central Business District, located within the Shire of Cardinia local government area. Pakenham South recorded a population of 229 at the 2021 census.

== History ==
Pakenham South is situated in the Kulin nation traditional Aboriginal country. The Boon wurrung people are local custodians within the Kulin nation. The origin of the suburb name is from Sir Edward Pakenham and the geographic position south of the Pakenham main settlement.

== See also ==
- Shire of Pakenham – Pakenham South was previously within this former local government area.
