= County of Mornington =

Coordinates: 38°30′S 145°30′E

Mornington
- Cadastral division
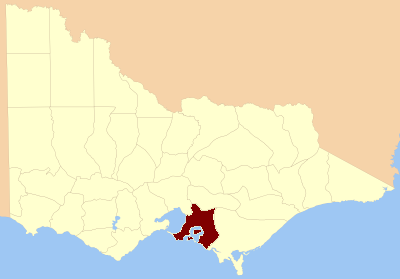
- Location in Victoria
- Country: Australia
- State: Victoria
- Established: 10 January 1849

Area
  - Total: 4,209 km^{2} (1,625 sq mi)
Lands administrative divisions around Mornington
Bourke	Evelyn	Evelyn
Port Phillip	Mornington	Buln Buln
Bass Strait	Bass Strait	Buln Buln

The County of Mornington is one of the 37 counties of Victoria which are part of the cadastral divisions of Australia, used for land titles. It is located to the south-east of Melbourne, including the Mornington Peninsula, French Island and Phillip Island. The county was proclaimed in 1849.

== Parishes ==
Parishes include:

- Balnarring, Victoria
- Berwick, Victoria
- Bittern, Victoria
- Bunyip, Victoria
- Corinella, Victoria
- Cranbourne, Victoria
- Eumemmerring, Victoria
- Fingal, Victoria
- Flinders, Victoria
- Frankston, Victoria
- French Island, Victoria
- Gembrook, Victoria
- Jeetho West, Victoria
- Jeetho, Victoria
- Jumbunna East, Victoria
- Jumbunna, Victoria
- Kangerong, Victoria
- Kongwak, Victoria
- Koo Wee Rup East, Victoria
- Koo Wee Rup, Victoria
- Kurrambee, Victoria
- Lang Lang East, Victoria
- Lang Lang, Victoria
- Langwarrin, Victoria
- Lyndhurst, Victoria
- Moorooduc, Victoria
- Nar Nar Goon, Victoria
- Narre Warren, Victoria
- Nepean, Victoria
- Pakenham, Victoria
- Phillip Island, Victoria
- Ringwood, Victoria
- Scoresby, Victoria
- Sherwood, Victoria
- Tonimbuk East, Victoria
- Tonimbuk, Victoria
- Tyabb, Victoria
- Wannaeue, Victoria
- Wonthaggi North, Victoria
- Wonthaggi, Victoria
- Woolamai, Victoria
- Yallock, Victoria
- Yannathan, Victoria
