= Dewhurst, Victoria =

Coordinates: 37°58′41″S 145°27′50″E

Dewhurst
- Town
- Interactive map of Dewhurst
- Country: Australia
- State: Victoria
- LGA: Shire of Cardinia
- Location: 48 km (30 mi) from Melbourne CBD; 4 km (2.5 mi) from Emerald; 14 km (8.7 mi) from Belgrave

Government
  - State electorate: Pakenham
  - Federal division: La Trobe

Population
  - Total: 151 (2021 census)
- Postcode: 3808
Localities around Dewhurst
Emerald	Emerald	Cockatoo Avonsleigh
Clematis	Dewhurst	Mount Burnett
Guys Hill	Beaconsfield Upper	Pakenham Upper

Dewhurst is a locality in Victoria, Australia, 48 km south-east of Melbourne's Central Business District, located within the Shire of Cardinia local government area. Dewhurst recorded a population of 151 at the 2021 census.

== Nearby attractions ==
It contains part of Cardinia Reservoir. Nearby attractions include Dandenong Ranges, Cardinia Reservoir and Emerald Lake Park. Mount Dandenong is clearly visible from Dewhurst. It has many forests surrounding it and also many picnic areas.

== See also ==
- Shire of Pakenham – Dewhurst was previously within this former local government area.
