= Beaconsfield, Victoria =

Beaconsfield Kemgrim
- Suburb
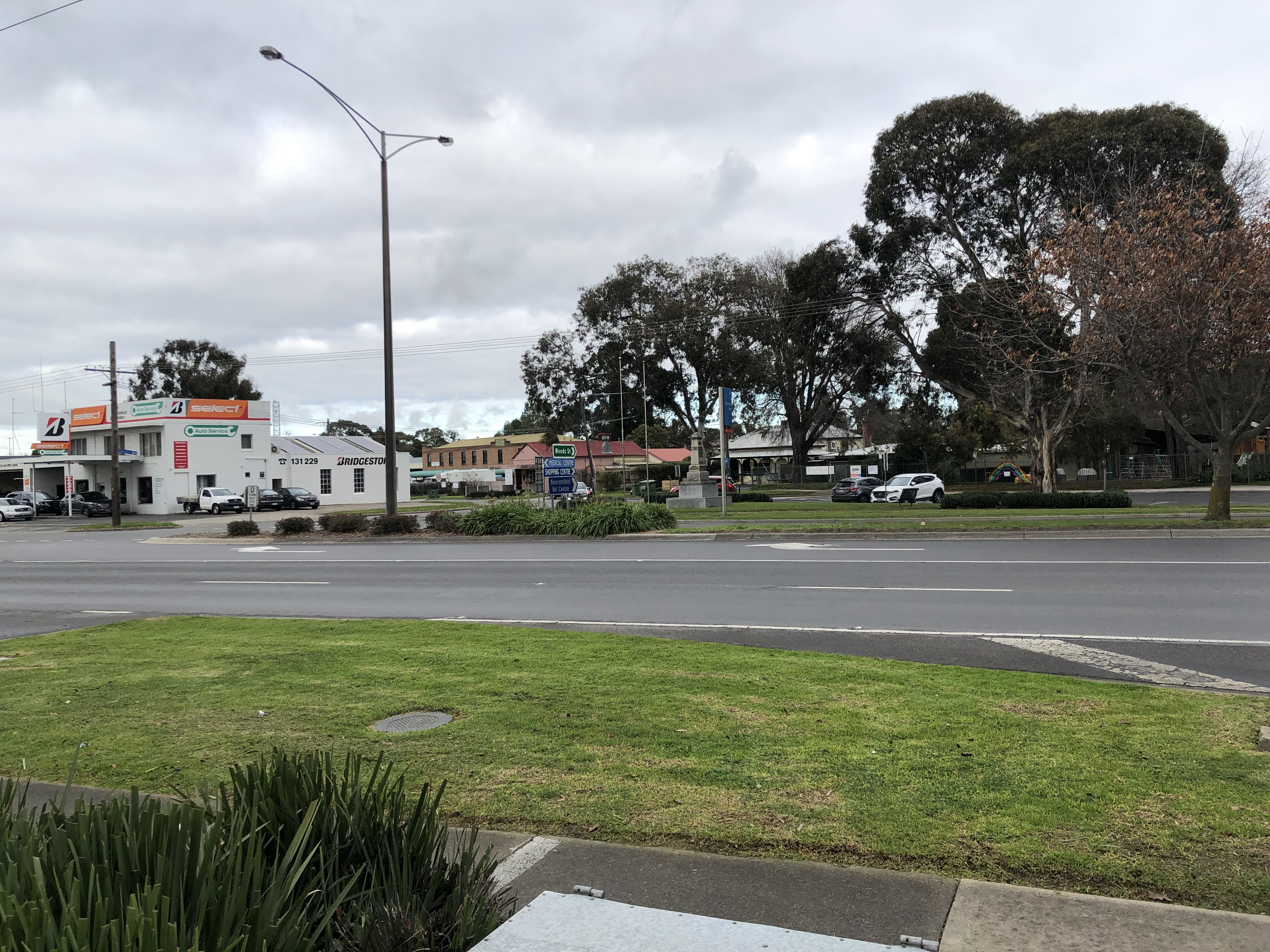
- Old Princes Hwy, Beaconsfield. Facing the war cenotaph and behind it, the (now demolished) Old Post Office (the white weatherboard building).

- Interactive map of Beaconsfield
- Coordinates: 38.049°S 145.371°E
- Country: Australia
- State: Victoria
- City: Melbourne
- LGA: Shire of Cardinia
- Location: 44 km (27 mi) from Melbourne; 7 km (4.3 mi) from Berwick

Government
  - State electorate: Berwick
  - Federal division: La Trobe
- Elevation: 102 m (335 ft)

Population
  - Total: 7,267 (2021 census)
- Postcode: 3807
Suburbs around Beaconsfield
Harkaway	Guys Hill	Officer
Berwick	Beaconsfield	Officer
Berwick	Clyde	Officer South

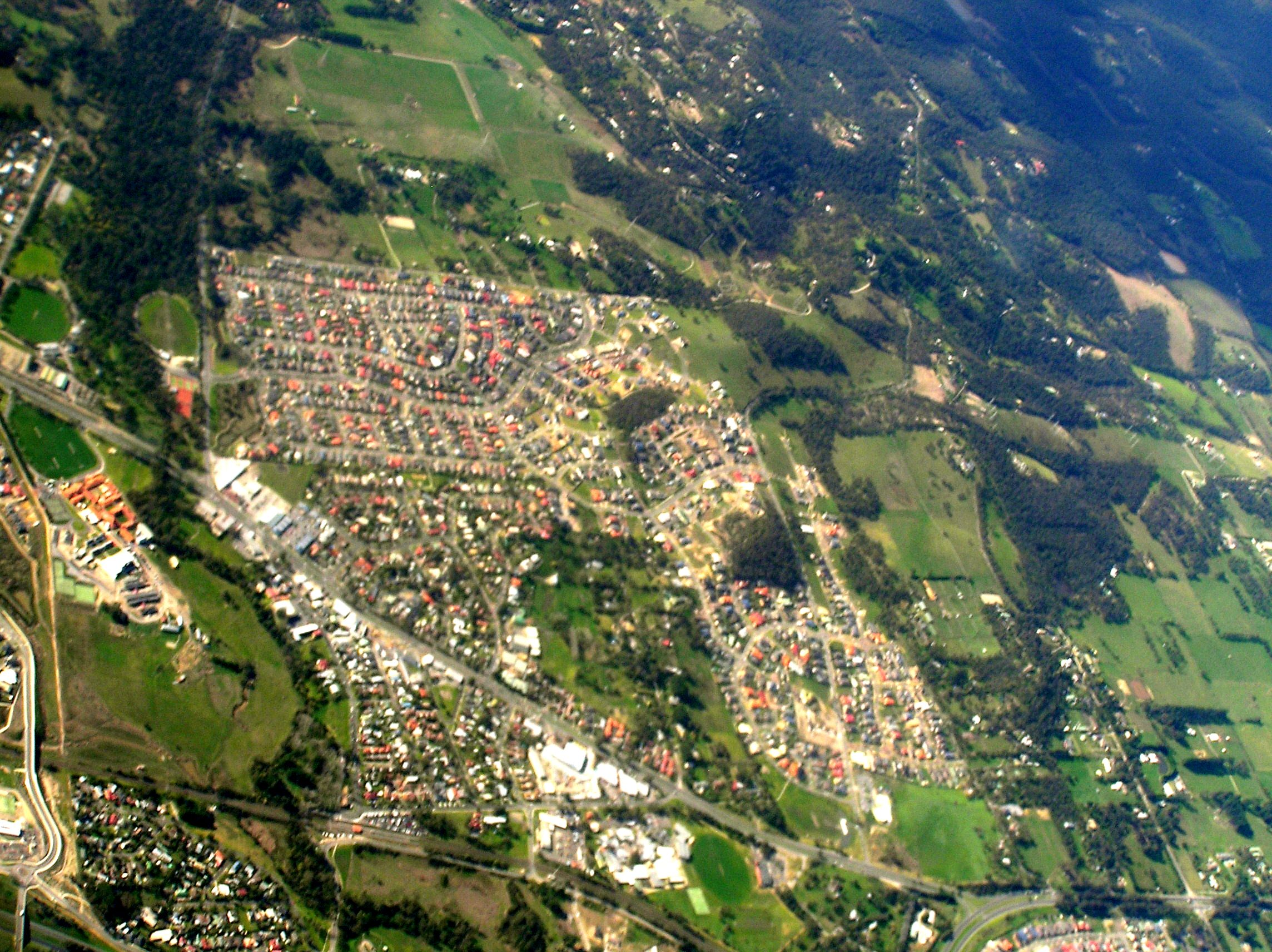
Aerial photo of Beaconsfield

Beaconsfield (Boonwurrung: Kemgrim) is a suburb of Melbourne, Victoria, Australia, 44 km (27 mi) south-east of Melbourne's Central Business District, located within the Shire of Cardinia and City of Casey local government areas. Beaconsfield recorded a population of 7,267 at the 2021 census.

== History ==
Beaconsfield had its roots as a farming settlement on part of the Panty Gurn Gurn Station, which was originally established in 1845. The area was subsequently named Beaconsfield after Benjamin Disraeli (Lord Beaconsfield). David Bowman selected land of approximately 200 acres east of Cardinia Creek and built an inn for travelers, and a settlement grew around the Bowman's Inn, also known as 'Gippsland Hotel' and now the 'Central Hotel'. A railway station opened in 1879, and a Post Office opened 1889 on Woods Street. It became the Beaconsfield Post Office in 1916 and was used for many years as a café, but was demolished in late October 2021. The earlier Beaconsfield Railway Station Post Office opened on 1 January 1883.

In 1891 an area to north of Beaconsfield was renamed Beaconsfield Upper and in around 1902 the Railway Station was renamed to "Beaconsfield".

== Facilities ==
Shopping centres include "Beaconsfield Shopping Plaza" with shops including Aldi, Woolworths, bakeries, a post office, chemist, cafés and takeaway food shops, and the nearby "Beaconsfield Hub".

Schools include Beaconsfield Primary, and St Francis Xavier College (Beaconsfield Campus). There are many cafés, restaurants and hairdressers around the commercial shopping area. The Beaconsfield CFA (Country Fire Authority) has their fire station in Woods Street.

The Akoonah Park Market is held every Sunday, and is very popular with local Berwick and Beaconsfield shoppers.

== Historical Places of Interest ==
War cenotaph located on the corner of Woods Street and Old Princes Highway. It was unveiled in 1920.

Railway house built in 1888, near Beaconsfield Train Station. The large bunya bunya pine to the front of the property is listed as a significant tree.

Shipwatcher's lookout is marked by a large granite rock and plaque, on the side of Cooinda Road.

== Parks ==
Beaconsfield Flora and Fauna Reserve on the Beaconsfield Emerald Road.

Beaconsfield Park located on the corner of Beaconsfield Emerald Road and the Old Princes Highway.

Berwick Views Wetlands beside Beaconsfield Emerald Road and Fieldstone Boulevard

Bob Burgess Reserve on Old Princes Highway, and is opposite Beaconsfield Park.

Jim Parkes Reserve on the corner of Souter and Horner Street.

Kath Roberts Reserve on Kathleen Court.

== Sports clubs ==
The suburb has an Australian Rules football club and a netball club that compete in the Eastern Football Netball League.

There is also a cricket club and a tennis club.

== Notable people ==
- Vanessa Amorosi – professional singer who had several Top 40 chart hits.
- Len Maddocks – former Australian cricketer.
- Brendan Fevola – Australian rules footballer.
- Austinn Jones – Australian rules footballer.
- Chris Newman - Australian rules footballer.

== See also ==
- City of Berwick – Parts of Beaconsfield were previously within this former local government area.
- Shire of Pakenham – Parts of Beaconsfield were previously within this former local government area.
- Beaconsfield railway station
