= Cardinia Motor Recreation and Education Park =

Australian planned motorsport and driver education facility

- Location: Pakenham, Victoria
- Coordinates: 38.103°S 145.461°E
- FIA Grade: 2 (proposed)
- Owner: Set to open to tender process
- Construction cost: A$200m
- Architect: Apex Circuit Design
- Website: www.facebook.com/cardiniamotorsports/
- Length: 3.6 km

The Cardinia Motor Recreation and Education Park is a planned motorsport and driver education facility at Pakenham, an outer southeastern suburb of Melbourne, Victoria, Australia. It was proposed to have a 3.6 kilometres (2.2 mi) race track built to FIA Grade 2 standard, along with other facilities. It received approval from the Cardinia Shire Council in December 2019 and was expected to start construction within six months. The site was previously the home of both the Koo Wee Rup Motor Cycle Club and the Pakenham Auto Club. The proposal had been in planning since 2013, with a view to reducing hoon driving in the area.

Other facilities in the complex are proposed to include a skid pan, go-kart track and clay pigeon shooting range. Earlier plans also included a dragstrip. It is also expected to have a hotel with views over the circuit.
