= Clyde North =

- Suburb
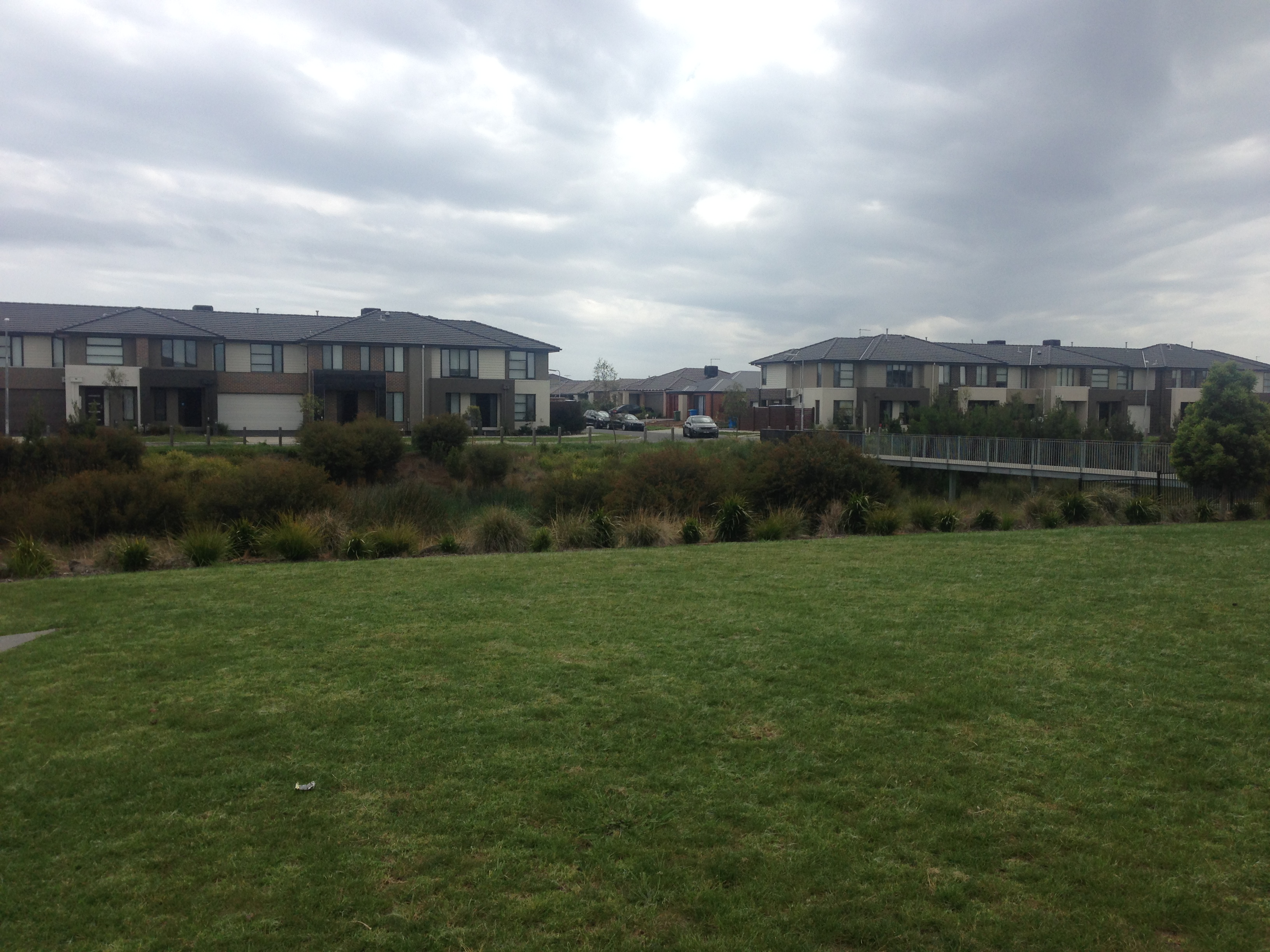
- Houses in Clyde North

- Interactive map of Clyde North
- Coordinates: 38°07′S 145°20′E
- Country: Australia
- State: Victoria
- City: Melbourne
- LGA: City of Casey
- Location: 47 km (29 mi) from Melbourne

Government
  - State electorates: Berwick; Cranbourne
  - Federal divisions: La Trobe; Holt

Area
  - Total: 29.2 km^{2} (11.3 sq mi)

Population
  - Total: 31,681 (2021 census)
  - Density: 1,085.0/km^{2} (2,810/sq mi)
- Postcode: 3978
Suburbs around Clyde North
Narre Warren South	Berwick	Officer
Cranbourne North	Clyde North	Officer South
Cranbourne East	Clyde	Cardinia

Clyde North is a suburb in Melbourne, Victoria, Australia, 46 km south-east of the central business district, located within the City of Casey local government area. Clyde North recorded a population of 31,681 at the 2021 census.

== History ==
It was named after the Clyde Creek, a watercourse between two early pastoral runs. The stream flowed eastwards to the Koo Wee Rup Swamp about six kilometres away. It is thought that the name was inspired by the River Clyde, in Scotland.

Clyde Post Office opened on 25 January 1864. In 1915, it was renamed Clyde North, when Clyde Railway Station office was renamed Clyde.

== Today ==
The area to the west of Berwick-Cranbourne Road is mostly within the Urban Growth Boundary, with a residential development known as "Cascades On Clyde" and several others, under construction, having begun in late 2007.

Parks Victoria are also investigating the creation of a new regional park, on land bounded by Berwick-Cranbourne and Thompson Roads.

The area of Clyde North to the east of the newly built suburban area, roughly one kilometre east of Berwick-Cranbourne Road, is classed as green wedge land, is distinctly rural in nature, and is outside of the main growth corridor. The land is used in this area for a mixture of market gardening (notably around Pattersons Road) and dairy farming. The land is mainly flat, and most of the roads in the area are dirt roads maintained by the City of Casey.

A new lifestyle centre was recently opened in late 2019, with a Bunnings warehouse as the first store, followed by a few others, and now contains an Aldi supermarket.

== Education ==
=== Public schools ===
The public schools located in Clyde North are Grayling Primary School, Ramlegh Park Primary School, Topirum Primary School, Wilandra Rise Primary School, as well as the upcoming Clyde North Secondary School (interim name) opening in 2025 for Year 7 students and Thompsons West Primary School (interim name) opening in 2025. The Victorian Government is currently building new public primary and secondary schools, as options (especially for secondary education) are currently scarce for Clyde North residents.

=== Private schools ===
The Catholic and independent schools located in Clyde North are Hillcrest Christian College, Rivercrest Christian College, St Peter's College, and Clyde Grammar (open to Prep to Year 2 students). Some families transport their children to private schools in neighbouring suburbs as well, such as Berwick.

== Transport ==
=== Road ===
Berwick-Cranbourne Road (which continues on to be known as Clyde Road in the suburb of Berwick) is the major arterial road for the suburb of Clyde North. Other major roads include Soldiers Road, which serves the Berwick Waters estate, Thompson Road, which is the major east-west road for the suburb, Pattersons Road, which is a major east-west road for the southern edge of the suburb, and Bells Road, which serves the developing St Germain estate. Bells Road and Soldiers Road are not to be confused with their counterparts in Berwick, where they do not connect to the roads of the same name. Clyde North is a very car-dependent suburb, even when compared to its neighbouring suburbs.

=== Cycling ===
There are very few cycling paths in Clyde North. The few notable paths are on MacKillop Way, Thoroughbred Drive, and the pedestrian pathway alongside Heather Grove.

=== Public transport ===
Clyde North’s public transport is reliant on a number of public bus routes operated by Cranbourne Transit and Ventura Bus Lines that take passengers to shopping centres, railway stations, and schools.

The route 798 bus goes from the Cranbourne railway station to the Selandra Rise housing estate via the Cranbourne High Street, Narre Warren-Cranbourne Road, Linsell Boulevard, and Selandra Boulevard before terminating at Heather Grove. The route follows a 20 to 25 minute frequency on weekdays and 20 to 30 minute frequencies on weekends.

The route 881 bus goes from the bus stop adjacent to the Merinda Park railway station to the St Germain estate via Thompson Road and St Germain Boulevard. The bus route has 40 minute frequencies.

The route 888 bus goes from the Berwick railway station down Clyde Road and Berwick-Cranbourne Road and finishes at the boundary between Clyde North and Clyde. The route largely follows a one hour frequency.

The route 889 bus goes from the Berwick railway station to the end of Skylark Boulevard (near Grayling Primary School and Rivercrest Christian College) via Clyde Road, Grices Road, Soldiers Road, and Skylark Boulevard. The route has frequencies of approximately 40 minutes.

The route 897 bus goes from the Orana estate to Lynbrook station via Pattersons Road, the Cranbourne High street, Cranbourne railway station, and the suburbs of Cranbourne West and Lyndhurst. The route has 20 minute frequencies on weekdays and 20 to 30 frequencies on weekends.

The route 898 bus goes from the Cranbourne railway station via the high street of Cranbourne, Cameron Street, Bradford Drive before finally terminating at the end of Heather Grove. The route has 20 minute frequencies during weekdays and 40 to 60 minute frequencies during the weekend.

The route 899 bus goes from Berwick station to The Avenue Village Shopping Centre via Clyde Road, Arbourlea Boulevard, Wheelers Park Drive, Alisma Boulevard, Mountainview Boulevard, William Thwaites Boulevard, Linden Tree Way and Bibury Street. The route has frequencies of around 35 to 45 minutes.

== Estates ==
Clyde North has since expanded and has many new estates. Selandra Rise which borders Cranbourne East has now been sold out and also now has a local shopping centre within the estate. Since the completion there have been a number of estates commence within the Clyde North area which have been listed below:

- Aspen on Clyde
- Berwick Waters
- Circa
- Highgrove
- Clydevale
- Thompsons Run
- The Boulevard
- Bloom
- Ramlegh Springs
- Meridian
- St Germain
- Delaray
- Northside
- Somerford

== See also ==
- City of Cranbourne – Clyde North was previously within this former local government area.
