= Pakenham Upper =

- Town
- Interactive map of Pakenham Upper
- Coordinates: 38.0059°S 145.5126°E
- Country: Australia
- State: Victoria
- City: Melbourne
- LGA: Shire of Cardinia
- Location: 53 km (33 mi) from Melbourne GPO

Government
  - State electorate: Pakenham
  - Federal division: La Trobe

Population
  - Total: 1,196 (2021 census)
- Postcode: 3810
Localities around Pakenham Upper
Dewhurst	Mount Burnett	Gembrook
Beaconsfield Upper	Pakenham Upper	Nar Nar Goon North
Pakenham	Pakenham	Nar Nar Goon North

Pakenham Upper is a locality in Melbourne, Victoria, Australia, 53 km (33 mi) south-east of Melbourne's Central Business District, located within the Shire of Cardinia local government area. Pakenham Upper recorded a population of 1,196 at the 2021 census.

== History ==
Pakenham Upper is situated in the Kulin nation traditional Aboriginal country. The Boon Wurrung people are local custodians within the Kulin nation. The origin of the suburb name is from Sir Edward Pakenham and the geographic position north of the Pakenham main settlement.

Originally known as Gembrook South, the settlement of Pakenham Upper is dated from 1872. The Gembrook South post office was established in 1882 and was renamed as the Pakenham Upper post office in 1913.

== Amenities ==
- Pakenham Upper Community Hall
- Pakenham Upper Riding Club
- Pakenham Upper Toomuc Cricket Club

== See also ==
- Shire of Pakenham – Pakenham Upper was previously within this former local government area.
