= Shire of Pakenham =

Coordinates: 38°05′S 145°29′E

- Local government area
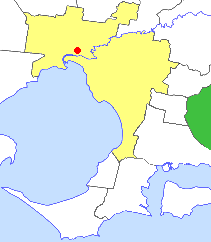
- Location in Melbourne

- The Shire of Pakenham as at its dissolution in 1994
- Country: Australia
- State: Victoria
- Region: Southeast Melbourne; West Gippsland
- Established: 1862
- Council seat: Pakenham

Area
  - Total: 874 km^{2} (337 sq mi)

Population
  - Total: 29,500 (1992)
  - Density: 33.75/km^{2} (87.42/sq mi)
- County: Mornington, Evelyn
LGAs around Shire of Pakenham
Sherbrooke	Sherbrooke	Upper Yarra
Berwick	Shire of Pakenham	Buln Buln
Cranbourne	Korumburra	Korumburra

The Shire of Pakenham was a local government area about 60 kilometres (37 mi) southeast of Melbourne, the state capital of Victoria, Australia. The shire covered an area of 874 square kilometres (337.5 sq mi), and existed from 1862 until 1994.

== History ==
The Berwick Road District was incorporated on 24 October 1862, and became a shire on 12 May 1868. At the time, it was a considerably larger area, extending well into what is now Melbourne's eastern and southeastern suburbs, including today's City of Knox, as well as areas east of Dandenong and the Dandenong Ranges.

On 23 May 1889, the Scoresby Riding was severed and incorporated as the Shire of Fern Tree Gully. Fern Tree Gully in turn was splintered in 1964, to form the City of Knox and the Shire of Sherbrooke.

In 1902, the Berwick Shire headquarters moved to Pakenham. The shire was generally rural in character, with fruit growing, dairying and sheep and cattle grazing being the main pursuits. However, from the 1950s onward, the western part, around Berwick and Narre Warren, experienced major residential growth as well as industrial development. On 1 October 1973, the western part split from the shire and was immediately proclaimed as the City of Berwick. The remaining rural area was renamed the Shire of Pakenham on 1 September 1974.

On 15 December 1994, the Shire of Pakenham was abolished, and along with parts of the City of Cranbourne (Koo Wee Rup and Lang Lang) and the Shire of Sherbrooke (around Emerald and Cockatoo), was merged into the newly created Shire of Cardinia.

Council met at the Shire Offices, in Duncan Drive, Pakenham. The facility was later the headquarters for the Shire of Cardinia until 2014.

== Wards ==
The Shire of Pakenham was divided into four ridings on 1 April 1988, each of which elected three councillors:

- Beacon Hills Ward
- Iona Ward
- Ranges Ward
- Toomuc Ward

== Suburbs and localities ==
Outer Metropolitan:

- Beaconsfield (shared with the City of Berwick)
- Beaconsfield Upper
- Cockatoo
- Emerald (shared with the Shire of Sherbrooke)
- Gembrook
- Officer
- Pakenham*
- Pakenham South
- Pakenham Upper

* Council seat.

Rural:

- Bunyip
- Bunyip North
- Cora Lynn
- Dewhurst
- Garfield
- Iona
- Maryknoll
- Nar Nar Goon
- Nar Nar Goon North
- Tonimbuk
- Tynong
- Vervale

== Population ==
Year	Population
1954	12,412
1958	16,580*
1961	21,699
1966	28,751
1971	33,110+
1976	14,932
1981	17,876
1986	22,648
1991	27,619

* Estimate in the 1958 Victorian Year Book.
+ Includes 20,474 from Berwick district and 12,636 from Pakenham district.
