= Officer, Victoria =

Suburb of Melbourne, Australia

Officer
- Suburb
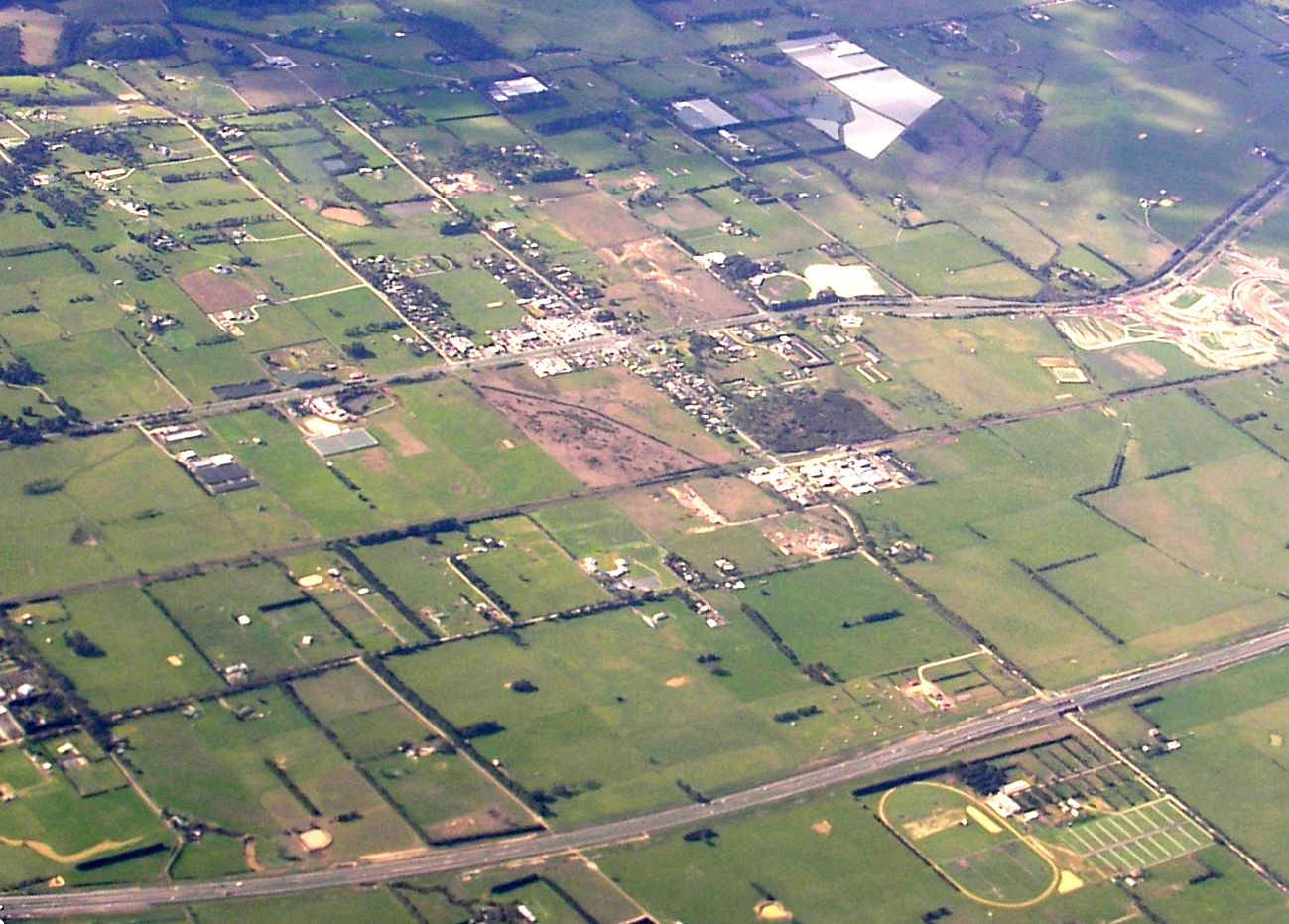
- Aerial view from the south-west

- Interactive map of Officer
- Coordinates: 38°03′29″S 145°24′32″E
- Country: Australia
- State: Victoria
- City: Melbourne
- LGA: Shire of Cardinia
- Location: 48 km (30 mi) from Melbourne; 8 km (5.0 mi) from Berwick

Government
  - State electorate: Pakenham
  - Federal division: La Trobe
- Elevation: 127 m (417 ft)

Population
  - Total: 18,503 (2021 census)
- Postcode: 3809
Suburbs around Officer
Guys Hill	Beaconsfield Upper	Beaconsfield Upper
Beaconsfield	Officer	Pakenham
Clyde North	Officer South	Officer South

Officer is a suburb of Melbourne, Victoria, Australia, 48 km south-east of Melbourne's Central Business District and the second most populous in the Shire of Cardinia after Pakenham. Officer recorded a population of 18,503 at the 2021 census.

Officer serves as the Council seat of the shire.

Most of the land around Officer is currently being developed for residential use with medium density housing. Population and demographic mixes are changing, with construction of a 4,000 lot housing estate to be completed in late 2019. Current estates that have been announced and under construction include: Timbertop, Arcadia, Kaduna Park, Savannah, Officer Fields and Officer Central.

== History ==
Officer is situated in the Kulin nation traditional Aboriginal country. The Boon Wurrung people are local custodians within the Kulin nation.

The suburb is named after the Officer family, who were early white settlers in the area. A timber industry was established, and by 1870 timber was being transported from the railways sidings, named Officer's Wood Siding. This was shortened to Officer's and later, Officer.

A brickmaking industry began in the 1880s, but died away after the collapse of the land boom. The population was sufficient to justify a post office, opening on 16 December 1885 (known as Officer's Siding until 1888 and Officer Railway Station until 1913).

On 17 November 2014, the Shire of Cardinia moved from its offices in Pakenham to a new building in Officer, making it the Council seat. The council building is within the planned Officer Town Centre, expected to house new retail and recreational facilities.

== Demographics ==
In Officer 70.1% of people were born in Australia. The most common ancestries in Officer were English 25.7%, Australian 24.6%, Irish 6.7%, Scottish 5.9% and Indian 4.0%. The most common countries of birth outside of Australia were England 4.3%, India 4.3%, Sri Lanka 2.9%, New Zealand 1.8% and Philippines 1.0%. 0.6% of people in Pakenham are Aboriginal. The most common responses for religion in Officer (State Suburbs) were No Religion, so described 32.9%, Catholic 24.5%, Anglican 9.4%, Not stated 6.3% and Christian, nfd 4.5%. In Officer (State Suburbs), Christianity was the largest religious group reported overall 53.2%.

== Education ==
Officer is in the south east growth corridor, with many new schools opening in the past ten years. There are now fifteen schools in the area; Berwick Grammar School, Glenvale School, Heritage College, Maranatha Christian School (Officer campus), Minaret Islamic College (Officer campus), Officer Secondary College, Officer Specialist School, St Brigid's Catholic Primary School, St Clare's Catholic Primary School, St. Francis Xavier College (Officer Campus), Bridgewood Primary School, Kurmile Primary School, Kurrun Primary School, Officer Primary School and Orchard Park Primary School are located in Officer.

== Facilities ==
=== Recreation ===
There are various facilities in officer for recreation. There are two lighted AFL sporting grounds which also support Cricket. There are presently 5 recreational parks for walking and children's playgrounds. Dragon Park was voted Victoria's Favourite Playground in 2021.

Currently under construction as of May 2021 is Comely Banks Recreation Reserve. Comely Banks Recreation Reserve is being built next to Bridgewood Primary School, at 125 Bridge Road, Officer. The regional sporting hub will feature 4 rectangular pitches for rugby, a pavilion, 2 cricket wickets with provisions for AFL, cricket practice nets, playground and open spaces. More information can be found on the Cardinia Shire website.

=== Sport ===
Officer is home to the Officer Football Club (Rythdale, Officer, Cardinia), which competes in the Outer East Football Netball League. They last won the premiership in 2002.

=== Retail ===
Currently the major shopping precinct is Arena Shopping Centre. It has a mix of major retail and some smaller commercial outlets including the Officer Post Office, supermarket and restaurants. As a newly developed area Officer also has access to the Australian NBN service which has much larger capability for increased network performances.

=== Transport ===
Officer railway station is located on the Pakenham line in Victoria, Australia. It serves the south-eastern Melbourne suburb of Officer, and opened on 4 August 1881. The 928 and 926 bus routes also go through Officer.

== Notable residents ==
- AFL player Greg Tivendale (Number 32 for Richmond) grew up in Officer.

== See also ==
- Shire of Pakenham – Officer was previously within this former local government area.
- Officer railway station
- Officer Development Plan (PDF)
