= Koo Wee Rup =

Coordinates: 38°11′53″S 145°29′20″E

- Town
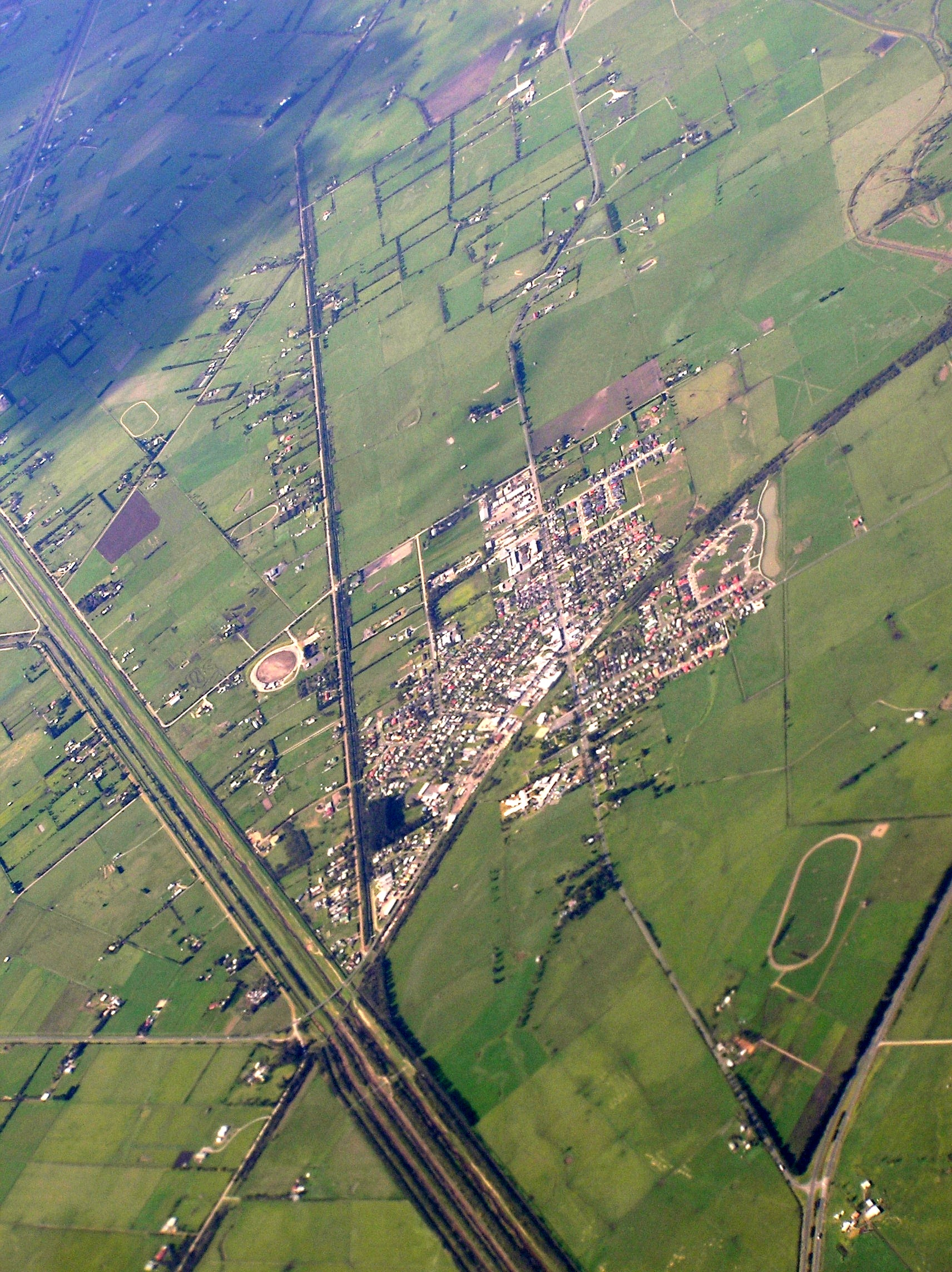
- Aerial photo from the south-west, 2008
- Interactive map of Koo Wee Rup
- Country: Australia
- State: Victoria
- LGA: Shire of Cardinia
- Location: 69 km (43 mi) from Melbourne; 25 km (16 mi) from Cranbourne

Government
  - State electorate: Bass
  - Federal division: La Trobe

Area
  - Total: 57.6 km^{2} (22.2 sq mi)
- Elevation: 36 m (118 ft)

Population
  - Total: 4,047 (2021 census)
  - Density: 70.26/km^{2} (181.97/sq mi)
- Postcode: 3981
Localities around Koo Wee Rup
Rythdale	Pakenham South	Koo Wee Rup North
Dalmore	Koo Wee Rup	Bayles
Tooradin	Western Port	Monomeith; Caldermeade

Koo Wee Rup (/ˌkuː ˌwiː ˈrʌp/) is a town in Victoria, Australia, 63 km south-east of Melbourne's central business district and located within the Shire of Cardinia local government area. Koo-Wee-Rup is an aboriginal word for "blackfish swimming". Originally marshland, the Koo-Wee-Rup Swamp (Note: The official name of the swamp is spelled using hyphens, viz., "Koo-Wee-Rup". However, the official name for the town (and associated structures) is spelled without hyphens, viz., "Koo Wee Rup" or sometimes incorrectly as "Kooweerup".) area was transformed, over ninety years, into productive market gardens. According to the 2021 census, Koo Wee Rup had a population of 4,047.

Koo Wee Rup is Australia's largest growing district and is also known for beef farming and potato cultivation. The town previously hosted an annual potato festival each March to raise funds for the Westernport Memorial Hospital, now known as Kooweerup Regional Health Service.

Local educational institutions include Koo Wee Rup Primary School, St John the Baptist Primary School, and Koo Wee Rup Secondary College. The town also has an Australian rules football team competing in the West Gippsland Football League.

== History ==
Before December 1994, the suburb was part of the Shire of Cranbourne. The local post office commenced operations on 7 January 1891. In the early 1950s, the town saw an influx of Dutch and Italian families. Prior to European settlement, the Bunurong Aboriginal people inhabited the region. The town's name is derived from their language, with "Ku-wirup" believed to mean "plenty of blackfish" or "blackfish swimming".

A lesser-known historical fact about Koo Wee Rup is that in 1921–1922, the Amalgamated Wireless Limited company established an experimental radio receiving station in the area. This facility was capable of receiving transmissions directly from Europe without the need for relay stations in other countries, marking a significant advancement in international communication.

=== Heritage listing ===
The following place in Koo Wee Rup is listed on the Victorian Heritage Register:

- Harewood, a homestead, 3300 South Gippsland Highway, midway between Koo Wee Rup and Tooradin

== Transport ==
=== Railway ===
Koo Wee Rup railway station was formerly situated on the South Gippsland railway line that operated as far as a terminus at Yarram in the 1970s, and was cut back to Leongatha in the early 1980s. A V/Line road coach service replaced the rail passenger service to Leongatha on 24 July 1993, running between Melbourne and Yarram. However, since the closure of the South Gippsland rail line by the Kennett state government on 14 December 1994, the South and West Gippsland Transport Group, represented by the local council, have campaigned for the rail service to be reinstated beyond its current terminus at Cranbourne by the 2020s, which had been promised by the Bracks government on its election in 1999.

=== Busses ===
Ventura Bus Lines operates a bus service from Koo Wee Rup to Pakenham on behalf of Public Transport Victoria.

=== Proposed airport ===
In 2017, Koo Wee Rup was announced as the proposed site for a third Melbourne airport. The Shire of Cardinia claimed it has been kept in the dark about an investment company's plan to build a $7 billion south-east airport; however, they urged the state government to find a location for an airport in the area.

== Sport and recreation ==
Some sports facilities in the area include Koo Wee Rup Football Club competing at Koo Wee Rup Recreation Reserve in the West Gippsland Football Netball Competition, Koo Wee Rup Netball Club, Koo Wee Rup Bowls Club and Koo Wee Rup Tennis Club.

== See also ==
- City of Cranbourne – Koo Wee Rup was previously within this former local government area.
