= Catani =

- Town
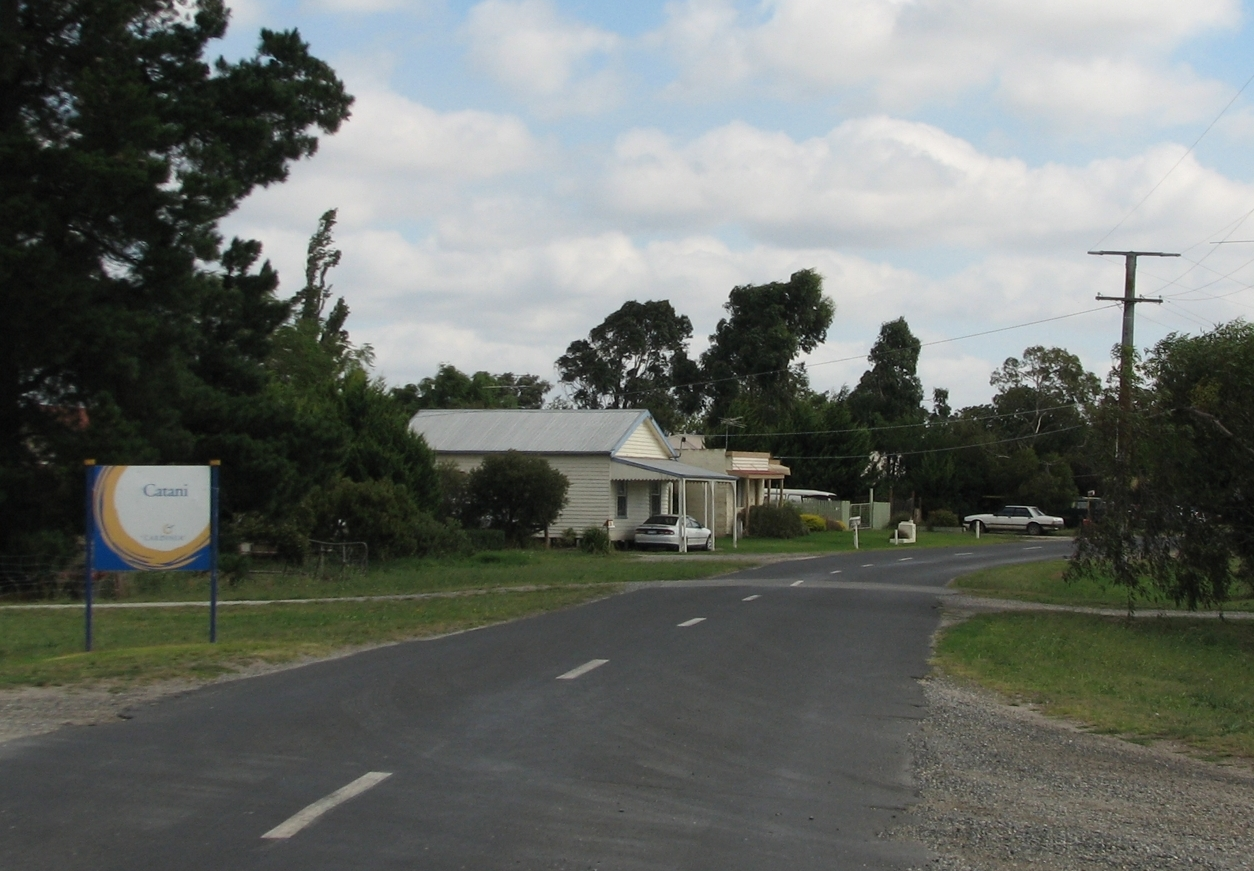
- Taplins Road

- Interactive map of Catani
- Coordinates: 38°11′S 145°39′E
- Country: Australia
- State: Victoria
- LGA: Shire of Cardinia
- Location: 72 km (45 mi) from Melbourne

Government
  - State electorate: Bass
  - Federal division: Monash

Population
  - Total: 297 (2021 census)
- Postcode: 3981

Catani is a locality in the Shire of Cardinia, Victoria, Australia, 72 kilometres (45 mi) south-east of Melbourne's Central Business District. Catani recorded a population of 297 at the 2021 census.

== History ==
The town was named after Carlo Catani, a civil engineer who worked on the draining of the Koo-Wee-Rup Swamp.

Catani Post Office opened on 2 April 1923 and closed in 1981 after Bernadette Miles left.

== Today ==
Catani has an Australian Rules football team playing in the Ellinbank & District Football League. Catani is also host to the Gippsland Pleasure Harness Society, a branch of the Australian Carriage Driving Society. Members of the club meet at the Recreational Reserve on the third Sunday of each month to practice and participate in activities with their horses, ponies and donkeys. The town also has netball, cricket and tennis teams running during their season. A school bus that runs throughout the town twice a day for students at Kooweerup Secondary college.

== See also ==
- City of Cranbourne – Catani was previously within this former local government area.
