= Beaconsfield Upper =

- Town
- Interactive map of Beaconsfield Upper
- Coordinates: 37.996°S 145.415°E
- Country: Australia
- State: Victoria
- LGA: Shire of Cardinia
- Location: 45 km (28 mi) from Melbourne; 10 km (6.2 mi) from Berwick

Government
  - State electorates: Berwick; Pakenham
  - Federal division: La Trobe
- Elevation: 157 m (515 ft)

Population
  - Total: 2,997 (2021 census)
- Postcode: 3808
Localities around Beaconsfield Upper
Narre Warren East	Emerald	Dewhurst
Harkaway	Beaconsfield Upper	Pakenham Upper
Guys Hill	Officer	Pakenham

Beaconsfield Upper is a town in Victoria, Australia, 45 km south-east of Melbourne's Central Business District, located within the Shire of Cardinia local government area. Beaconsfield Upper recorded a population of 2,997 at the 2021 census.

== History ==
Squatters grazed sheep and cattle in Berwick Shire from the 1830s but there was little interest in the difficult terrain and poor soils in the hills. The discovery of gold in 1872 led to the application of Section 49 of the Land Act to the area, which provided attractive terms to small selectors. An early pioneer, William Brisbane, named his guesthouse "Beaconsfield House" after the then British Prime Minister Benjamin Disraeli (Lord Beaconsfield). When "Beaconsfield" Post Office opened on 7 October 1878, Brisbane was the first postmaster.

The Melbourne to Sale Railway line opened in 1879 and later that year, a platform built at the Cardinia Creek crossing was named Beaconsfield. The Beaconsfield Post office was renamed Beaconsfield Upper in 1891. Early settlers tended to be small mixed farmers or Melbournites with weekenders. By 1912, there was a school, a hall, a general store and post office plus six guesthouses and the Pinegrove Hotel. In February 1983, the Ash Wednesday fires swept through the area destroying many houses and claiming lives.

== Today ==
The town can be referred to colloquially as Upper Beac and Upper Beacy. A community newsletter, the Village Bell, is published quarterly by the Upper Beaconsfield Association. Sport and leisure facilities include a busy community centre, recreation reserve for cricket, football and scouting groups, a pony and riding club, tennis club and a number of parks and reserves. Golfers play at the Beaconhills Country Club on Stoney Creek Road. Community organisations include 3 and 4 year old kindergartens, primary school, St John's Anglican church, hall and meeting room, a nursing home, Country Fire Authority, and a men's shed. The community centre provides crèche, maternal and child health, internet access and a variety of classes and courses. A mobile library visits weekly.

== See also ==
- Shire of Pakenham – Beaconsfield Upper was previously within this former local government area.
