= Shire of Cardinia =

Coordinates: 38°05′S 145°35′E

Cardinia Shire
- Local government area
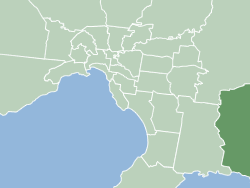

- Interactive map of Cardinia Shire
- Country: Australia
- State: Victoria
- Region: Greater Melbourne
- Established: 1994
- Council seat: Officer

Government
  - Mayor: Cr Jack Kowarzik
  - State electorates: Bass; Berwick; Monbulk; Narracan; Pakenham
  - Federal divisions: Bruce; Casey; La Trobe

Area
  - Total: 1,283 km^{2} (495 sq mi)

Population
  - Total: 118,194 (2021)
  - Density: 92.12/km^{2} (238.60/sq mi)
- Website: Cardinia Shire
LGAs around Cardinia Shire
| Yarra Ranges | Yarra Ranges | Yarra Ranges |
| Casey | Cardinia Shire | Baw Baw |
| Mornington Peninsula | Bass Coast | South Gippsland |

The Shire of Cardinia is a local government area in Victoria, Australia, in the south-east of Melbourne between Western Port and the Yarra Ranges on the outskirts of Melbourne. It has an area of 1,283 square kilometres (495 sq mi), and recorded a population of 118,194 at the 2021 census.

Cardinia Shire Council Offices are located in Officer. Prior to 17 November 2014, they were located in Pakenham.

== History ==
The areas within the present-day boundaries of Cardinia Shire were originally parts of the Cranbourne and Berwick districts, which were incorporated in 1860 and 1862 respectively. The Shire of Fern Tree Gully, later Shire of Sherbrooke, split away in 1889 and included areas to the east of Melbourne. In 1973, the City of Berwick, including Berwick and areas closer to Dandenong, split away from the Shire of Berwick, with the remainder being renamed Shire of Pakenham.

The Shire came into being on 15 December 1994 as the result of statewide local government reform, by merging the Shire of Pakenham with rural sections of the Shire of Sherbrooke and the City of Cranbourne.

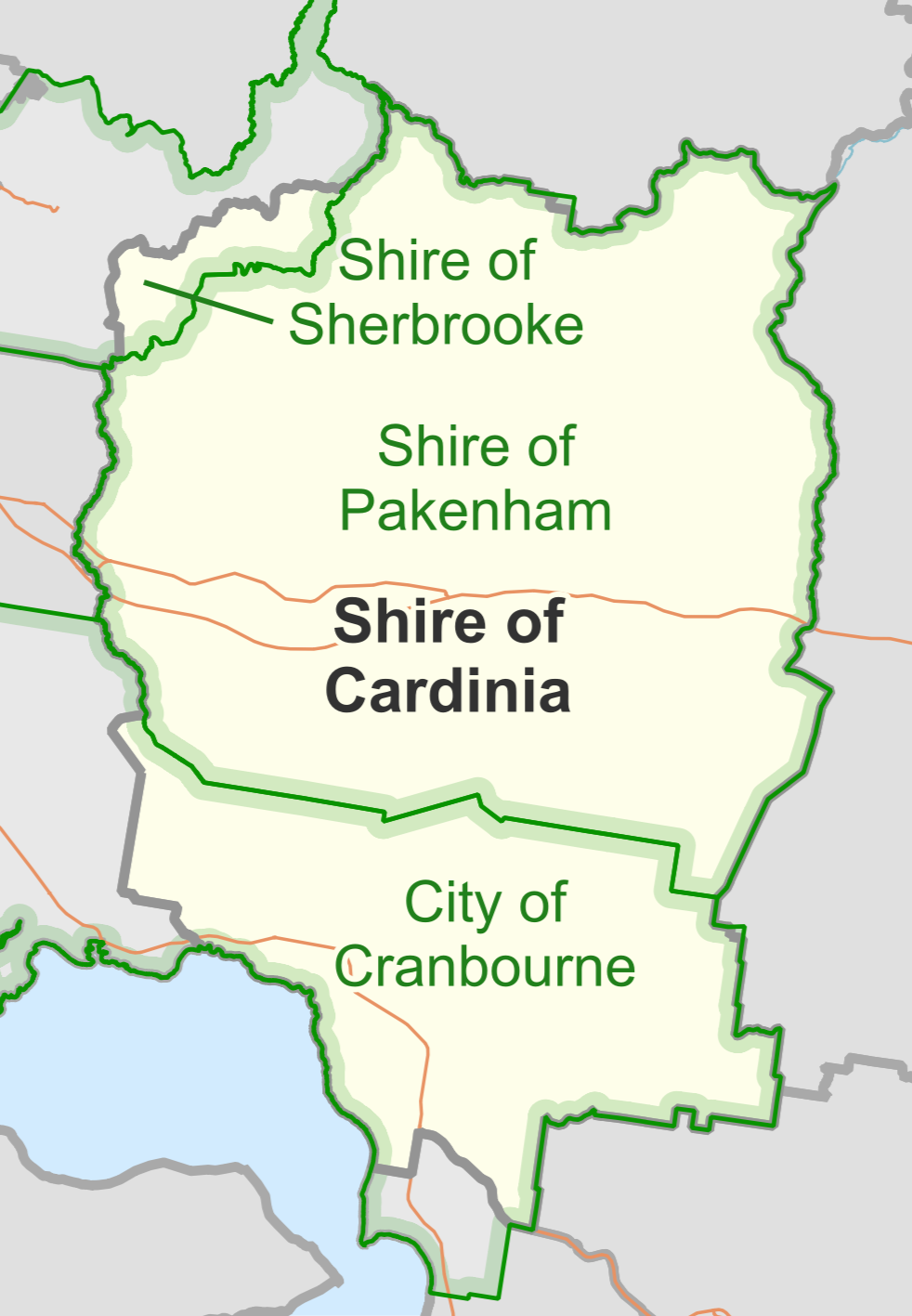
The Shire of Cardinia's predecessor LGAs (green) as they were immediately before their dissolution in December 1994

The Shire of Cardinia contains the only area of Melbourne to use telephone numbers beginning with the exchange prefix 5 - this is a leftover from when it used the area code 059-xx xxxx.

== Council ==
Cardinia Shire Council is divided into nine wards: Beacon Hills, Bunyip, Central, Henty, Officer, Pakenham Hills, Ranges, Toomuc and Westernport. Elections are held every four years, each ward has one councillor. Before October 2020 the shire had three wards: Central, Ranges and Port.

The Council Offices were originally located in Henty Way, Pakenham. On 17 November 2014, the Council moved to a new office on Siding Avenue, Officer, which it uses presently. The Council holds its meetings and all of the administration staff work there.

Cardinia Shire is part of the Casey Cardinia Library Corporation and there are two full-time libraries in Cardinia, in Emerald and Pakenham. In addition, the Mobile Library visits the suburbs of Bunyip, Garfield, Tynong, Beaconsfield, Upper Beaconsfield, Gembrook, Maryknoll, Cockatoo, Lang Lang and Koo Wee Rup.

=== Current composition ===
| Ward | Party | Councillor | Notes |
|---|---|---|---|
| Beacon Hills | Independent | Brett Owen | |
| Bunyip | Independent | Alanna Pomeroy | Deputy Mayor |
| Central | Independent Labor | Collin Ross | |
| Henty | Independent | Liz Roberts | |
| Officer | Independent | Samantha Jane-Potter | |
| Pakenham Hills | Independent | Jack Kowarzik | Mayor |
| Ranges | Independent | David Nickell | |
| Toomuc | Independent | Casey Thomsen | |
| Westernport | Independent Libertarian | Trudi Paton | |

=== Mayors ===
- 2008: Bill Ronald
- 2009: Bill Pearson
- 2010: Graeme Legge
- 2011: George Blenkhorn
- 2012: Ed Chatwin
- 2013: Brett Owen
- 2014: Graeme Moore
- 2015: Leticia Wilmot
- 2016: Jodie Owen
- 2017: Brett Owen
- 2018: Collin Ross
- 2019: Graeme Moore
- 2020: Jeff Springfield
- 2021: Brett Owen
- 2022: Jeff Springfield
- 2023: Tammy Radford
- 2024: Jack Kowarzik

=== Deputy Mayors ===
- 2016: Leticia Wilmot
- 2017: Jodie Owen
- 2018: Brett Owen
- 2019: Collin Ross
- 2020: Graeme Moore
- 2021: Jeff Springfield
- 2022: Tammy Radford
- 2023: Jack Kowarzik
- 2024: Graeme Moore

== Election results ==
=== 2024 ===
2024 Victorian local elections: Cardinia
| Party | Votes | % | Swing | Seats | Change |
|---|---|---|---|---|---|
| Independent | 39,041 | 67.22 | | 7 | Steady |
| Independent Labor | 9,318 | 16.04 | | 1 | ▼1 |
| Independent Liberal | 4,288 | 7.38 | | 0 | Steady |
| Independent Libertarian | 3,720 | 6.41 | | 1 | ▲1 |
| Greens | 875 | 1.51 | | 0 | Steady |
| Victorian Socialists | 834 | 1.44 | | 0 | Steady |
| Formal votes | 58,076 | 95.75 | | | |
| Informal votes | 2,575 | 4.25 | | | |
| Total | 60,651 | 100.00 | | 9 | Steady |
| Registered voters | 82,745 | | | | |

== Townships and localities ==
In the 2021 census, the shire had a population of 118,194, up from 94,128 in the 2016 census.

Population
| Locality | 2016 | 2021 |
|---|---|---|
| Avonsleigh | 852 | 844 |
| Bayles | 461 | 445 |
| Beaconsfield^ | 6,714 | 7,267 |
| Beaconsfield Upper | 2,861 | 2,997 |
| Bunyip | 2,468 | 3,131 |
| Bunyip North | 112 | 95 |
| Caldermeade | 183 | 181 |
| Cardinia | 376 | 342 |
| Catani | 294 | 297 |
| Clematis | 350 | 352 |
| Cockatoo | 4,256 | 4,408 |
| Cora Lynn | 243 | 220 |
| Dalmore | 163 | 142 |
| Dewhurst | 164 | 151 |
| Emerald^ | 5,778 | 5,890 |
| Garfield | 1,786 | 2,114 |
| Garfield North | 194 | 236 |
| Gembrook | 2,350 | 2,559 |
| Guys Hill | 382 | 388 |
| Heath Hill^ | 161 | 189 |
| Iona | 228 | 240 |
| Koo Wee Rup | 3,579 | 4,047 |
| Koo Wee Rup North | 44 | 47 |
| Lang Lang^ | 1,585 | 2,556 |
| Lang Lang East | 79 | 94 |
| Longwarry^ | 2,004 | 2,436 |
| Maryknoll | 577 | 646 |
| Menzies Creek^ | 998 | 966 |
| Modella^ | 148 | 169 |
| Monomeith | 72 | 69 |
| Mount Burnett | 173 | 180 |
| Nangana | 44 | 54 |
| Nar Nar Goon | 1,012 | 1,023 |
| Nar Nar Goon North | 727 | 819 |
| Nyora^ | 1,527 | 1,644 |
| Officer | 7,133 | 18,503 |
| Officer South | 75 | 1,159 |
| Pakenham | 46,421 | 54,118 |
| Pakenham South | 216 | 229 |
| Pakenham Upper | 1,172 | 1,196 |
| Rythdale | 38 | 33 |
| Tonimbuk | 208 | 229 |
| Tooradin^ | 1,568 | 1,722 |
| Tynong | 456 | 523 |
| Tynong North | 434 | 440 |
| Vervale | 39 | 44 |
| Yannathan | 238 | 272 |

^ - Territory divided with another LGA

== See also ==
- List of places on the Victorian Heritage Register in the Shire of Cardinia
- Mornington Peninsula and Western Port Biosphere Reserve
