= Guys Hill =

Coordinates: 38°01′01″S 145°23′10″E

- Town
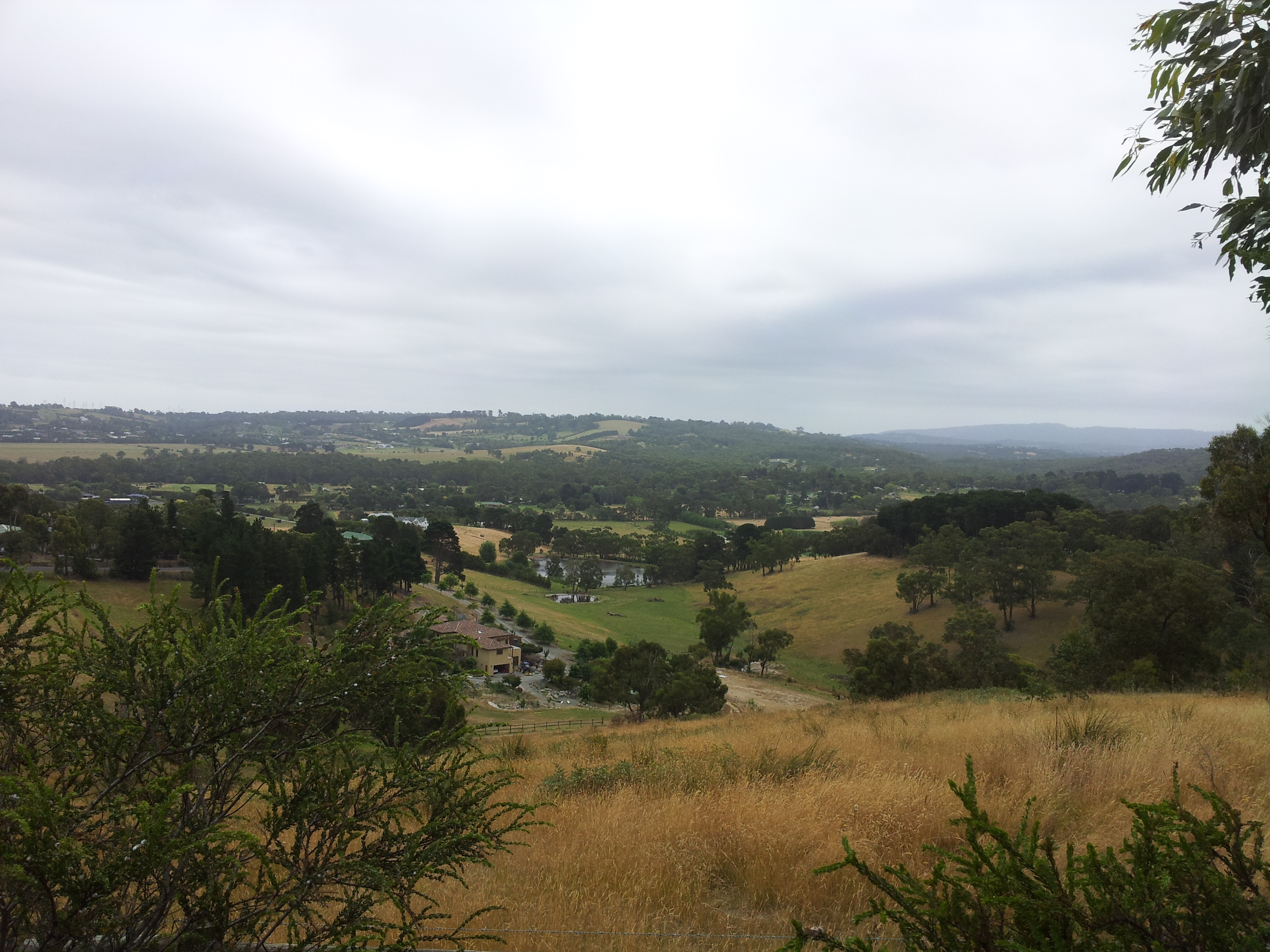
- Interactive map of Guys Hill
- Country: Australia
- State: Victoria
- LGA: Shire of Cardinia
- Location: 43 km (27 mi) from Melbourne

Government
  - State electorate: Gembrook
  - Federal division: La Trobe

Population
  - Total: 388 (2021 census)
- Postcode: 3807
Localities around Guys Hill
Harkaway	Beaconsfield Upper	Beaconsfield Upper
Berwick	Guys Hill	Officer
Berwick	Beaconsfield	Officer

Guys Hill is a rural locality in Melbourne, Victoria, Australia, 43 km south-east of Melbourne's Central Business District, located within the Shire of Cardinia local government area. Guys Hill recorded a population of 388 at the 2021 census.

Guys Hill is located about halfway between Beaconsfield and Upper Beaconsfield. The Guys Hill Post Office opened on 1 September 1942.

Golfers play at the Berwick-Montuna Golf Club on Emerald-Beaconsfield Road, Guys Hill.

== See also ==
- Shire of Pakenham — Guys Hill was previously within this former local government area.
