= Officer South, Victoria =

Officer South
- Suburb
- Coordinates: 38.0924°S 145.4237°E
- Country: Australia
- State: Victoria
- City: Melbourne
- LGA: Shire of Cardinia
- Location: 50.8 km (31.6 mi) from Melbourne GPO

Government
  - State electorate: Bass
  - Federal division: La Trobe

Population
  - Total: 1,159 (2021 census)
- Postcode: 3809
Suburbs around Officer South
Officer	Officer	Pakenham
Clyde North	Officer South	Pakenham
Clyde North	Cardinia	Pakenham South

Officer South is a suburb in Melbourne, Victoria, Australia, 50 km (31 mi) south-east of Melbourne's Central Business District, located within the Shire of Cardinia local government area. Officer South recorded a population of 1,159 at the 2021 census.

== History ==
Officer South is situated in the Kulin nation traditional Aboriginal country. The Boon wurrung people are local custodians within the Kulin nation.

The origin of the suburb name is from the name of the Officer family who had lived in the area, and the geographic location south of the main Officer settlement.

The first residential development in Officer South is the Kaduna Park Estate, which is being released across 18 stages by Parklea Developments. The first stage was approved in 2018.
