= Bunyip North =

- Town
- Coordinates: 38°04′S 145°43′E
- Country: Australia
- State: Victoria
- LGA: Shire of Cardinia
- Location: 74 km (46 mi) from Melbourne

Government
  - State electorate: Narracan
  - Federal division: La Trobe

Population
  - Total: 95 (2021 census)
- Postcode: 3815

Bunyip North is a locality in Victoria, Australia, 74 kilometres (46 mi) south-east of Melbourne's central business district, located within the Shire of Cardinia local government area. Bunyip North recorded a population of 95 at the 2021 census.

== See also ==
- Shire of Pakenham – Bunyip North was previously within this former local government area.
