= Heath Hill =

- Town
- Interactive map of Heath Hill
- Coordinates: 38.244°S 145.692°E
- Country: Australia
- State: Victoria
- LGAs: Shire of Baw Baw; Shire of Cardinia
- Location: 79 km (49 mi) from Melbourne

Government
  - State electorate: Bass
  - Federal division: Monash

Population
  - Total: 189 (2021 census)
- Postcode: 3981

Heath Hill is a locality in Victoria, Australia, 79 kilometres (49 mi) south-east of Melbourne's Central Business District, located within the Shires of Baw Baw and Cardinia local government areas. Heath Hill recorded a population of 189 at the 2021 census.

Heath Hill Post Office opened on 1 June 1883 and closed in 1962.

== See also ==
- City of Cranbourne – Heath Hill was previously within this former local government area.
