= Vervale =

- Town
- Coordinates: 38°08′S 145°40′E
- Country: Australia
- State: Victoria
- LGA: Shire of Cardinia
- Location: 71 km (44 mi) from Melbourne

Government
  - State electorate: Bass
  - Federal division: Monash

Population
  - Total: 44 (2021 census)
- Postcode: 3814

Vervale is a locality in Victoria, Australia, 71 kilometres (44 mi) south-east of Melbourne's central business district, located within the Shire of Cardinia local government area. Vervale recorded a population of 44 at the 2021 census.

== History ==
The Post Office opened as Kirwan's in 1909, was renamed Vervale in 1917 and closed in 1967. The Post Office and General Store was taken over by James and Edith McMannis in 1916. It closed in 1967 after the death of Mrs. McMannis, who died on 4 June 1967, Mr. McMannis having predeceased her on 9 April 1959.

Vervale was one of the first places in Victoria where asparagus was grown commercially. Mr. Thomas Roxburgh first grew asparagus on his Vervale farm in 1912.

The school at Vervale, located on the corner of Thirteen Mile Road and Main Drain Road, opened in 1894 as Koo-Wee-Rup North No. 3201, it changed its name to Bunyip South in 1899 and changed its name again in 1905 to Iona State School. The school closed in December 1993.

== Demographics ==
The joint population of Vervale and Iona in the 2011 census was 363; 196 males and 167 females.

== See also ==
- Shire of Pakenham – Vervale was previously within this former local government area.
