= Modella =

- Town
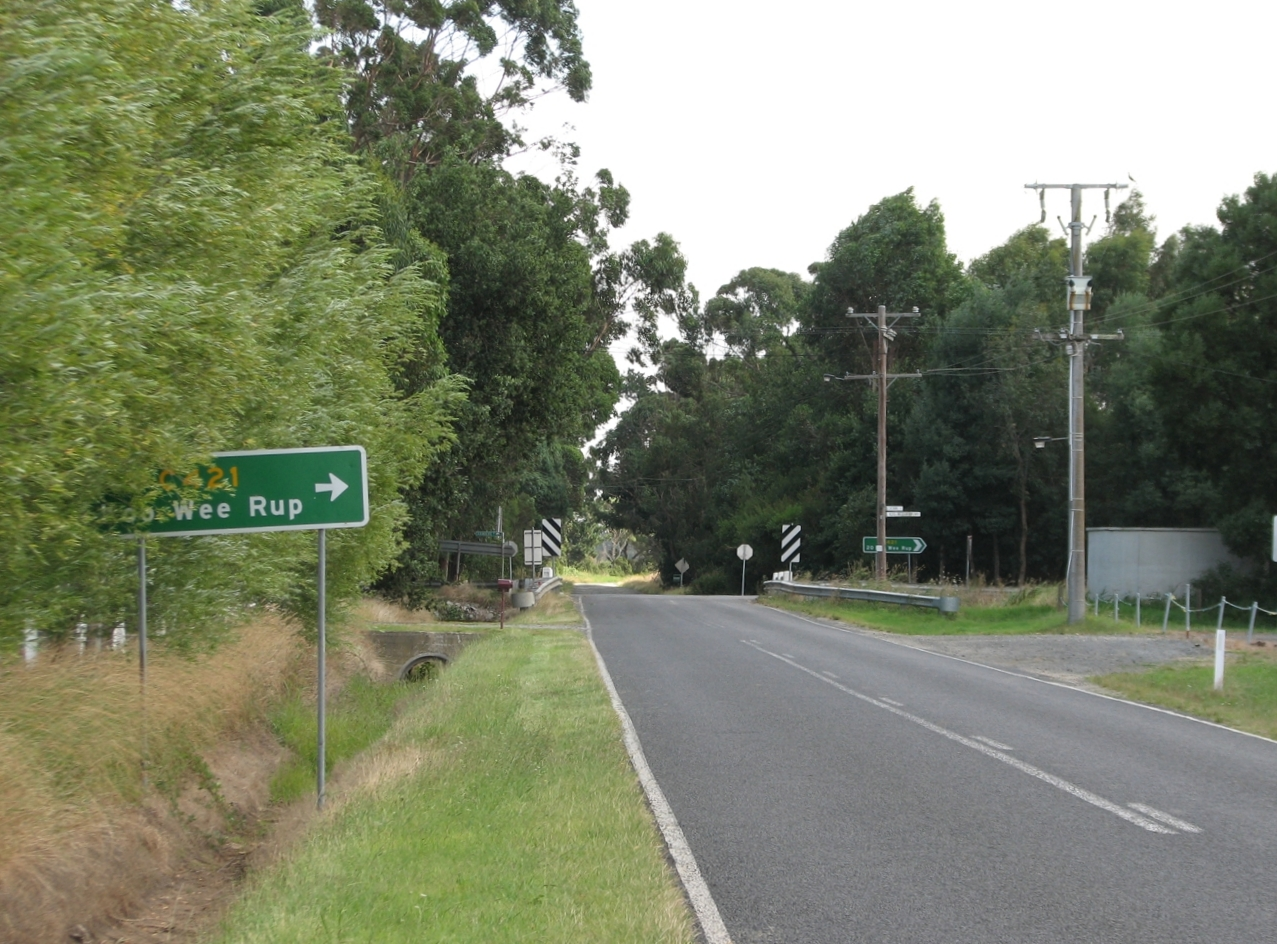

- Coordinates: 38°11′S 145°43′E
- Country: Australia
- State: Victoria
- LGAs: Shire of Baw Baw; Shire of Cardinia

Government
  - State electorate: Narracan
  - Federal division: Monash

Population
  - Total: 169 (2021 census)
- Postcode: 3816

Modella is a locality in Victoria, Australia, 77 kilometres (48 mi) south-east of Melbourne's central business district, located within the Shires of Baw Baw and Cardinia local government areas. Modella recorded a population of 169 at the 2021 census.

== History ==
Modella Post Office opened on 2 December 1904 and closed in 1962.
