= Tonimbuk =

- Town
- Interactive map of Tonimbuk
- Coordinates: 38°0′S 145°43′E
- Country: Australia
- State: Victoria
- LGA: Shire of Cardinia
- Location: 70 km (43 mi) from Melbourne

Government
  - State electorate: Bass
  - Federal division: Monash

Population
  - Total: 229 (2021 census)
- Postcode: 3815

Tonimbuk is a locality in Victoria, Australia, 70 kilometres (43 mi) south-east of Melbourne's Central Business District, located within the Shire of Cardinia local government area. Tonimbuk recorded a population of 229 at the 2021 census.

== History ==
A Telegraph Office was open in Tonimbuk from 1953 until 1959.

Devastating fires in early March 2019 almost wiped this town off the map. It has since recovered and, like the state forests and farmlands that surround it, is now growing again.

== See also ==
- Shire of Pakenham – Tonimbuk was previously within this former local government area.
