= Yannathan =

- Town
- Interactive map of Yannathan
- Coordinates: 38°14′S 145°38′E
- Country: Australia
- State: Victoria
- LGA: Shire of Cardinia
- Location: 75 km (47 mi) from Melbourne

Government
  - State electorate: Bass
  - Federal division: Monash

Population
  - Total: 272 (2021 census)
- Postcode: 3981

Yannathan is a locality in Victoria, Australia, 75 kilometres (47 mi) south-east of Melbourne's central business district, located within the Shire of Cardinia local government area. Yannathan recorded a population of 272 at the 2021 census.

== History ==
Yannathan Post Office opened on 15 September 1884 and closed in 1959.

== See also ==
- City of Cranbourne – Yannathan was previously within this former local government area.
