= Avonsleigh =

- Town
- Interactive map of Avonsleigh
- Coordinates: 37°55′30″S 145°28′55″E
- Country: Australia
- State: Victoria
- LGA: Shire of Cardinia
- Location: 47 km (29 mi) from Melbourne

Government
  - State electorate: Monbulk
  - Federal division: La Trobe

Population
  - Total: 844 (2021 census)
- Postcode: 3782

Avonsleigh is a town in Victoria, Australia, 47 km east of Melbourne's central business district, located within the Shire of Cardinia local government area. Avonsleigh recorded a population of 844 at the 2021 census.

== History ==
The Post Office opened as Koenig's in 1902, was renamed Avonsleigh in 1911 and closed in 1985. It was named after the Avonsleigh guest house owned by J.W. Wright.

== See also ==
- Shire of Sherbrooke – Avonsleigh was previously within this former local government area.
