= Caldermeade =

Coordinates: 38°15′00″S 145°33′07″E

- Town
- Interactive map of Caldermeade
- Country: Australia
- State: Victoria
- LGA: Shire of Cardinia
- Location: 71 km (44 mi) from Melbourne

Government
  - State electorate: Bass
  - Federal division: Monash

Population
  - Total: 181 (2021 census)
- Postcode: 3984

Caldermeade is a locality in Victoria, Australia, 71 kilometres (44 mi) south-east of Melbourne's central business district, located within the Shire of Cardinia local government area. Caldermeade recorded a population of 181 at the 2021 census.

== History ==
Caldermeade Post Office opened on 14 January 1901 and closed in 1967.

A railway station was located here from 1890 until the 1960s on the South Gippsland railway line.

== See also ==
- City of Cranbourne – Caldermeade was previously within this former local government area.
