= Lang Lang East =

- Town
- Coordinates: 38°15′S 145°39′E
- Country: Australia
- State: Victoria
- LGA: Shire of Cardinia
- Location: 79 km (49 mi) from Melbourne

Government
  - State electorate: Bass
  - Federal division: Monash

Population
  - Total: 94 (2021 census)
- Postcode: 3984

Lang Lang East is a locality in Victoria, Australia, 79 kilometres (49 mi) south-east of Melbourne's Central Business District, located within the Shire of Cardinia local government area. Lang Lang East recorded a population of 94 at the 2021 census.

== History ==
A Lang Lang East Post Office opened on 16 March 1885 but was replaced by Nyora in 1890.
