= Rythdale =

Coordinates: 38°09′00″S 145°27′22″E

- Town
- Country: Australia
- State: Victoria
- LGA: Shire of Cardinia
- Location: 57 km (35 mi) from Melbourne

Government
  - State electorate: Bass
  - Federal division: La Trobe

Population
  - Total: 33 (2021 census)
- Postcode: 3810

Rythdale is a locality in Victoria, Australia, 57 kilometres (35 mi) south-east of Melbourne's central business district, located within the Shire of Cardinia local government area. Rythdale recorded a population of 33 at the 2021 census.

== History ==
Rythedale Post Office opened on 22 June 1925, was renamed Rythdale around 1930 and closed in 1944.

== Today ==
Rythdale forms part of the Australian Rules ROC Football Club (Rythdale, Officer, Cardinia) competing in the Mornington Peninsula Nepean Football League.

== See also ==
- Shire of Pakenham – Rythdale was previously within this former local government area.
