= Pakenham, Victoria =

Pakenham
- Suburb
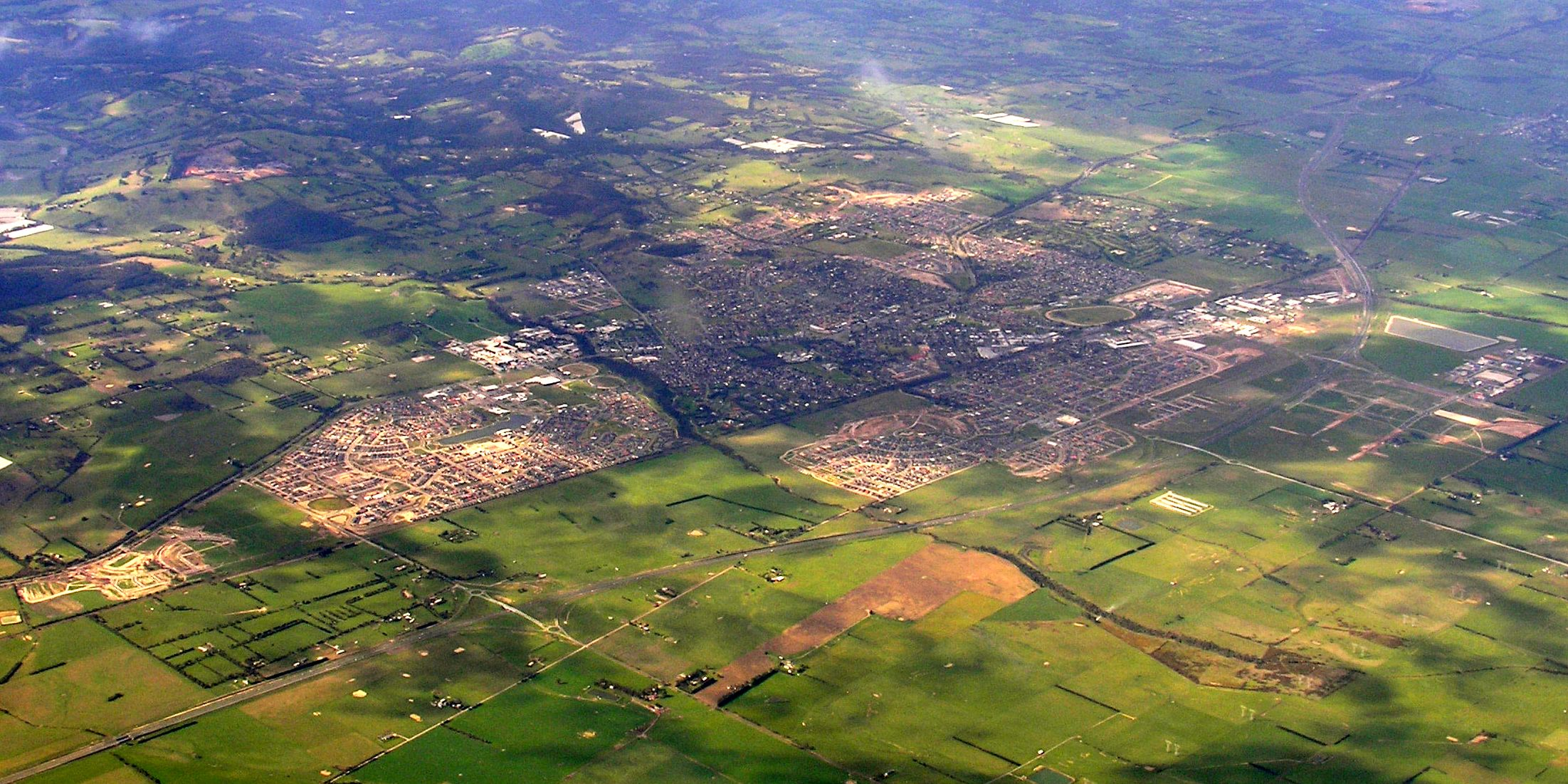
- Aerial view from south-west, 2008

- Interactive map of Pakenham
- Coordinates: 38.0712°S 145.4878°E
- Country: Australia
- State: Victoria
- City: Melbourne
- LGA: Shire of Cardinia
- Location: 53 km (33 mi) from Melbourne; 14 km (8.7 mi) from Berwick

Government
  - State electorate: Pakenham
  - Federal division: La Trobe

Area
  - Total: 85.9 km^{2} (33.2 sq mi)
- Elevation: 101 m (331 ft)

Population
  - Total: 54,118 (2021 census)
  - Density: 630.0/km^{2} (1,631.7/sq mi)
- Postcode: 3810
- Mean max temp: 23.4 °C (74.1 °F)
- Mean min temp: 12.3 °C (54.1 °F)
- Annual rainfall: 865 mm (34.1 in)
Suburbs around Pakenham
Beaconsfield Upper	Pakenham Upper	Nar Nar Goon North
Officer	Pakenham	Nar Nar Goon
Officer South	Honora Fields	Honora Fields

Pakenham (/ˈpækənəm/ PACK-kən-əm) is a suburb of Melbourne in Victoria, Australia, 53 km (33 mi) south-east of Melbourne's Central Business District and the most populous in the Shire of Cardinia. Pakenham recorded a population of 54,118 at the 2021 census.

Pakenham has become a major growth area in south-eastern Melbourne as new housing developments have boosted its population and infrastructure, as exemplified in the development of the Lakeside, Heritage Springs and Cardinia Lakes estates.

== History ==
Pakenham is situated in the Kulin nation traditional Aboriginal country. The Boon Wurrung people are local custodians within the Kulin nation.

Pakenham was named after Sir Edward Pakenham (19 March 1778 – 8 January 1815), a British Major General who fought in the Peninsular War. On 8 January 1815, Pakenham was killed in action while leading his men at the Battle of New Orleans. The Neville and Bourke families arrived in Sydney on the Alquis in 1837, sponsored by the Governor George Gipps to migrate and settle in Melbourne. They arrived in Melbourne on the John Barry in 1839 and selected 5 miles by 5 miles of land now known as the area of Upper Pakenham.

The original Pakenham Post Office opened on 1 February 1859, was renamed Pakenham West on 1 October 1971, and was closed on 15 January 1974. The existing Pakenham Post Office was opened on 11 June 1888 as Pakenham Railway Station Post Office, was renamed Pakenham East in 1908, and further renamed Pakenham on 1 October 1971. The railway station was opened on 8 October 1877 and was a part of the east link connecting Melbourne to Pakenham and other eastern towns.

In Pakenham there is the Cardinia Civic Concert Band Hall. The band originally started out as a brass band in the late 1880s. In the 1970s the band became a concert band and now has 60 members of all ages, abilities and instrumentations. The band currently performs at various events around the Cardinia Shire.

== Demographics ==
Historical population
Year	Pop.	±%
2006	19,644	—
2011	33,999	+73.1%
2016	46,421	+36.5%
2021	54,118	+16.6%

In Pakenham 71.2% of people were born in Australia. The most common ancestries in Pakenham were English 27.3%, Australian 25.5%, Irish 6.7%, Scottish 6.2% and German 2.8%. The most common countries of birth outside of Australia were England 4.0%, India 2.8%, New Zealand 2.3%, Sri Lanka 1.3% and Philippines 1.0%. 0.9% of people in Pakenham are Aboriginal. The most common responses for religion in Pakenham were No Religion, so described 34.8%, Catholic 21.2%, Anglican 11.1%, Not stated 8.5% and Christian, nfd 3.8%. In Pakenham, Christianity was the largest religious group reported overall 53.8%.

== Transport ==
Pakenham is on the main railway line between Melbourne and Gippsland, and the station in East Pakenham marks the end of the suburban electrified service. East Pakenham Station is the termination point of all services operated by Metro Trains Melbourne heading out of the city, but V/Line trains to and from Gippsland also serve Pakenham.

=== Rail transport ===
The suburb is served by three suburban railway stations, with Pakenham railway station and Cardinia Road railway station serving the bulk of the population. Cardinia Road station carried its first train services on Sunday 22 April 2012, and another station was opened in East Pakenham on 3 June 2024. The suburb also contains part of the Pakenham East railway depot, housing trains for use on Melbourne's commuter rail system.

=== Road transport ===
Pakenham is also on the Princes Highway. The Pakenham Bypass allows road traffic between Melbourne and Gippsland to bypass Pakenham, both shortening travel times and alleviating traffic congestion within Pakenham. The main north–south roads through Pakenham head north to Healesville and south to Koo Wee Rup. Buses run from the train station to the other parts of Pakenham.

== Media ==
Pakenham is serviced by one local newspaper: Star News Group's The Pakenham-Berwick Gazette, available every Wednesday for $1. Star's widely distributed Pakenham News, is dropped into mailboxes free every Thursday around the town.

Well over 100 years old, Star News Group houses its main headquarters on the Princes Highway in Pakenham.

Pakenham is in the coverage range of all the commercial radio stations in Melbourne, yet are also locally serviced by 94.3 Star FM, whose studios are situated in Warragul, about 45 kilometres (28 miles) away from the town.

Television services in the town are exactly the same as Melbourne's, yet being in the Gippsland area, regional television can also be accessed. Services such as WIN Gippsland and Southern Cross Nine are available to viewers, yet the signal strength tends to become stronger in the east of the town.

== Facilities ==
The Pakenham Community Garden, located at 6 Henry Street, uses organic chemical-free gardening principles and is collectively managed by a diverse group of volunteers. Situated next to Living & Learning Pakenham, the garden boasts a perennial food garden including several fruit trees, a small greenhouse plus over 40 raised garden beds, each featuring annual and perennial types of fruits, vegetables, herbs and flowers

=== Recreation ===
Pakenham's public facilities include a sports and aquatic centre, Community Centre and Council Offices.

The aquatic centre includes a 25m indoor pool, with a gym, group fitness, creche, eight multipurpose sports courts and food facilities all incorporated in the one building. The centre, named Cardinia LiFE, is owned by the Cardinia Shire and managed by Aligned Leisure. Pakenham also has an outdoor pool open during the warmer weather. This was originally opened in 1957, and was reopened on 17 November 2007 after undergoing a $1.1 million redevelopment. The outdoor pool centre, also managed by Aligned Leisure, consists of a 50m pool, toddlers' pool with splash features, updated change rooms, kiosk, and water treatment plant.

Located on Webster Way, the Pakenham Regional Tennis Centre boasts 18 floodlit courts all with plexicushion surfacing which is the same court surface as Melbourne Park, home of the Australian Open. The centre is Council-owned and managed by Aligned Leisure. The partnership is committed to providing a tennis centre for the community, to encourage tennis clubs, associations, schools and youth groups participate in tennis programs and tournaments. Pakenham currently has one tennis club but proposals for a second are under consideration, with planned expenses for the clubhouse alone around $20 million.

Pakenham's Community Centre is a Neighbourhood House & Learn Local Community College located in Henry Street, managed by Living & Learning Pakenham Inc., provides a wide range of courses, programs, projects and services to enhance the community participation and health and wellbeing opportunities for residents throughout the Cardinia Shire.

=== Education ===
Public schools include Pakenham Springs Primary School, Pakenham Consolidated Primary School, Pakenham Hills Primary School, Pakenham Lakeside Primary School, John Henry Primary School, Edenbrook Secondary College and Pakenham Secondary College.

Private schools include Beaconhills College (Valley Campus), Chairo Christian School (Pakenham Campus) and Lakeside College. Pakenham has one Catholic school St Patrick's Catholic Primary.

== Retail ==
Pakenham serves as a major retail centre in the Cardinia Shire, with outlets including an Aldi supermarket, two Woolworths supermarkets, four Coles supermarkets, two Bunnings and two McDonald's. In August 2009 it was announced by Cardinia Shire Council that an $80 million retail development would be built at current vacant Council land behind the Pakenham Library at the corner of John and Henty street. The centre is the largest in Pakenham, containing anchor stores such as a Woolworths supermarket, Cotton On, EB Games Australia and Big W, as well as 39 smaller specialty stores and 1,150 car parking spaces both above ground and underground. The Pakenham Central Marketplace opened on 1 December 2011.

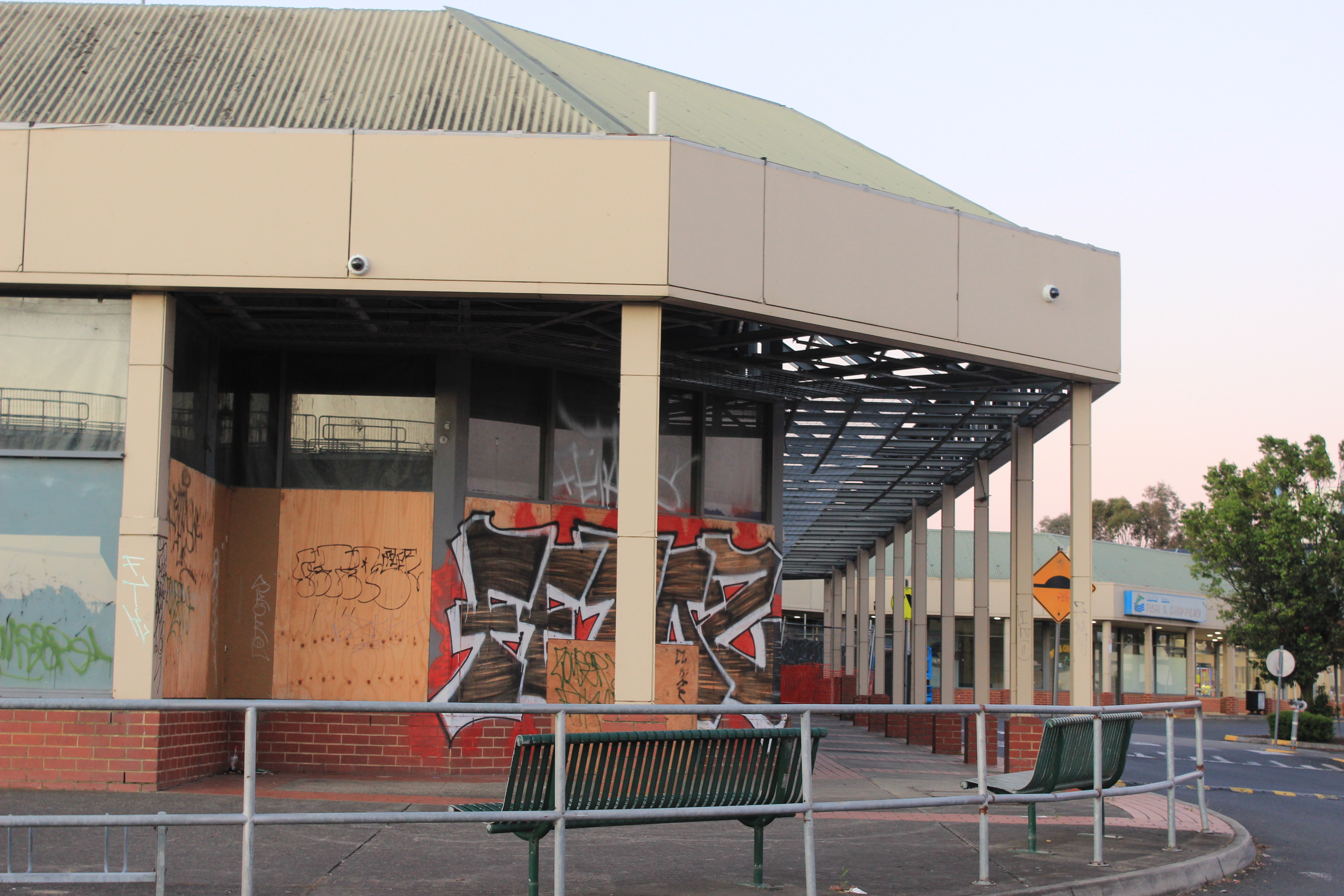
Former Target wing of Pakenham Place Shopping Centre in December 2024

Target closed its department store in the Pakenham Place Shopping Centre in mid 2021.

== Sport ==
Sporting activities in Pakenham include horse racing, lawn bowls, golf, baseball, field hockey, cricket, little athletics, tennis, netball, floorball, basketball, rugby league, gridiron and Australian Rules Football

The local gridiron team, Pakenham Silverbacks are the reigning divisional champions. The Pakenham Pumas baseball club has senior men's, women's and junior teams competing in both the winter and summer competitions.

The Southside Racing Club schedules around thirty race meetings a year including the Pakenham Cup meeting in December. The Pakenham Picnic Racing Club also holds a meeting at the racecourse on New Year's Day.

Pakenham's Australian Rules football team, the Pakenham Lions competes in the Outer East Football Netball League. Hawthorn premiership ruck rover Peter Russo was raised in Pakenham, as was former Collingwood speedster Tyson Goldsack.

Pakenham's field hockey team, Cardinia Storm, has both senior men's and women's teams in Metro 2.

Pakenham Eels play rugby league in NRL Victoria.

The Pakenham basketball team, the Pakenham Warriors. Pakenham basketball association has new team called Officer Bulls and they train students and play competitions at Cardinia Cultural Club.

Pakenham also has its own cricket team, the Lions, who have numerous teams, both junior and senior level.

The tennis club in Pakenham had a major make over and now has six brand new courts, this is all part of the local councils "Whip into shape" plan that consists of the remodeling and updating of the local sports and recreation locations. The local rugby league team the Pakenham Eels was established in 2015.

Golfers play at the Pakenham and District Golf Club on Oaktree Drive.

Also home to the local soccer club, Pakenham United FC, Henry road, Pakenham.

There are at least three different gyms in the area.

A motorsport precinct that had two small clubs based in the area is proposed to be built up into a larger facility called Cardinia Motor Recreation and Education Park. It received final approvals to develop in December 2019.

== Environmental concerns ==
Since 2007, locals have been concerned by a re-occurring smell which has been regularly engulfing the town, impacting upon the amenity and health of local residents and visitors. It had been described by some as resembling a burning chemical gas smell, the stench of dead bodies or as a putrid smell that was able to infiltrate homes. The smell was found to originate from the Drovers Place area where Transpacific Industries, a leading organic waste recycler, was based. The business has since closed. Concerns over the rapid pace of urban expansion in the Pakenham area have also been raised, as traditional farmland surrounding the town has been rezoned to allow for the development of housing estates, causing protests by some residents who have sought to have these undeveloped or 'green wedge' lands protected.

== See also ==
- Shire of Pakenham – Pakenham was previously within this former local government area
