= Cardinia, Victoria =

Coordinates: 38°08′49″S 145°25′23″E

Cardinia
- Town
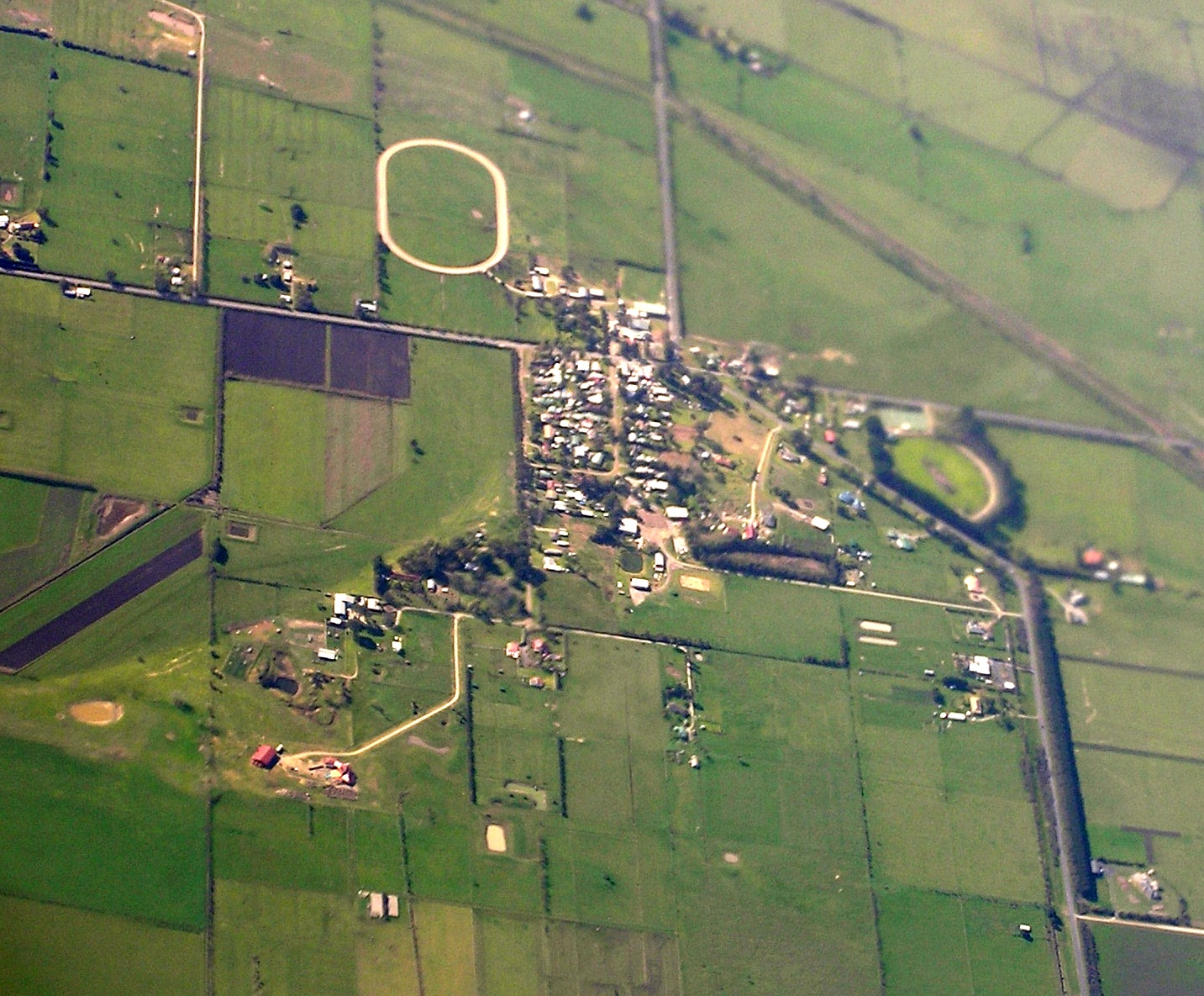
- Aerial photo from the south-west
- Interactive map of Cardinia
- Country: Australia
- State: Victoria
- LGA: Shire of Cardinia
- Location: 52 km (32 mi) from Melbourne; 16 km (9.9 mi) from Cranbourne

Government
  - State electorate: Bass
  - Federal division: La Trobe
- Elevation: 55 m (180 ft)

Population
  - Total: 342 (2021 census)
- Postcode: 3978

Cardinia is a town in Victoria, Australia, 52 km south-east of Melbourne's Central Business District, located within the Shire of Cardinia local government area. Cardinia recorded a population of 342 at the 2021 census.

Cardinia is located between Pakenham and Tooradin on the south-eastern fringe of Melbourne.

The Post Office opened on 1 September 1881, was known as Cardinia Creek until 1912, and closed in 1970.

Cardinia is part of the Australian Rules ROC Football Club (Rythdale, Officer, Cardinia) competing in the Mornington Peninsula Nepean Football League.

== See also ==
- City of Cranbourne – Cardinia was previously within this former local government area.
