= Electoral district of Pakenham =

State electoral district of Victoria, Australia

Coordinates: 38°04′S 145°29′E

Pakenham Victoria—Legislative Assembly
- Interactive map of electoral district boundaries from the 2022 state election
- State: Victoria
- Dates current: 1992–2002; 2022–present
- MP: Emma Vulin
- Party: Labor
- Namesake: Suburb of Pakenham
- Area: 226 km^{2} (87.3 sq mi)
- Demographic: Outer metropolitan
Electorates around Pakenham:
	Monbulk
Berwick	Pakenham	Narracan
	Bass

The electoral district of Pakenham is an electoral district of the Legislative Assembly in the Australian state of Victoria. Originally created for the 1992 election and abolished at the 2002 election, it was recreated in the redistribution of electoral boundaries in 2021, and was re-contested at the 2022 Victorian state election.

It includes the outer south-eastern suburbs of Officer, Officer South, and Pakenham, as well as less populated regional areas to the north and south of the Pakenham railway line.

== Members for Pakenham ==
First incarnation (1992–2002)
Rob Maclellan	Liberal	1992–2002
Second incarnation (2022–present)
Emma Vulin	Labor	2022–2026

== Election results ==
2022 Victorian state election: Pakenham
Party	Candidate	Votes	%	±%
Labor	Emma Vulin	13,151	33.8	−11.5
Liberal	David Farrelly	12,605	32.4	−9.8
Independent	Brett Owen	3,157	8.1	+8.1
Greens	Michelle Maibaum	2,571	6.6	−0.8
Legalise Cannabis	Elissa Smith	2,010	5.2	+5.2
One Nation	Angela Siladji	1,321	3.4	+3.4
Family First	Christopher Gore	1,218	3.1	+3.1
Animal Justice	Hannah Pledger-Firth	978	2.5	+2.5
Freedom	Sammi Clarke	956	2.5	+2.5
Democratic Labour	Sarasadat Sarkeshik	666	1.7	+0.1
Independent	Rajvir Singh Sagoo	234	0.6	+0.6
Total formal votes		38,867	92.6	−1.1
Informal votes		3.089	7.4	+1.1
Turnout		41,956	87.4	+14.9
Two-party-preferred result
Labor	Emma Vulin	19,587	50.4	−1.8
Liberal	David Farrelly	19,280	49.6	+1.8
Labor hold		Swing	–1.8	

== See also ==
- Parliaments of the Australian states and territories
- List of members of the Victorian Legislative Assembly
