= Koo Wee Rup North =

Coordinates: 38°08′53″S 145°31′48″E

- Town
- Country: Australia
- State: Victoria
- LGA: Shire of Cardinia
- Location: 62 km (39 mi) from Melbourne

Government
  - State electorate: Bass
  - Federal divisions: La Trobe; Monash

Population
  - Total: 47 (2021 census)
- Postcode: 3891

Koo Wee Rup North is a locality in Victoria, Australia, 62 kilometres (39 mi) south-east of Melbourne's central business district, located within the Shire of Cardinia local government area. Koo Wee Rup North recorded a population of 47 at the 2021 census.

== History ==
Koo-Wee-Rup South Post Office opened around 1902, was renamed Koo-Wee-Rup North in 1921 and closed in 1974.
