= Princes Freeway =

Freeway in Victoria, Australia

Princes Freeway Victoria
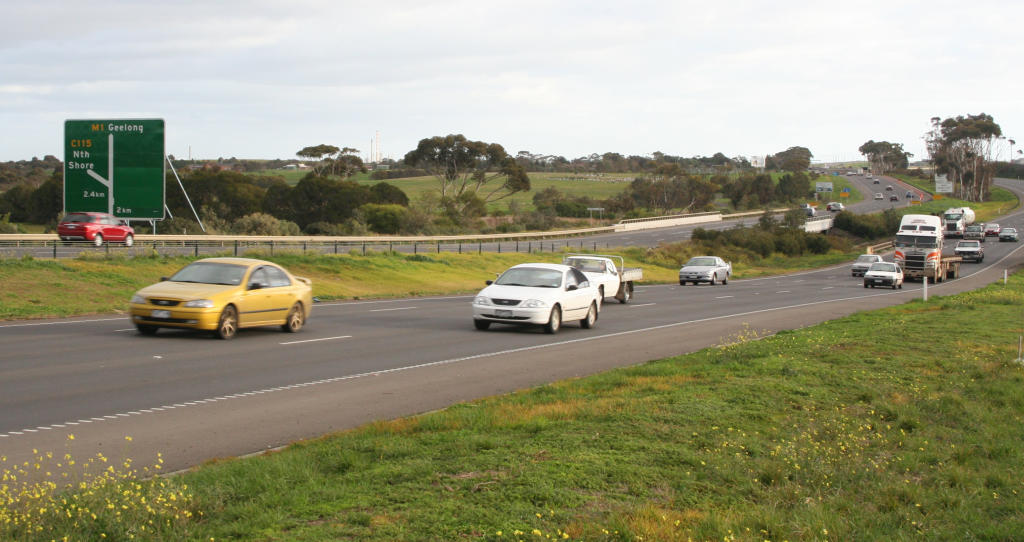
- Princes Freeway at Lara

General information
- Type: Freeway
- Length: 159 km (99 mi)
- Route number(s): (1997–present)
- Former route number: National Route 1 (1955–1997)
- Tourist routes: Tourist Route 21 (Corio–Altona North)

Major junctions
Princes Freeway (West)
- SW end: Geelong Ring Road; Corio, Geelong
- Princes Highway; Shell Parade; Geelong Road; Duncans Road; Princes Highway; Old Geelong Road; Forsyth Road; Palmers Road; Central Avenue; Old Geelong Road; Kororoit Creek Road; Western Ring Road; Geelong Road
- NE end: West Gate Freeway; Laverton North, Melbourne
Princes Freeway (East)
- West end: Monash Freeway; Narre Warren, Melbourne
- Princes Highway; Clyde Road; O'Shea Road; Cardinia Road; Koo Wee Rup Road; Nar Nar Goon Connection Road; Sand Road; Princes Way; Princes Drive; Strzelecki Highway
- East end: Princes Highway; Morwell, Victoria

Location(s)
- Major suburbs / towns: Geelong, Little River, Werribee, Laverton, Drouin, Warragul, Moe, Morwell

Highway system
- Highways in Australia; National Highway • Freeways in Australia; Highways in Victoria

Princes Freeway is a 159-kilometre (99 mi) Australian freeway, divided into two sections, both located in Victoria, Australia. The freeway links Melbourne to Geelong in the west, and to Morwell in the east. It continues beyond these extremities as the Princes Highway towards Adelaide to the west and Sydney to the northeast. The freeway bears the designation M1.

The western section linking Geelong and Melbourne is an important commuter, freight and tourism route between the two cities; the eastern section links Melbourne with the Latrobe Valley and major business suburbs, namely Dandenong and Berwick. The entire freeway is one of the busiest sections of rural highway in Victoria, used by large numbers of freight and commercial vehicles and provides access to tourist attractions in central and east Gippsland. It supports Victoria's rural industries and tourism.

== Route ==
The western section (also known as Princes Freeway West or Geelong Road) starts at Corio, in the northern suburbs of Geelong and heads north-east as a six-lane dual-carriageway freeway, widening to eight lanes east of Werribee, and ends at the West Gate Interchange in Laverton, where the Western Ring Road and the old Geelong Road can be accessed by off-ramps. This section ranges from six lanes (three in each direction) between Geelong and Werribee, to ten lanes near the Ring Road interchange. Between 1999 and 2003 the section from Hoppers Crossing to Geelong was progressively widened to provide a third lane in each direction, in addition to a number of other safety upgrades being completed. Following this upgrade the speed limit was lowered from 110 kilometres per hour (68 mph) to 100 kilometres per hour (62 mph) in response to the freeway's poor safety record.

The eastern section (also known as Princes Freeway East) starts from Narre Warren, as a six-lane dual-carriageway freeway, narrowing to four lanes just west of Pakenham. There are also several highway-standard at-grade intersections, most notably between Nar Nar Goon and Longwarry. These intersections are speed limited to 100 kilometres per hour (62 mph), with the only 110 kilometres per hour (68 mph) section on the freeway from Longwarry to Morwell. However, traffic still travels through the towns of Yarragon and Trafalgar, therefore urban speed limits apply to these towns (between 60 and 80 kilometres per hour (37 and 50 mph)) where the road reverts to the Princes Highway (though planning for bypasses of these towns are underway).

The western and eastern sections are connected together through the Melbourne suburbs by West Gate Freeway, CityLink tollway and Monash Freeway. These five sections of road together constitute the route M1 through Melbourne, which is part of National Highway 1.

On the urban section of Princes Freeway (between Laverton North and Werribee), the standard travel time is 9 minutes: 6 minutes between the Western Ring Road and Forsyth Road, and 3 minutes between Forsyth Road and Duncans Road. The usual peak period travel time is between 12 and 18 minutes; however, in times of extreme congestion or traffic accidents, the travel time can well exceed 20 minutes.

== History ==
The Maltby Bypass was Victoria's first freeway which opened on 16 June 1961, and was the first section of Princes Freeway to open.

Both sections of Princes Freeway were signed National Route 1, either inheriting it when converted from older sections of Princes Highway, or assigned when newly constructed to bypass a section of it. With Victoria's conversion to the newer alphanumeric system in the late 1990s, the freeway's National Route 1 designation began conversion to M1 in late 1996, and was completed in 1997. Former bypassed sections of Princes Highway are generally signed as Metropolitan Route 83 or route C109 (western section), Alternative National Route 1 or designated successive routes from C101 to C104 (eastern section).

The passing of the Road Management Act 2004 granted the responsibility of overall management and development of Victoria's major arterial roads to VicRoads: in 2012, VicRoads re-declared the western section as Princes Freeway West (Freeway #1500) from Corio-Waurn Ponds Road in Highton to Little Boundary Road at Laverton North (this definition includes Geelong Ring Road, and in 2007, VicRoads re-declared the eastern section as Princes Freeway East (Freeway #1510) from Monash Freeway at Narre Warren to the eastern end of Princes Drive in Morwell (minus the highway section between Yarragon and Trafalgar). VicRoads also classifies a 5 km stretch of road between Newmerella and Orbost as part of Princes Freeway East, despite being a two-lane, single-carriageway road and signed as Princes Highway.

In March 2010 it was announced by the State Government that trucks would be banned from the right-hand lane along a 38-kilometre (24 mi) section of freeway between Geelong and Melbourne. Suggestions of a ban began in 2005 but increased after the fatal 2007 Burnley Tunnel fire that killed three people. The ban was put into place from 1 July 2010 between Kororoit Creek Road, Altona, and Avalon Road, Lara and covers all heavy vehicles weighing more than 4.5 tonnes (4.4 long tons; 5.0 short tons), except buses and caravans. A fine of $358 applies to those breaking the rules, the ban being a trial before a full roll-out on the other major roads in the state.

== Exits and interchanges ==
The road is divided in two distinct sections that do not meet, but are connected by West Gate Freeway, CityLink and Monash Freeway; the western section is 46 kilometres (29 mi) long, while the eastern section is 113 kilometres (70 mi) long.

=== Western section ===
LGA	Location	km	mi	Exit	Destinations	Notes
Hobsons Bay	Laverton North	0	0.0		West Gate Freeway (M1) – Melbourne, to West Gate Tunnel (M4) – Port of Melbourne	Northeastern terminus of freeway, continues east as West Gate Freeway
Hobsons Bay	Laverton North	0	0.0	W9	Geelong Road (Metro Route 83) – Brooklyn, Footscray, Parkville	
Hobsons Bay	Laverton North	0	0.0	W10	Western Ring Road (M80/Tourist Route 21) – Ardeer, Fawkner, Greensborough, Melbourne Airport	Eastern terminus of concurrency; Tourist Route 21 continues north along Western Ring Road
Hobsons Bay	Laverton	3	1.9	11	Kororoit Creek Road (Metro Route 35) – Williamstown, Tarneit	North-eastbound exit to Kororoit Creek Road eastbound only
Hobsons Bay	Laverton	4	2.5	12	Old Geelong Road (B77) – Laverton, Deer Park	North-eastbound exit only
Hobsons Bay	Altona Meadows	5.8	3.6	13	Newland Street – Altona Meadows, Laverton	South-westbound exit and entrance only
Hobsons Bay	Altona Meadows	6	3.7	13	High Street – Altona Meadows, Laverton	North-eastbound exit and entrance only
Hobsons Bay	Seabrook	7.2	4.5	14	Aviation Road (south) – Point Cook, Laverton; Central Avenue (Metro Route 41 east) – Laverton, Altona Meadows	
Hobsons Bay	Seabrook	8.2	5.1	15	Palmers Road (A91 north/B91 south) – Seabrook, Point Cook	Westbound exit and eastbound entrance only
Wyndham	Point Cook	9.3	5.8	16	Forsyth Road (A93 north) – Truganina; Boardwalk Boulevard (south) – Point Cook	
Wyndham	Point Cook	11.4	7.1	17	Princes Highway (C109 west) – Werribee; Old Geelong Road (C701 north) – Hoppers Crossing	Westbound exit, eastbound entrance and exit only
Wyndham	Point Cook	13.7	8.5	18	Sneydes Road – Werribee, Hoppers Crossing	
Wyndham	Werribee South	16.4	10.2	19	Duncans Road (C108/Tourist Route 11 north-west, south-east) – Werribee South, Werribee; K Road (Tourist Route 11 south) – Werribee Open Range Zoo	
Wyndham	Cocoroc	21	13		Geelong Road (C109 north) – Werribee; William Thwaites Drive (east) – Cocoroc	
Wyndham	Little River	29	18		Little River Road (west) – Little River; 160 South Road (east) – Cocoroc	
Wyndham	Little River	31.6	19.6		Point Wilson Road – Point Wilson	Westbound exit and eastbound entrance only
Greater Geelong	Lara	38.5	23.9		Beach Road – Point Wilson, Avalon Airport	
Greater Geelong	Lara	42.2	26.2		Avalon Road – Lara, Avalon	
Greater Geelong	Lara	45.8	28.5		Shell Parade (C115) – North Shore	Westbound exit and eastbound entrance only
Greater Geelong	Lara	45.8	28.5		Corio-Waurn Ponds Road – North Geelong, Geelong city centre, Queenscliff	Western terminus of concurrency; Tourist Route 21 continues southwest along Corio-Waurn Ponds Road
Greater Geelong	Lara	45.8	28.5		Geelong Ring Road (M1) – Colac, Warrnambool, Mount Gambier, Adelaide, to Great Ocean Road	Southwestern terminus of freeway, continues west as Geelong Ring Road
1.000 mi = 1.609 km; 1.000 km = 0.621 mi: Concurrency terminus; Incomplete access; Route transition

=== Eastern section ===
LGA	Location	km	mi	Exit	Destinations	Notes
Latrobe	Morwell	0	0.0		Princes Highway (M1) – Traralgon, Sale, Bairnsdale, Orbost, to Sydney, New South Wales	Eastern terminus of freeway, continues east as Princes Highway
Latrobe	Morwell	0	0.0		Princes Drive (C104) – Morwell	Westbound exit and eastbound entrance only
Latrobe	Morwell	2.9	1.8		Tramway Road (C474) – Morwell, Churchill	Westbound entrance and eastbound exit only
Latrobe	Morwell	3.8	2.4		Monash Way (C456) – Morwell, Churchill	
Latrobe	Morwell	5.7	3.5		Commercial Road (C475) – Morwell, Churchill	Westbound entrance; eastbound exit only
Latrobe	Morwell	8.5	5.3		Commercial Road (Strzelecki Highway) (B460) – Morwell, Mirboo North, Leongatha	
Latrobe	Morwell	9.8	6.1		Princes Drive (C104) – Morwell	Westbound exit to the north only
Latrobe	Hernes Oak	14.4	8.9		Haunted Hills Road (C471) – Yallourn North	
Latrobe	Newborough	19.5	12.1		To John Field Drive (C103) – Moe, Newborough	
Latrobe	Moe	23.9	14.9		Old Gippstown Drive (C103) – Moe	
Baw Baw	Trafalgar	32	20		Willow Grove Road (C463 north) – Willow Grove, Mount Baw Baw; Trafalgar–Thorpdale Road (C469 south) – Thorpdale	
Baw Baw	Yarragon	39.4	24.5		Yarragon–Shady Creek Road (north) – Shady Creek; Rollo Street (Yarragon–Leongatha Road) (south) – Leongatha, Mirboo North	
Baw Baw	Darnum	45.6	28.3		East–West Road/Darnum–Shady Creek Road – Darnum, Cloverlea	
Baw Baw	Nilma	48.7	30.3		Queen Street (Princes Way) (C102 west) – Warragul, to Bloomfield Road (C462) – Noojee; Nilma–Bona Vista Road (south) – Bona Vista	
Baw Baw	Warragul	50.6	31.4		Alfred Street – Warragul	Eastbound entrance only
Baw Baw	Warragul	52.2	32.4		Warragul–Korumburra Road (C425) – Korumburra, Warragul	
Baw Baw	Drouin	57.9	36.0		Princes Way (C102) – Drouin	North-westbound exit via Balfour Road
Baw Baw	Drouin	64.9	40.3		Princes Way (C102) – Drouin, Mount Baw Baw	
Baw Baw	Drouin West	70.1	43.6		Sand Road (C421) – Longwarry, Labertouche	
Cardinia	Bunyip North	73.1	45.4		Abeckett Road (south) – Bunyip; Wimpole Road (north) – Bunyip North	
Cardinia	Bunyip	75.9	47.2		Tonimbuk Road – Tonimbuk, Bunyip	
Cardinia	Garfield	78.2	48.6		Martin Road – Garfield North	
Cardinia	Garfield	78.8	49.0		Jefferson Road – Garfield	Westbound entrance and exit only
Cardinia	Garfield	79.5	49.4		Garfield Road – Garfield	
Cardinia	Garfield	79.8	49.6		Garfield North Road – Garfield North	
Cardinia	Tynong North	81.2	50.5		Brew Road (east) – Tynong North and Gumbuya Park	
Cardinia	Tynong North	82	51		Brew Road (west) – Tynong North and Gumbuya Park	
Cardinia	Tynong	84.4	52.4		Tynong North Road (north) – Tynong North and Bunyip State Park; Tynong Road (south) – Tynong	
Cardinia	Nar Nar Goon	89.6	55.7		Nar Nar Goon Connection Road (C433 south) – Nar Nar Goon; Princes Highway (C101 west) – Pakenham	
Cardinia	Pakenham	96.4	59.9	31	Koo Wee Rup Road (M420 south/C422 north) – Koo Wee Rup, Pakenham	
Cardinia	Pakenham	98	61	30	C695 McGregor Road (C695) – Rythdale, Pakenham	
Cardinia	Officer	101.6	63.1	28	Cardinia Road (C417 north, no shield south) – Cardinia, Officer	
Cardinia	Officer	104.1	64.7	27	Officer South Road – Officer, Officer South	Westbound entrance and eastbound exit only
Cardinia	Officer	105.3	65.4	26	Westbound BP Service Centre	Westbound exit and entrance only
Cardinia	Officer	105.9	65.8	26	Eastbound BP Service Centre	Eastbound exit and entrance only
Cardinia	Beaconsfield	107.6	66.9	25	O'Shea Road (A17/B668) – Beaconsfield, Hampton Park	
Casey	Berwick	110.8	68.8	24	Clyde Road (C407) – Berwick, Clyde, Cranbourne	
Casey	Narre Warren	113.4	70.5	23	Princes Highway (Alt National Route 1 west/C101 east) – Narre Warren, Berwick, Dandenong	
Casey	Narre Warren	113.4	70.5		Monash Freeway (M1) – Chadstone, Melbourne, Geelong, Melbourne Airport	Western terminus of freeway, continues northwest as Monash Freeway
1.000 mi = 1.609 km; 1.000 km = 0.621 mi: Incomplete access; Route transition

== Recent upgrades ==
=== Pakenham Bypass ===
The Pakenham Bypass was the final missing link of a continuous freeway from Melbourne to Gippsland in the East of Victoria (excluding the single sets of traffic lights in the small rural towns of Yarragon and Trafalgar). Federal and State Governments jointly funded construction of the bypass at a cost of $242 million which commenced in April 2005 and was completed on 1 December 2007. The 24 km freeway which runs from Beaconsfield to Nar Nar Goon bypasses the townships of Pakenham and Officer and provides an important link between Gippsland and Melbourne.

The new section of freeway also bypassed a small section of the original Princes Freeway at Beaconsfield, which remains as a connection between Princes Highway and the freeway known as the Princes Link Highway. The interchange between Princes Link Highway and the freeway was reconfigured as part of the O'Shea Road extension project, and was completed in 2022.

=== Geelong Ring Road ===
The Federal and State Government announced the construction of a new bypass extending 23 kilometres along Geelong's western outskirts from the Princes Freeway in Corio to the Princes Highway in Waurn Ponds. Drivers using the Bypass between Corio and Waurn Ponds will avoid up to 29 sets of traffic lights, with a travel time at freeway speeds of less than 15 minutes compared with the current 25–60 minute trip through Geelong.

The Federal Government allocated $186 million in funding with the State Government providing the remainder, giving a total of $380 million. Construction works for Section 1, between Corio and Bell Post Hill commenced in February 2006. Contracts for Section 2, between Hamlyn Heights and Fyansford, commenced in September 2006 and construction of Section 3, between Fyansford and Waurn Ponds, commenced in November 2007. All 3 stages were scheduled for completion in June 2009.

=== Duplication from Geelong to Winchelsea and Colac ===
West of Geelong, duplication of the Princes Highway between Waurn Ponds and Winchelsea commenced in 2011 and was to be completed by late 2014, though opened in May 2016 after substantially being delayed. Construction for the Winchelsea - Colac section is now underway (which began in early 2016), with both the Victorian and Australian governments contributing $515 million for this project. Once completed around 2018 and beyond, it will be an M standard road.

== Current upgrades ==
=== Duplication from Traralgon to Sale ===
Since 2010, the Princes Highway between Traralgon and Sale has progressively been duplicated and upgraded to rural freeway standard. Since 2016, the duplication has been done in three stages.

The ten sections of the duplication project now complete are:

- Traralgon East, between Traralgon–Maffra Road and Stammers Road; construction began in February 2010 and opened in late 2010
- Traralgon East, between Stammers Road and Minniedale Road; construction began in July 2013 and opened in February 2015
- Traralgon East, between Minniedale Road and Sheepwash Creek Road (Stage 1); construction began in December 2016 and opened in December 2018
- Flynn, between Sheepwash Creek Road and Flynn Creek Road (Stage 3); construction began in July 2021 and opened in July 2023
- Flynn to Rosedale, between Flynn Creek Road and Cricket Street; construction began in March 2014 and opened in November 2016
- Rosedale to Nambrok (Stage 1), between Dennison Road and Nambrok Road; construction began in December 2013 and opened in April 2015
- Nambrok (Stage 2), between Nambrok Road and Maffra–Rosedale Road; construction began in February 2017 and opened in December 2018
- Fulham (Stage 2), from Sale–Cowwarr Road to Sale–Heyfield Road; construction began in mid 2016 and opened in December 2017
- Fulham to Wurruk (Stage 1), between Sale–Heyfield Road and Wurruk;
- Wurruk to Sale; opened in late 2012

The remaining section of Stage 3, which started construction in July 2021 and expected completion in 2024 is:

- Kilmany, between Maffra–Rosedale Road and Sale–Cowwarr Road (linking Nambrok Stage 2 to Fulham Stage 2)

== Future upgrades ==
=== Princes Highway East ===
==== Nar Nar Goon to Longwarry North upgrade ====
Proposed safety and grade separation improvements, Princes Freeway East – Nar Nar Goon to Longwarry North, to be funded in future.

==== Traralgon Bypass ====
In 2009, VicRoads with Latrobe City Council completed a planning project for the Traralgon Bypass. Four options were put to the public, with Option 2 chosen as the preferred route. This route was formalised in the Latrobe Planning Scheme thereafter. In August 2017, the State Government announced $1.4 million towards further planning of the Traralgon Bypass.

As of 2023, the bypass is dependent on additional state and federal government funding for detailed planning and construction to proceed.

=== Princes Highway West ===
==== Winchelsea and Colac Bypass ====
Bypasses of Winchelsea and Colac as well as possible duplication of the Princes Hwy from Colac to Warrnambool, to be funded in future.

== See also ==
- Freeways in Victoria
- Geelong Ring Road
- West Gate Freeway
- Monash Freeway
- CityLink
- Highway 1 (Victoria)
- Highway 1 (Australia)
