= Tynong =

- Town
- Interactive map of Tynong
- Coordinates: 38.083333°S 145.616667°E
- Country: Australia
- State: Victoria
- LGA: Shire of Cardinia
- Location: 66 km (41 mi) from Melbourne; 29 km (18 mi) from Berwick

Government
  - State electorate: Narracan
  - Federal division: La Trobe
- Elevation: 135 m (443 ft)

Population
  - Total: 523 (2021 census)
- Postcode: 3813
Localities around Tynong
| Nar Nar Goon North | Tynong North | Garfield North |
| Nar Nar Goon | Tynong | Garfield |
| Cora Lynn | Cora Lynn | Iona |

Tynong is a town in Gippsland, Victoria, Australia, 66 km south-east of Melbourne's Central Business District, located within the Shire of Cardinia local government area. Tynong recorded a population of 523 at the 2021 census.

Tynong was settled in the early 1880s and the Post Office opened on 1 November 1882.

Places of interest include Gumbuya World, Pakenham Racecourse, Mill Valley Ranch and Tynong railway station.

Tynong is notable for the granodiorite quarried from the area for the construction of the Melbourne Shrine of Remembrance.

== See also ==
- Shire of Pakenham – Tynong was previously within this former local government area.
