= Tynong North =

Coordinates: 38°05′S 145°37′E

- Town
- Interactive map of Tynong North
- Country: Australia
- State: Victoria
- LGA: Shire of Cardinia
- Location: 63 km (39 mi) from Melbourne; 29 km (18 mi) from Berwick

Government
  - State electorate: Narracan
  - Federal division: La Trobe
- Elevation: 135 m (443 ft)

Population
  - Total: 440 (2021 census)
- Postcode: 3813
Localities around Tynong North
Maryknoll	Garfield North	Garfield North
Nar Nar Goon North	Tynong North	Garfield North
Nar Nar Goon	Tynong	Garfield

Tynong North is a locality in West Gippsland, Victoria, Australia, 63 kilometres (39 mi) south-east of Melbourne's Central Business District, located within the Shire of Cardinia local government area. Tynong North recorded a population of 440 at the 2021 census.

Tynong North is separated from Tynong by the Princes Freeway, which runs between the two settlements. The localities are further distinguished geographically with Tynong being situated on the edge of a reclaimed swamp while Tynong North sits at the foot of the mountains in the Weatherhead Range, and is adjacent to Bunyip State Park and the Weatherhead Forest Reserve.

Places of interest include Gumbuya World, Mill Valley Ranch, the old Cornucopia Museum (which is under renovation) and the Fulton Hogan Pty Ltd (previously Astec) Quarry.

Tynong North Post Office opened on 14 May 1934 and closed in 1964.

== Sport and Leisure ==
Tynong North borders the Bunyip State Park which features numerous horse riding tracks. Horse riding lessons are also available from local trainers.

== See also ==
- Shire of Pakenham – Tynong North was previously within this former local government area.
