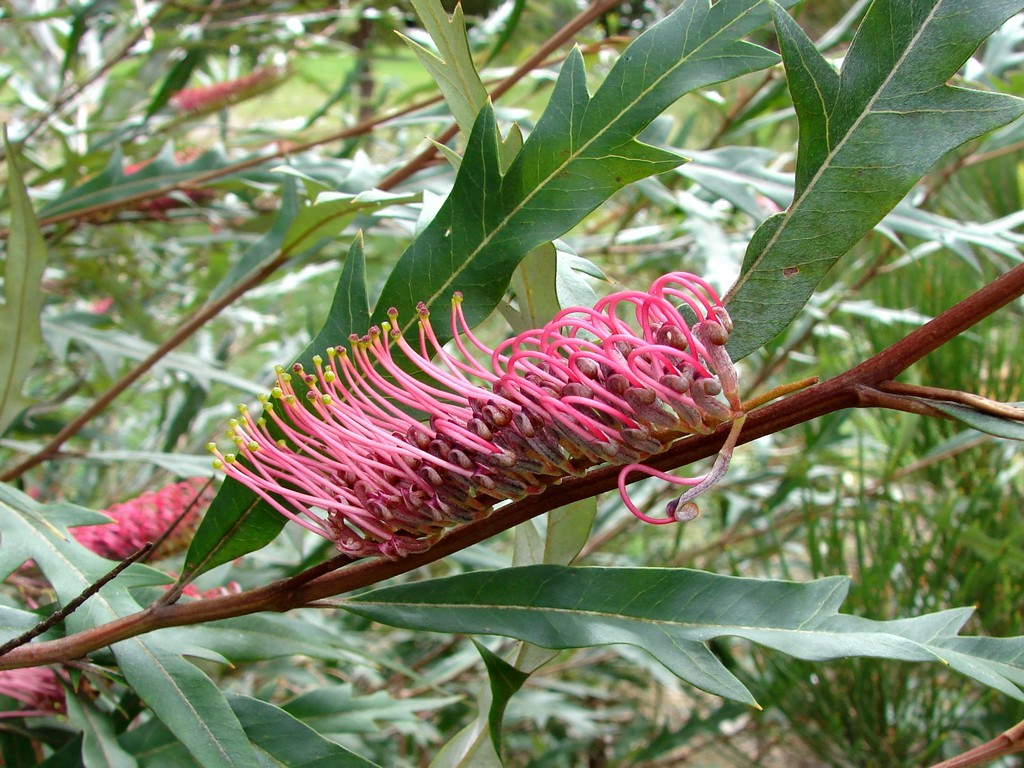
- A hybrid of Grevillea barklyana

Scientific classification
- Kingdom: Plantae
- Clade: Embryophytes
- Clade: Tracheophytes
- Clade: Spermatophytes
- Clade: Angiosperms
- Clade: Eudicots
- Order: Proteales
- Family: Proteaceae
- Genus: Grevillea
- Species: G. barklyana

Binomial name
- Grevillea barklyana F.Muell. ex Benth.

Synonyms
- Grevillea barklyana F.Muell. nom. inval., nom. nud. (1861); Grevillea barklyana F.Muell. ex Benth. subsp. barklyana

= Grevillea barklyana =

Species of tree endemic to Victoria, Australia

Grevillea barklyana, also known as gully grevillea or large-leaf grevillea, is a species of flowering plant in the family Proteaceae and is endemic to Western Gippsland in Victoria, Australia. It is an erect shrub or small tree, with mostly pinnatifid leaves with two to eleven lobes, and whitish pink to fawn flowers.

== Description ==
Grevillea barklyana is an erect shrub or small tree that typically grows to a height of up to 10 m (33 ft). Its leaves are mostly pinnatifid, narrowly egg-shaped to elliptic in outline, 50–270 mm (2.0–10.6 in) long and 25–120 mm (0.98–4.72 in) wide with two to eleven lobes 10–40 mm (0.39–1.57 in) long, the lower surface densely covered with curly hairs. The flowers are arranged in groups near the ends of branches on a rachis 50–100 mm (2.0–3.9 in) long, and are whitish pink to fawn with a glabrous, pale pink to pale crimson style. The pistil is 18.5–28.5 mm (0.73–1.12 in) long and covered with silky to woolly hairs. Flowering mostly occurs from October to December and the fruit is a follicle 13.5–17 mm (0.53–0.67 in) long.

== Taxonomy ==
Grevillea barklyana was first formally described in 1870 by George Bentham in Flora Australiensis from an unpublished description by Ferdinand von Mueller. Mueller had previously published the name in 1861 in the Votes and Proceedings of the Legislative Assembly of Victoria, but the name was a nomen nudum. The specific epithet honours Sir Henry Barkly who was Governor of Victoria between 1856 and 1863.

In 1986 Donald McGillivray described two subspecies, barklyana and macleayana, but in 1994, Peter M. Olde and Neil R. Marriott raised subspecies macleayana to species level as Grevillea macleayana and that name is accepted by the Australian Plant Census.

== Distribution and habitat ==
Gully grevillea occurs in the upper catchments of the Bunyip and Tarago Rivers within the Bunyip State Park and adjoining State Forest. It is found in gullies and on slopes, favouring a southerly aspect and clay-loam soils that are moist but well drained. Associated tree species include Acacia dealbata, Eucalyptus obliqua, E. sieberi and E. regnans. As plants do not store seed in their canopies and are not able to resprout, it is necessary for a soil seed reserve to be established to enable them to regenerate following bushfires.

== Conservation ==
The Labertouche Wildflower Reserve was created in 1963 to protect a significant population of gully grevillea as well as forest boronia (Boronia muelleri) and grasstree (Xanthorrhoea australis). The reserve was included within the Bunyip State Park which was gazetted in 1992. Approximately half of the known populations of the species occur within the boundaries of the park.

The species is currently listed as critically endangered in Victoria under the Flora and Fauna Guarantee Act 1988 threatened species list.

== Use in horticulture ==
Although G. barklyana is regarded as a desirable plant for cultivation, it is not widely available in nurseries. It is grown for its bird-attracting pink flowers, ornamental foliage and contrasting reddish new growth. The species can cope with heavy shade and has some frost tolerance. As it has a weak root system, plants are best situated where they are afforded wind protection by other planting. Propagation is by cuttings or seed.
