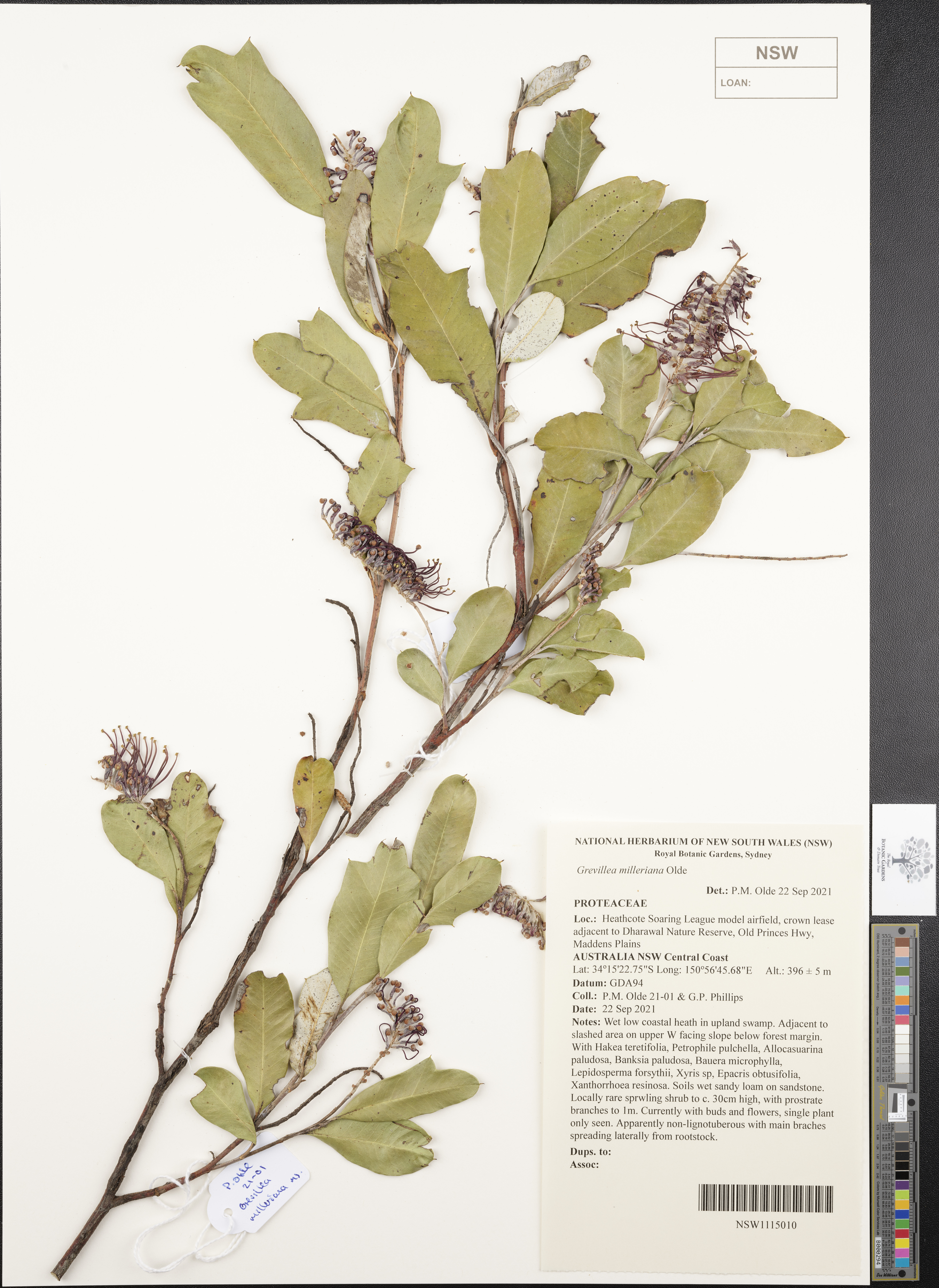
- Holotype specimen

Scientific classification
- Kingdom: Plantae
- Clade: Tracheophytes
- Clade: Angiosperms
- Clade: Eudicots
- Order: Proteales
- Family: Proteaceae
- Genus: Grevillea
- Species: G. milleriana

Binomial name
- Grevillea milleriana Olde

= Grevillea milleriana =

Species of shrub endemic to Australia

Grevillea milleriana is a flowering plant in the family Proteaceae native to a restricted distribution in the Maddens Plains area in New South Wales, Australia. It is currently only known from the holotype specimen.

== Description ==
Grevillea milleriana is a low, spreading, sub-prostrate shrub which typically grows up to 30 cm (12 in) high and 50 cm (20 in) wide, with the lowest branches trailing along the ground. The leaves are 50–85 mm (2.0–3.3 in) long and 15–35 mm (0.59–1.38 in) wide and are either lobed or entire with up to 8 broadly triangular lobes. The upper surface of the leaves is glabrous or nearly so and the lower surface of the leaves is silky hairy. The flowers are arranged in groups near the ends of branches, 35–45 mm (1.4–1.8 in) long and about 15 mm (0.59 in) wide on a peduncle 5–12 mm (0.20–0.47 in) long, each flower on a pedicel 3.25–3.50 mm (0.128–0.138 in) long. The perianth is 6–7 mm (0.24–0.28 in) long, pink outside and purplish-pink inside with a brown, limb 1.25–1.8 mm (0.049–0.071 in) long. The style is glabrous and the pollen-presenter is 1.2–1.5 mm (0.047–0.059 in) long and wide.

=== Similar species ===
Grevillea milleriana is closely related to G. barklyana, G. macleayana and G. gilmourii, another species described in the same year. It can be distinguished from its relatives by its low, spreading habit, its longer pedicels (3.25–3.50 mm (0.128–0.138 in) long and shorter anthers 0.5 mm (0.020 in) long.

== Taxonomy ==
Grevillea milleriana was first formally described by Peter M. Olde in the journal Telopea from specimens collected near Maddens Plains in 2021. The specific epithet (milleriana) honours the discoverers of the species, R. T. Miller and Janice Miller. The holotype was previously misidentified as a disjunct population of G. caleyi, a species which only occurs within the Terrey Hills region north of Sydney.
