= Maryknoll, Victoria =

Coordinates: 38°01′55″S 145°36′07″E

Maryknoll
- Town
- Interactive map of Maryknoll
- Country: Australia
- State: Victoria
- LGA: Shire of Cardinia
- Location: 61 km (38 mi) from Melbourne; 32 km (20 mi) from Berwick
- Established: 1950

Government
  - State electorate: Narracan
  - Federal division: La Trobe

Population
  - Total: 646 (2021 census)
- Postcode: 3812
Localities around Maryknoll
| Nar Nar Goon North | Tonimbuk | Garfield North |
| Nar Nar Goon North | Maryknoll | Tynong North |
| Nar Nar Goon | Nar Nar Goon | Tynong North |

Maryknoll is a town in Victoria, Australia, 61 km south-east of Melbourne's Central Business District, located within the Shire of Cardinia local government area. Maryknoll recorded a population of 646 at the 2021 census.

Maryknoll lies adjacent to Bunyip State Park, and is one of the youngest towns established in the Shire of Cardinia.

== History ==
Father Wilfrid Pooley of the Catholic Church envisaged a new 600-acre (2.4 km^{2}) religious intentional community in West Gippsland where residents could live rural lifestyles ideal for the raising of families and practice of the Catholic faith. The name Maryknoll replaced the original name of St Mary's in 1955, and the Maryknoll Post Office opened on 3 October 1955. The original settlement consisted of about 30 families.

By the mid-1980s, the Maryknoll cooperative society formally closed. This had been an economic society, not connected with the social make-up of the community. Restriction of residents to Catholics had not been implemented since the 1960s.

Father Pooley and Des O'Connell were founders of Maryknoll. Pooley was the leader of the community and lived in Maryknoll until he moved to the presbytery of Iona when the two parishes were combined. He died in 1968, and O'Connell died 2017 at 102 years of age.

== Facilities ==
Facilities include a CFA, community hall, Catholic Church, milk-bar and recreation reserve which contains Maryknoll Tennis Club and Nar Nar Goon-Maryknoll Cricket Club. Numerous forested parks and walking tracks are scattered throughout the locality. Maryknoll no longer has a school, with children often commuting to Pakenham, Warragul, Drouin or other places for education. Maryknoll also has a lawn cemetery.

== Flora and fauna ==
Maryknoll is abundantly covered in forest, with eucalypts, wattles, banksias and sheoaks being common species. Ferns, pittosporum and introduced species can also be found, and types of rare orchids have been discovered in the area. Kangaroos, wombats and possums are very common native species, and koalas have been occasionally sighted.

== See also ==
- Shire of Pakenham – Maryknoll was previously within this former local government area.
