= Tarago River =

Tarago
- Mouth of the Tarago River in Victoria

Location
- Country: Australia
- State: Victoria
- Region: South East Coastal Plain (IBRA), West Gippsland
- Local government area: Baw Baw

Physical characteristics
- Source: Gentle Annie Camp, Yarra Ranges
  - location: Bunyip State Park
  - coordinates: 37°53′43″S 145°40′27″E
  - elevation: 358 m (1,175 ft)
- Mouth: confluence with the Bunyip River
  - location: north of Bunyip
  - coordinates: 38°6′3″S 145°44′20″E
  - elevation: 38 m (125 ft)
- Length: 49 km (30 mi)

Basin features
- River system: Western Port catchment
- Tributaries
  - left: Muddy Creek (Victoria)
  - right: Labertouche Creek, Bunyip River

The Tarago River is a perennial river of the Western Port catchment, in the West Gippsland region of the Australian state of Victoria.

== Location and features ==
The Tarago River rises near Gentle Annie Camp, part of the south-eastern portion of the Yarra Ranges within the Bunyip State Park, near Bunyip Gap. The river flows generally east then south, then west by south, then west, then south, joined by two minor tributaries and the Bunyip River, before being channeled to form the Main Drain. From here the river flows through a series of urban concrete culverts in a south-westerly direction, emptying into the Western Port, southwest of Koo-Wee-Rup. The river descends approximately 320 metres (1,050 ft) over its 49 kilometres (30 mi) course, prior to entering the Main Drain.

At the confluence of the Tarago and Bunyip Rivers, the rivers are traversed by the Princes Freeway, north of the locality of Bunyip. The South Gippsland Highway traverses the Main Drain near its river mouth, emptying into the Western Port.

== See also ==
- List of rivers of Australia § Victoria
