= Tarago Reservoir =

Dam and reservoir in Victoria, Australia

Tarago Dam
- Location of the dam in Victoria
- Interactive map of Tarago Dam
- Country: Australia
- Location: Gippsland, Victoria
- Coordinates: 38°01′14″S 145°56′12″E
- Purpose: Water supply
- Status: Operational
- Opening date: 1969; 1971 (enlarged); 2009 (reconnected)
- Operator: Melbourne Water

Dam and spillways
- Type of dam: Rock-fill dam
- Impounds: Tarago River
- Height: 34 m (112 ft)
- Length: 300 m (980 ft)
- Dam volume: 326×10^{3} m^{3} (11.5×10^{6} cu ft)
- Spillway type: Uncontrolled
- Spillway capacity: 545 m^{3}/s (19,200 cu ft/s)

Reservoir
- Creates: Tarago Reservoir
- Total capacity: 37,580 ML (30,470 acre⋅ft)
- Catchment area: 114 km^{2} (44 sq mi)
- Surface area: 360 ha (890 acres)
- Normal elevation: 153 m (502 ft) AHD

The Tarago Dam is a rock-filled embankment dam across the Tarago River, located near Neerim South, approximately 100 kilometres (62 mi) east of Melbourne, in the Gippsland region of Victoria, Australia. Completed in 1969, the eponymous reservoir, Tarago Reservoir, was completed to supply potable water. Disconnected from the supply network in 1994 due to water quality issues, the reservoir was subsequently upgraded and reconnected in 2009, following the establishment of a water treatment facility.

The dam and reservoir are operated by Melbourne Water.

== Dam and reservoir overview ==
The rock-filled dam wall is 34 metres (112 ft) high and 300 metres (980 ft) long. When full, the resultant reservoir has a storage capacity of 37,570 megalitres (30,460 acre⋅ft) and covers 873 hectares (2,160 acres), drawn from a catchment area of 113 square kilometres (44 sq mi). The uncontrolled spillway has a discharge capacity of 545 cubic metres per second (19,200 cu ft/s) and the dam wall was raised in 1974.

=== Reservoir ===
The reservoir was built in 1969 to supply water to towns near Neerim South, the Mornington Peninsula and Westernport regions. In 1994, Melbourne Water stopped using water from the reservoir as it had become unsuitable for drinking. Although it continued to be used for local water supplies, the reservoir was reconnected to the metropolitan water supply system in June 2009 following the construction of a water treatment plant.

== See also ==
- List of reservoirs and dams in Victoria
