= Pakenham East =

- Suburb
- Coordinates: 38.0637°S 145.5266°E
- Country: Australia
- State: Victoria
- City: Melbourne
- LGA: Shire of Cardinia
- Location: 56.9 km (35.4 mi) from Melbourne GPO

Government
  - State electorates: Narracan; Pakenham
  - Federal division: La Trobe
- Postcode: 3810
Suburbs around Pakenham East
Pakenham	Nar Nar Goon North	Nar Nar Goon North
Pakenham	Pakenham East	Nar Nar Goon
Pakenham	Pakenham	Nar Nar Goon

Pakenham East is a proposed suburb of the Greater Melbourne metropolitan area situated south-east of Melbourne City. It will be located in the Shire of Cardinia local government area. It is planned to be named Honora Fields, pending approval by the Geographic Names Victoria.

== History ==
Pakenham East is situated in the Kulin nation traditional Aboriginal country. The Boonwurrung people are local custodians within the Kulin nation. The origin of the name Pakenham is from Sir Edward Pakenham and the geographic position east of the Pakenham main settlement.

The Pakenham East precinct structure plan (PSP) was submitted by the Victorian Planning Authority (VPA) in October 2018. The precinct was approved on 2 January 2021. As of February 2025, the area is in the suburbs of Pakenham and Nar Nar Goon. Council has claimed that the PSP will deliver around 7,000 new homes and supporting infrastructure.

A new suburb was proposed to be designated and cover the PSP area. In August 2024, Council announced that the suburb name will be Honora Fields, which pays name to Honora Carney, a Cardinia Shire local whose family has significant ties to the area dating back to 1869. This was following a 5-week community consultation period during which the name "Honora" received the highest number of votes from the community. To comply with naming conventions set by Geographic Names Victoria (GNV), the suffix "Fields" was added to reflect the area's agricultural heritage.

=== Naming dispute ===
In September 2024, Councillor Stephanie Davies accused the Cardinia Shire Council of failing to follow due process in the selection of the name Honora, and claimed that they changed the rating system from the public consultation period, behind closed doors, to favour the Honora name. She also discovered that a member of the Carney family is an employee of the council, noting a potential conflict of interest. The council denied any wrongdoing and also denied that the employee from the Carney family had any involvement in the choice of the suburb name. An investigation is still ongoing as of February 2025.

In March 2025, after a referral by Councillor Davies, the Independent Broad-based Anti-corruption Commission (IBAC) reportedly chose not to investigate the case due to a lack of evidence of corruption. In July, the Local Government Inspectorate concluded its investigation and determined that there was no conflict of interest by Cardinia Shire in the choice of the suburb name. The council submitted the formal request to GNV to rename the suburb "Honora Fields" the following month.

In September 2025, Davies escalated the matter to the Supreme Court of Victoria, requesting an injunction to block the council's submission of the name to GNV, as well as a review of the process undertaken by the council to select the name. The injunction was rejected, but a trial is expected to take place in August 2026. In June 2026, GNV ordered the council to carry out a new round of consultation to survey the public's opinion on the Honora Fields name specifically, which began in July.

== Geography ==
The Pakenham East PSP precinct would consist of an area of 6.3 km^{2} (2.4 sq mi) of land generally bounded by Deep Creek and Ryan Road to the west, Mount Ararat North Road to the east, and the Princes Freeway to the south. The proposed suburb area will cover the precinct along with some area around it, with the existing electricity transmission easement forming the northern boundary.

== Development ==
Development in Pakenham East would include a town centre, residential, educational facilities, parks and recreation, sporting facilities, as well as cycling paths and pedestrian infrastructure.

== Transport ==
Pakenham East is situated along the Princes Highway east of the Pakenham main settlement. The suburb is served by the East Pakenham railway station in adjacent Pakenham, which opened in 2024.
