= Garfield, Victoria =

Garfield
- Town
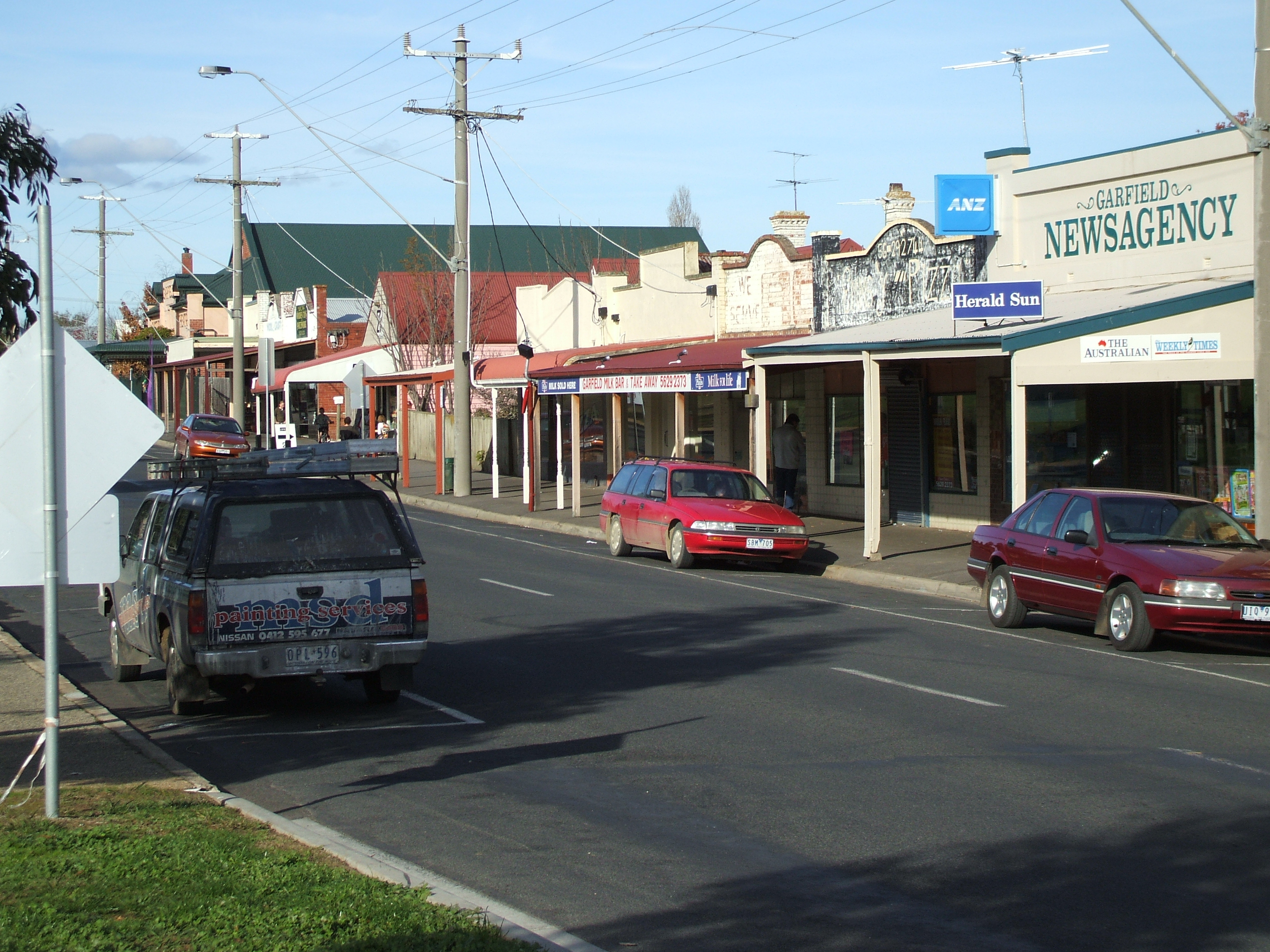
- Main street

- Interactive map of Garfield
- Coordinates: 38°04′S 145°41′E
- Country: Australia
- State: Victoria
- LGA: Shire of Cardinia
- Location: 79 km (49 mi) SE of Melbourne; 21 km (13 mi) E of Drouin; 7 km (4.3 mi) E of Bunyip

Government
  - State electorate: Narracan
  - Federal division: La Trobe

Population
  - Total: 2,114 (2021 census)
- Postcode: 3814
Localities around Garfield
Tynong North	Garfield North	Garfield North
Tynong	Garfield	Bunyip
Cora Lynn	Iona	Iona

Garfield is a town in Victoria, Australia, 79 km south-east of Melbourne's Central Business District, located within the Shire of Cardinia local government area. Garfield recorded a population of 2,114 at the 2021 census.

== History ==
The area was originally called Cannibal Creek, but was renamed to Garfield in memory of the U.S. President James A. Garfield, who was murdered in July 1881.

The Post Office opened as Cannibal Creek on 1 May 1886 and was renamed Garfield in 1887, though this had not been the first choice of the local community.

== Garfield today ==
Garfield has a primary school with approximately 150 students. There is a church at the top end of the schoolgrounds. Local businesses include a newsagency, a sourdough bakery, women’s clothing shop, an opportunity shop, gifts and homewares shop, butcher, hairdressers, and several cafes.

It is also home to the Garfield Picture Theatre, Cardinia Shire’s first cinema in the region. The theatre was built in 1924, and was the town’s first source of electricity. Today, it’s one of the few picture theatre buildings remaining in the shire and hosts monthly concerts.

The town has an Australian Rules football team playing in the Ellinbank and District Football League. Garfield has an undulating golf course on Thirteen Mile Road run by the Garfield Golf Club.

As at 2021, the population of Garfield was 2,114 (50.6% male, 49.4% female). The median age was 39.

Garfield hosts two annual community festivals: the Garfield Christmas Festival in December, and the West Gippsland Railtowns Food and Wine Festival in March. Both events bring thousands of visitors to the town to enjoy local food and entertainment.

== Gallery ==
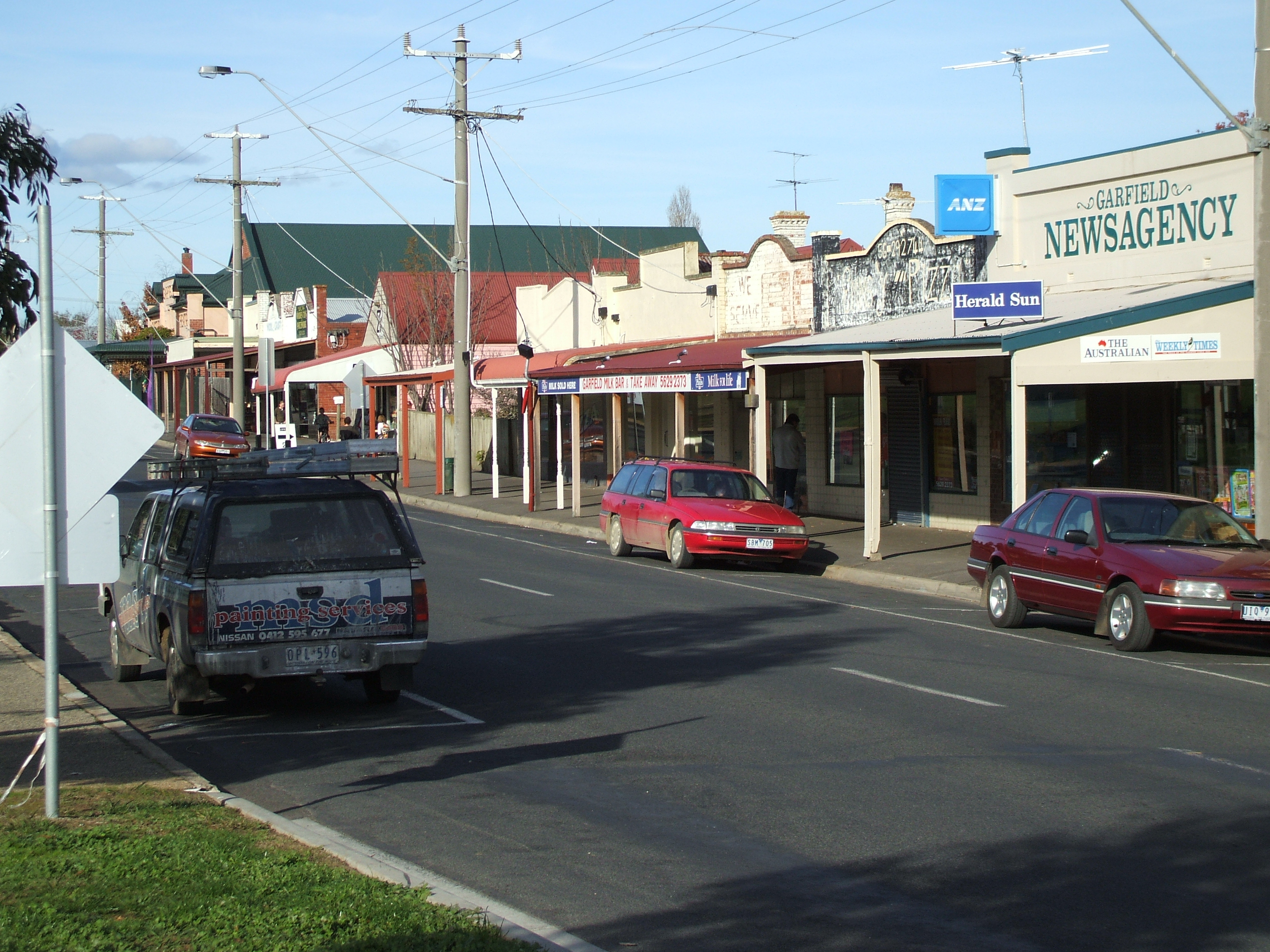
Main street

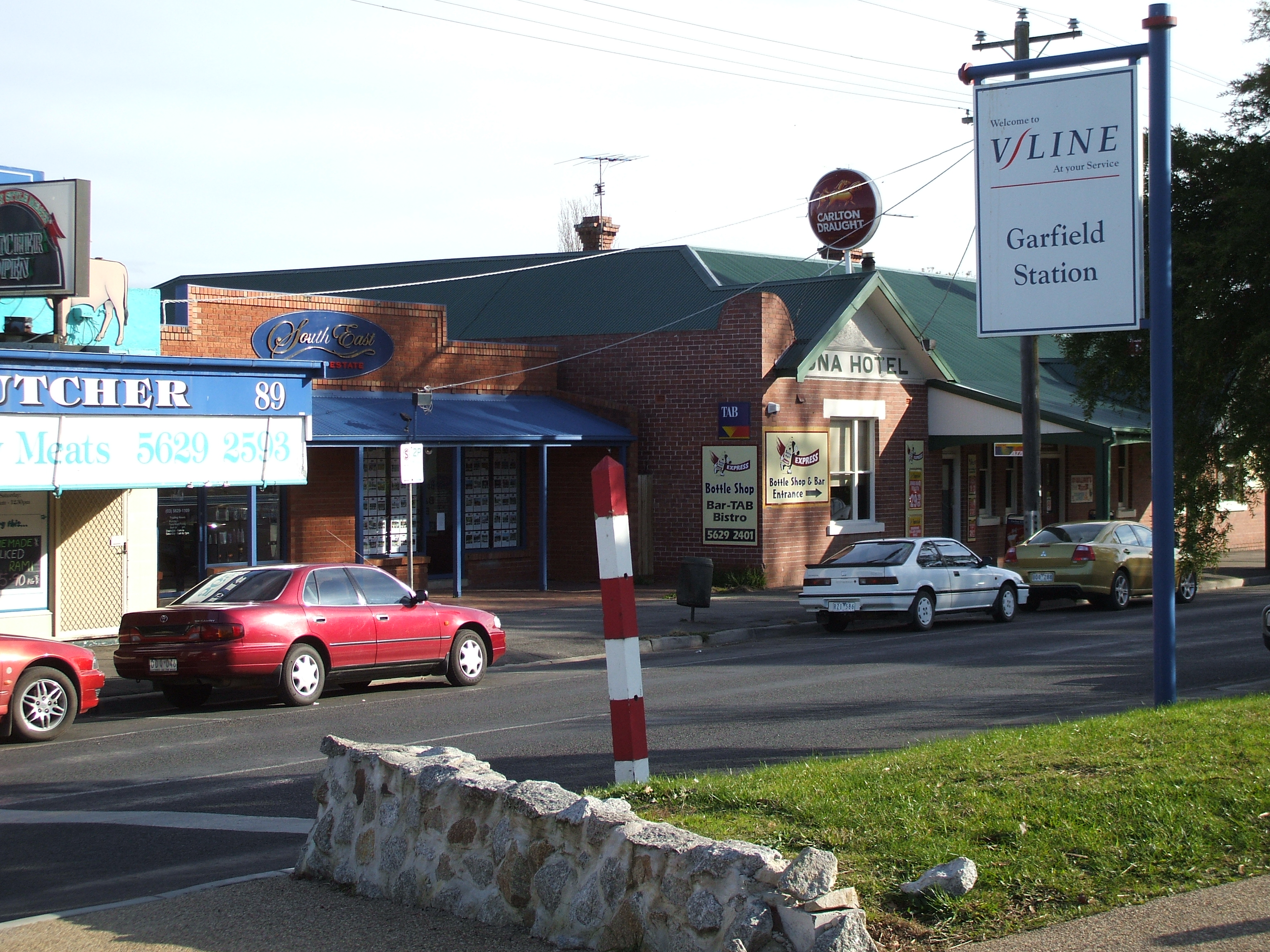
Iona Hotel

== See also ==
- Shire of Pakenham – Garfield was previously within this former local government area.
- Garfield railway station
