= Bunyip River =

Bunyip Main Drain, Buneep, Bunnip
- Mouth of the Bunyip River in Victoria
- Etymology: Bunyip: from Aboriginal mythology
- Native name: Banib (Boonwurrung)

Location
- Country: Australia
- State: Victoria
- Region: South East Coastal Plain (IBRA), West Gippsland
- Local government area: Cardinia

Physical characteristics
- Source: Mount Beenak, Yarra Ranges
  - location: near Tomahawk Gap
  - coordinates: 37°53′43″S 145°40′27″E
  - elevation: 477 m (1,565 ft)
- Mouth: confluence with the Tarago River to form the Main Drain
  - location: north of Bunyip
  - coordinates: 38°4′55″S 145°45′13″E
  - elevation: 40 m (130 ft)
- Length: 27 km (17 mi)

Basin features
- River system: Western Port catchment
- Tributaries
  - left: Tea Tree Creek, Ryson Creek
  - right: Back Creek (Victoria), Diamond Creek (Cardinia, Victoria), Cannibal Creek
- Nature reserve: Bunyip State Park

The Bunyip River is a perennial river of the Western Port catchment, in the West Gippsland region of the Australian state of Victoria.

== Location and features ==
The Bunyip River rises below Mount Beenak, part of the southern portion of the Yarra Ranges within the Bunyip State Park, near Tomahawk Gap, and flows generally south by east then south, at times via an aqueduct, joined by four minor tributaries, before reaching its confluence with the Tarago River to form the Main Drain. From there, the river used to flow into the Koo-Wee-Rup Swamp, the largest wetland in Victoria, covering an area of 40,000 hectares (98,842 acres), before flowing into Western Port. The river descends approximately 437 metres (1,434 ft) over its 27 kilometres (17 mi) course.

At the confluence of the Bunyip and Tarago Rivers, the rivers are traversed by the Princes Freeway, north of the locality of Bunyip.

== Etymology ==
In the Aboriginal Boonwurrung language, the name for the river is Banib, meaning "a fabulous, large, black amphibious monster".

The river is named after the bunyip, an Aboriginal mythological and legendary character from lakes and swamps.

== See also ==
- List of rivers of Australia
