= Light Horse & Field Artillery Museum =

Australian military museum

Coordinates: 38.052028°S 145.569792°E

The Light Horse & Field Artillery Museum is an Australian military museum located approximately 1 hour south-east of Melbourne in Nar Nar Goon, Victoria. It contains a number of exhibits of military items including gun carriages and cooking wagons restored by owner Bernie Dingle. It also has a number of animals, including horses used in Anzac Day marches.

In 2015 it was closed to the public due to a building order from Cardinia Council, which in 2014 had ordered upgrades costing $80,000 - $100,000 including large water tanks, a sprinkler system and other changes.
