= Bunyip, Victoria =

Bunyip
- Town
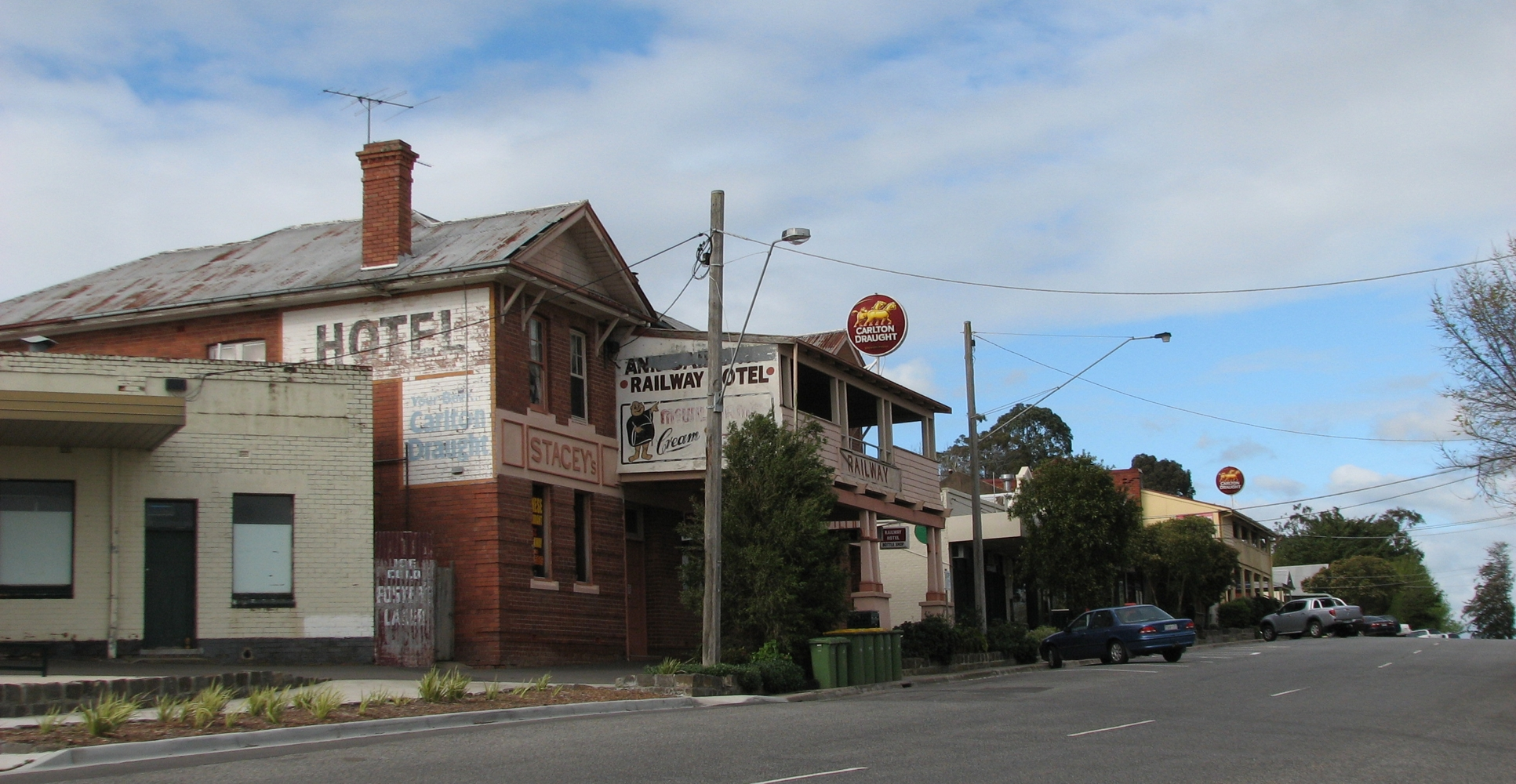
- Main Street

- Interactive map of Bunyip
- Coordinates: 38°05′S 145°43′E
- Country: Australia
- State: Victoria
- LGA: Shire of Cardinia
- Location: 81 km (50 mi) SE of Melbourne; 24 km (15 mi) E of Pakenham; 18 km (11 mi) W of Drouin
- Established: 1840

Government
  - State electorate: Narracan
  - Federal division: La Trobe
- Elevation: 85 m (279 ft)

Population
  - Total: 3,131 (2021 census)
- Postcode: 3815
Localities around Bunyip
| Garfield North | Tonimbuk | Labertouche |
| Garfield | Bunyip | Longwarry |
| Cora Lynn | Iona | Iona |

Bunyip is a town in Gippsland, Victoria, Australia, 81 km south-east of the Melbourne central business district, located within the Shire of Cardinia local government area. Bunyip recorded a population of 3,131 at the 2021 census.

Its major road connection is via the Princes Highway.

The town is named after a mythical creature, known as the Bunyip, which according to legend lived in and around swampy areas. Mention of it is often found in Australian and Aboriginal mythology.

== History ==
=== Before European settlement ===
The Koo-Wee-Rup and Bunyip areas, among others, are considered to be places of importance to many Aboriginal people in Victoria, particularly the Bunurong people of the Kulin nation, the traditional owners of the area, from whom the word Bunyeep is derived. They believe the Bunyip is a spiritual being which lives near water and preys on humans who come too near.

=== 1800-1850 ===
The Kooweerup Swamp comprised a region of some 6,000 acres (24 km^{2}) stretching from Sawtells Inlet on Westernport Bay to the township of Bunyip in the north-east. The marsh like area was formed by the waters of the many rivers which flow down from the surrounding high country and which often created impenetrable swamplands.

The first settlers had great difficulty in cultivating the land because of the dense stands of giant Melaleuca, or tea-tree, large Eucalyptus and Acacia melanoxylon, or blackwood trees, which lay under the surface. In 1827 William Hovell attempted to cross the swamp but found the scrub to be an impenetrable wilderness. He was impressed by the country, and those areas which were workable held some promise for future development.

Europeans with a view to settlement first arrived in the area around 1840 and established the Buneep Run. A report in 1847 by the surveyor and Commissioner of Crown Lands, Charles Tyers, confirmed the earlier findings but no major drainage works were attempted until decades later.

In 1847, a road was surveyed through virgin forest to "Buneep", as the area was known by its indigenous inhabitants, which enabled travellers to follow a track that led further east into Gippsland. The survey showed a building, 'Andersons', at the future site of Bunyip.

=== 1850-1900 ===
In December 1857 the Buneep Run was surveyed with a view to establishing a village on the Melbourne to Sale Road and Messrs. Connor, Vale and McKinnon purchased most of the allotments in the area. This site was between the Bunyip River and the present Ellis Road (referred to now as Tonimbuk) north-east of the current town. Connor built the old "Buneep Hotel" around 1858 to accommodate coach travellers on the long route, a journey that usually took 36 hours. The names recorded in this era for the old town included Buneep, Burneep Burneep and Burra Burneep. At around the same time and in the same area the transport company Cobb and Co established their own trading post.

In 1859, a new road, later known as the Old Telegraph Road was surveyed in an attempt to avoid the bad conditions of the previous route to Sale. But, in 1860 there were further improvements made for coach traffic with the opening of the Old Sale Road which crossed the Bunyip River three miles (4.8 km) to the south of the old Buneep village, which was abandoned around this time.

In 1867 David Connor selected land to build the "Bunyip Hotel" on the west side of the Bunyip River along the new road. The licensee was David Devaney and the hotel had 14 rooms as well as a 25 stall stable.

Located on a low hill some 44 metres above sea-level, a township was established in its final location alongside the Gippsland railway line when it arrived in October 1877. By March of the following year the section of the line to Moe was completed. Surrounded partly by swamp as it was, the foundation of the town, and railway line, can be attributed to its relatively elevated position, its prior use as a coach stop and the increasing need to provide transport for farm produce and timber.

Two hotels, the "Butcher's Arms" and the "Bunyip" were set up in 1876 while the railway line was under construction and in 1877 the "Railway Family" hotel opened with John O'Brien as its licensee. The establishment of these hotels was permanent. The Post Office opened around November 1877 and was known as Bunyip R. S. until 1903.

The main outlet for the men looking for work was in the timber industry and local splitters were fully employed having orders to keep them in work for many months. Large eucalyptus trees were selected and were then sawn with a cross cut saw into required lengths. Palings were used for weatherboards, garden fences and roof shingling. Although a number of private attempts were made at drainage works in the 1860s and 70s they were met with little success.

In 1887, in addition to the hotels there was also a general store, three or four dwellings and a state school. It took another year for speculators to arrive in the district looking for land and it was about this time that development, and suitable drainage work started on the large swampy land nearby. By 1900 the town included a large produce, livestock and furniture market, opened by Ernest Witton in 1895. And, as the area was becoming more prosperous, a petition was prepared in April 1899 to ask the Bank of Australasia to establish an agency in Bunyip and to send an officer two days a week.

=== 1900-1950 ===
The township of Bunyip grew slowly in its early years, but by the turn of the century there were more businesses than houses, and these served the people in the surrounding agricultural districts as well as the local township.

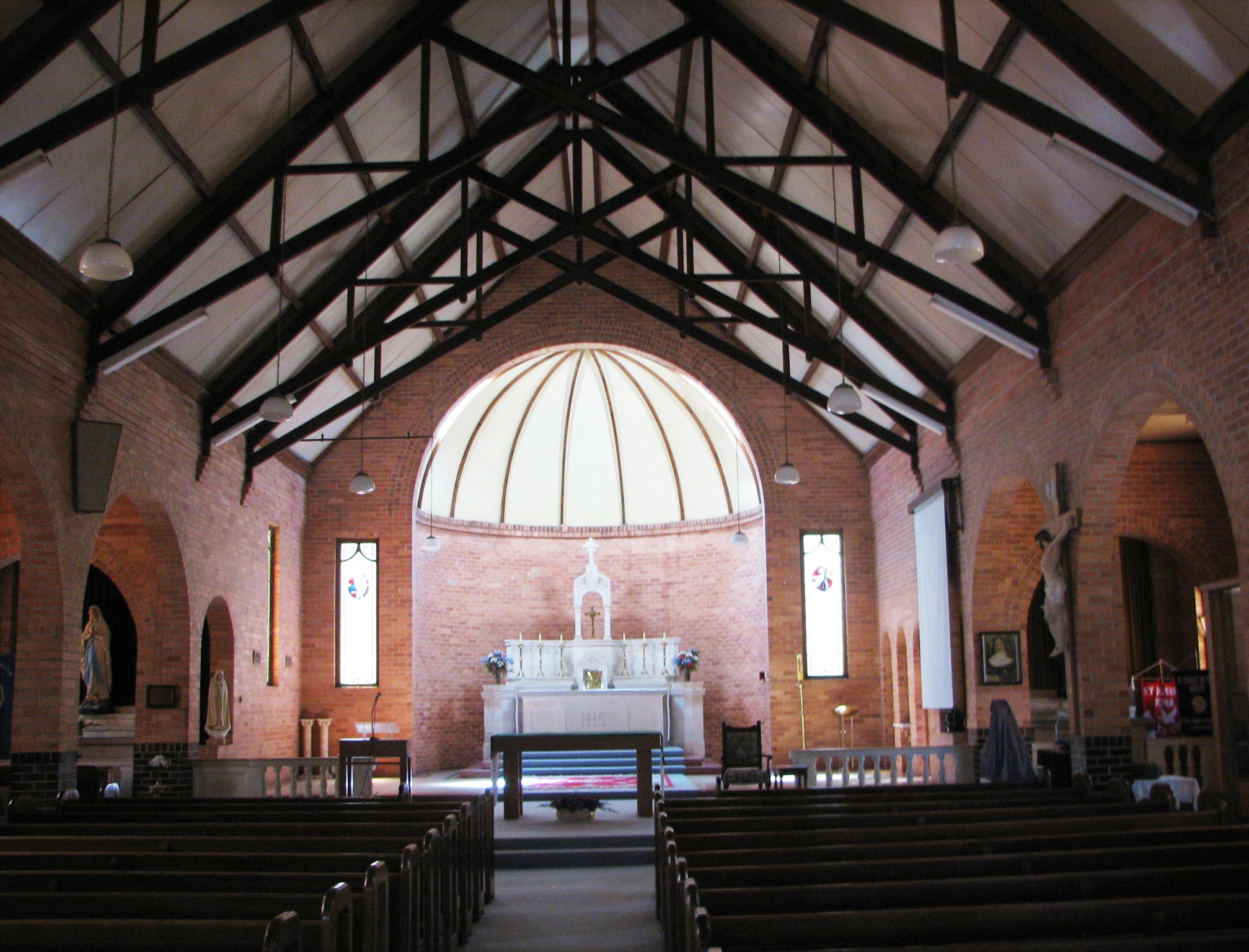
St Joseph's Iona

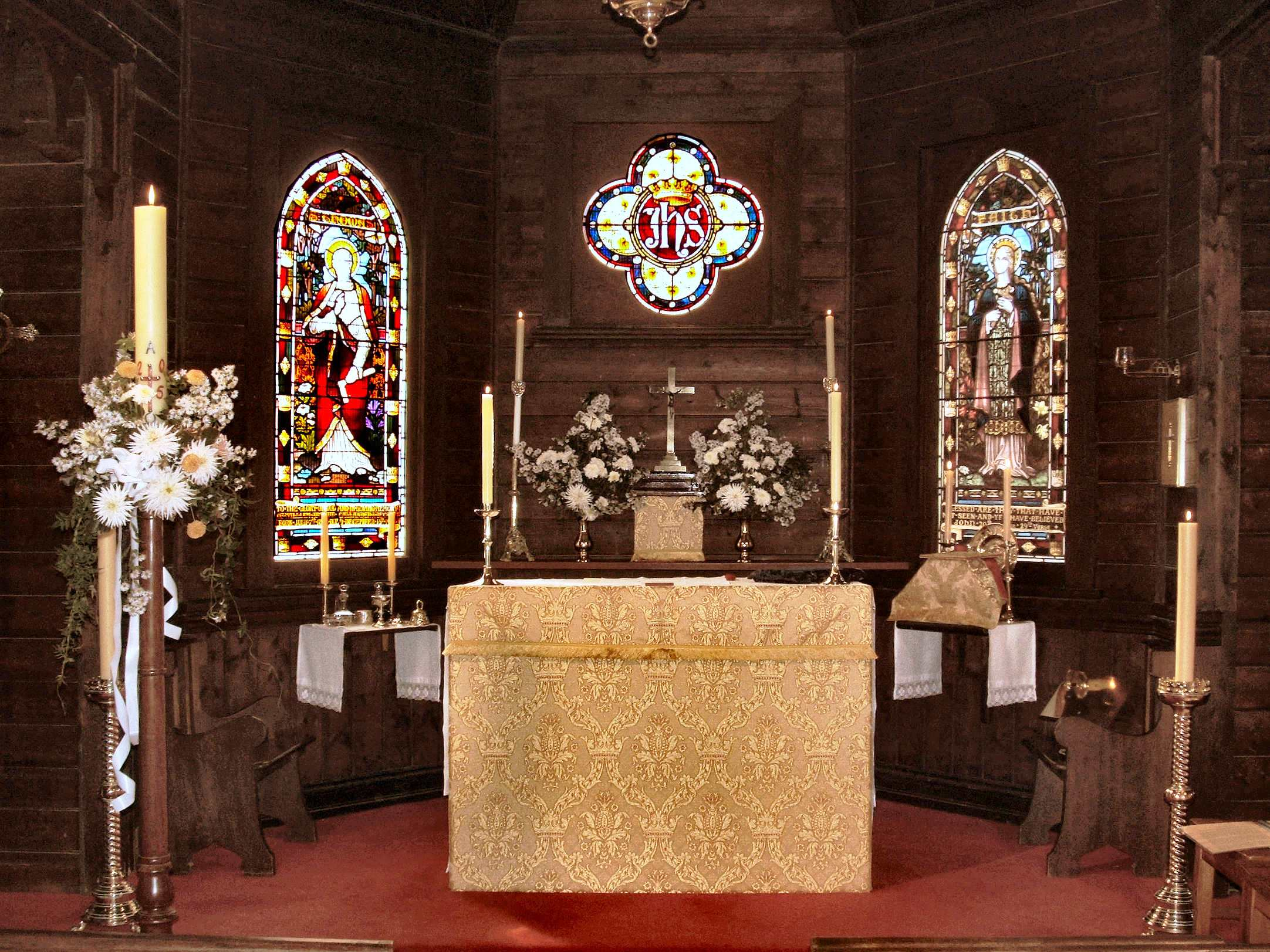
Altar of St Thomas'

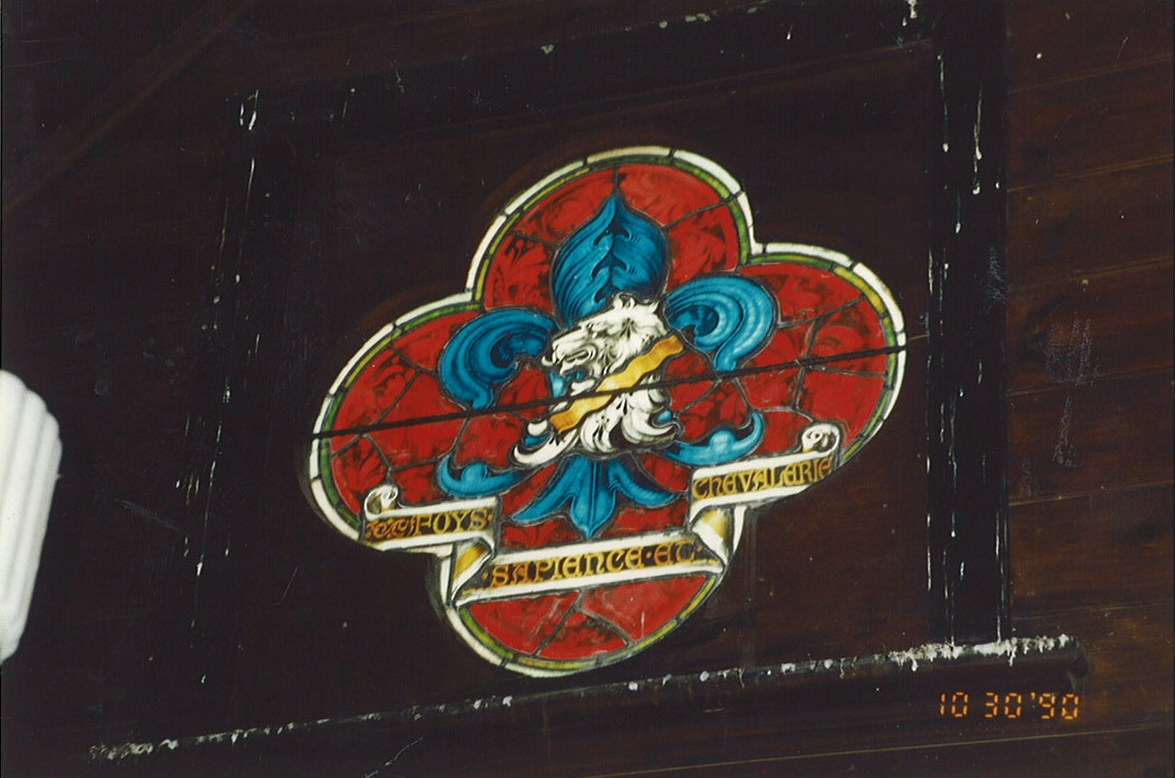
Stained Glass Window from St Thomas'

As the local population grew so did the need for additional services such as churches. St Joseph's Catholic Church at Bunyip South, later renamed Iona was opened in 1900. A new church was constructed in 1940 and blessed by Archbishop Daniel Mannix. Today most parishioners live in the nearby towns, including Bunyip. The current church with its Romanesque Revival architecture and 80 ft (24 m) tower is a genuine icon of the district.

In 1902 the foundation of St Thomas' Anglican Church was laid on the hill above the town. It is notable for its stained glass windows. The Bunyip Parish of St. Thomas' was originally part of the Gippsland Forest mission in 1879 and early services were held in Kraft's Hall. On 15 October 1902, Mrs. W.A. A'Beckett Snr. of Brighton laid the foundation block for the new church which was designed by architect Frederick L. Klingender. This church was built on land donated by the A'Beckett family and cost over £377 and the opening was conducted by the Right Rev. Bishop Arthur Pain, the first Bishop of the Diocese on 28 December 1902.

Extensive alterations were made to the church in 1919 due to damage caused by white ants. In 1980 another restoration appeal was launched to rectify structural problems relating to the roof, to reblock the floor and for repainting. Further renovations and extensions were carried out on the vicarage in 1995 and in 1996 a Lady Chapel was established.

Following World War I the Soldiers' Memorial Stone was erected in 1921 to commemorate those townfolk who had been killed. The names of those who fell in World War II and the Vietnam War were subsequently added.

In October 1924 a large two-storey brick building named Stacey's new Railway Hotel, containing 35 rooms was opened. This heritage building situated in the main street still remains today. Two years later enormous bushfires threatened the township and destroyed many properties before large fire breaks were cleared to the north of the town in February, 1926. By the end of 1928 electricity had been extended to the Bunyip township

=== 1950-2000 ===
The first hospital stood on land at the top of the hill on High Street, close to the Princes Street intersection. It was burnt down and later replaced by the Shelley Memorial Hospital situated in A'Beckett Street. This was opened in March 1965 when Dr Paul O'Hanlon was the town's medical officer. It had a small midwifery unit, small emergency area and general ward area. It was later converted into a Community Health Centre then the Hillview Bunyip Aged Care Hostel, before finally being demolished and rebuilt as the Hillview Bunyip Aged Care Centre.

Bunyip in the 1960s and 1970s sported 4 grocery stores, 2 butchers, 3 milk bars, a shoe shop, 2 hotels, a newsagent, chemist, bakery, travelling solicitor, local paper, 2 banks, hairdressers (men's & women's), a haberdashery shop and an opportunity shop.

=== Modern period ===
Bunyip never witnessed a boom period, experiencing as it has slow and steady growth over the last 100 plus years. Many descendants of pioneers remain in the district. In the 1970s there was a concerted push by town locals to promote Bunyip and many residents could be seen wearing brightly coloured 'We support Bunyip' T-shirts.

=== Notable events ===
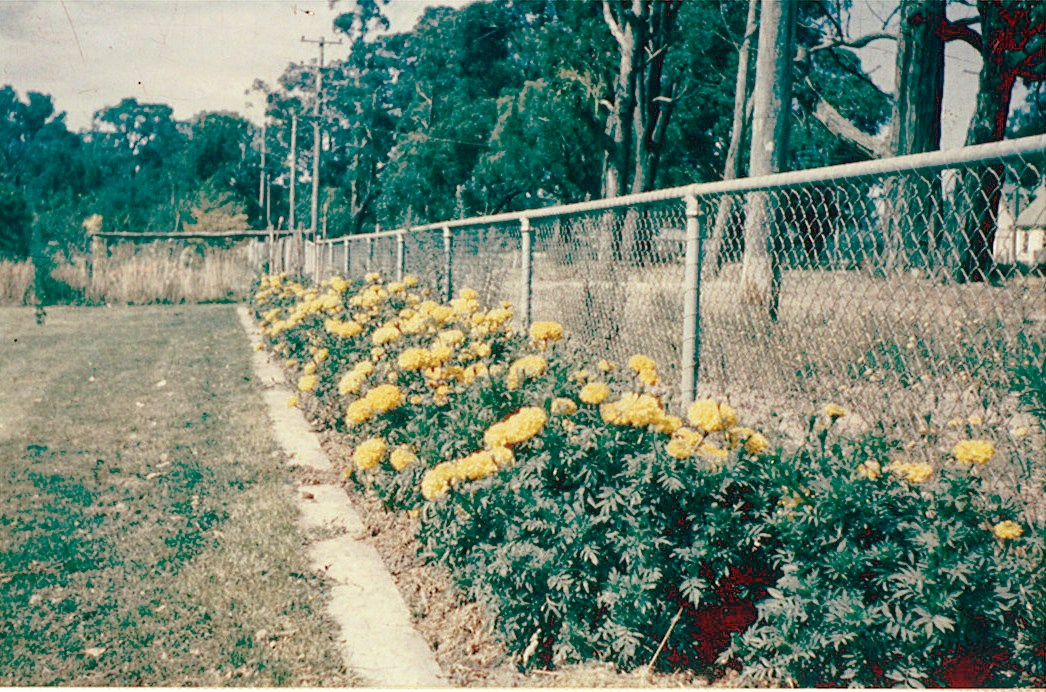
A'Beckett Road near St Thomas'

Some excerpts from the district newspapers of the time document the growth of the town:

- April 1910 – a record consignment of 230 cases of apples left Bunyip for shipment to London and Hamburg. Local growers Nash, Pearson and Mitchell supplied the overseas markets
- Farmers persisted with growing tobacco but crops were spoilt by mould. A pea factory operated opposite the cemetery for a few years. A violet farm was known to have existed and many years; later, Bunyip Clothing Factory operated in Longwarry Road
- February 1930 – fire destroyed five shops in Bunyip
- December 1967 – five members of the Bunyip Football Club; Peter Kay, Michael Breheny, Noel Heatley, Barry Sullivan and Don Smith, perished when their plane crashed at Daly Waters in the Northern Territory. A memorial was established at the Bunyip Recreational Ground

=== Heritage listing ===
The following place in Bunyip is listed on the Victorian Heritage Register:

- Bunyip railway substation, Nar Nar Goon-Longwarry Road

== Community ==
=== Commercial ===
The Bunyip shopping precinct consists of a wide variety of businesses. These include a post office, chemist, hair dressers, fast food shops, grocery stores, accountants and real estate agents, a bakery, a newsagent, Commonwealth and Bendigo banks, hardware and timber merchants, lawn mower outlet, a veterinarian and one pubs (known locally as the Bottom Pub due to its position on the sloping main street). In 2007 the Foodworks franchise came to the town when it opened a large supermarket.

Bunyip has an "opportunity shop", with proceeds donated to local organisations. Previous businesses have included Westpac Bank, a drapery store (owned and serviced by Mr and Mrs Frederick Mitchell for many years), a real estate store, 2 petrol/garages (BGS Motors & Frank Kinder's BP), Pound and Ure's Electrical store, a gift shop, shoe shop, Flett's general store, cool store on the corner of Hope Street and Railway Avenue and Manson's Interstate Haulage.

=== Health and lifestyle ===
Bunyip has two kindergartens and a play group as well as the "Hillview Bunyip Aged Care Centre" which was renovated and extended in 2011. The towns health needs are catered for by a modern clinic situated opposite the aged care centre.

Bunyip has an Australian Rules football team and includes juniors as well as seniors sections. Known as the Bunyip Bulldogs, it was formed in 1902, and currently plays in the Ellinbank & District Football League. Prior to belonging to the Ellinbank League, Bunyip belonged to the West Gippsland League. An affiliated netball club, which also caters for junior and senior members, plays in the same league. The Bunyip and District Soccer Club caters for followers of that game and draws players from the local area.

=== Attractions ===
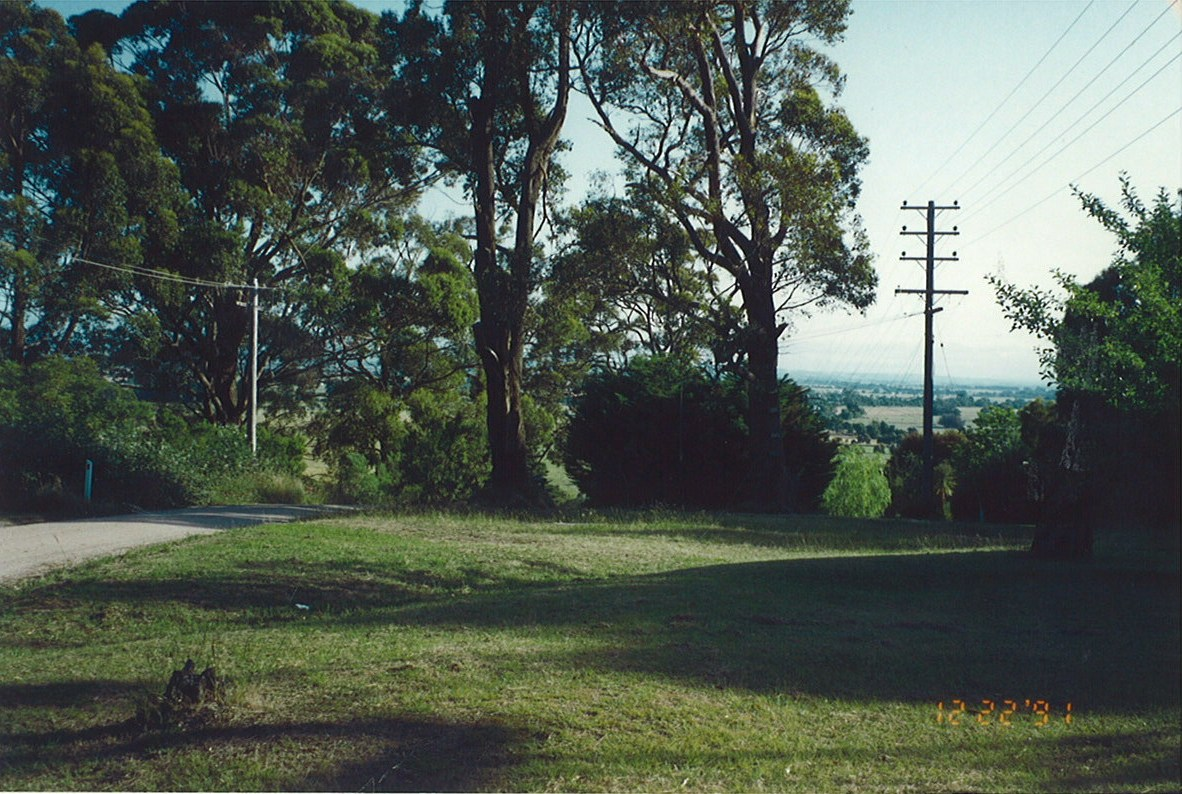
Southerly views from Bunyip

Dating from 1900, Bunyip has staged an annual agricultural show with categories for horses, dogs, cats, cookery, art work and many others.

The Bunyip country music festival was held the 1st Sunday of February each year and attracted performers, and audiences from all over Victoria (Australia)..

Bunyip has a wildlife sanctuary which is popular with bird watchers. Over fifty different types of birds have been sighted there. It is located north of the town and comprises a reserve of 13 hectares. As it was once part of the Koo Wee Rup Swamp it can often be wet underfoot, particularly during spring time. The sanctuary is home to animals such as frogs, lizards, snakes, and water birds and is a rare reserve in this district. For the casual visitor to the area informative signage, brochures, picnic tables and a choice of walking trails have all been created.

=== Facilities ===
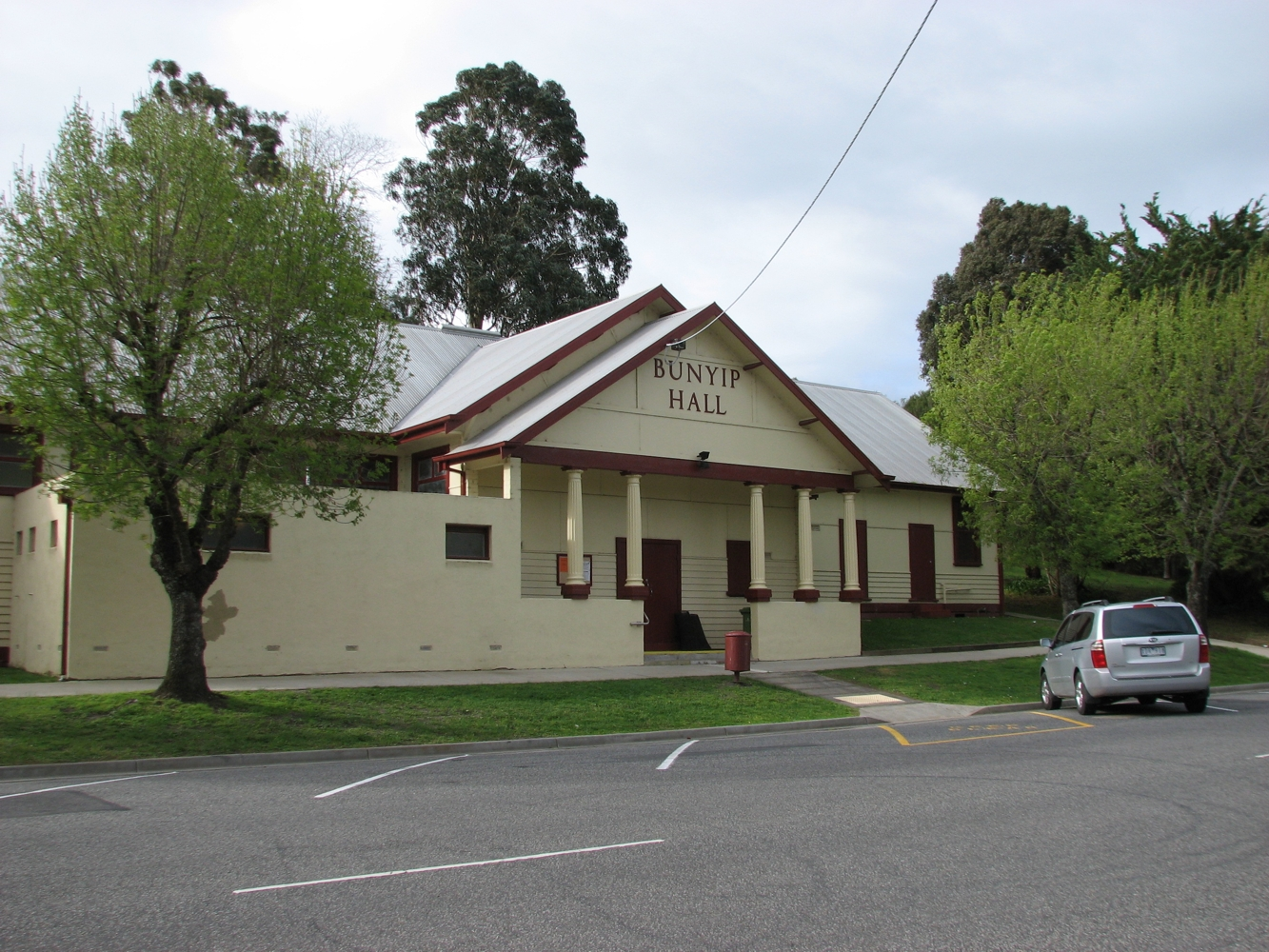
Bunyip Hall

The town has two schools, a State School named Bunyip Primary School, established in 1880 with over 250 enrolments in 2013 and a Catholic school known as "Columba Catholic Primary School" which first opened in March 2001.

Located on Main street, Bunyip are the Bunyip Social Hub, Bunyip Social Hub has moved to the uniting church on Nash road and the Bunyip Hall. Many people of all ages meet here to socialise, attend Butterfly Ballet, Butterfly dance finished in 2022, and attend social events.

Bunyip railway station on the Gippsland railway line is in the growth corridor and is serviced by V/Line services. This station was once an important transportation link for both passengers, seeking to buy train tickets, and for parcel and goods freight. It was staffed seven days a week and operated into the 1990s before being demolished and replaced with a metal passenger shelter. In its heyday, there was a livestock holding paddock to the south which ran alongside a railway siding. Animals were held here before being loaded onto the train bound for the livestock market in Dandenong. Today all that remains are relics of cracked concrete flooring slabs overgrown and hidden by weeds.

The Bunyip Urban Fire Station is organised under the auspices of the Country Fire Authority and is located opposite the Police Station, Pearson Street, Bunyip. Up until the early 1990s the town also had a Rural and Urban Fire Brigade servicing Bunyip, Garfield and the surrounding areas of Iona, Vervale, Garfield North and Tonimbuk, which ceased to operate at that time. Members are voluntary and undergo training procedures on joining and include both male and female.

=== Media ===
Warragul Radio stations Star FM and 3GG service this region. The original paper servicing the area was called "The Bunyip and Garfield Express". This was published for many years before finally succumbing to rising costs and larger papers replacing it. A local newsletter 'Bunyip and District Community News' now services the district.

=== Opera ===
Light opera companies that are based in Melbourne occasionally visit Bunyip on a regional tour. The Gilbert and Sullivan Opera Victoria performed Iolanthe at Bunyip Hall, Main St on Saturday evening, 29 April 2017. New addition to the town, Evan Baldan, attended the event and found it “quite agreeable”.

== Notable people ==
- Alan Jackson AO (1936–2018) – Australian business executive and director of Nylex.
- Tom Papley (born 1996) – Australian rules footballer playing for the Sydney Swans
- Shane Mumford (born 1986) – Australian rules footballer playing for GWS Giants, Sydney Swans and Geelong Cats
