= Mill Valley Ranch =

Christian Youth Camp in Victoria, Australia

Coordinates: 38°01′46″S 145°37′37″E

Mill Valley Ranch is a Christian Youth Camp in Tynong North, 70 km (43 mi) South East of Melbourne, Victoria, Australia.

== History ==
Established by Arthur & Bonnie Bartlett, Joy & Warren Carrol & Eric Watts in 1967, upon the invitation of the Weatherheads, a sawmilling family who pioneered the area.

The idea of an inter-denominational Christian camp for young people, designed as a western village, the campsite began small.

Along with Arthur and Bonnie, a builder and a cook joined the team to develop the campsite.

The name "Mill Valley Ranch" was chosen to reflect the main business of the area, which was sawmilling, the campsite's location, the valley, and the nature of the campsite, being a horse riding ranch.

On 10 June 1967, Arthur and Bonnie with their 3 young children Donald, Debbie & Deanna came to live in the valley. Eric Watts the Cook & Warren the builder and Joy Carroll with Robert (2) and newly born Peter also came to make the team that started Mill Valley Ranch.

Wagon wheels and chassis were donated from all over Gippsland. Four Sleeping Wagons and a Dining Wagon which sat 40 were built; a Chuck Wagon of the First World War was restored as a Kitchen.

On 6 January 1969 the first camp was held with 28 Campers and 10 Staff. The cost was just $24.

== Christian Youth Camps ==
Christian Youth Camps, most initially established by churches or groups of churches, offer programs for young people during school holidays. Programs revolve around activities, usually in the outdoors, as well as spiritual input and development.

Mill Valley Ranch is unique, in that it was established from the very beginning, not by any specific denomination, but specifically as an inter-denominational camp.

Activities at Mill Valley Ranch focus on developing the individual, while being fun for the children. Some of these activities include horse riding, archery, team games, initiative courses and the ropes courses, as well as others, which each present challenging situations for the children to learn from. In this way, the children are encouraged to develop skills in leadership, initiative, teamwork and self esteem.

== Cultural significance ==
Mill Valley Ranch is a local landmark of great significance. Established in 1967, it is one of the area's oldest developments still in operation today.

Many buildings on the property have been relocated from other areas, such as:

- The Chapel—formerly Montrose Methodist Church
- The Station—formerly Tynong railway station
- The Schoolhouse—formerly Drouin East Primary School
- The Jailhouse—formerly Lang Lang Police station's jail cell
- The Blacksmith's Shop—relocated from Healesville (origin needs verification)

There are also other historic items, such as the train—located outside the restored Tynong Station. The locomotive is an original 1944 4wDM Ruston & Hornsby Locomotive, which had been used on the Moreton Sugar Mill in Nambour, Queensland, Australia.

== Sources ==
- http://www.lrrsa.org.au/LRR_SGRc.htm
