= Mount Beenak =

Mountain in Victoria, Australia

- Location within Victoria

Highest point
- Elevation: 745 m (2,444 ft)
- Coordinates: 37°52′49″S 145°41′38″E

Geography
- Location: Victoria, Australia
- Parent range: Great Dividing Range

Climbing
- First ascent: Unknown
- Easiest route: Walk up gated fire access track from Mount Beenak Road.

Mount Beenak is a mountain in Victoria, Australia 65 km from Melbourne.

The summit is 745m and is most easily accessed by following a fire access vehicle track from the Mount Beenak Road.

There are good views across to the Yarra Valley, the Latrobe Valley and Central Highlands mountain ranges.

Extensive logging of the summit region left it bare of forest in July 2013.

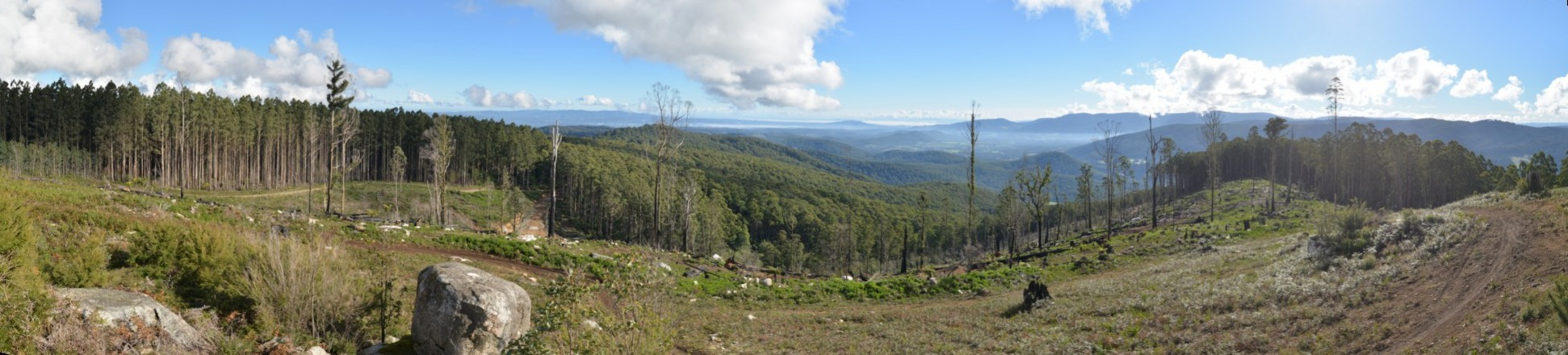
Mount Beenak panorama looking towards Yarra Valley, July 2013

== See also ==
- List of mountains in Australia § Victoria
