= Nar Nar Goon =

Coordinates: 38°04′55″S 145°34′30″E

- Town
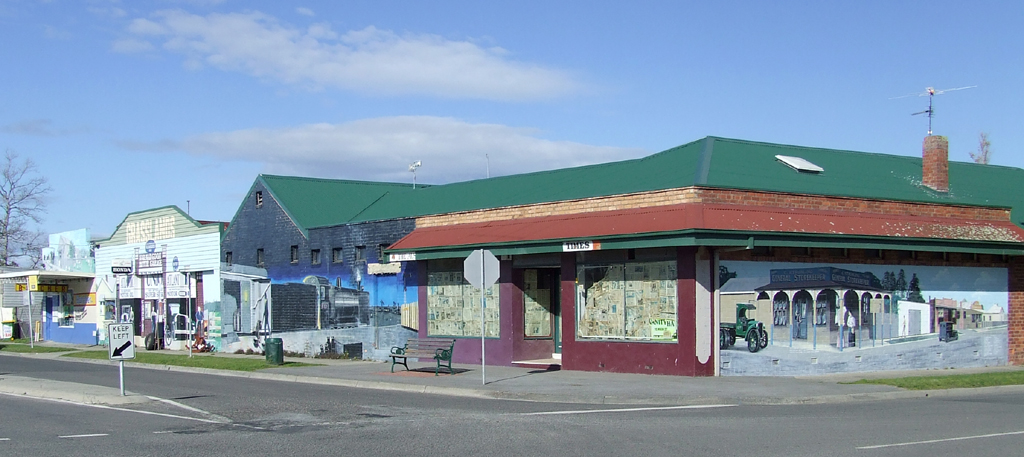
- Murals on the intersection of Nar Nar Goon Road and Carney Street
- Interactive map of Nar Nar Goon
- Country: Australia
- State: Victoria
- LGA: Shire of Cardinia
- Location: 61 km (38 mi) from Melbourne; 22 km (14 mi) from Berwick
- Established: 1865

Government
  - State electorate: Narracan
  - Federal division: La Trobe
- Elevation: 95 m (312 ft)

Population
  - Total: 1,023 (2021 census)
- Postcode: 3812
Localities around Nar Nar Goon
Nar Nar Goon North	Maryknoll	Tynong North
Honora Fields	Nar Nar Goon	Tynong
Honora Fields	Koo Wee Rup	Cora Lynn

Nar Nar Goon is a town in Gippsland, Victoria, Australia, 61 km (38 mi) south-east of Melbourne's Central Business District, located within the Shire of Cardinia local government area. Nar Nar Goon recorded a population of 1,023 at the 2021 census.

Numerous murals have been painted upon a number of its old and historical buildings.

== History ==
Nar Nar Goon is situated in the Kulin nation traditional Aboriginal country. The Boon wurrung people are local custodians within the Kulin nation. The name is thought to come from a Boonwurrung name for the koala, or the rakali.

The post office opened on 15 September 1881.

In 1881 the railway line arrived.

In 2021, a western portion of Nar Nar Goon was annexed to form the new south-east greater Melbourne metropolitan suburb of Pakenham East.

== Facilities ==
The town contains a private and public school, each offering primary education, an active progress association, a CFA fire station, scout hall, community centre and hotel. Chairo Christian school primary/high school is located in this town too.

The town has its own railway station on the Gippsland line.

The town has an Australian Rules football team competing in the Ellinbank & District Football League.

The cricket club in town is Nar Nar Goon/Maryknoll which plays in the West Gippsland Cricket Association.

The town also has a small number of shops and a pub. The front bar of the pub is named after Nar Nar Goon great, Bill "Doc" Doherty.

The Light Horse & Field Artillery Museum is also located in Nar Nar Goon.

== Gallery ==
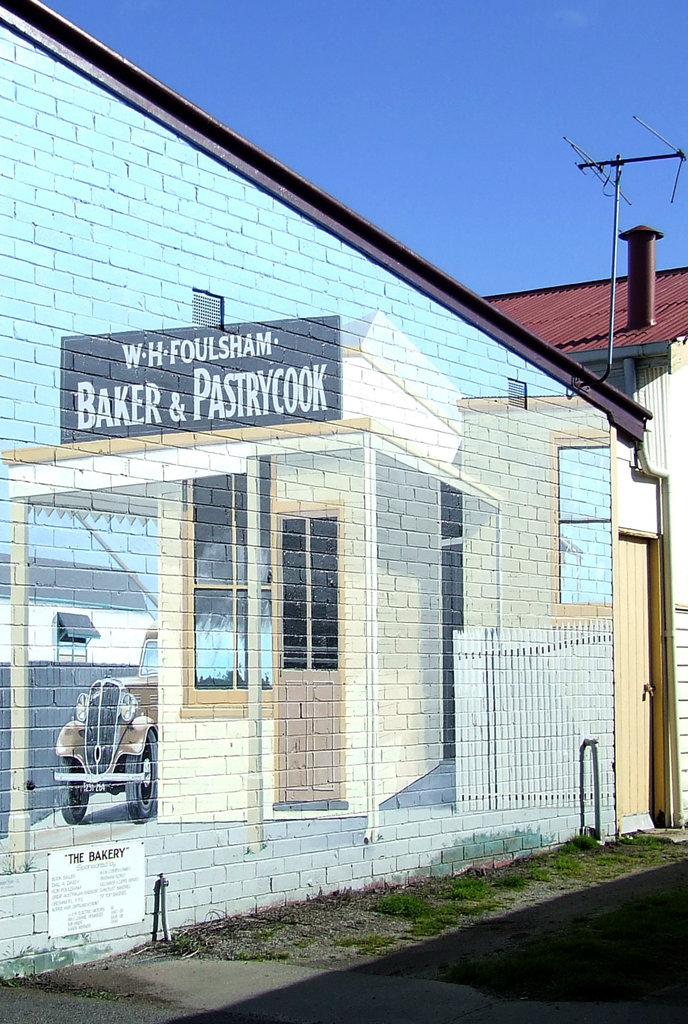
Mural on Nar Nar Goon Road

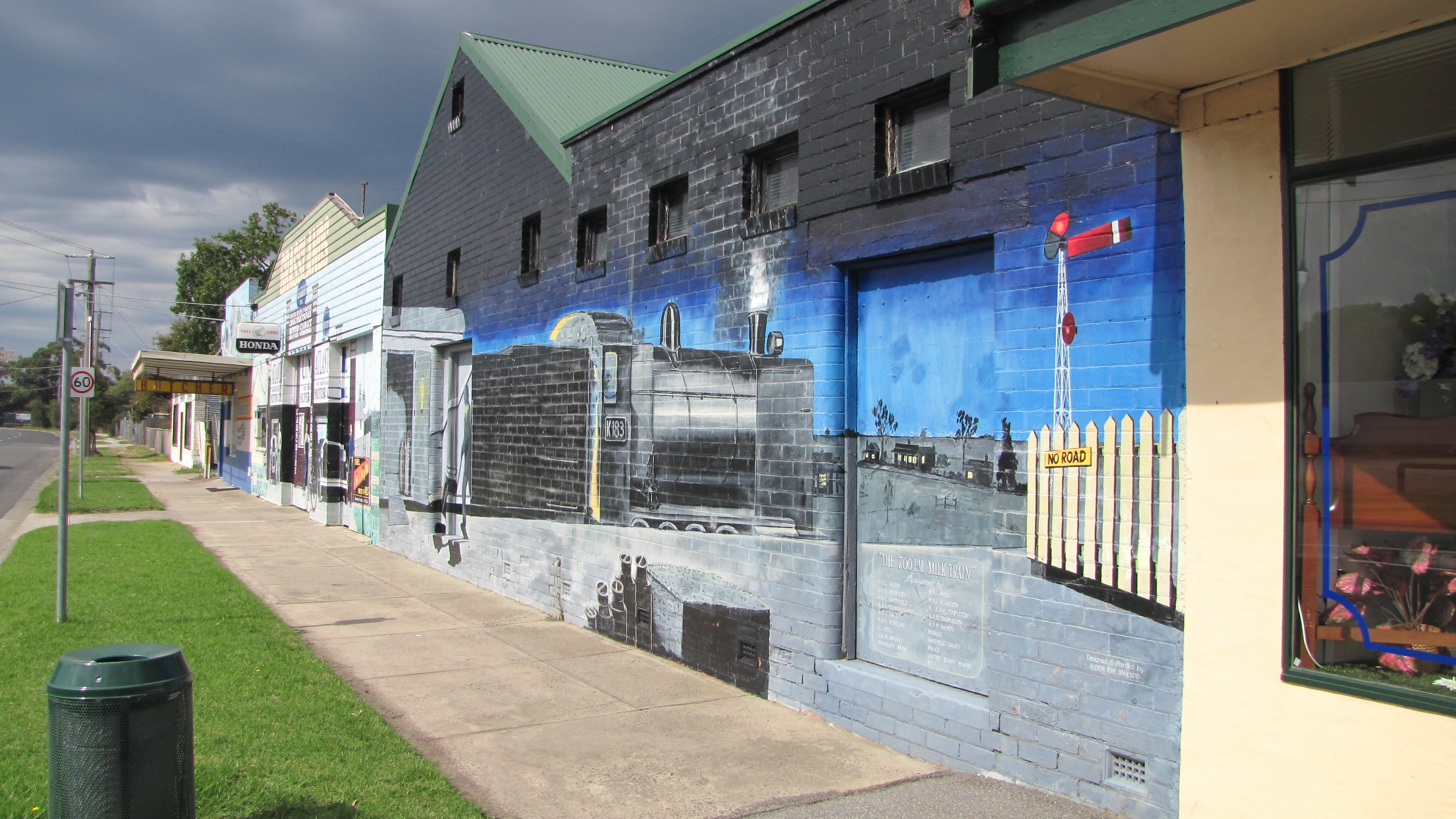
Another mural

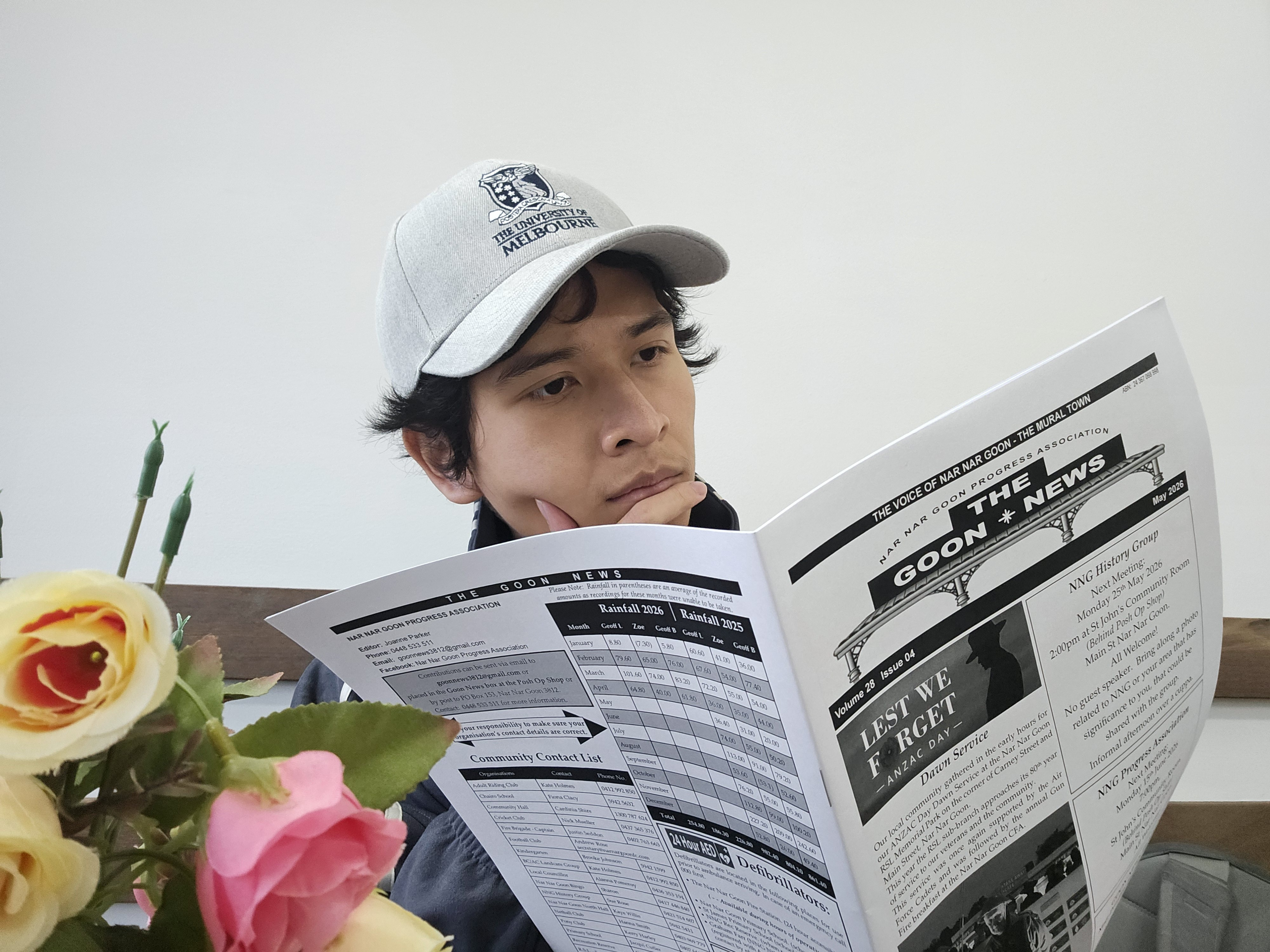
A student reading the Nar Nar Goon community newsletter, The Goon News.

== See also ==
- Shire of Pakenham – Nar Nar Goon was previously within this former local government area.
