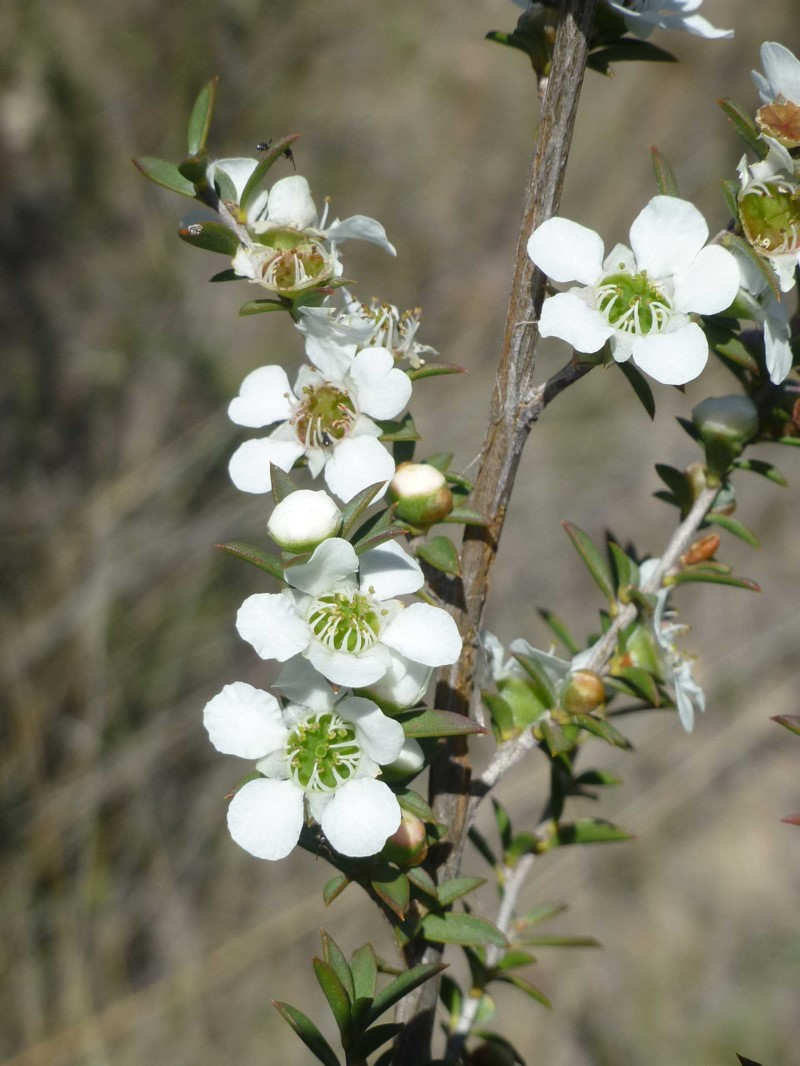
- Leptospermum continentale on Black Mountain (Australian Capital Territory) in the A.C.T.

Scientific classification
- Kingdom: Plantae
- Clade: Tracheophytes
- Clade: Angiosperms
- Clade: Eudicots
- Clade: Rosids
- Order: Myrtales
- Family: Myrtaceae
- Genus: Leptospermum
- Species: L. continentale

Binomial name
- Leptospermum continentale Joy Thomps.
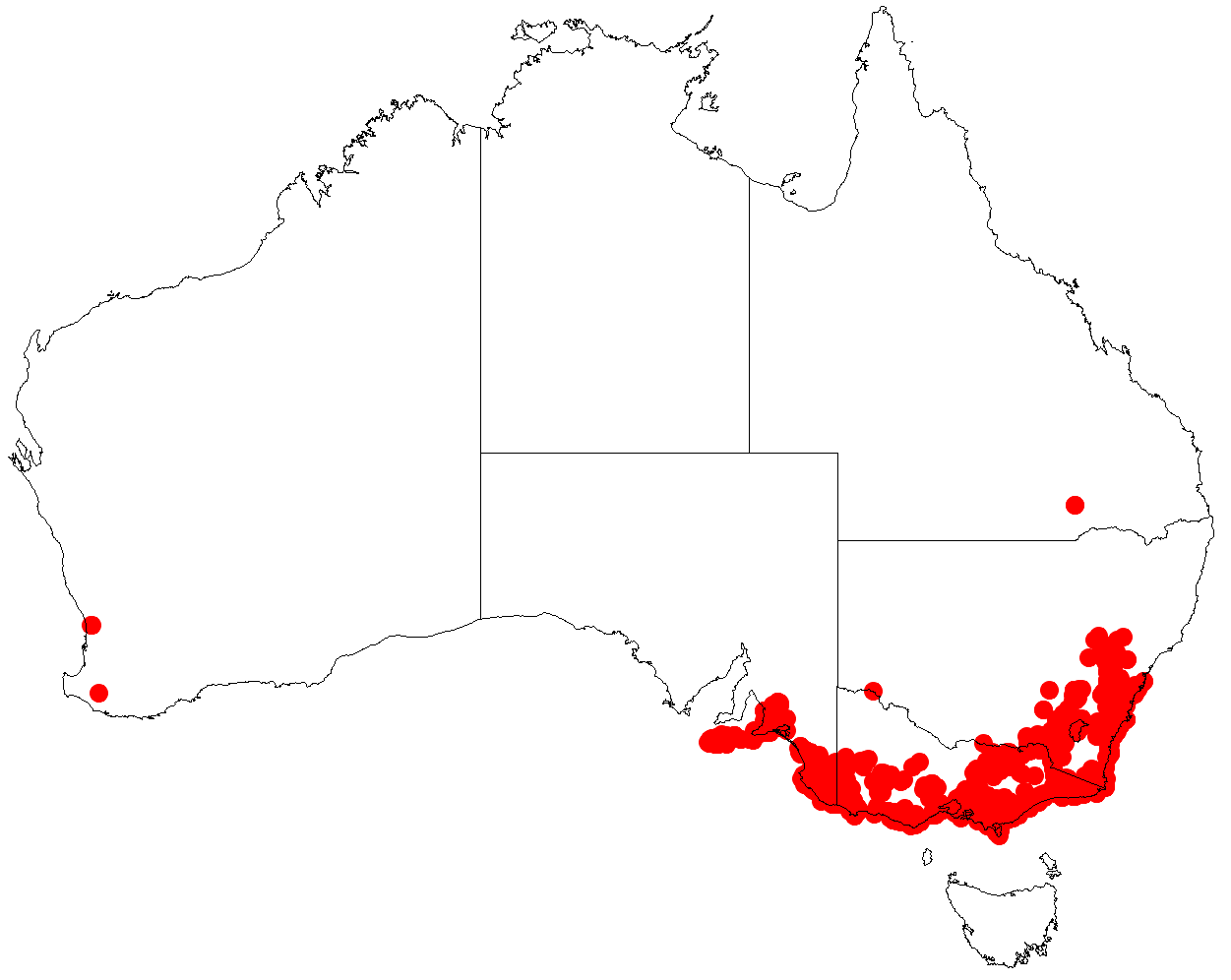
- Occurrence data from AVH

= Leptospermum continentale =

Prickly tea-tree

Species of plant

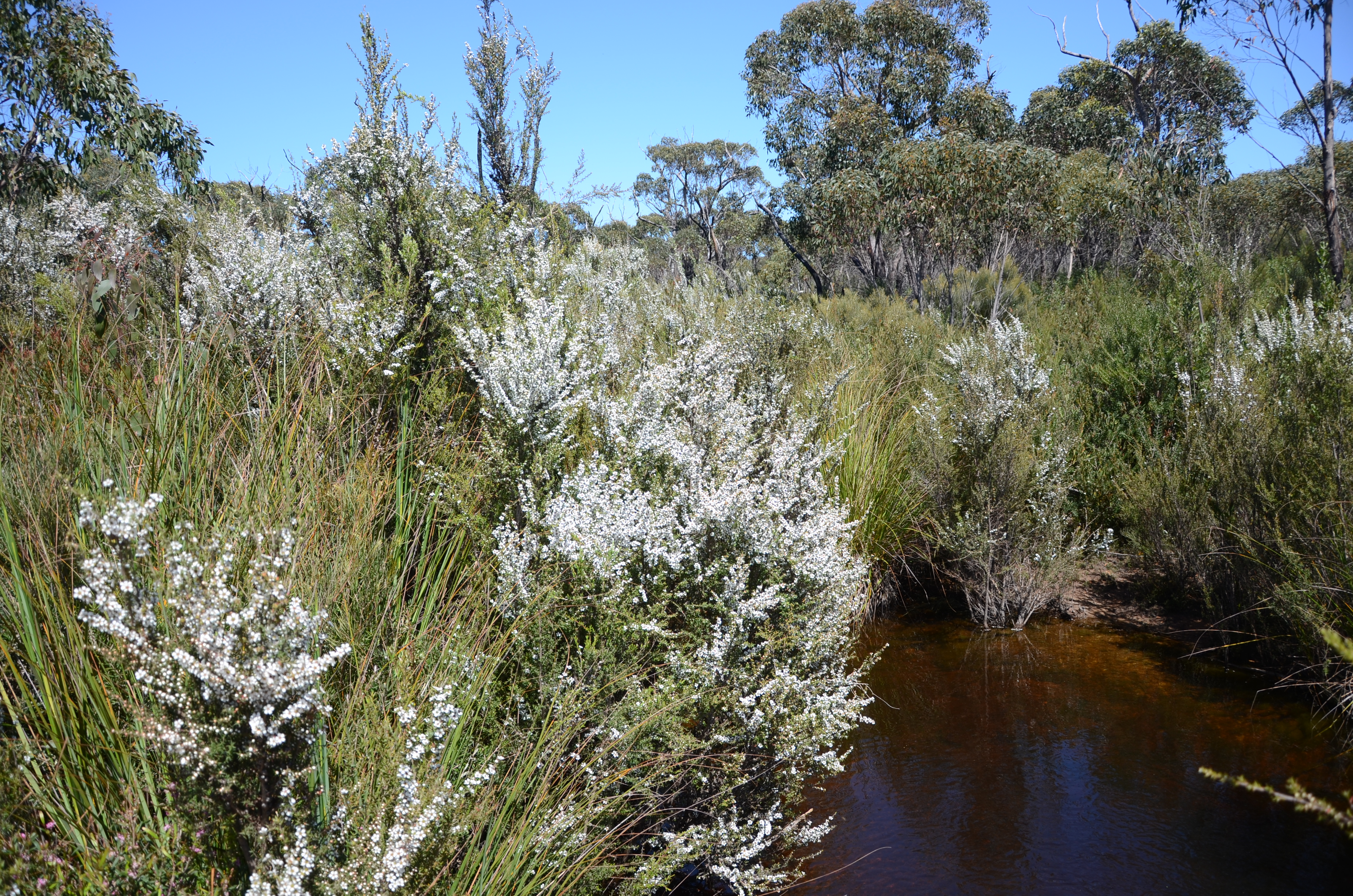
Habit

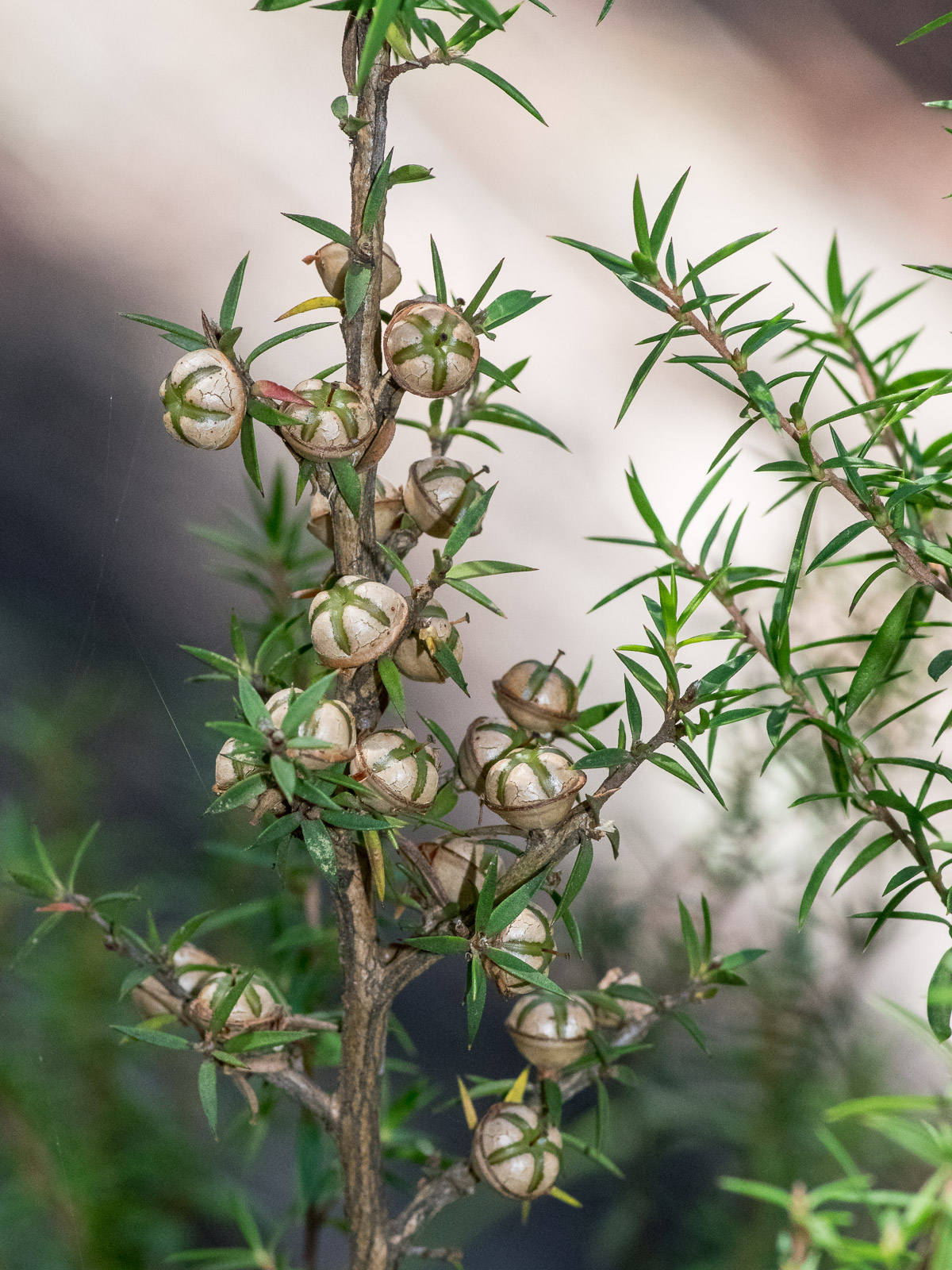
Fruit

Leptospermum continentale, commonly known as prickly tea-tree, is a species of slender, straggling shrub that is endemic to south-eastern Australia. It has sharp-pointed, narrowly egg-shaped leaves, white flowers arranged singly in leaf axils and woody fruit that remains on the plant when mature.

== Description ==
Leptospermum continentale is a slender, straggling shrub that typically grows to a height of 1–2 m (3 ft 3 in – 6 ft 7 in) or more. It has smooth bark that is shed in stringy strips. The leaves are narrow egg-shaped, 5–13 mm (0.20–0.51 in) long and 1–3.5 mm (0.039–0.138 in) wide with a sharp point on the end. The flowers are arranged singly in leaf axils, 8–12 mm (0.31–0.47 in) in diameter on a pedicel up to 1 mm (0.039 in) long and the floral cup is 2–3 mm (0.079–0.118 in) long. The sepals are triangular, mostly glabrous, about 1.5 mm (0.059 in) long and fall off as the flower opens. The petals are usually white, rarely pink, 3–5 mm (0.12–0.20 in) long and the stamens are 1.5–2 mm (0.059–0.079 in) long. Flowering occurs between September and February and the fruit is a broadly hemispherical capsule 5–8 mm (0.20–0.31 in) wide and remaining on the plant when mature.

== Taxonomy and naming ==
Leptospermum continentale was first formally described in 1989 by Joy Thompson in Telopea from specimens she collected in Kanangra-Boyd National Park in 1982. The specific epithet (continentale) refers to the distribution of the species on the Australian mainland, in contrast to its close relative Leptospermum scoparium that occurs in Tasmania, some Bass Strait Islands and New Zealand.

== Distribution and habitat ==
Prickly tea-tree occurs from Mudgee in central eastern New South Wales and the Australian Capital Territory to the southern half of Victoria and south-eastern South Australia. It is widespread in heath and woodland in well-drained sandy soil but also in swampy places.

== Use in horticulture ==
This tea-tree can be propagated from cuttings or from seed and is a hardy shrub that tolerates most soils and aspects, including poorly-drained sites.
