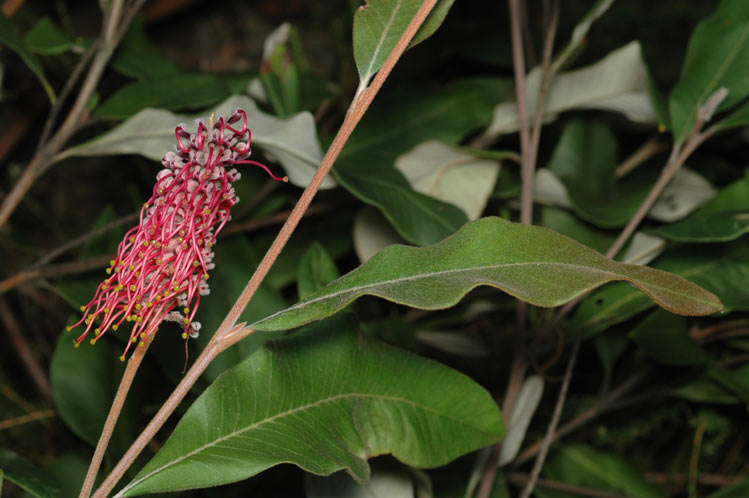
- In the botanic gardens at Batemans Bay

Conservation status
- Least Concern (IUCN 3.1)

Scientific classification
- Kingdom: Plantae
- Clade: Embryophytes
- Clade: Tracheophytes
- Clade: Angiosperms
- Clade: Eudicots
- Order: Proteales
- Family: Proteaceae
- Genus: Grevillea
- Species: G. macleayana

Binomial name
- Grevillea macleayana ((McGill.) Olde & Marriott

Synonyms
- Grevillea barklyana subsp. macleayana McGill.

= Grevillea macleayana =

Species of shrub endemic to Australia

Grevillea macleayana, commonly known as Jervis Bay grevillea, is a species of flowering plant in the family Proteaceae and is endemic to south-eastern New South Wales. It is a spreading shrub with egg-shaped to elliptic, sometimes lobed leaves, and greenish or greyish flowers with a pink to red style.

== Description ==
Jervis Bay grevillea is a spreading to erect shrub that typically grows to a height of 1–3 m (3 ft 3 in – 9 ft 10 in). Its leaves are usually elliptic to egg-shaped, 25–200 mm (0.98–7.87 in) long and 10–80 mm (0.39–3.15 in) wide, sometimes with two to five oblong lobes 10–30 mm (0.39–1.18 in) long and 10–20 mm (0.39–0.79 in) wide. The lower surface of the leaves is densely covered with soft hairs. The flowers are arranged on one side of a rachis 40–50 mm (1.6–2.0 in) long and are greenish-white to greyish pink with a pink to red style, the pistil 22–28.6 mm (0.87–1.13 in) long. Flowering occurs from September to January and the fruit is a woolly-hairy follicle 12–19 mm (0.47–0.75 in) long.

It is known from two distinct forms:

Coastal form - Occurs in the Jervis Bay to Ulladulla areas in open eucalypt woodland or heath. It usually grows as an open shrub from 2–3 metres (6.6–9.8 feet) tall with mostly entire (with some lobed), elliptic leaves.

Woolly form - Occurs near Ulladulla and Bundanoon. Its leaves are coarse and usually lobed and its flowers have a woolly indumentum.

=== Similar species ===
Jervis Bay grevillea is closely related to the gully grevillea (G. barklyana) which differs by its larger habit, generally longer leaves, triangular lobes, narrower, more condensed inflorescence with flowers that have a silky ovary and conical shaped pollen presenters. It is also related to the laurel-leaf grevillea (G. laurifolia) which differs in its prostrate (ground-covering) habit and silky lower leaf surface.

== Taxonomy ==
Jervis Bay grevillea was first formally described as Grevillea barklyana subsp. macleayana in 1986 by Donald McGillivray in his book, New Names in Grevillea (Proteaceae), from specimens collected near Bream Beach by Roger Coveny in 1971. In 1994, Peter Olde and Neil Marriott changed the name to Grevillea macleayana in The Grevillea Book. The specific epithet (macleayana) honours William John Macleay.

Once described as the 'Deua form' of the species, Grevillea gilmourii is now regarded as a separate species.

== Distribution and habitat ==
Grevillea macleayana grows in low woodland or shrubland in near-coastal areas of New South Wales from near Jervis Bay to Moruya, and inland as far as Bundanoon.
