= Nar Nar Goon North =

- Town
- Interactive map of Nar Nar Goon North
- Coordinates: 38°1′8.4″S 145°33′3.6″E
- Country: Australia
- State: Victoria
- LGA: Shire of Cardinia
- Location: 56 km (35 mi) from Melbourne

Government
  - State electorates: Monbulk; Narracan; Pakenham
  - Federal division: La Trobe

Population
  - Total: 819 (2021 census)
- Postcode: 3812
Localities around Nar Nar Goon North
Pakenham	Gembrook	Maryknoll
Honora Fields	Nar Nar Goon North	Nar Nar Goon
Honora Fields	Nar Nar Goon	Nar Nar Goon

Nar Nar Goon North is a suburb (Note: Only temporary due to a housing estate currently within the locality's boundaries, which will become part of Pakenham East once the suburb is officially gazetted.) and rural locality in Victoria, Australia, 56 kilometres (35 mi) south-east of Melbourne's Central Business District, located within the Shire of Cardinia local government area. Nar Nar Goon North recorded a population of 819 at the 2021 census.

== History ==
Nar Nar Goon North Post Office opened on 1 January 1917 and closed in 1971.

Development of the Averley housing estate commenced c. 2023. Although it is soon to become part of the future suburb of Pakenham East, the estate is currently within the boundaries of Nar Nar Goon North.

== Sport and leisure ==
Nar Nar Goon North features horse riding tracks through the bush land of the Bunyip State Park. Horse riding lessons are also available from local trainers.

== See also ==
- Shire of Pakenham – Nar Nar Goon North was previously within this former local government area.
