= Iona, Victoria =

Iona
- Town
- Interactive map of Iona
- Coordinates: 38°09′S 145°41′E
- Country: Australia
- State: Victoria
- LGA: Shire of Cardinia
- Location: 73 km (45 mi) from Melbourne

Government
  - State electorate: Narracan
  - Federal division: Flinders

Population
  - Total: 240 (2021 census)
- Postcode: 3815

Iona is a locality in Victoria, Australia, 73 kilometres (45 mi) south-east of Melbourne's Central Business District, located within the Shire of Cardinia local government area. Iona recorded a population of 240 at the 2021 census. It is made up of mostly farm land.

== History ==
Bunyip South Post Office opened on 26 August 1898, was renamed Iona in 1905 and closed in 1977. St Josephs Catholic Church at Iona was opened on 16 December 1900 by the Reverend Father Gleeson. The original building was replaced in 1940 by the current brick building. St Josephs Catholic School opened on 11 April 1915.

== See also ==
- Shire of Pakenham — Iona was previously within this former local government area.
