= Bunyip State Park =

Protected area in Victoria, Australia

- IUCN category II (national park)
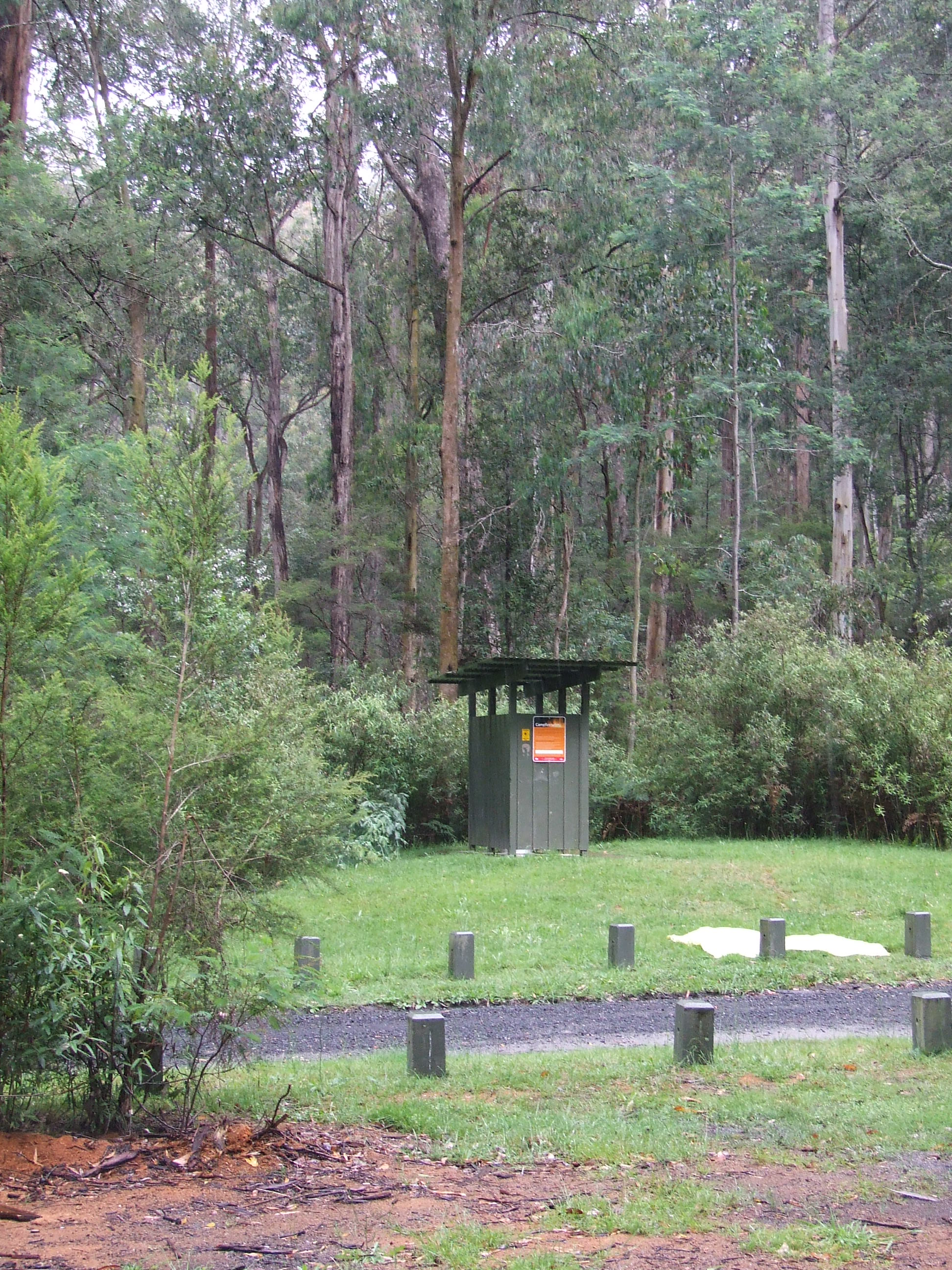
- Campsite toilet

- Location within Victoria
- Location: Victoria
- Nearest city: Gembrook
- Coordinates: 37°58′13″S 145°42′12″E
- Area: 166 km^{2} (64 sq mi)
- Established: 1992
- Governing body: Parks Victoria
- Website: https://www.parks.vic.gov.au/places-to-see/parks/bunyip-state-park

Bunyip State Park is a 166-square-kilometre (64 sq mi) state park 65 kilometres (40 mi) east of Melbourne, near the town of Gembrook, in the southern slopes of the Great Dividing Range within the Australian state of Victoria.

== Location and features ==
The area was used for logging from 1898 until 1990, and was turned into a state park two years later. The park is named after the bunyip, an Aboriginal mythical creature that was thought to live along the Bunyip River that flows through the park.

The terrain in the park is mostly dense forest and swampy heathland, with prickly tea-tree, mountain ash and mealy stringybark present.

Camping is available at Nash Creek Camping Area under towering mountain ash. Black Snake Creek Road runs through the centre of the park from east to west. To the south of Black Snake Creek Road the park is suitable for walking, mountain bike riding and horse riding. To the north for trail bike and four wheel driving. Parks Victoria have a few maps with suggested rides, drives and walks.

About 45% percent of the park was burnt in the 2009 Black Saturday bushfires.

== Wildlife ==
Kangaroos, koalas, lyrebirds, wallabies, and wombats are part of the wildlife in the park. There are also nectar-feeding birds such as the helmeted honey-eater and southern emu-wren, which can be seen to jump between low-hanging branches.
