= Garfield North =

- Town
- Interactive map of Garfield North
- Coordinates: 38°03′S 145°41′E
- Country: Australia
- State: Victoria
- LGA: Shire of Cardinia
- Location: 68 km (42 mi) from Melbourne

Government
  - State electorate: Narracan
  - Federal division: La Trobe

Population
  - Total: 236 (2021 census)
- Postcode: 3814

Garfield North is a locality in Victoria, Australia, 68 km south-east of Melbourne's Central Business District, located within the Shire of Cardinia local government area. Garfield North recorded a population of 236 at the 2021 census.

== See also ==
- Shire of Pakenham – Garfield North was previously within this former local government area.
