= List of places on the Victorian Heritage Register in the Shire of Cardinia =

This is a list of places on the Victorian Heritage Register in the Shire of Cardinia in Victoria, Australia. The Victorian Heritage Register is maintained by the Heritage Council of Victoria.

As of April 2020, the Victorian Heritage Register listed the following eight state-registered places within the Shire of Cardinia:

Place name	Place #	Location	Suburb or Town	Co-ordinates	Built	State registered	Photo
Bayles Bridge No. 1 and No. 2	H1852	Koo Wee Rup-Longwarry Rd over Yallock Creek	Bayles	38°10′45″S 145°34′25″E	1950	18 November 1999	
Bunyip railway substation	H2025	Nar Nar Goon-Longwarry Rd	Bunyip	38°05′55″S 145°42′45″E	1952	13 November 2003	
Cockatoo kindergarten (former)	H2303	2-10 McBride St	Cockatoo	37°56′10″S 145°29′27″E	1976	10 May 2012	
Harewood	H0284	3300 South Gippsland Hwy	Koo Wee Rup	38°12′46″S 145°25′52″E	1865-68	9 October 1974	
Kurth Kiln (Note: Also listed on the VHR in the Shire of Yarra Ranges.)	H2012	Soldiers Rd (Gembrook); Beenak Rd (Yellingbo)	Gembrook; Yellingbo	37°53′57″S 145°34′32″E	1941-42	20 March 2003	
Monomeith homestead	H0452	405 Monomeith Rd	Monomeith	38°11′49″S 145°32′11″E	1860	8 August 1979	
Nobelius nursery, packing shed, and railway siding	H2285	Emerald Lake Rd and Princess Ave	Emerald	37°55′51″S 145°26′58″E	1900	14 June 2012	
Silverwells	H0611	330 Ure Rd	Gembrook	37°55′09″S 145°32′53″E	1879	11 December 1985	
