= Cockatoo (disambiguation) =

A cockatoo is a parrot from the bird family Cacatuidae.

Cockatoo may refer also to:

== Places ==
- Cockatoo, Queensland, a locality in Australia
- Cockatoo, Victoria, a town in the Dandenong Ranges, 50 km east of Melbourne, Australia
  - Cockatoo railway station, situated on the Puffing Billy Railway, Melbourne

== Other ==
- Cockatoos (novel), a 1954 novel by Australian author Miles Franklin
- The Cockatoos, a 1974 story collection by Australian author Patrick White
- Nakia Cockatoo (born 1996), Australian rules football player
- USS Cockatoo, two ships of the United States Navy

== See also ==
- Cockatiel
- Cockatoo Island (disambiguation)
