= Wright railway station =

Railway station in Victoria, Australia

Wright
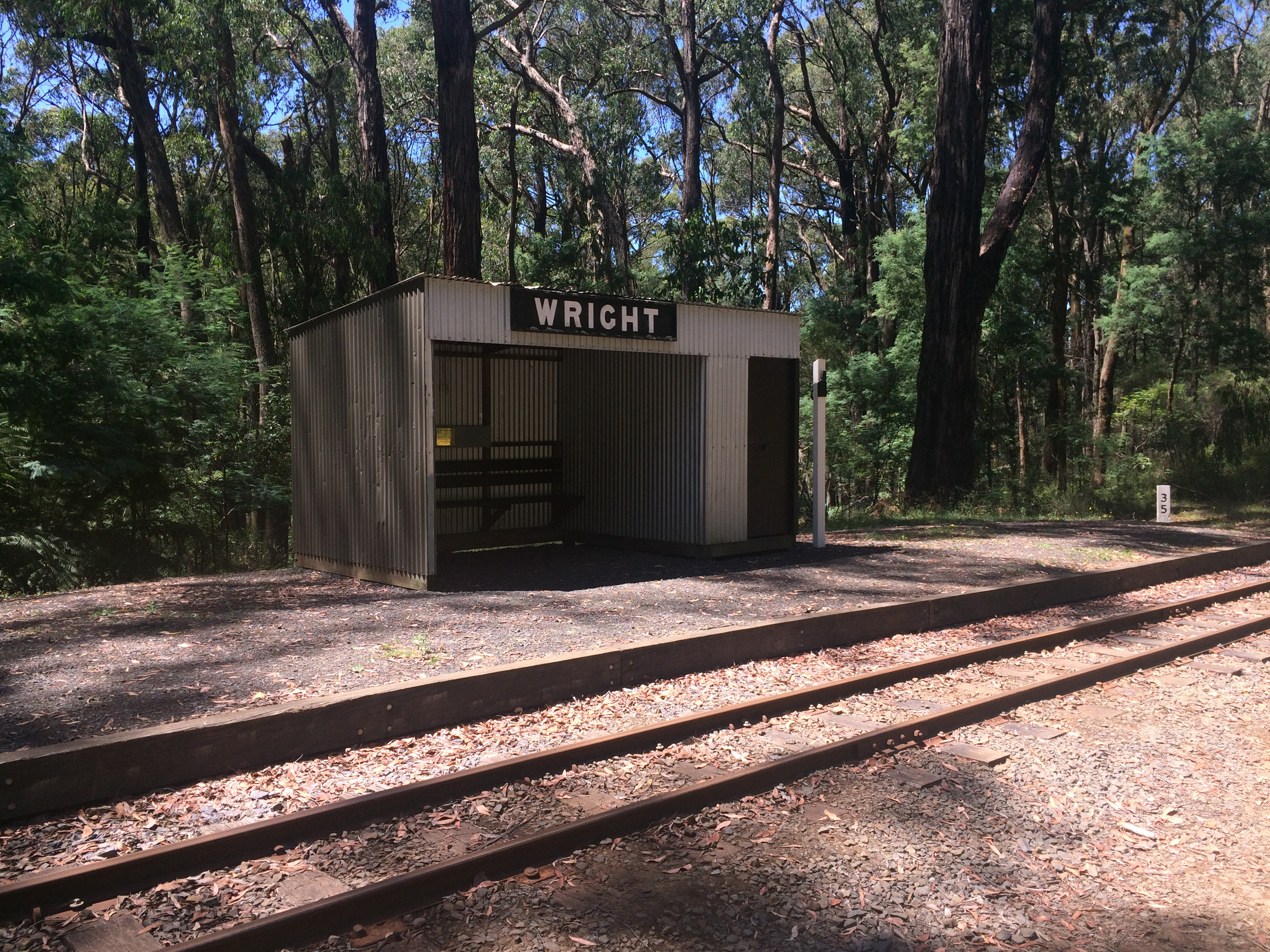
- Wright station and platform, January 2022.

General information
- Location: Railway Parade, Avonsleigh VIC 3782; Australia
- Coordinates: 37°55′45″S 145°28′14″E
- Elevation: 217 m (712 ft)
- System: Puffing Billy Railway station
- Lines: Puffing Billy Railway; Gembrook railway line (former)
- Distance: 56.43 km (35.06 mi) from Flinders Street
- Platforms: 1
- Tracks: 1

Other information
- Status: Unstaffed

History
- Opened: 24 October 1904; 122 years ago

Services
Preceding station	Puffing Billy Railway	Following station
Lakeside towards Belgrave	Gembrook line	Cockatoo towards Gembrook
Former services
Preceding station	VicRail	Following station
Lakeside towards Upper Ferntree Gully	Gembrook line	Cockatoo towards Gembrook
Location

Wright railway station is a narrow-gauge tourist heritage railway station operated by the Puffing Billy Railway in Victoria, Australia. Located on the border between Avonsleigh and Cockatoo—towns on the periurban fringe of Greater Melbourne—it opened on 24 October 1904 as a wayside station on the Gembrook line. After the line's official closure in April 1954, Wright remained closed until the Puffing Billy service was extended to terminate at Gembrook on 18 October 1998.

The station consists of a single very short side platform with a small corrugated iron shelter shed. The contemporary shelter is a replica of the original, rebuilt in 1999; the station was reconstructed again by volunteers between 2018 and 2019. Wright is 56.43 km (35.06 mi) by rail from Flinders Street Station, between the stations at Lakeside and Cockatoo. It has no nearby public transport connections, and trains do not normally stop there except by prior arrangement.

== Description ==
Wright station is located in the Wright Forest in Greater Melbourne's periurban fringe, near Wright Road at the border between the towns of Avonsleigh and Cockatoo. Because of its forest location, it is mostly nearby hiking tracks and natural features. The station is one of few in Victoria not belonging to VicTrack; instead, it is owned and operated by the Puffing Billy Railway Board, and is serviced by heritage steam locomotives on the Puffing Billy Railway. Located 56.43 km (35.06 mi) from Flinders Street Station and 14.39 km (8.94 mi) from the start of its line in Belgrave, it lies between Lakeside station (up-line towards Belgrave) and Cockatoo station (down-line towards Gembrook).

Wright station in 2026, taken from across the track.

Wright consists of a short platform with a gravel and dirt surface. A strip of wood separates the platform edge from the tracks. The only structure on the platform is a Victorian Railways "Corrugated Iron Shelter Shed and Store," also known as a Mallee shed; it includes a covered seat protected from wind and rain, and a small lockable office or storage room. If the reconstruction used the materials in the original plan, this indicates that the timber touching the ground should be sawn Red Gum, while the rest would be sawn hardwood. A name board is affixed to the Mallee shed, and a former lamp post still stands beside it; inside the shelter is a plaque acknowledging the volunteers involved in the station's 2018–19 reconstruction.

Like many small stations on the Puffing Billy Railway, Wright is notably inaccessible. The platform can be reached from the road via a short dirt path. There is minimal parking available, with space for only a few cars near the level crossing on Wright Road. There are no nearby public transport connections, but walkers and cyclists can reach the station on trails including the Eastern Dandenong Ranges Trail (colloquially, the Puffing Billy Trail).

== History ==
=== Original service ===
Wright opened on 24 October 1904 as part of the Gembrook railway line as "Wright's", a minor stopping place announced less than a month before it started receiving passengers. It was named for John W. and Anna Wright, the couple owning the nearby Avonsleigh guesthouse. When it opened, there was no road access to the station. By March 1905, residents had contributed ₤125 towards constructing one, leading the council to agree to carry out the project and build what became Wright Road, connecting the station to Avonsleigh.

Through the second half of the 1910s, there were several further discussions regarding the roads around the station. In March, the Fern Tree Gully Shire Council acceded to E. W. Hubbard's request to install crossing gates at the adjacent road; however, the Wright Road level crossing was not shown in references from 1917, nor the grades chart from 1927. In 1919, several petitions and counter-petitions debated a proposal dating back at least to 1917 to build a road (likely now Wright Track) connecting Wright Station to the Beaconsfield Road in Cockatoo (now Bailey Road and Paternoster Road). Proponents suggested it would "lessen the distance between Emerald and Cockatoo by nearly two miles" and open 200–300 acres (81–121 ha) of government land to be developed as housing, while opponents cited construction and maintenance costs and the grade of the involved terrain. The council carried the proposal to put out tenders to build the second road following the encouragement of Councillor Archibald Victor Nobelius, son of the owner of the nearby Gembrook Nurseries. Work on the road did not conclude until at the earliest 1924.

Tourist map of Dandenong Ranges, Fern Tree Gully and Gembrook district from 1926, cropped to focus on the roads around Wright railway station and Cockatoo

After the First World War, Carl Axel Nobelius' nursery business invested in a plantation of over forty hectares (approximately one hundred acres) of flax in an area nearby Wright, with a processing mill on site. In 1921, there was an unsuccessful proposal for the construction of a goods siding at Wright to serve the mill. At this time, Wright was also the station on the Gembrook least visited by tourists, by a wide margin; statistics from 1919 record only 74 outward-travelling city visitors to Wright that year.

In February 1926—weeks before the Black Sunday bushfires—a small fire started at Wright station that became part of a larger destructive incident destroying many homes in Cockatoo. On 21 July 1928, newspapers reported that the body of 27-year-old William Leonard Greening had been discovered on the platform of Wright station, following his suicide by poisoning. In 1931, a flood destroyed a bridge on the Wright-Cockatoo Road, once again limiting access to the station from the south; it was not repaired until 1933.

Wright station came under threat in 1948, when proposals to broaden the Gembrook line suggested rerouting it in a manner that would necessitate closing the Wright and Nobelius stations. These plans did not go ahead, but by April 1954 Wright had closed regardless, alongside the rest of its line. Following a landslide between Selby and Menzies Creek and years of escalating losses, Victorian Railways resolved that it would be better to close the line than to clear the blockage to reopen it. Following its closure, the site fell into disrepair, and by the 1990s, little trace of Wright remained.

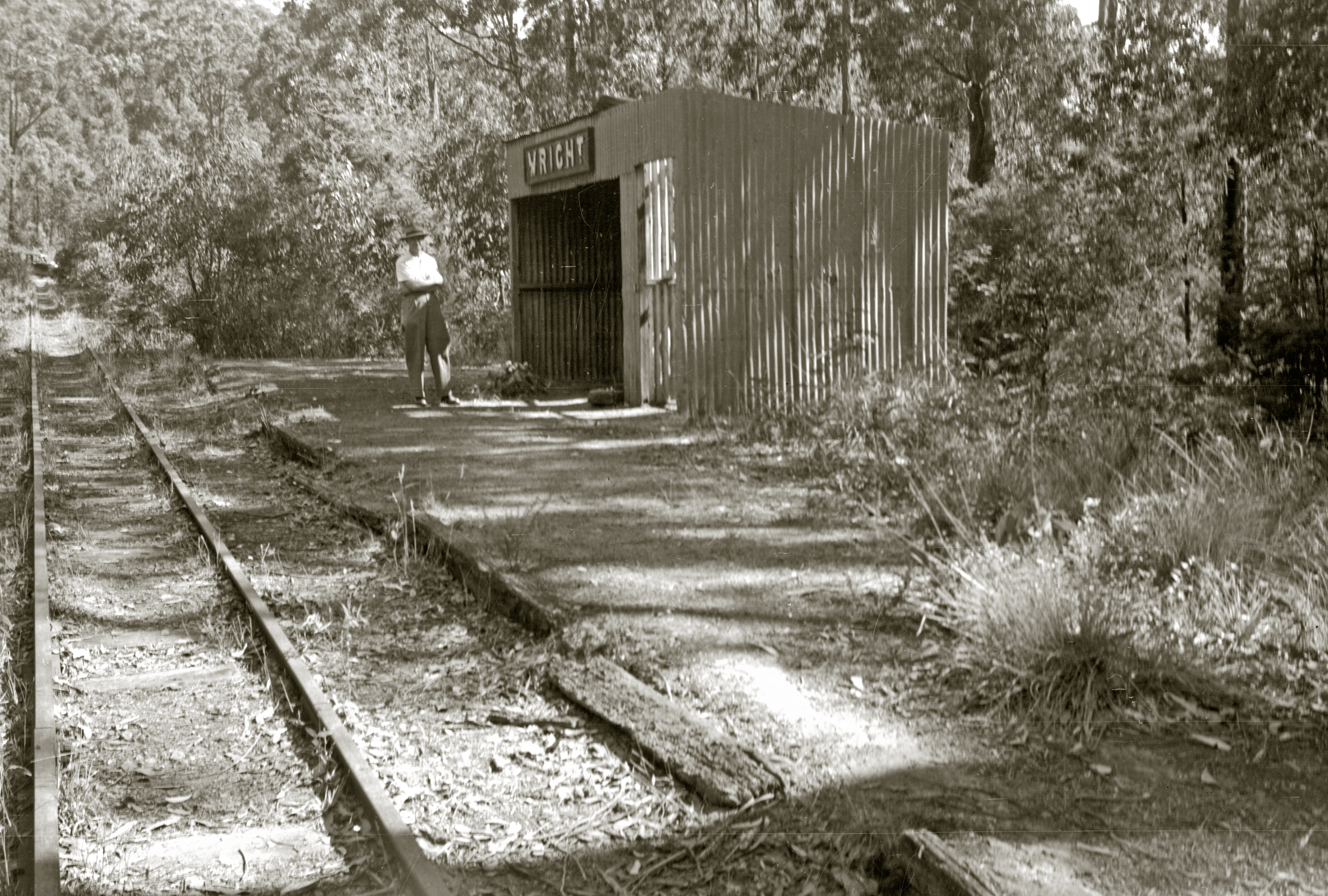
Wright railway station in 1958 after its closure, the platform and building in the process of falling into disrepair

=== Preservation ===
By the 1990s, efforts were being made to extend the restored Puffing Billy Railway service—then controlled by the Emerald Tourist Railway Board—to the entire length of the original line by rebuilding the line from the then-terminus at Lakeside through to Gembrook. Wright was officially re-opened with the line's restoration on 18 October 1998, though without a substantial structure. A replica of the original shed installed by Ray Williams in 1999.

In 2018 and 2019, a group of sixteen volunteers worked to again reconstruct the station, completing the project and opening the contemporary Wright Station in October 2019. Boom barriers were provided at the Wright Road level crossing on 20 February 2025, worked by predictor circuitry with a time-out function if the crossing has been active for too long. If this triggers, for example in the case of a train having stopped at the platform, the crossing can be manually activated.

== Platforms and services ==
Wright station has one side platform. It is served by the Puffing Billy Railway, a heritage railway running steam locomotives as a tourist service. In ordinary circumstances, Puffing Billy tickets passing Wright station can only be purchased as return journeys departing from and returning to Belgrave. As a tourist line, tickets are significantly more expensive than commuter public transit, and must be purchased in advance. The train does not typically stop at Wright, though this can occur in special circumstances and may be possible to arrange such as through a chartered train.
