= Gembrook =

Coordinates: 37°57′00″S 145°32′28″E

- Town
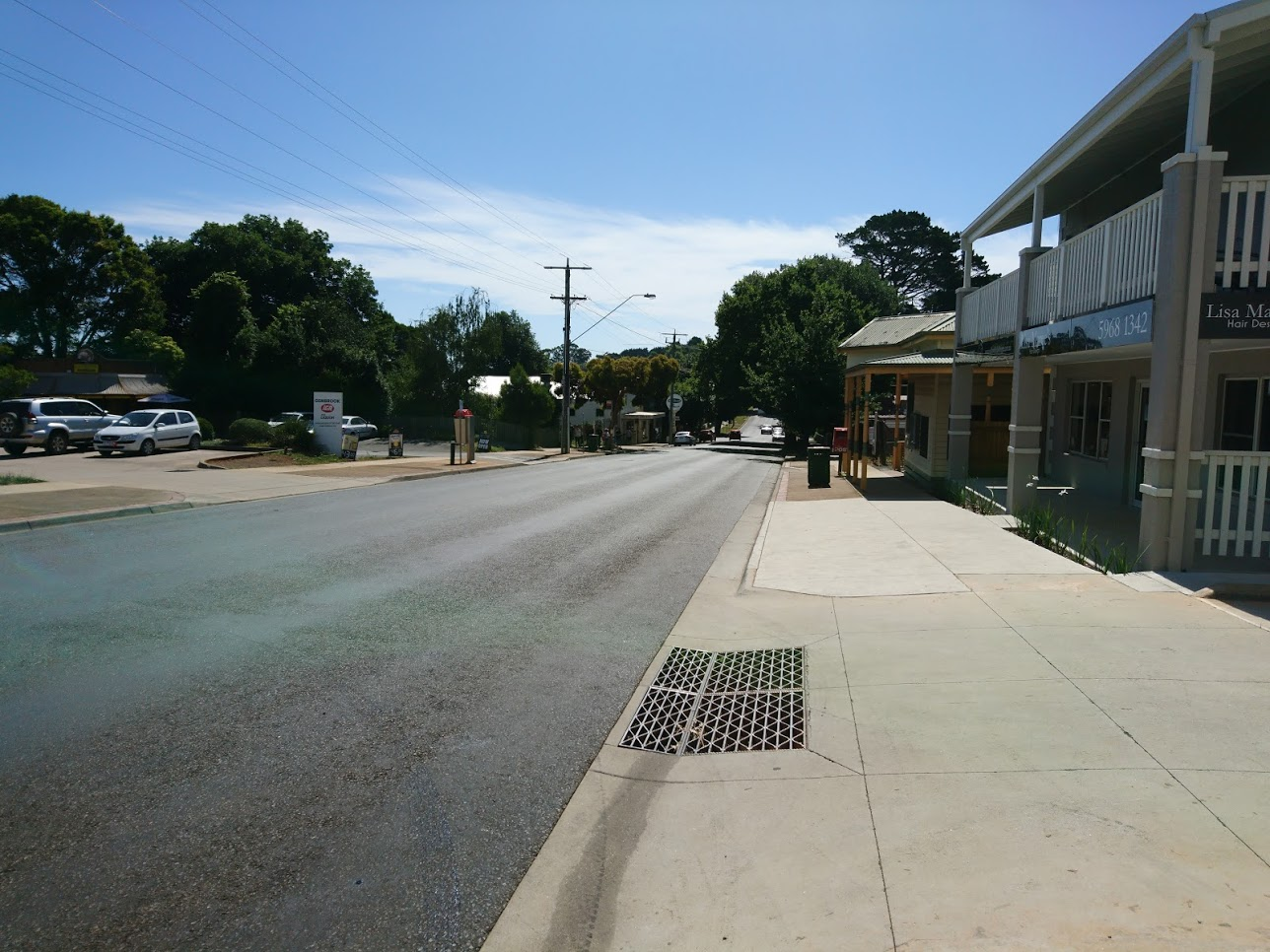
- A westbound view of Gembrook's Main street, where most of Gembrook's commercial and residential districts are located near.
- Interactive map of Gembrook
- Country: Australia
- State: Victoria
- LGA: Shire of Cardinia
- Location: 65 km (40 mi) from Melbourne; 24 km (15 mi) from Belgrave; 35 km (22 mi) from Narre Warren; 29 km (18 mi) from Berwick
- Established: 1873; 153 years ago

Government
  - State electorates: Monbulk; Narracan
  - Federal division: La Trobe

Area
  - Total: 202 km^{2} (78 sq mi)
- Elevation: 259 m (850 ft)

Population
  - Total: 2,559 (2021 census)
  - Density: 12.67/km^{2} (32.81/sq mi)
- Postcode: 3783
Localities around Gembrook
Nangana	Hoddles Creek	Hoddles Creek
Cockatoo	Gembrook	Labertouche
Mount Burnett	Pakenham Upper	Nar Nar Goon North

Gembrook is a town in Victoria, Australia, situated 65 kilometres (40 mi) south-east of Melbourne's Central Business District, within the Shire of Cardinia local government area. At the 2021 census, Gembrook recorded a population of 2,559.

Nestled on the edge of the Dandenong Ranges, Gembrook is a popular day-trip and weekend destination for Melburnians, offering a scenic retreat less than 1.5 hours’ drive from the city.

== History ==
Gembrook was settled in 1873 for farming and timber; the surrounding countryside was suitable for both dairy and orchards. Timber provided income while farms were established. The name Gembrook came from the small gems that were found in small creeks and watercourses in the surrounding area.

The Post Office opened on 5 October 1877.

=== Heritage listings ===
The following places near Gembrook are listed on the Victorian Heritage Register:

- Kurth Kiln, approximately 7 kilometres (4.3 mi) north of Gembrook, on the Tomahawk Creek, within the Kurth Kiln Regional Park
- Silverwells, 330 Ure Road, severely damaged in a March 2012 storm

== Puffing Billy railway ==
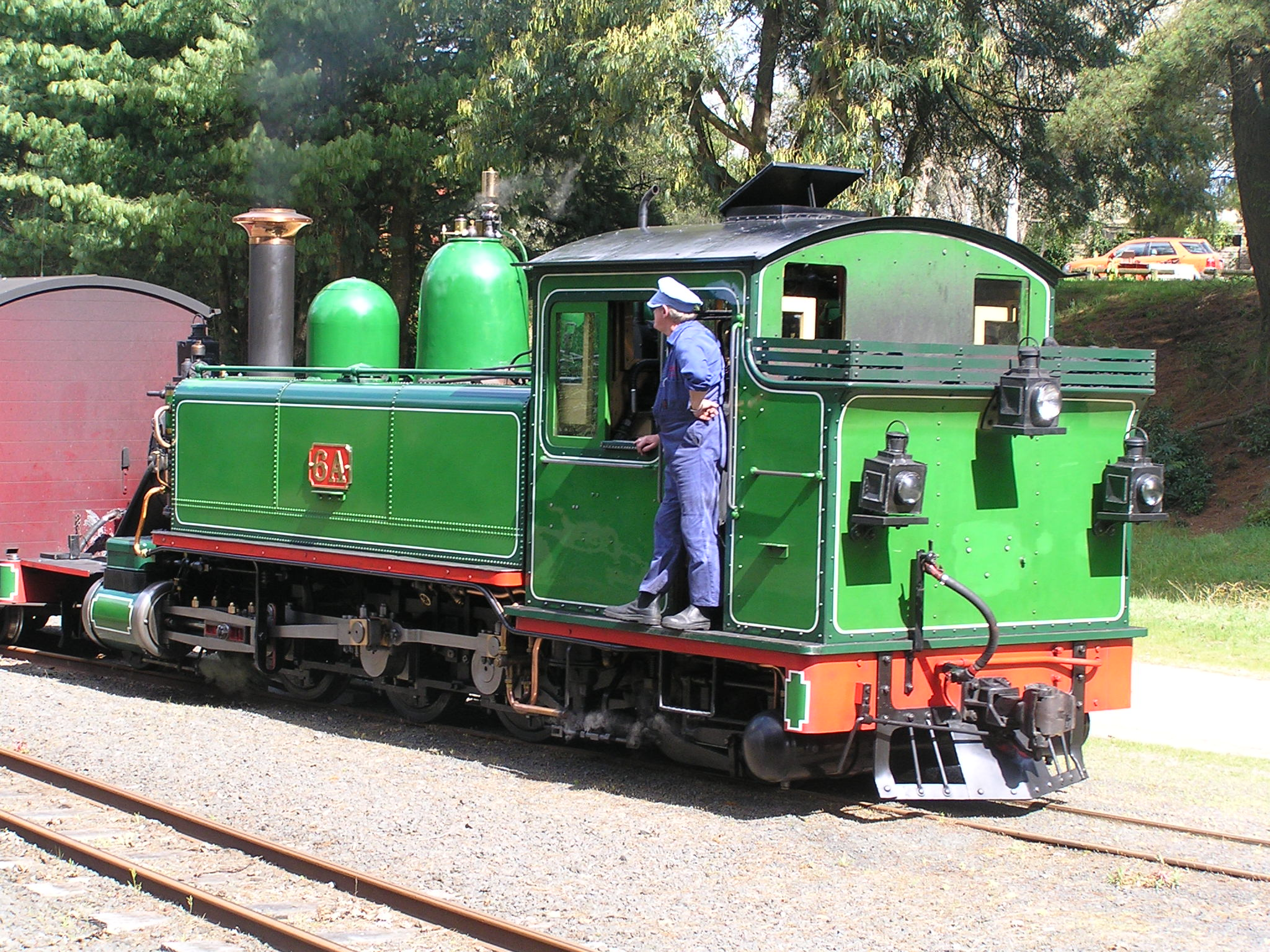
NA Class engine 6A at Gembrook.

The Gembrook railway line was opened from Upper Ferntree Gully on 18 December 1900. The narrow gauge line, these days known as Puffing Billy, brought tourists from Melbourne, as well as enabling timber and local produce, including fruit trees and potatoes, to be taken back to Melbourne. More than 20 timber mills were operating in the Gembrook area, with timber from the mills transported to the station on narrow gauge timber tramways. After the devastating fires in 1926 and 1939 which destroyed many of the timber mills, there was talk of closing the line. The line eventually closed on 30 April 1954 after a landslide blocked part of the line the previous year (the line was already in decline because motor traffic had replaced much of the railway's patronage). Soon after this time (between 1958 and 1962) the broad gauge line to Upper Ferntree Gully was extended to Belgrave which is less than 18 km away from Gembrook. In 1962, the western end of the Gembrook railway line which extended from Belgrave to Menzies Creek was reopened as a heritage tourist railway. Later extensions to Emerald in 1965, and Lakeside (in Emerald Lake Park) in 1975, were opened and finally the last section to Gembrook in 1998, which saw the complete service resume between Belgrave and Gembrook. A short section from Gembrook towards Cockatoo was gradually reopened in the early 1990s as restoration work progressed.

== Tourism ==
Tourism in the region developed as a direct result of the railway opening the area up. The Ranges Hotel originally constructed in 1894, was expanded in 1901 to cater for day trippers and excursionists from Melbourne as well as the local population. The Ranges Hotel reopened in 2017 after an extended renovation, including the sale of the hotel. On 24 September 2018 the hotel was destroyed in a fire; the site was cleared and eventually sold, and awaits redevelopment. The historic Kurth Kiln is about 7 km north of the town.

== Modern Gembrook ==
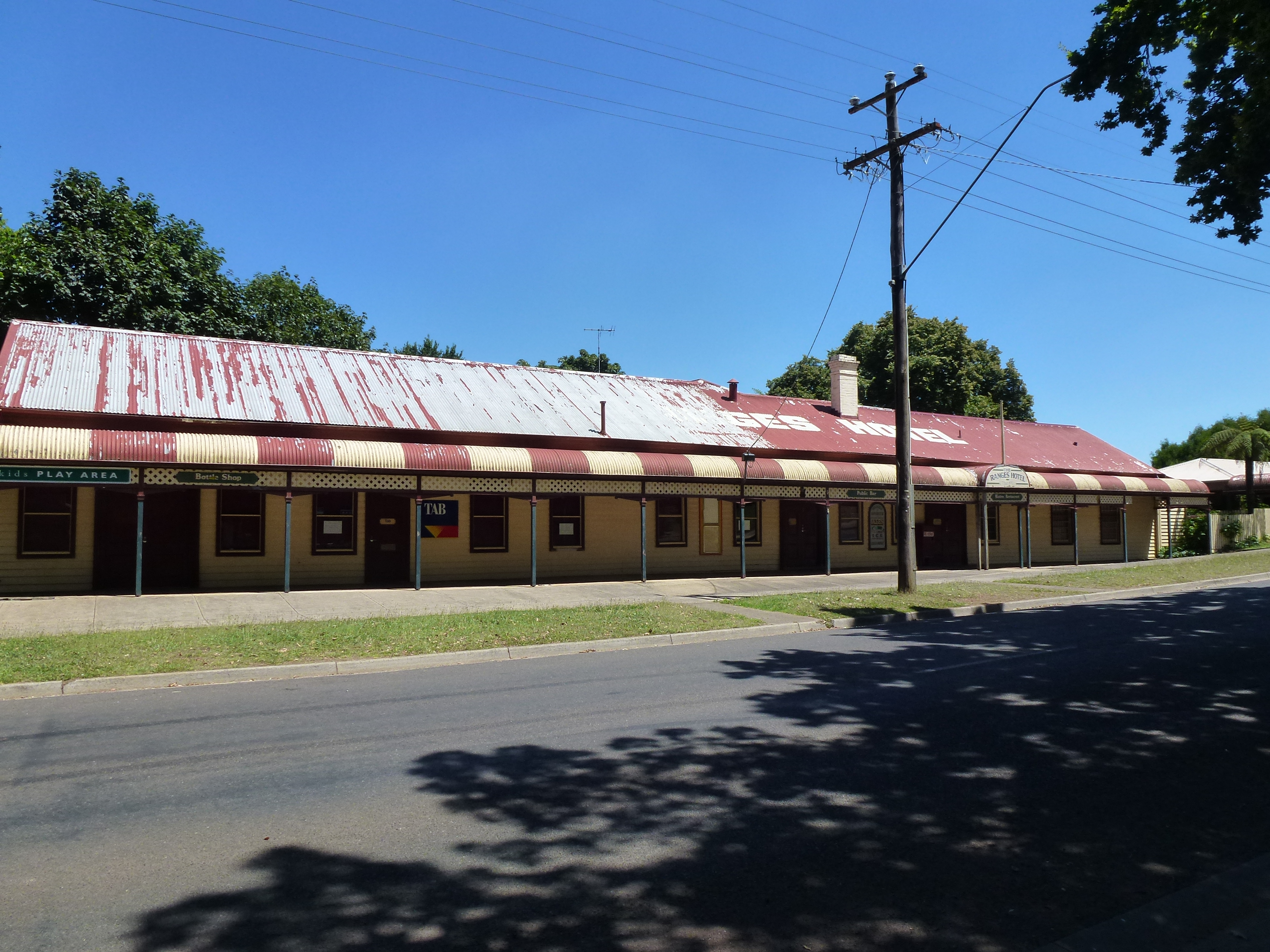
The Ranges Hotel in Gembrook in 2012, dating from 1894 — and destroyed by fire in 2018

Today Gembrook is seen by some as a suburb of Melbourne as it is within the Melbourne metropolitan area. Gembrook no longer relies on the income generated from farming and timber but rather from tourism and other professional services. The current population of Gembrook is over 2,000. The town is located within the Shire of Cardinia, and is within the state electoral area of Gembrook, and the federal electorate area of La Trobe.

Gembrook is served by a regular daily bus service running from/to Belgrave (route 695). A Friday evening and Saturday/Sunday service also runs from/to Fountain Gate shopping centre at Narre Warren (route 695F). A daily (excluding Sundays) service runs from/to Pakenham (route 840).

Together with its neighbouring township Cockatoo, Gembrook has an Australian Rules football team (Gembrook Cockatoo) competing in the Yarra Valley Mountain District Football League.

Gembrook is known as a major winemaking region, containing several well-known wineries.

The town is also home to the Gillwell Park Scout Camp one of the largest scout camps in the southern hemisphere.

Gembrook is served by a volunteer CFA fire brigade, with the station located on Innes Road.

== See also ==
- Shire of Pakenham — Gembrook was previously within this former local government area.
- Puffing Billy Railway
- Electoral district of Gembrook
