= Monomeith homestead =

Heritage-listed homestead in Melbourne, Victoria, Australia

- Location of the former homestead in Greater Metropolitan Melbourne
- Alternative names: Old Monomeith homestead
- Etymology: Bunurong: 'good', 'pleasant', or 'agreeable'

General information
- Status: Built; poor condition
- Type: Homestead (former)
- Architectural style: Old Colonial
- Location: 405 Monomeith Road, Monomeith, Shire of Cardinia, Melbourne, Victoria, Australia
- Coordinates: 38°11′49″S 145°32′11″E
- Completed: 1860; 166 years ago
- Client: Alexander Mickle
- Owner: Glassock family (c. 1890– )

Technical details
- Material: Weatherboard; galvanised iron; timber
- Grounds: 1,791 ha (4,425 acres) (1870s); 244 ha (603 acres) (1890); 449 ha (1,110 acres) (2025)

Victorian Heritage Register
- Official name: Monomeith homestead
- Type: Registered place
- Designated: 8 August 1979
- Reference no.: H0452
- Heritage overlay no.: HO77
- Categories: Farming and Grazing; Residential buildings (private)

Register of the National Estate
- Official name: Old Monomeith Homestead
- Type: Defunct register
- Designated: 22 June 1983
- Reference no.: 5873

The Monomeith homestead, also called the Old Monomeith homestead, or simply, Old Monomeith, is a former homestead located at 405 Monomeith Road, (Note: A property, known as the Monomeith Farm, with its structures built in c. 1890, is located at 490 Monomeith Road, that is likely a 229 ha (565-acre) subdivision from the original Yallock Estate / Monomeith Estate; however, it does not contain the 1860s homestead.) Monomeith, in the Shire of Cardinia, in the outer eastern suburbs of Melbourne, in Victoria, Australia.

Built in 1860 on the traditional lands of the Bunurong people, the former homestead was added to the Victorian Heritage Register on 8 August 1979 in recognition of its historical and architectural significance; and was also added to non-statutory lists by the Victorian branch of the National Trust on 26 November 1981 and the now defunct Register of the National Estate on 22 June 1983.

== History ==
A vast area of land on the northern side of Westernport Bay was, during the early nineteenth century, dominated by the stock agent partnership of Mickle, Bakewell and Lyall, operating under the name of Westernport Stations. The property was part of the Yallock Estate pre-emptive run taken up in 1839 by Robert Jamieson.

In 1856, the land holding of the Yallock Estate were divided amongst the partners, with John Mickle taking, amongst other blocks, the Monomeith block. Mickle returned to Scotland and, in 1857, his younger brother Alexander arrived from Scotland with his wife Agnes and they managed the Yallock Estate and Monomeith properties. In 1860, Alexander and Agnes, with their infant son David, moved to a new home at the Monomeith homestead and their second child, Margaret, was born there soon after. Some 1,100 hectares (2,719 acres) of the Yallock Estate were purchased by Henry Beattie in May 1875.

Alexander Mickle died at the homestead in November 1861 and his second son was born four weeks later. Agnes Mickle subsequently married her late husband's cousin, Andrew Hudson, and they continued to live at Monomeith, managing the property in conjunction with William Lyall. In 1868, the family shifted out of Monomeith to their new homestead at "Protector Park". There is no evidence of anyone living at the property until 1873, when Patrick and James Gill leased the 1,791-hectare (4,425-acre) property. In 1880, the Gills entered into a financing arrangement with the Hon. James Francis MLA, and purchased the property. Following Patrick Gill's death in 1886, the property was broken up into eighteen farming blocks and 47 building blocks for the railway township of Monomeith.

The homestead was acquired by James Murphy, who sold a 244-hectare (603-acre) portion of the property in 1890 to Thomas Beaumont Waters and his son, who established on Old Monomeith the largest piggery in Australia. The Walters held a clearing sale at the property on 14 October 1892 and around that time to property was acquired by Herbert Thomas Glasscock; and his relatives held the property until 2025. The homestead, set on 449 hectares (1,110 acres) and operating as a dairy farm, was believed to have been sold in 2025.

== Description ==
The house, near present day Cranbourne, was a five-roomed weatherboard single-storey residence with encircling verandah. Subsequent additions to the house included a billiard room and a kitchen wing. The residence was extended in 1888 in matching Old Colonial vernacular style. Features of the building are decorative barge boards, French doors, and the encircling verandah.

The building was an important element of the history of the area, being the earliest surviving residence in this district. As such, it demonstrates the style of settlement in the area and is closely associated with early Victorian pioneers. The building was architecturally elegant and demonstrates an interesting exercise in early timber construction.

=== Condition of the former homestead ===
As of 1980, the former homestead was abandoned and virtually derelict. The weatherboard structure, although essentially intact, was no longer maintained and was affected by termite infestation and rot. As of May 1981, the Historic Buildings Council (HBC) advised that the building is in a very advanced stage of deterioration.

In November 1991 the HBC prepared a conservation strategy plan in which the homestead was described as dilapidated, but basically sound condition. The main areas of concern were that a cypress tree was too close to the building with one branch resting on the roof; stumps had rotted away, especially around the perimeter, allowing the building to settle around the edges; the encircling verandah structure had rotted and collapsed, leaving the floor exposed and damaging the structure; bees, possums and birds entered the building and were damaging some finishes; minor general carpentry work was required around the outside walls such as weatherboards and flashings; the roof appeared to be relatively sound.

== See also ==
- Architecture of Melbourne
- Koo-Wee-Rup Swamp
- List of places on the Victorian Heritage Register in the Shire of Cardinia
