= E. E. Kurth =

Ernest Edgar Kurth
- Born: 1 November 1895; Broken Hill, Australia
- Died: 4 January 1966 (aged 70)
- Resting place: Cornelian Bay, Tasmania

Ernest Edgar Kurth, also known as E. E. Kurth, is best known for his work at the University of Tasmania with investigations into the chemical constitution and properties of Tasmanian and New South Wales oil shales, for which he was awarded the degree of Doctor of Science in 1934. During WWII he gave special attention to the pyrolysis of timber and its trace elements. He was author of several papers on the subject and held a patent for improvements to charcoal kilns.

== Personal life ==
E. E. Kurth was born on 1 November 1895 in Broken Hill, Australia. His parents were Friedrich Ernst Kurth and Emma Ceaserina, née Muller. He married Irene Saunders in 1924 and they had four children: two boys, Dudley and Geoffrey and two girls, Shirley and Dorothy. Kurth died on 4 January 1966 and is buried in the Cornelian Bay, Tasmania.

== Schooling ==
Kurth was raised in the West Australian gold fields and attended the Daveyhurst Primary School from 1899 to 1907 and the Scotch College Secondary School in Claremont, West Australia. From 1911 to 1915 Kurth studied at the Western Australian School of Mines, Kalgoorlie, qualified for the Associateship in Metallurgy and in 1915 held the position of demonstrator in Chemistry.

=== Early Career Positions ===
After gaining experience in assaying chemicals at the Oroya Links Ltd plant in Kalgoorlie, Kurth was awarded a Robert Falconer Research Scholarship for research into iron corrosion on water supplies. From 1916 to 18 he joined the Sons of Gwalia Ltd Gold Mine at Gwalia, WA, and in 1918 moved to Hobart, Tasmania, where he first worked as a research chemist for the Electrolytic Zinc Co. in the early stages of its establishment at Risdon, and then joined the staff of the Hobart Technical College.

=== University Positions ===
In 1923 Kurth was appointed Lecturer at the University of Tasmania in applied chemistry and geology, and was appointed head of the chemistry department in 1924. He received his Bachelor of Science degree in 1928 and his doctorate in science in 1934 with his work on oil shale. In 1941 he became foundation professor at the newly created chair of chemistry at the university and head of the chemistry department at the Hobart Technical College, a position he held until his retirement in 1960. Kurth became Dean of the Faculty of Science in 1946 and designed the new chemistry building at Sandy Bay. Following his retirement he was honoured with the title of professor emeritus, University of Tasmania.

== Professional Roles ==
1934 - Holder of the Australian Letters Patent 19231/34 for the process of manufacturing of bituminous substances by the concentration of Tasmanite Oil Shale. 1924-1937 - Referee Analyst for Government on commercial interests on liquors, foods, oils, bitumen, alloys, soils, fish product and other items and was a member of the State Development Advisory Board. 1935 - His investigation into the Smithton Dolomite Deposits resulted in the formation of the Magnesium Products Ltd company. 1940 - Applied for Patent for an improved, continuously working charcoal kiln to produce consistent quality charcoal as a motor fuel substitute for petrol. Built a quarter-size prototype kiln at Dover, Tasmania. 1941 - granted Charcoal Kiln Patent No 2563/41 titled: ″Improvement in and connected with charcoal kilns″. Supervise construction of a 25-ton capacity kiln at Gembrook, Victoria Australia. The kiln was completed in 1942 and first fired on 18 March that year and decommissioned in 1945.

The kiln, now known as Kurth Kiln, is a landmark in the area and was added to the Victoria Heritage Register in 2008 under H2012.

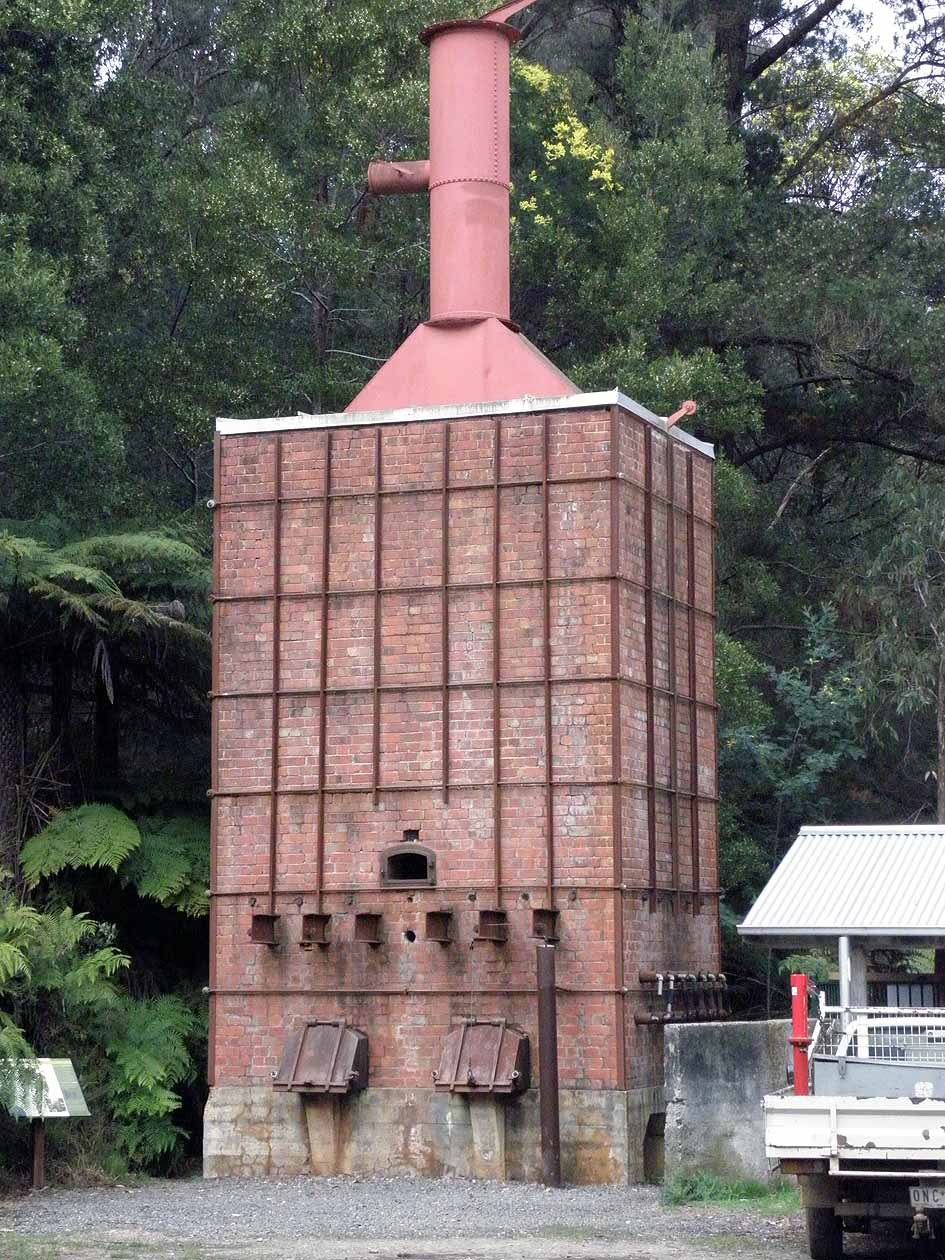

== Sources ==
- Journal and Proceedings of the Royal Chemical Institute, Vol 33, 1968
- University of Tasmania IN FOCUS Graduate Newspaper, September 1987
- ″E. E. Kurth and his work, Reflections on a Creative Life″ pp32–34. ISBN 978-0-9807615-2-8
