= Bayles Bridges =

Heritage-listed bridges in Melbourne, Victoria, Australia

- Coordinates: 38°10′45″S 145°34′25″E
- Carries: Koo Wee Rup–Longwarry Road
- Crosses: Yallock Creek; No. 4 Yallock Drain
- Locale: Bayles, Shire of Cardinia, Melbourne, Victoria, Australia
- Official name: Bayles Bridge No. 1; Bayles Bridge No. 2
- Owner: VicRoads

Characteristics
- Design: Timber piling with trough
- Material: Rolled steel
- Trough construction: Timber
- Pier construction: Timber
- Total length: 1. 64.6 m (212 ft); 2. 74 m (243 ft)
- Longest span: 9 m (30 ft)
- No. of spans: 1. 7; 2. 8

History
- Designer: Country Roads Board; State Rivers and Water Supply Commission
- Construction end: 1950; 76 years ago

Statistics

Victorian Heritage Register
- Official name: Bayles Bridge No. 1 and No. 2
- Type: Registered place
- Designated: 18 November 1999
- Reference no.: H1852
- Heritage overlay no.: HO141
- Category: Transport - Road

Register of the National Estate
- Official name: Bayles Road Bridge
- Type: Defunct register
- Designated: undated
- Reference no.: 102766

Location
- Interactive map of Bayles Bridges

The Bayles Bridges, officially called the Bayles Bridge No. 1 and the Bayles Bridge No. 2, are two road bridges that carry the Koo Wee Rup–Longwarry Road across the Yallock Creek, located near Bayles, in the Shire of Cardinia, in the outer eastern suburbs of Melbourne, in Victoria, Australia.

Built in 1950 on the traditional lands of the Bunurong people, the bridges were added to the Victorian Heritage Register on 18 November 1999 in recognition of their historical and scientific (technical) significance; and, on unknown dates, were also added to the non-statutory and now defunct Register of the National Estate and to a non-statutory local government list by the Shire of Cardinia.

== History ==
The draining of the Koo-Wee-Rup Swamp was a significant nineteenth and early twentieth century project to reclaim farming land of the outer eastern outskirts of Melbourne. After many failures, the reclaimed land supplied much of Victoria’s rapidly-growing metropolitan population with dairy and market garden produce by the mid-twentieth century. The bridges were part of the infrastructure works carried out on the swamp during the period of post-war reconstruction. The Bayles Bridges are the largest and most impressive bridges of the region, specifically designed for the swamp conditions. The bridges were a Victorian Government, rather than a municipal project, carried out by the Country Roads Board in conjunction with the State Rivers and Water Supply Commission. The bridges were amongst the last major timber bridges to be constructed in Victoria, with prefabricated concrete structures predominating thereafter.

The timber decking on both of the bridges was replaced in 2007.

== Description ==
The twin timber-and-steel bridges, popularly known as the Bayles Bridges, built in 1950, consists of two adjacent bridges over Yallock Creek and No. 4 Yallock Drain, on the road between Koo Wee Rup to Longwarry. The bridges cross two major drainage channels of a complex drainage network in typical Koo-Wee-Rup Swamp terrain. They are situated adjacent to a proclaimed fauna reserve for swamp wildlife, just outside the township of Bayles.

The bridges are constructed of rolled steel joists on timber piers, with standard Country Roads Board longitudinal-timber decks and side rails. The bridges are of seven spans, 64.6 metres (212 ft) long and eight spans, 74 metres (243 ft) long; with individual steel joist spans of just over nine metres (thirty feet). They have several increasingly uncommon structural features, being the steel crossheads on the timber piles, and the rare dual layers of timber decking, transverse below and longitudinal above. Timber piers were preferred to concrete because they performed better in unstable swamp subsoils, but in such perpetually-damp contexts steel joists and crossheads ensured a longer working life for heavy-duty timber decks.

== See also ==
- List of bridges in Melbourne
- List of places on the Victorian Heritage Register in the Shire of Cardinia
