= Cockatoo railway station =

Railway station in Victoria, Australia

Cockatoo
- Cockatoo station, November 2026

General information
- Location: Pakenham Rd & McBride St, Cockatoo VIC 3781; Australia
- Coordinates: 37°56′05″S 145°29′29″E
- Elevation: 189 m (620 ft)
- System: Puffing Billy Railway station
- Lines: Puffing Billy Railway; Gembrook railway line (former)
- Distance: 58.44 km (36.31 mi) from Flinders Street
- Platforms: 1
- Tracks: 2

Other information
- Status: Unstaffed

History
- Opened: 18 December 1900; 125 years ago
- Former names: Devon; Cockatoo Creek

Services
| Preceding station | Puffing Billy Railway | Following station |
|---|---|---|
| Wright towards Belgrave | Gembrook line | Fielder towards Gembrook |
Former services
| Preceding station | VicRail | Following station |
|---|---|---|
| Wright towards Upper Ferntree Gully | Gembrook line | Fielder towards Gembrook |
Location

Cockatoo railway station is a narrow-gauge tourist heritage railway station operated by the Puffing Billy Railway in Cockatoo, Victoria, Australia. It opened with the Gembrook line as Devon on 18 December 1900, but was renamed Cockatoo Creek on 29 July 1901 and subsequently shortened to Cockatoo on 2 May 1904. After the line's official closure in April 1954, Cockatoo remained closed until the Puffing Billy service was extended to terminate at Gembrook on 18 October 1998. Cockatoo is 58.44 km (36.31 mi) by rail from Flinders Street Station, between the stations at Wright and Fielder.

The station originally included a platform road and a loop siding, with a crossing loop was later added between the two. A single 12ft x 20ft timber portable station building, later extended, was provided. Other associated buildings such as toilets and a van good shed were also on the platform while a weatherboard goods shed was present on the loop siding. The original structure was destroyed by the 1983 Ash Wednesday bushfires.

Today, the loop siding has been rebuilt along with the platform track, but the crossing loop remains absent. The platform initially had a temporary non-heritage building provided for safe working purposes only, but in 2007 a heritage Victorian Railways building obtained second-hand from another station was installed at Cockatoo. Whilst trains normally stop at Cockatoo, very few passengers join or alight. There are plans in place to recreate the original station building configuration, but there is currently no clear time-frame in place for the project.

== Description ==
Cockatoo station is located near the centre of Cockatoo, a periurban town on the eastern fringe of Greater Melbourne, Victoria. It is adjacent to the Ash Wednesday Bushfire Education Centre and St. Luke's Anglican church, near the intersection of McBride Street and Pakenham Road. The station is one of few in Victoria not belonging to VicTrack; instead, it is owned and operated by the Puffing Billy Railway Board, and is serviced by heritage steam locomotives on the Puffing Billy Railway. Located 58.44 km (36.31 mi) from Flinders Street Station and 17.3 km (10.8 mi) from the start of its line in Belgrave, it lies between Wright station (up-line towards Belgrave) and Fielder station (down-line towards Gembrook).

Cockatoo station in November 2026, looking at the station building and sign

Cockatoo station consists of one side platform with a gravel surface, bearing one small heritage railway building—a Victorian Railways standard portable, painted with a dark terracotta dado and light buff upper section—and a locked corrugated iron lamp room. The platform is bounded by a white wooden fence, and fitted with several wooden picnic benches for visitors. The platform is also decorated with a name-sign and several wooden planter boxes. There are two tracks beside the station, a loop siding and the main line. To access Cockatoo station from the town centre, it is necessary to cross two roads and navigate a short gravel or dirt path, rendering it somewhat inaccessible.

== History ==
=== Original service ===
Prior to the construction of the railway, Cockatoo was the most isolated of the towns originally on the line; transport there was limited by low-quality, seasonably inaccessible tracks, and its first store had only been established in 1895. The station—then named 'Devon'—opened with the line on 18 December 1900, featuring a standard corrugated iron 'Mallee' shelter shed. By 29 July 1901, it had been renamed to Cockatoo Creek in order to avoid confusion by reflecting the popular name for the settlement at the time, and on 2 May 1904 it was officially shortened to the contemporary Cockatoo. It appears that Cockatoo Creek had been the originally intended name, replaced by Devon shortly before the line opened and quickly returned after activism from residents following confusion with another station of the same name. Soon after the line opened, the town began to grow; by 1902, George Simmons—owner of the 1895 store—had opened a coffee palace, store, and post office on the eastern side of the creek, pioneering Cockatoo's eventual main street. James McBride purchased Simmons' business around 1902 and had opened another store near the railway crossing by 1903.

The train allowed Cockatoo to import tourists and export goods at a much greater scale; through the first decades of Cockatoo station's existence, the unbuilt land around it was subdivided and transformed into guesthouses, stores, and cottagers for visitors (though Cockatoo is said to have remained a quieter style of retreat). In the 1901–2 financial year soon after the line opened, Cockatoo was the terminal for 252 tonnes of goods exported. These quantities grew in part as it began to facilitate the export of large quantities of potatoes produced in the nearby Mount Burnett, representing a significant proportion of its 2041 tonnes exported in the 1910-11 financial year. Cockatoo was built with a loop siding (later track No. 3) serving a wooden goods shed, part of a larger goods yard.

A 1910 diagram demonstrating an unsuccessful proposal to install catch blades where Cockatoo's horse-drawn tramway crossed the Gembrook railway line.

In 1906, J. J. Bell & Sons opened a wooden-railed horse-drawn tramway running from Cockatoo station, beginning opposite the platform—beside the goods shed—and following the course of the Cockatoo Creek before terminating near Paternoster Road after approximately 5 km (3 mi). This infrastructure was established at a time when the carting of timber on the roads to Cockatoo station during winter had been prohibited by the local council, which was concerned about damage to the roads from heavy timber payloads. Tramways allowed producers to transport their timber for export without damaging or relying on the roads. In 1910, it was proposed that signals and catch blades be installed where the tramway crossed the rail line, but these plans were never implemented. The tramway was still running in 1914, and it is unclear when it ceased operation.

A caretaker was placed in charge of the station on 7 May, 1913. Before 1917, a more substantial wooden portable station building had been installed, which in the 1920s was extended with a second Victorian Railways portable. A fruit stall at the station operated from November 1919 until January 1922. By 15 August 1922, Cockatoo had a permanent stationmaster; it also gained a Victorian Railways Class 4 departmental residence at the down side of the station, backing onto the creek. However, by 1926 the station had returned to caretaker status. Following the First World War, a second loop siding (track No. 2) was installed to allow passing while the goods siding and main line (No. 1) were both in use.

Cockatoo railway station in 1917
