= Silverwells, Gembrook =

Heritage-listed house in Melbourne, Victoria, Australia

Silverwells
- Location of the former structures in Victoria
- Alternative names: Silver Wells

General information
- Status: Destroyed
- Type: House; stores; police cell; dairy; stables
- Architectural style: Old Colonial
- Location: 330 Ure Road, Gembrook, Shire of Cardinia, Melbourne, Victoria, Australia
- Coordinates: 37°55′09″S 145°32′53″E
- Completed: 1879; 147 years ago
- Destroyed: March 2012
- Client: John Ure

Technical details
- Structural system: Drop slab; notched log; stud frame
- Material: Timber; corrugated iron; weatherboard; bark; shingles
- Grounds: 86 ha (213 acres) (1874)

Design and construction
- Main contractor: Alexander Beau Cannon; James Brant

Victorian Heritage Register
- Official name: Silverwells
- Type: Registered place
- Designated: 11 December 1985
- Reference no.: H0611
- Heritage overlay no.: HO125
- Categories: Farming and Grazing; Parks, Gardens and Trees; Residential buildings (private)

Register of the National Estate
- Official name: Post Office (former)
- Type: Defunct register
- Designated: 21 March 1978
- Reference no.: 5860

Silverwells, also spelled as Silver Wells, was a collection of rustic structures, located at 330 Ure Road in Gembrook, in the Shire of Cardinia, in the north eastern suburbs of Melbourne, in Victoria, Australia.

Built in 1879 on the traditional lands of the Bunurong people, the house and its associated structures were added to the Victorian Heritage Register on 11 December 1985 in recognition of their historical and architectural significance; and was also added to non-statutory lists by the Victorian branch of the National Trust on 29 March 1973 and the now defunct Register of the National Estate on 21 March 1978.

A storm in March 2012 destroyed most of the structures.

== History ==
In 1874, John Ure selected 86 hectares (213 acres) and moved to Gembrook with his wife, Jane (also called Jean), and their two sons Alexander (b. 1872) and John (b. 1873), who were both born in Scotland. Another two sons, Robert (b. 1875) and James Buchanan (b. 1881) were born at Gembrook. The Ures named their property Silver Wells due to the pure water they found when they sank their first well. Silver Wells had a suite of buildings including a number of houses, machinery sheds, barns, a cheese room, dairy and boiler room. It also had a post office and a general store with a butcher's room that served the small mining community, who had come to the area to search for gold and silver. The Ures continued to operate the store, at what was called North Gembrook, until 1901 when the commercial focus of the town shifted to the area around the railway station, for the Puffing Billy Railway.

== Description ==
The complex of six buildings was located on Crown allotment 70, Parish of Gembrook, approximately five kilometres (three miles) north of the present township. They were built by Alexander Beau Cannon and James Brant for John Ure. The 1880 building provided Gembrook's first post office – at the time called Silver Wells – general store and butcher's room. An early bark hut, built about 1875 was destroyed by fire. Another dwelling was built in 1879 that has a dairy attached. Several out houses date from about this time. The third dwelling was built before 1900. A fourth was built after World War I.

The particular interest of the complex was the range of vernacular construction in the earlier buildings in an early Old Colonial style. The stables were drop slab. The original dwelling and the single-storey timber former post office building were constructed using notched logs. The dairy extension was built with split weatherboards. The third dwelling was of conventional stud frame construction with a timber verandah. The roofs were all corrugated iron. Up until the March 2012 storm, the original bark roof survived underneath the iron on the original dwelling; and shingles survived on the former post office. Notched log construction was used relatively rarely in nineteenth century Victoria and the most common use of such buildings was as lock-ups. These have ceilings of logs as well. The logs were often squared to fit more closely. The Silverwells building was therefore a rare domestic example and had rather different details. The complex of buildings was located in a most picturesque setting, under mature conifers that caused significant damage during the 2012 storm, and with the remnants of a very early garden and orchard surrounding them. There were also lean-to sections.

== See also ==
- Architecture of Melbourne
- List of places on the Victorian Heritage Register in the Shire of Cardinia
