= Nangana, Victoria =

Nangana
- Town
- Coordinates: 37°52′S 145°32′E
- Country: Australia
- State: Victoria
- LGA: Shire of Cardinia
- Location: 56 km (35 mi) E of Melbourne; 16 km (9.9 mi) NE of Cockatoo

Government
  - State electorate: Monbulk
  - Federal division: La Trobe

Population
  - Total: 54 (2021 census)
- Postcode: 3781

Nangana is a bounded rural locality 56 kilometres (35 mi) from Melbourne, in Victoria, Australia, located within the Shire of Cardinia local government area. Nangana recorded a population of 54 at the 2021 census.

The town has no post office or official town centre. Like Mount Burnett, Nangana shares its postcode (3781) with Cockatoo.

== History ==
In 1902 Post Offices named Crichton's and Nangana opened in the area. Nangana closed around 1910. Crichton's was renamed Nangana in 1918 and closed in 1964.
