= Cockatoo kindergarten =

Preschool in Melbourne, Victoria, Australia

Location
- 23 Bailey Road, Cockatoo, Shire of Cardinia, Melbourne, Victoria; Australia; 37°56′05″S 145°29′03″E

Information
- Type: Preschool
- Established: 1976; 50 years ago
- Founders: Cockatoo Community Co-operative; Shire of Cardinia
- Website: cockatookindergarten.org.au

Cockatoo kindergarten (former site)
- Interactive map of Cockatoo kindergarten (former site)
- 37°56′10″S 145°29′27″E
- Location: 2–10 McBride Street, Cockatoo

History
- Built: 1976
- Built by: Victorian Public Works Department
- Abandoned: 2005 (as a preschool)

Site notes
- Material: Steel; asbestos sheeting (removed)
- Architect: Richard Allen
- Restored: 2017 (as a memorial)
- Restored by: Shire of Cardinia; Country Fire Authority
- Condition: Good
- Current use: Memorial and education centre
- Owner: Shire of Cardinia
- Public access: Yes; weekends only

Victorian Heritage Register
- Official name: Former Cockatoo kindergarten
- Type: Registered place
- Designated: 10 May 2012
- Reference no.: H2303
- Heritage overlay no.: HO274
- Category: Education

The Cockatoo kindergarten is a preschool, located, since 2005, at 23 Bailey Road in Cockatoo, in the Shire of Cardinia, in the eastern suburbs of Melbourne, in Victoria, Australia. Operated as a cooperative, the preschool was built in 1976 in a semi-rural setting, at 2–10 McBride Street, Cockatoo. The building was impacted by the Ash Wednesday bushfires of 1983, and in 2005, the preschool was relocated to the Bailey Road site.

Located on the traditional lands of the Kulin Nation, the 1976 preschool building was added to the Victorian Heritage Register on 10 May 2012 in recognition of its historical and social significance.

Since 2017, the site was repurposed as the Ash Wednesday Bushfire Education Centre, a memorial and education centre for the Ash Wednesday fires.

== History ==
The kindergarten was built to provide facilities for the then rapidly growing population, on land provided by the local Council, using money raised by the Cockatoo Community Co-operative. The circular-plan building was designed by the Melbourne architect Richard Allen to resemble a merry-go-round.

Much of the township of Cockatoo was destroyed in the Ash Wednesday bushfires of 16 February 1983, which devastated large areas of Victoria and South Australia. The fire that affected Cockatoo started late in the day and changed direction after the wind went around to the south-west. Many local firefighters and appliances were away fighting fires elsewhere, so the township was exposed. Fires burned 1,800 hectares (4,400 acres) and destroyed 307 buildings. Six people lost their lives in and around Cockatoo.

During the fires the kindergarten building became a refuge for approximately 300 local people, almost half of whom were children. Fires came within 30 metres (98 ft) of the preschool. In the days after the fires the Red Cross used the building as a registration centre.

During their March 1983 Australian tour, Charles, Prince of Wales and Diana, Princess of Wales visited Cockatoo, and planted a flowering gum (Corymbia ficifolia, formerly Eucalyptus ficifolia) at the entrance to the kindergarten to mark the occasion.

After the Ash Wednesday fires, a second preschool was built on a site on Bailey Road, on land owned by the Uniting Church. The church building on that site was destroyed in the fires. After the Uniting Church abandoned the site, the Shire Council purchased the building. The Council operated the Bailey Road and McBride Street centres ran as one for many years and, as enrolments decreased and repairs were needed to the McBride Street site, the preschool was consolidated in 2005 at the Bailey Road site.

== Description ==
The former Cockatoo Kindergarten is located in the Alma Trelour Reserve. It is a steel-framed circular building with a low pyramidal twelve-sided roof tapering up to a central lantern, which provides light and ventilation, and has a surrounding verandah. Internally it had a large play room, office and toilet facilities. The exterior walls of the building, originally of asbestos sheeting with large areas of glass, have been removed, and some of the internal walls were also been destroyed.

The roof of the building was badly affected by the fires, and deteriorated further in the following years, resulting in 2005 in the kindergarten moving to another site.

=== Repurpose as a memorial ===
The building remained unused for several years and during this time suffered from vandalism. Council's decision to demolish the building in 2011 met with opposition from the local community, which wanted it kept as a memorial. In 2013, the Australian government announced a $500,000 grant, with a contribution of $350,000 from the Shire, and $100,000 from Heritage Victoria, to redevelop the site as a memorial to the bushfires.

Operating since 2017, the former preschool was restored and purposed as the Ash Wednesday Bushfire Education Centre, and officially opened on the occasion of the 40th anniversary of the Ash Wednesday fires, on 12 February 2023.

== See also ==
- Architecture of Melbourne
- Preschool education in Australia
- List of places on the Victorian Heritage Register in the Shire of Cardinia
