= Bunyip railway substation =

Heritage-listed electrical substation in Melbourne, Victoria, Australia

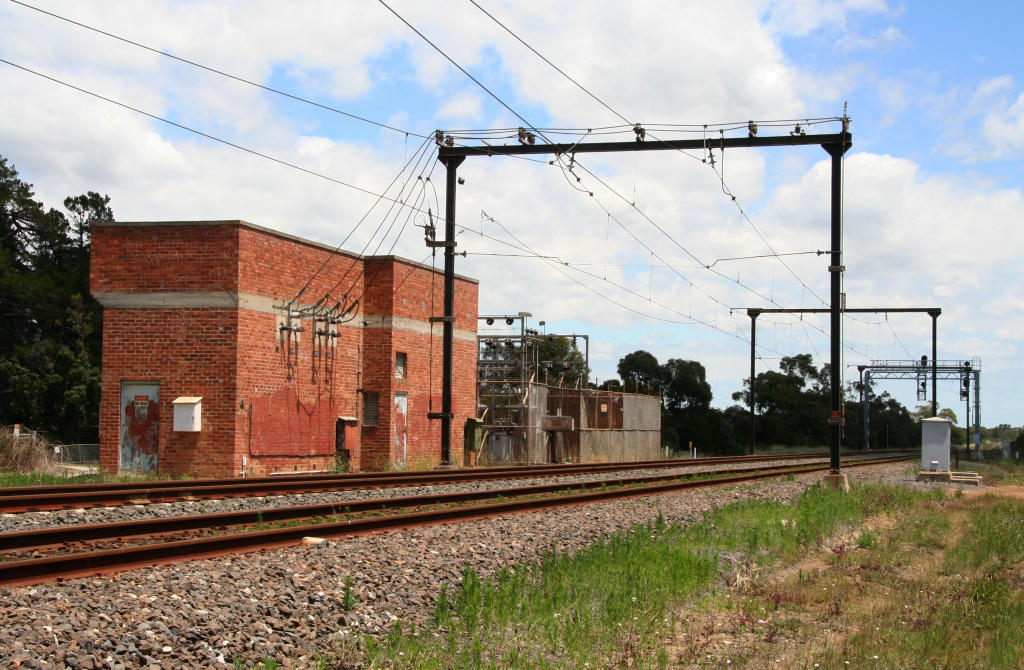
- The substation and gantries in 2008

- Location of the substation in Victoria

General information
- Status: Completed
- Type: Electrical substation
- Architectural style: Inter-War utilitarian
- Location: Nar Nar Goon-Longwarry Road, Bunyip, Shire of Cardinia, Melbourne, Victoria, Australia
- Coordinates: 38°05′55″S 145°42′45″E
- Completed: 1952; 74 years ago
- Owner: Victorian Railways

Technical details
- Material: Red bricks; concrete; concrete sheet roofing

Victorian Heritage Register
- Official name: Bunyip railway substation
- Type: Registered place
- Designated: 13 November 2003
- Reference no.: H2025
- Heritage overlay no.: HO142
- Category: Transport - Rail

The Bunyip railway substation is an electrical substation located on Nar Nar Goon-Longwarry Road in Bunyip, in the Shire of Cardinia, in the outer eastern suburbs of Melbourne, in Victoria, Australia.

Built in 1952 on the traditional lands of the Bunurong people, the substation was added to the Victorian Heritage Register on 13 November 2003 in recognition of its historic, technical, and social significance.

== History ==
The Bunyip substation was one of nineteen substations and tie stations constructed between 1952 and 1954 from Nar Nar Goon to Traralgon for the electrification of the main Gippsland line, the first main line in Australia to be electrified. The substation has a strong historical, technical, and social association with the rapid development of the Latrobe Valley and the related coal industry in the 1950s. It represents an important tangible link with the transportation of brown coal and the associated coal and briquette industry in the region that was central to the economic development of Victoria, particularly in the 1950s. The production and transportation of brown coal deposits were of fundamental importance to the domestic heating needs of many Victorian households.

The electrification of the main Gippsland line was switched off between Bunyip and Warragul stations in December 1998, and between Pakenham and Bunyip stations in 2005, as part of the Regional Fast Rail project.

== Description ==
The single rectifier unit substation - comprising a simple red brick building of utilitarian design on a concrete foundation and slab with cement-sheet roofing. includes the adjacent switchyard for the rectifier, circuit breaker, transformer and feeder equipment designed to the specification of the Chief Electrical Engineer of the Railway Electrical Branch of the Victorian Railways. The substation is divided by small walls housing the power generating rectifiers and transformers leading to an adjacent control room or annexe for the feeder panels and switch boards. As the Bunyip railway substation was unmanned, there was no requirement for office and staff facilities, though the annexe provided space for a desk, storage for the substation plans, and a small hand basin with running water.

== See also ==
- Architecture of Melbourne
- List of places on the Victorian Heritage Register in the Shire of Cardinia
