= Harewood, Koo Wee Rup =

Heritage-listed house in Melbourne, Victoria, Australia

Harewood
- The house in 2013

- Location of the house in Greater Metropolitan Melbourne
- Interactive map of the Harewood area
- Etymology: Hares

General information
- Status: Completed
- Type: Homestead
- Architectural style: Victorian
- Location: 3300 South Gippsland Highway, between Koo Wee Rup and Tooradin, Shire of Cardinia, Melbourne, Victoria, Australia
- Coordinates: 38°12′44″S 145°25′41″E
- Year built: 1865–1868
- Completed: 1868; 158 years ago
- Client: William Lyall
- Owner: Lyall family (1865–1968); Balas family (1968–1991); Macwhirter family (1991– )

Technical details
- Material: Stucco; bricks; corrugated iron; timber; glass
- Floor count: 2

Design and construction
- Architect: Alessandro Martelli
- Main contractor: George Binding

Website
- harewood-house.com

Site notes
- Public access: No; private home; Open day: Second Sunday in April annually

Victorian Heritage Register
- Official name: Harewood
- Type: Registered place
- Designated: 9 October 1974
- Reference no.: H0284
- Heritage overlay no.: HO116
- Category: Residential buildings (private)

Register of the National Estate
- Official name: Harewood Homestead
- Type: Defunct register
- Designated: 21 March 1978
- Reference no.: 5868

Harewood is a homestead located at 3300 South Gippsland Highway, midway between Koo Wee Rup and Tooradin, in the Shire of Cardinia, in the outer eastern suburbs of Melbourne, in Victoria, Australia.

Built from 1865 to 1868 on the traditional lands of the Bunurong people, the house was added to the Victorian Heritage Register on 9 October 1974 in recognition of its historical and architectural significance; and was also added to non-statutory lists by the Victorian branch of the National Trust on 4 June 1964 and the now defunct Register of the National Estate on 21 March 1978.

== History ==
Harewood was built between 1865 and 1868 on a sandy rise on the eastern shore of Western Port Bay for pastoralist and politician William Lyall to plans drawn up by the Melbourne architect of Italian origin, Alessandro Martelli. It replaced an earlier cottage on Lyall's run. Lyall was born in Scotland, migrated to Port Phillip by way of Van Diemen's Land in 1847, and took up several pastoral runs throughout the colony. He was also a partner in a leading Melbourne firm of stock agents.

He had made plans in 1858 to build a house here to use as a hunting lodge on his 30,000-hectare (74,000-acre) run, but there is no evidence that Harewood was used as anything other than a family home. During the late nineteenth and early twentieth centuries Harewood was the centre of social life in the Westernport Bay district, and notable guests included Lord Hopetoun, the Governor of Victoria and later the first Australian Governor-General, and his wife, who were guests.

Lyall was a prominent member of the Acclimatisation Society, and introduced here Australia's first hares (which gave the name to the property), as well as partridges, deer, pheasants, shaggy highland cattle and various plant species. His interests were wide-ranging: he also imported pedigree English cattle, sheep and horses for breeding; he attempted oyster culture in Western Port in 1873; he imported a brick-making machine in 1876 to supply the district with bricks; and he lost money in unsuccessful attempts to drain the Koo-Wee-Rup Swamps, including giving the Lang Lang River its first outlet to Westernort Bay. Lyall and his family were closely connected with the final years of the local Bunurong tribe, and Jimmy and Eliza, the last full-blood members of the tribe, lived in the room at the end of the stables during their later years. Lyall's descendants lived in the house until the 1960s.

== Description ==
The homestead in 1893

Harewood is a large picturesque stuccoed brick house. The front part consists of two separate single storey hipped roofed sections with a separately roofed hall between. The hall originally had a hipped roof and a small porch; by 1890 it had a gable with decorative bargeboards and a larger gabled porch also with a bargeboards. The hall is a feature of the design and was originally covered with glass, which was partly replaced by timber in the 1880s; the hall was originally decorated with large pot plants. The rear of the house consists of a two storeyed L-shaped section, with a small porch over the back door and a two-storey timber verandah on the side facing the bay. The roof is of corrugated iron. Several pieces of the original furniture, much of it made to order for Lyall in England, remain in the house. Most of the original outbuildings have been demolished, but the weatherboard stables have survived. The stable building is likely to incorporate the original hut on the site, built by Edwin Cockayne in c. 1850.

== See also ==
- Architecture of Melbourne
- List of places on the Victorian Heritage Register in the Shire of Cardinia
