= Mount Burnett Observatory =

Coordinates: 37.9727°S 145.4954°E

Mount Burnett Observatory is an astronomical observatory in Mount Burnett, Victoria, Australia.

It was built in 1972 to be the main astronomical observatory for Monash University. The original telescope was a 16-inch Newtonian reflector built by Mr L. Jeffree of Bendigo. Observers' quarters were built in 1975 with the aid of a grant from the William Buckland Foundation. A 10-inch Newtonian reflector was added, in a separate structure, in the early 1980s, and in 1985 the 16-inch telescope was replaced with a 0.45-metre Newtonian/Cassegrain telescope.

In the late 2000s the observatory was decommissioned, as it had fallen into disuse and the quality of the site had been degraded by encroaching light pollution over the years. In 2011 the organization Mt Burnett Observatory Inc. (MBO) was formed to take over the lease on the observatory and reopen it as a public facility. Founding members were Perry Vlahos, James Murray, Barry Cleland, Ray Schmidt and Ken Beard. In 2012 both telescopes were restored and additional telescopes acquired for use in an "astronomy classroom".

MBO (in partnership with the ARC Centre for Excellence in All Sky Astrophysics) won a National Science Week grant in 2014 to bring an astronomical roadshow to four venues in the Yarra Ranges. In 2015, MBO and Telescopes in Schools received a second National Science Week grant for an Astronomy and Light Festival (held at Scienceworks during Science Week).

As of January 2022 MBO had over 500 members and active programs for the public and members. A second dome, installed in May 2017, houses an automated 14-inch cassegrain telescope. The roof of the observer's quarters now houses several radio telescopes.

== See also ==
- List of astronomical societies
