= William Lyall (politician) =

Australian politician

- Born: June 1821; Foveran, Aberdeenshire, Scotland
- Died: 20 January 1888 (aged 66); Harewood, Koo Wee Rup, Victoria, Australia
- Occupations: Colonial Australian politician and pastoralist

William Lyall (June 1821 – 20 January 1888) was a Melbourne businessman and, later, pastoralist, who established a model farm in Murrumbeena, Victoria, to experiment with novel agricultural and animal husbandry methods. He lived with his family for many years on a working station at Tooradin in the Westernport Bay district. He pursued practical and adventurous farming practices, and also held a number of public offices.

== Biography ==
Lyall was born in Foveran, a village in Aberdeenshire, Scotland. The family emigrated to Van Diemen's Land (later named Tasmania) when he was in his teens. He moved to Melbourne in 1847 and started a business, later joining with two others to form the successful livestock importing and shipping firm, Mickle, Bakewell & Lyall.

Lyall married Annabella Brown (born in Glasgow in 1827) on 29 January 1849 in Launceston, Tasmania; they lived at Tooradin station, south east of Cranbourne, from 1852 until, in 1854 he took his family to Britain, where he studied agricultural chemistry. He returned to Australia in 1856 with stud Hereford cattle, Cotswold sheep, hares, pheasants and partridges, with which he continued his livestock acclimatisation work. He and his family returned to live at Tooradin in 1859, remaining into the 1870s. Lyall was active in agricultural improvement societies and exhibited in local agricultural shows, often garnering awards. He gained a reputation as a stockbreeder.

Lyall established a model (experimental) farm at Frogmore Estate in Carnegie, near Murrumbeena, on 93 acres (38 ha), later expanding to 212 acres (86 ha). Here he bred cattle and horses and experimented with different grasses and types of pasture. Around 1857, the architect Joseph Reed, who designed the Melbourne Town Hall and State Library of Victoria, among other significant buildings, built Lyall a house on the Frogmore property. Lyall also took over Yallock, a former property of Mickle, Bakewell & Lyall, near Koo Wee Rup, where he had his permanent home, Harewood, built.

Lyall was a member and president of the Cranbourne Shire Council in the 1880s; was an elected member of the Victorian Legislative Assembly for the Mornington electorate, 1859–1861. He was the first president of the Mornington Pastoral and Agricultural Society, was a founder of the Victorian Agricultural Society, the Zoological Society, the Acclimatisation Society and the Victoria Racing Club, was a member of the National Agricultural Society, and a territorial magistrate.

Lyall died at "Harewood" on 20 January 1888 and was buried in Cranbourne cemetery. A street in Cranbourne retains his name.

Victorian Legislative Assembly
New district	Member for Mornington; October 1859 – July 1861	Succeeded by Henry Samuel Chapman
