= Bayles, Victoria =

Coordinates: 38°10′55″S 145°34′30″E

Bayles
- Town
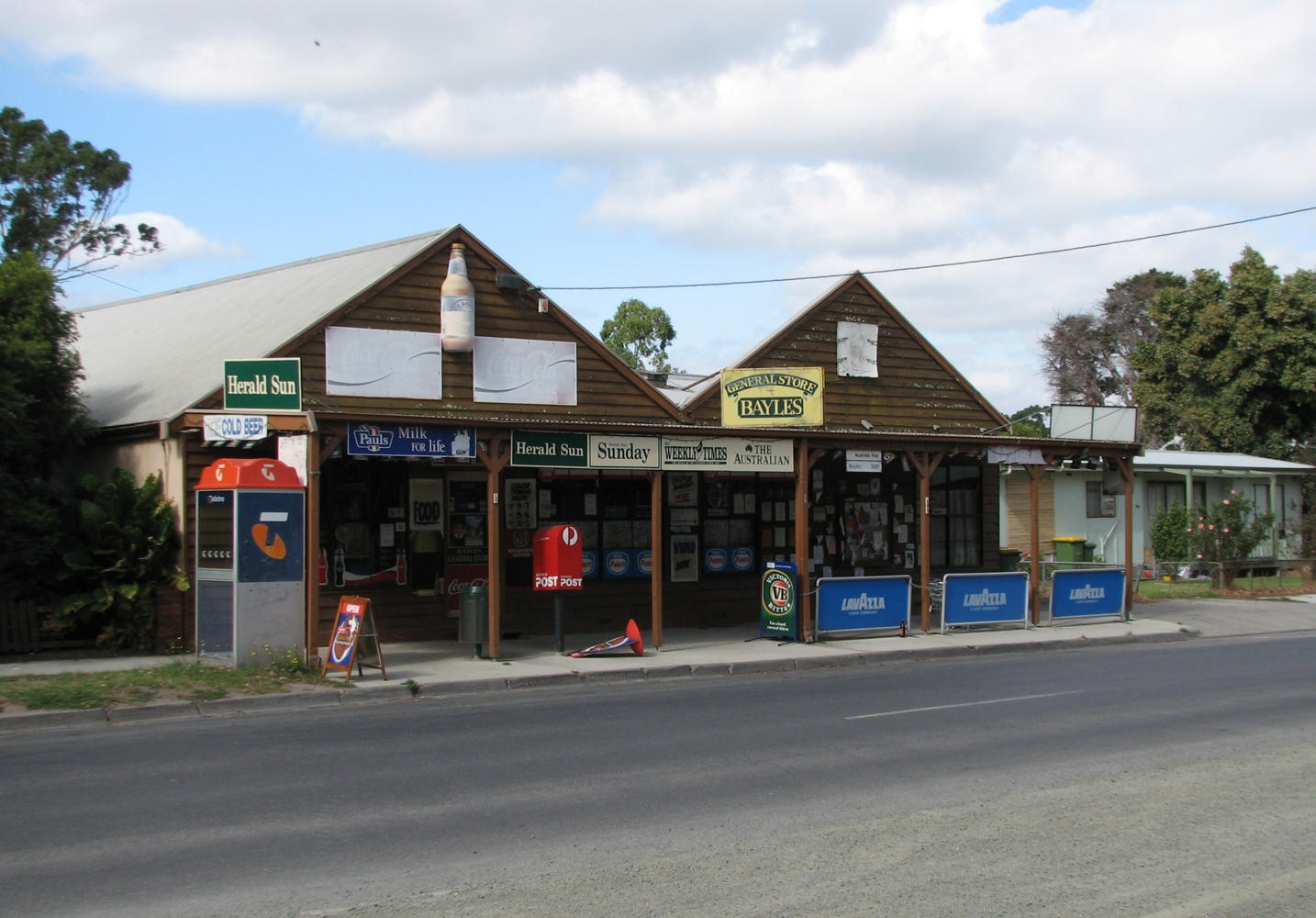
- Bayles General Store and Post Office
- Interactive map of Bayles
- Country: Australia
- State: Victoria
- LGA: Shire of Cardinia

Government
  - State electorate: Bass
  - Federal division: Monash

Population
  - Total: 445 (2021 census)
- Postcode: 3981

Bayles is a locality in Victoria, Australia, 75 kilometers (48 miles) south-east of Melbourne's Central Business District, located within the Shire of Cardinia local government area. Bayles recorded a population of 445 at the 2021 census.

Bayles is located to the east of the town of Koo Wee Rup, on the Koo Wee Rup-Longwarry Road.

== History ==
Bayles Post Office opened on 5 September 1921.

In 1991, the short film Plead guilty, get a bond was filmed in town, using the town's hall as the courthouse.

=== Heritage listing ===
The following place in Bayles is listed on the Victorian Heritage Register:

- Bayles Bridges, two road bridges that carries the Koo Wee Rup–Longwarry Road over the Yallock Creek

== See also ==
- City of Cranbourne – Bayles was previously within this former local government area.
