= USS Cockatoo =

Two ships of the United States Navy have been named Cockatoo, after the cockatoo family of parrots:

- USS Cockatoo (AMc-8)
- USS Cockatoo (AMCU-21)
