= Kurth Kiln =

Heritage-listed charcoal kiln in Yarra Ranges, Victoria, Australia

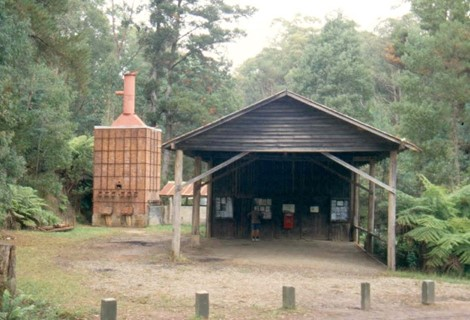
- The kiln and shed, c. 2002

- Location of the kiln in Victoria
- Interactive map of the Kurth Kiln area

General information
- Status: Completed
- Type: Charcoal kiln; Storage shed
- Location: Soldiers Road, Gembrook, Kurth Kiln Regional Park, Yarra Ranges, Melbourne, Victoria, Australia
- Coordinates: 37°53′57″S 145°34′32″E
- Year built: 1941–1942
- Completed: 18 March 1942; 84 years ago
- Closed: c. 1943
- Cost: A£1,799 17s 2d
- Client: Forests Commission Victoria

Height
- Height: 9 m (30 ft)

Technical details
- Material: Metal; red bricks; concrete; iron
- Size: Kiln: 3.1 m × 4 m (10 ft × 13 ft); Shed: 25 m × 7.7 m (82 ft × 25 ft)

Design and construction
- Architect: S. J. B. Hart
- Architecture firm: Forests Commission Victoria
- Engineer: Dr Ernest Kurth (University of Tasmania)
- Main contractor: Stanley and Nance

Website
- friendsofkurthkiln.org.au

Site notes
- Management: Parks Victoria
- Public access: Yes

Victorian Heritage Register
- Official name: Kurth Kiln
- Type: Registered place; Registered archaeological place
- Designated: 20 March 2003
- Reference no.: H2012
- Heritage overlay nos.: HO21; HO400
- Category: Forestry and Timber Industry

Register of the National Estate
- Official name: Charcoal Kiln, Gembrook
- Type: Defunct register
- Designated: undated
- Reference no.: 102680

The Kurth Kiln is a charcoal kiln and associated storage shed, located on Soldiers Road, approximately seven kilometres (four miles) north of Gembrook, on the Tomahawk Creek, within the Kurth Kiln Regional Park, in the Yarra Ranges, in the north eastern suburbs of Melbourne, in Victoria, Australia.

Built between 1941 and 1942 by the Forests Commission Victoria on the traditional lands of the Wurundjeri people, the kiln was added to the Victorian Heritage Register on 20 March 2003 in recognition of its historical and scientific significance; and was also added to the non-statutory and now defunct Register of the National Estate on an unknown date.

The site is managed by Parks Victoria as part of the Kurth Kiln Regional Park; and is open to the public.

== History ==
The Kurth Kiln was constructed by the Forests Commission of Victoria between 1941 1942 to produce charcoal for use as a substitute fuel source. Petrol shortages during World War II created a demand for charcoal suitable for gas producer units fitted to cars and trucks. The Kurth Kiln was the only commercially-sized continuously operational charcoal kiln in Victoria. The kiln was in full production by mid-1942, but transport difficulties, structural problems, and oversupply of charcoal by private operators meant the kiln was used only intermittently during 1943, and was shut down soon after. The kiln is one of only two known portable metal charcoal kilns in Victoria.

Dr Ernest Edgar Kurth from the University of Tasmania was commissioned to design the kiln. Gembrook was selected as the ideal site for the kiln because it fully met three essential criteria required for successful operation that included:

1. water — the kiln required 9,092 litres (2,000 imp gal) of water per day in order for its cooling systems to be effective;
2. wood — the kiln burnt approximately 101 cubic metres (28 cord) of wood per week; and
3. gradient — sloping land enabled easier-top loading of wood into the kiln.

Dr Kurth was paid A£5 for the use of his patented design (Note: Patent No. 2563/41.) and the total cost of establishing the kiln was A£1,799, seventeen shillings and tuppence. The kiln commenced operation in March 1942 but transport difficulties combined with an oversupply of charcoal from private operators meant the kiln was used only intermittently during 1943 and was shut down soon after. Over the period of its operation, Kurth Kiln produced only 427 tonnes (471 short tons) of charcoal, which represented a tiny fraction of Victoria’s total production.

=== Petrol rationing ===
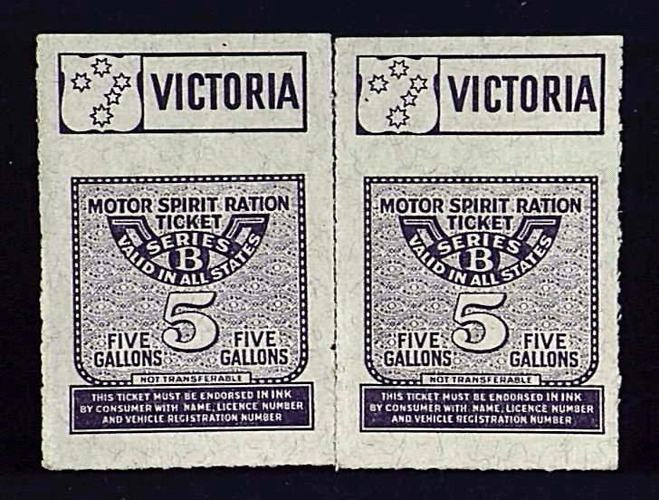
Petrol ration tickets five-gallon, 1940-1945 (source: Museums Victoria

Australia’s declaration of war on 2 September 1939 immediately raised concerns about the security of petrol supplies. At the time Australia was totally reliant on imported fuel and had a limited storage capacity. At the start of the war, the country had sufficient petrol for only three months supply and by May 1940 the Commonwealth Oil Board estimated that only 67 per cent of the total capacity of approximately 640 million litres (140×10^{6} imp gal) was on-hand.

The Australian Government considered increasing the price of fuel to dampen demand. Another plan was that petrol should be merchandised in two colours, blue for commercial vehicles, and red for private cars, with red petrol being substantially more expensive than blue. The motoring industry and newspapers resisted the changes. When France collapsed, the Minister for Supply stressed to Cabinet that continuity of the already erratic deliveries was under threat, and on 6 June 1940 Cabinet made the decision that rationing should be introduced to reduce consumption by fifty per cent. Political expediency came into play and petrol rationing was introduced in September 1940 and restrictions were tightened as the war progressed.

On 17 June 1941 the Prime Minister, Robert Menzies announced further restrictions to motorists limiting them to nine litres (two imperial gallons) per month which were enough for 1,609 kilometres (1,000 mi) per year so many simply put their cars up on blocks for the duration and switched to public transport or walked. The scheme devised for petrol rationing coupons was complicated, and the paperwork was profuse. Drivers had to apply for a petrol licence from which they were allocated ration tickets based on an assessment of their needs.

The firefighting vehicles operated by the Forests Commission were exempt from the petrol restrictions. District foresters were authorised to issue petrol coupons for timber industry trucks, which, in the absence of private cars and utes, often served as family transport too. Country school buses were fitted with gas converters and on declared days of Acute Fire Danger they were banned. Some of Melbourne's buses also ran on charcoal. Petrol rationing was not strictly enforced until 1942 but remained in place until February 1950.

=== Charcoal as a replacement fuel ===
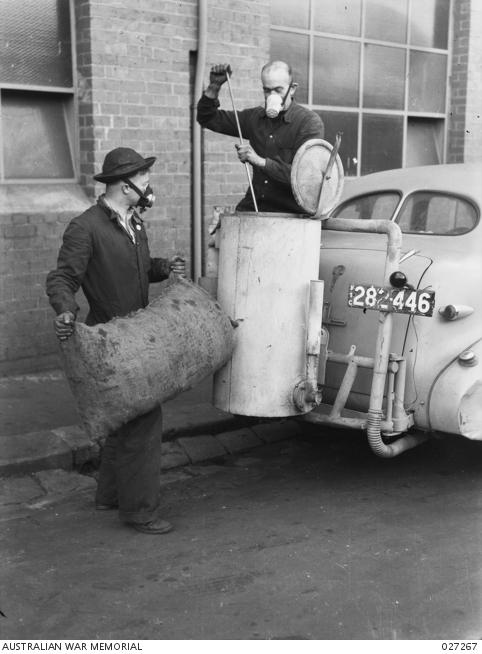
Producer gas in Melbourne, 1942 (source: Australian War Memorial)

During the first half of the twentieth century charcoal production in Victoria was small and employed relatively few people. The charcoal was supplied to blacksmiths, coal depots, gas works and some powerhouses. The main areas in Victorian state forests that produced charcoal were in a broad arc across Central Victoria, including Beaufort, Broadford, the Dandenongs, Gembrook, Lionville, Macedon, and Trentham. Charcoal was also produced in East Gippsland, mainly at Nowa Nowa. The best trees were durable species like red ironbark (Eucalyptus sideroxylon), red box (E. polyanthemos), grey box (E. microcarpa), yellow box (E. mellidora), red gum (E. camadulensis) and for lighter grades of charcoal, yellow stringybark (E. meullerana).

The charcoal was produced by slow and controlled burning of wood in earthen, brick or metal kilns. The simplest method was the beehive kiln where wood was stacked vertically into a conical heap to allow air and smoke movement and then covered with a layer of sticks and twigs. The stack was then covered further with a thick layer of earth and ash. Once the stack was alight the small chimney opening at the top was sealed. It then required constant tending to ensure no air entered the stack and took approximately three days to reduce the wood to charcoal. Large beehive kilns each contained approximately 181 cubic metres (50 cord) of wood and were very labour intensive. They also produced charcoal of uneven consistency with a high ash content and some inevitable soil contamination. Other charcoal producers opted for lined pits in the ground, steel chambers, or recycled boilers.

With the urging of the Australian Government, charcoal quickly emerged as a substitute fuel in response to the national petrol rationing. A special vehicle-mounted unit which converted charcoal into flammable gases (principally carbon monoxide and hydrogen) was known to be suitable to power internal combustion engines.

Charcoal was relatively simple to produce but had a well-deserved reputation for being inconvenient to use for short trips, inefficient, under powered, dirty, belching black smoke, catching fire and occasionally exploding. Also, the cost of installation of a heavy and cumbersome producer gas kit was approximately A£100, or the equivalent of 16 times the average weekly wage, and a bag of charcoal lasted between 48 to 97 kilometres (30 to 60 mi) at a cost between 6 and 10 shillings. Charcoal had a cost advantage over petrol and tests earlier in 1938–1939 indicated savings in the order 80 per cent for truck operations for producer gas compared to the cost of petrol. At the time, a new car, if you could get one, cost approximately A£250 for a small Austin, and A£525 for a large Buick.

Over the war-years, some 56,000 gas producer units of varying design were fitted to private and commercial vehicles in Australia. This low conversion rate to producer gas technology represented less than 6.5 per cent of all vehicles on the road by 1944.

The overall consumption of charcoal in Victoria rose thirtyfold from approximately 100 tonnes (110 short tons) per month before the war to over 3,000 tonnes (3,300 short tons) by mid-1942. This massive increase required nearly 250,000 tonnes (280,000 short tons)s of dry wood annually to feed the hundreds of kilns set up across State forests, as well as on private land, at a time when labour was critically short.

=== Forests Commission Victoria ===
The task of ensuring adequate supplies of charcoal fell to the Forests Commission Victoria. It subsequently formed the State Charcoal Branch to organise the increased production of charcoal, to build up reserves to meet emergencies and to regulate the cost to consumers. The assistance of an expert Advisory Panel, representing charcoal producers, manufacturers and distributors of vehicle gas equipment, the Department of Supply and Development, and the Victorian Automobile Chamber of Commerce, was enlisted under the Chairman of the Forests Commission, Alfred Vernon Galbraith. Preliminary arrangements were made for bag supplies, for railway sidings in Melbourne, and for processing of charcoal bought by the Branch in excess of the requirements of private grading firms. In its first year, 15,804 tonnes (17,421 short tons) of charcoal were produced compared with 1,500 tonnes (1,650 short tons) before the war. Production peaked at 35,309 tonnes (38,922 short tons) in 1942-1943.

The Commission had the added responsibility of providing emergency firewood to Melbourne for heating and cooking purposes as a result of reductions in the supply of coal, electricity and gas. The Emergency Firewood Project continued long after the war ended and over the period from 1941 to 1954, nearly one point eight million tonnes (two million short tons) of firewood was produced.

An estimated 221 kilns and twelve pits were producing charcoal by the middle of 1942. Some of the labour was provided by Italian wartime internees. There were also over 600 commercial kilns operating mostly on private property. At least 50 to 60 private charcoal retorts were set up in the Barmah forest alone. The majority of the kilns were metal retorts because charcoal from earthen beehive kilns or unlined pits proved unsuitable for motor vehicles, causing gumming of engine valves and the controls in the gas lines due to the condensation of tar.

Galbraith became aware of experiments by Dr Kurth, who had been experimenting with the pyrolysis of wood and kiln designs since 1940. Kurth's work led to a quarter-size prototype kiln at Dover, Tasmania in March 1941. A second operational kiln was built at a sawmill near Launceston in January 1942. In July 1941, Professor Kurth provided details of his kiln design and nine pages of handwritten notes on its operation to Galbraith which marked the beginning of the project at Gembrook.

The kiln was unusual in that it could operate continually with the top loading of wood billets and bottom recovery of charcoal. A water-cooled grate at the bottom of the stack caused the brittle charred wood to crumble under its own weight into manageable pieces, while at the same time maintaining the charring temperature at the critical point to produce a consistent quality charcoal. Not only was this process said to be 50 per cent faster than any other method then in use, but it was also 10-15 per cent more efficient. So cooled charcoal was raked out the bottom as more wood was added into the top.

Tests in Tasmania indicated that the prototype could produce approximately 1 tonne (1.4 short tons) of charcoal per day which compared favourably with a single ton every three days from a standard steel kiln. six tonnes (seven short tons) of wood produced one tonne (one short ton) of charcoal with an output of 18 tonnes (20 short tons) per week if the kiln was operated continuously with three shifts per day. The cost of building the kiln was estimated to be approximately half that required for five or six portable steel kilns needed to produce the same quantity. Good quality charcoal sold for four shillings and sixpence for a 23-kilogram (50 lb) bag. The claimed advantages could not be ignored by an organisation under pressure to secure Victoria's war-time charcoal supplies, so Galbraith enclosed £5 to Professor Kurth in a letter on 16 July 1941 for the use of his patented design.

== Description ==
The design of the kiln was based on the work of Professor Ernest Kurth, Professor of Chemistry at the University of Tasmania. Professor Kurth had been investigating the pyrolysis of timber and kiln design since early 1940. His work resulted in the construction of a prototype continuously burning kiln in Tasmania in 1941. The Gembrook kiln was based on Kurth’s design, and was the only one of its kind ever built in Victoria. The kiln’s design facilitated continuous loading of timber at the top and recovery of charcoal at the bottom. An intricate water-cooling system separated the production and discharge chambers, and cooled the charcoal before removal.

The Kurth Kiln is constructed of red brick, on a concrete foundation. The kiln is approximately 9 metres (30 ft) high by 3.1 by 4 metres (10 by 13 ft). The brickwork is reinforced with steel strapping. It has iron doors over the openings, and an iron smoke stack. Alongside the kiln is a timber storage shed, erected in 1942. It has a corrugated galvanised iron roof supported by ‘tree trunk’ columns set into concrete foundations. The shed is approximately 25 metres (82 ft) long by 7.7 metres (25 ft) wide.

The south end of the shed has an attached skillion, divided by internal walls. Between the skillion and the kiln is a small gable-roofed structure on round posts with low concrete walls.

The Gembrook charcoal kiln is located on the north side of the Gembrook Tonimbuk Road, approximately 50m west of the Two Scouts Road entry. It is set in bushland, and appears to have been either set in a shallow hole or has earth piled up around it deliberately or washed down the slope to the immediate north. Retired forester, H. Skane, reported that earth ramps were often built up around the kilns to facilitate loading or perhaps in the case of this type of kiln, the operation of vents on its roof.

The kiln is an oven-like fabricated sheet metal enclosure, made of cast iron and in a rectangular shape. It has a pitched roof and the remnants of an iron floor. The roof has four rectangular flanged openings, two large and two small. The kiln had a door at one end, which has been removed, and the doorway has pivot hinges to one side and a form of latch keeper to the other. The construction method appears to have included both welding and riveting of joints.

The eastern, western and northern sides of the kiln have rusted out along rivet lines, being worst on the eastern side. As a whole, the structure is reasonably solid and is still easily recognisable as a charcoal kiln illustrating directly the technical process or charcoal burning. Sheets of metal seem to have been removed from one side, and the mounting of the kiln is presumed to have been changed.

=== Gembrook site ===
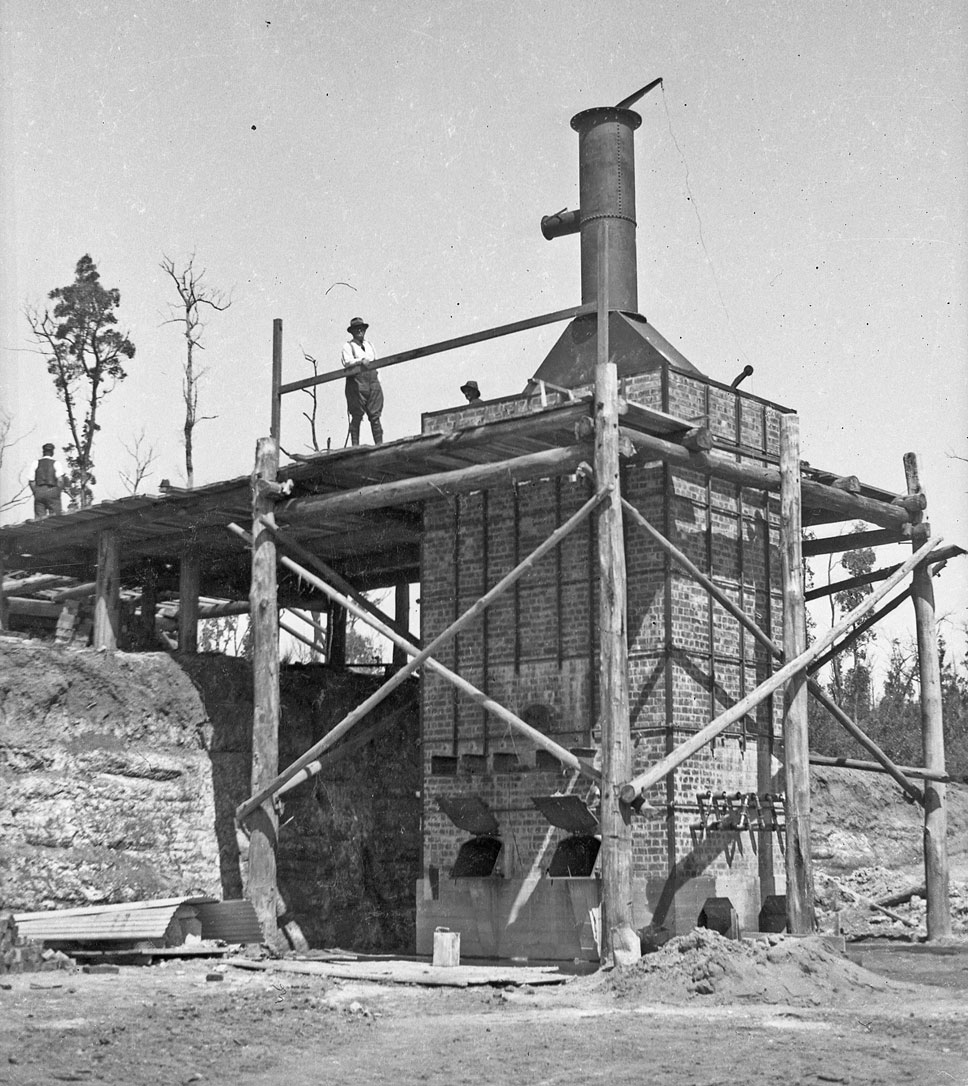
Kurth Kiln under construction. Note the inclined ramp for top loading of wood billets and chute at the bottom to recover cooled charcoal; c.late 1941 (source: FCRPA collection)

The selection of the suitable site on State forest for Professor Kurth's kiln depended on adequate supplies of water, wood, and gradient. Firstly, the kiln needed approximately 2,000 imperial gallons (9,092 L) per day for its cooling system, secondly, it needed approximately 101 cubic metres (28 cord) of wood per week as feedstock, and thirdly a slope of approximately 5.5 metres (18 ft) was required to facilitate top loading. The site chosen at Tomahawk Creek met all these requirements.

Water was supplied by an old mining race from the Tomahawk Creek which also powered a water wheel operating a vibrating screen to grade the charcoal before bagging.

Much of the Gembrook landscape had been cleared for agriculture, supported a thriving timber industry and also mined for gold and gemstones since 1859 so most of the older mature forest had been disturbed in some way. More importantly, a large area of older and damaged messmate trees (Eucalyptus obliqua) in the nearby State forest had been deliberately ringbarked as a silvicultural treatment to encourage new regeneration growth by Forests Commission unemployment relief workers some ten years earlier during the 1930s depression. Approximately 145 workers had felled over approximately 1,619 hectares (4,000 acres) during 1930-1931. This left a large amount of standing dry wood suitable for the kilns operation within a one-thousand-six-hundred-and-nine-metre (one-mile) radius.

Access to roads and the railway station at Gembrook for transport was an important consideration. There was also a critical shortage of labour to operate the kiln during the war years which was exacerbated by a major timber salvage program underway in the Central Highlands after the 1939 Black Friday bushfires. Although the site at Gembrook had not been severely burnt in either 1926 or 1939.

Earth works commenced in late August 1941. A construction contract for the kiln was awarded to builders Stanley and Nance of Middle Park on 17 October and the detailed design work was done by the Forests Commission’s own architect, S. J. B. Hart. Building commenced in November and by 18 December 1941 was nearly completed. The architect reported on 11 February 1942 to the Secretary of the Forests Commission that the kiln was ready for operations after a small trial run. The project cost £1799 17s 2d which included the establishment of the site, construction of the kiln, erection of buildings, purchase of equipment, the connection of telephone and supply of water. It was a sizable investment.

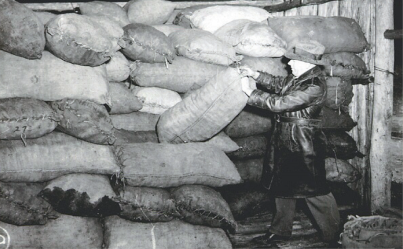
Commissioner Finton George Gerraty with approximately 64 t (70 short tons) of bagged charcoal in the storage shed at Kurth Kiln in July 1942. Production was suspended to clear the backlog (source: Friends of Kurth Kiln)

The kiln was a rectangular structure 4 by 3.5 by 8 metres (13 by 11 by 26 ft) high on a concrete foundation and the red brick walls were reinforced with iron strapping. The kiln held 23 tonnes (25 short tons) of one-metre-long (three-foot) billets per load which were carried up on a small inclined tramway to be loaded into the top.

The initial firing was on 18 March 1942 and after some initial teething problems with the steel doors the kiln was in full production by mid-1942. Combustion took two days to complete and the kiln produced 220 tonnes (243 short tons) of charcoal for its first financial year 1941-1942; reduced to 26 tonnes (29 short tons) in the latter half of the year.

Production by July 1942 was so successful that problems of storage soon became apparent. Commissioner Finton George Gerraty reported that approximately 64 tonnes (70 short tons) of graded charcoal was stockpiled and the storage sheds were taxed to the limit. Production was suspended to solve this short-term problem. However, at the same time the kiln suffered further structural problems. An inspection in September 1942 indicated that major repairs were required to some loosening brickwork near the inspection doors and this together with the emerging oversupply of charcoal raised serious questions about the kiln's future. Continuing transport and distribution difficulties from Gembrook combined with an oversupply of charcoal from private operators meant the kiln was used only intermittently during 1943 and was shut down soon after. Petrol rationing also eased at the end of the war, although continued until 1950, reducing the demand for charcoal.

Over the total period of its operation, Kurth Kiln produced 427 tonnes (471 short tons) of charcoal which represented only a tiny fraction of Victoria’s total production. The kiln was a victim of circumstance and not the "white elephant" that these low production figures might suggest.

=== Forest workers camp ===
After the cessation of war hostilities, the Kallista District of the Forests Commission advised in February 1946, that they could absorb forty returned servicemen for silvicultural, afforestation, fire protection, and utilisation works. This was part of a five-year statewide plan drawn up and approved by the Allied Works Council with funding allocated for the first two-year period totalling £3,842,175. Similar camps were established in other Victorian state forests to house and employ migrants and refugees from war-torn Europe.

To provide accommodation, eighteen masonite huts were purchased from the Australian Army and erected at the site. By July 1946 the Commission decided to make Kurth Kiln its main base camp for the region to house 80 to 100 workers. The forest camp operated continuously until 8 January 1963 when three huts were burnt by bushfires. The remaining buildings began to slowly deteriorate and construction of an all-weather road network meant workers could be housed at nearby townships instead. The site declined through to the 1970s. Three huts were demolished and the material used to modify a remaining one as a caretaker’s residence in c. 1984 for Ron Thornton, who lived on-site for another 16 years. The sheds were then mainly used as storage of eucalyptus seed needed for regeneration works and for Forests Commission equipment such and pumps and hoses. The small dam next to the kiln was regularly used to as a pump school to prepare staff for the summer fire season.

The kiln was transformed into a picnic ground in c. 1978, led by Frank May, a district forester, with works supervised by two local overseers, Tom Steege and Bob Ferris. Remnants of an historic steel charcoal kiln can also still be found at nearby Tonimbuk and another at Kinglake West.

Parks Victoria is responsible for the Kurth Kiln Regional Park and completed conservation works on several of the most urgent building repairs. A small and active volunteer group formed in June 1999 to help protect and interpret the site.

== Gallery ==
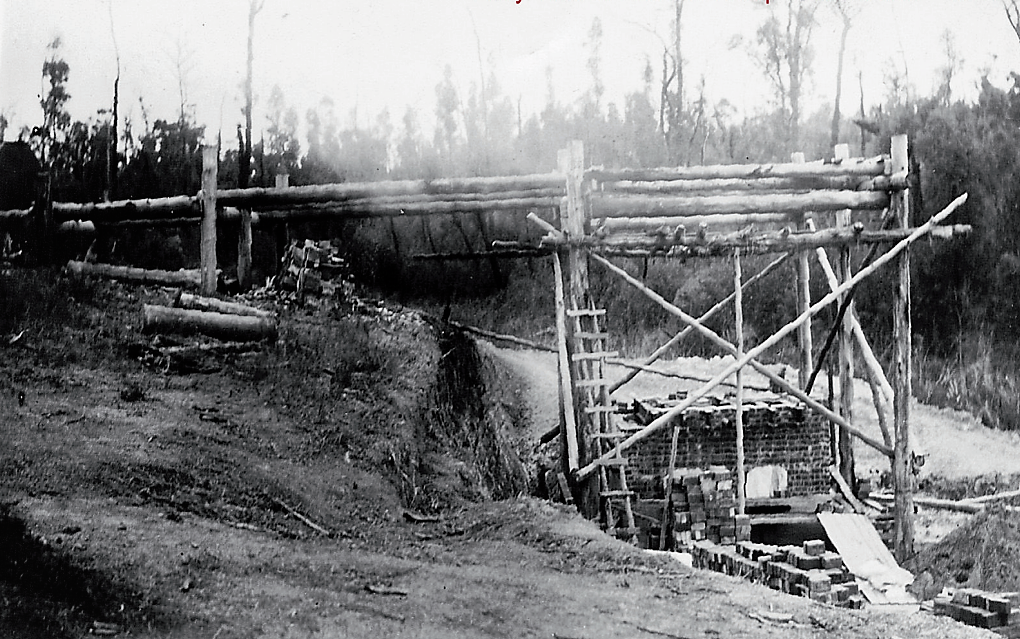
Early stages of construction, November 1941 (source: Friends of Kurth Kiln)

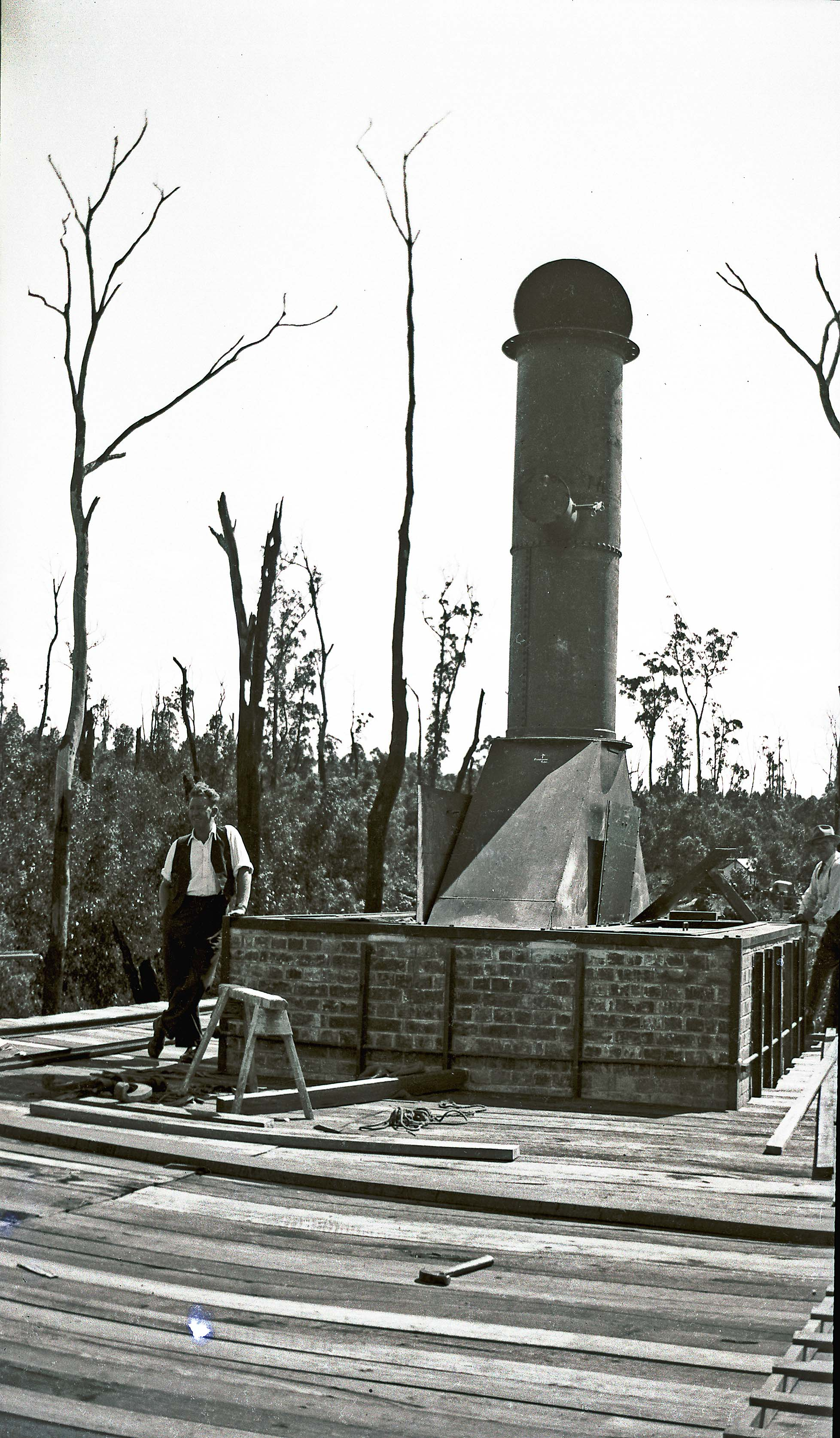
Kurth Kiln upper deck during construction, c. late 1941 (source: FCRPA collection)

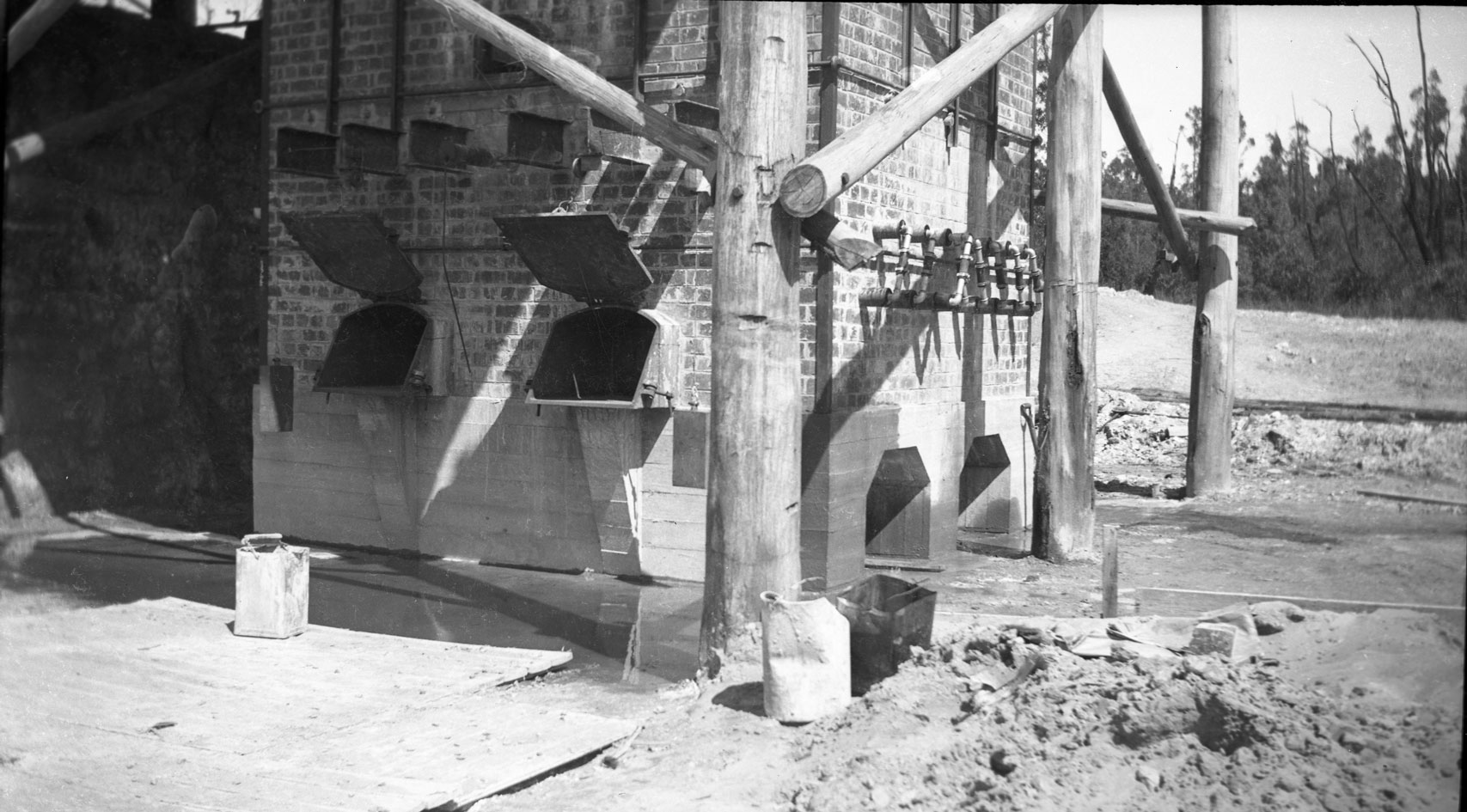
Kurth Kiln during construction, c. late 1941 (source: FCRPA collection)

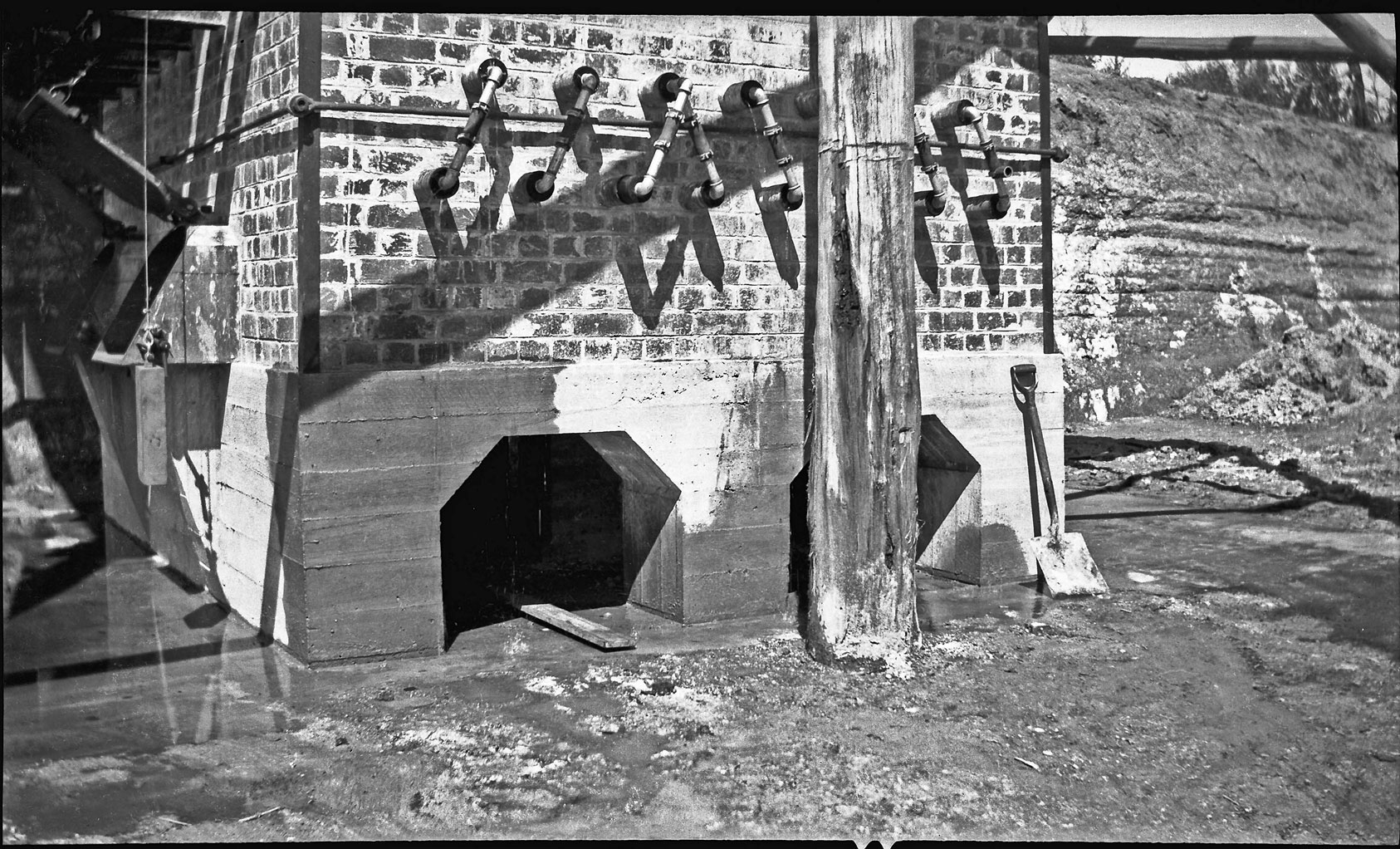
Kurth Kiln during construction showing charcoal extraction chutes and water cooling pipes, c. late 1941 (source: FCRPA collection)

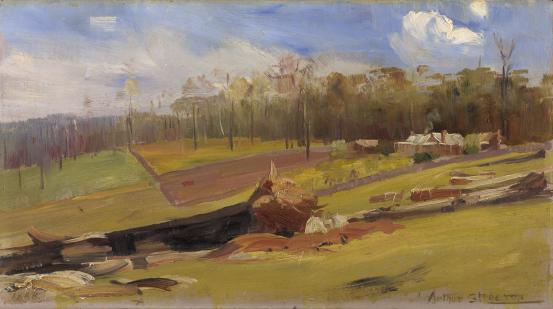
Arthur Streeton painting of the residence of J. Walker, Esq., Gembrook, 1889; showing clearing of land and forest for agriculture

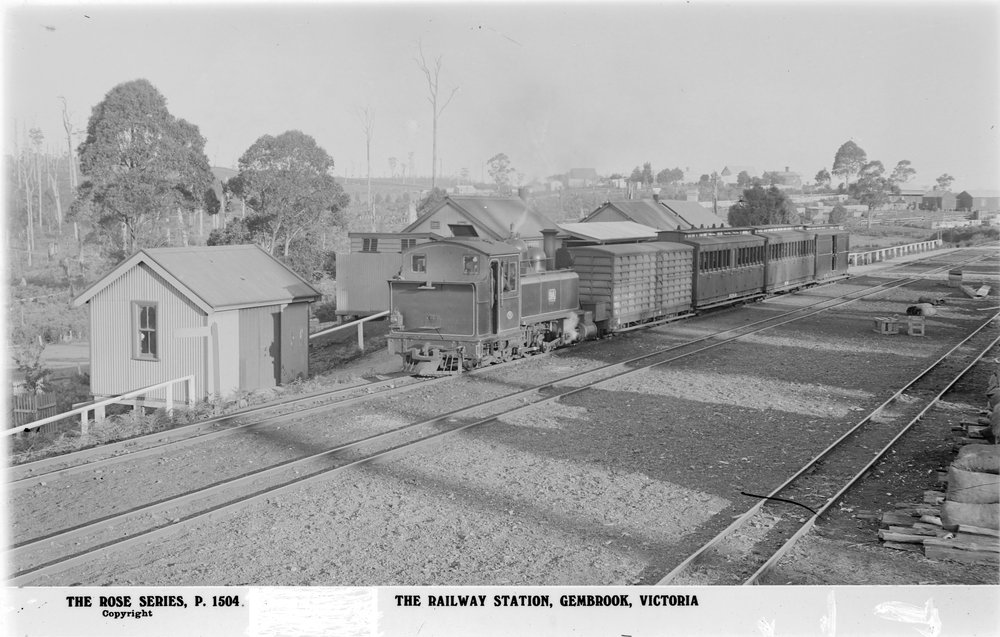
Gembrook railway station with possible charcoal bags sitting on the right awaiting transfer. This line is part of the Puffing Billy Tourist railway

== See also ==
- Architecture of Melbourne
- Forestry in Australia
- List of places on the Victorian Heritage Register in the Shire of Yarra Ranges
