= Cockatoo Island (disambiguation) =

Cockatoo Island is a UNESCO World Heritage Site in Sydney Harbour, New South Wales, Australia.

Cockatoo Island may also refer to:

- Cockatoo Island Dockyard, an important naval and commercial dockyard in Sydney Harbour
- Cockatoo Island (Queensland) in the Brisbane River
- Cockatoo Island (Western Australia), an island in the Buccaneer Archipelago off the coast of Western Australia
