= Monomeith =

Coordinates: 38°12′22″S 145°33′14″E

- Town
- Country: Australia
- State: Victoria
- LGA: Shire of Cardinia
- Location: 67 km (42 mi) from Melbourne

Government
  - State electorate: Bass
  - Federal division: Monash

Population
  - Total: 69 (2021 census)
- Postcode: 3984

Monomeith is a locality in Victoria, Australia, 67 kilometres (42 mi) south-east of Melbourne's central business district, located within the Shire of Cardinia local government area. Monomeith recorded a population of 69 at the 2021 census.

In 1942, during World War II, a military airfield was constructed for the air defence of Melbourne, south of Spencers Road, and is still visible using Google Earth.

== History ==
The word Monomeeth is a Boonwurrung word meaning "good."

The Monomeith Post Office opened on 20 July 1900 and closed in 1969; and a railway station existed from 1890 until the late 1970s.

As of 2015, the site of the former airfield was considered as a site for Melbourne's third major airport for passenger jet aircraft.

=== Heritage listing ===
The following place in Monomeith is listed on the Victorian Heritage Register:

- Monomeith homestead, 405 Monomeith Road

== See also ==
- City of Cranbourne – Monomeith was previously within this former local government area.
