= Mount Burnett, Victoria =

Mount Burnett
- Town
- Coordinates: 37.983°S 145.500°E
- Country: Australia
- State: Victoria
- LGA: Shire of Cardinia
- Location: 72 km (45 mi) E of Melbourne; 6 km (3.7 mi) S of Cockatoo

Government
  - State electorate: Monbulk
  - Federal division: La Trobe

Population
  - Total: 180 (2021 census)
- Postcode: 3781

Mount Burnett is a locality in the Shire of Cardinia, Victoria, Australia. It is located approximately 72 kilometres (45 mi) from Melbourne.At the 2021 census, Mount Burnett recorded had a population of 180.

== History ==
Gembrook West Post Office opened on 1 January 1885, was renamed Mount Burnett in 1921 and closed in 1978.

== See also ==
- Shire of Pakenham – Mount Burnett was previously within this former local government area.
- Mount Burnett Observatory
