= Cockatoo, Victoria =

Cockatoo
- Town
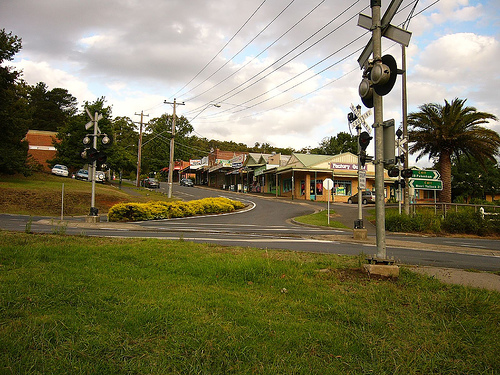
- McBride Street

- Interactive map of Cockatoo
- Coordinates: 37.935°S 145.492°E
- Country: Australia
- State: Victoria
- City: Melbourne
- LGA: Shire of Cardinia
- Location: 48 km (30 mi) from Melbourne; 17 km (11 mi) from Belgrave

Government
  - State electorate: Monbulk
  - Federal division: La Trobe
- Elevation: 158 m (518 ft)

Population
  - Total: 4,408 (2021 census)
- Postcode: 3781
- Mean max temp: 29.43 °C (84.97 °F)
- Mean min temp: 14.7 °C (58.5 °F)
- Annual rainfall: 658 mm (25.9 in)
Localities around Cockatoo
Avonsleigh	Macclesfield	Nangana
Emerald	Cockatoo	Gembrook
Dewhurst	Mount Burnett	Mount Burnett

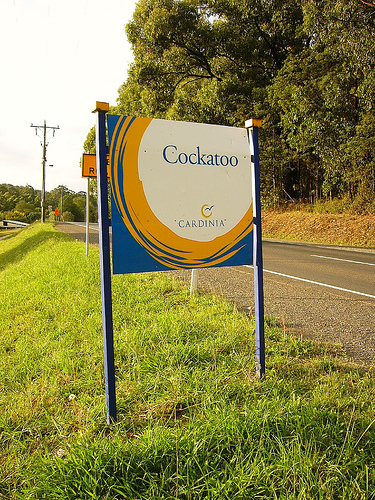
Sign along Pakenham Road

Cockatoo is a town in Victoria, Australia, 48 km south-east of Melbourne's central business district, located within the Shire of Cardinia local government area. Cockatoo recorded a population of 4,408 at the 2021 census.

Cockatoo is named after Cockatoo Creek, which runs through the town, and which the town was previously named.

== History ==
Cockatoo was named after Cockatoo Creek. It was first settled in the 1870s but progress was tardy as the land was difficult to clear.

A Post Office was not opened until 1 November 1901 when the railway arrived and was known as Cockatoo Creek until 1917.

Shortly after the end of the World War I, a large number of immigrants went to live in Cockatoo while working in Melbourne. The most significant wave was made by Italians. Timbergetting was the major source of employment and this industry received a considerable boost when the narrow-gauge railway from Upper Ferntree Gully to Gembrook was completed in 1900. Moreover, the railway brought leisure-seeking Melburnians into the area and a market for subdivision arose. The railway is operated today as the Puffing Billy Railway.

Cockatoo was one of the worst-hit townships during the disastrous 1983 Ash Wednesday Bushfires, where over 300 buildings were destroyed and six lives lost. During their March 1983 Australian tour, Charles, Prince of Wales and Diana, Princess of Wales visited Cockatoo, and planted a flowering gum (Corymbia ficifolia, formerly Eucalyptus ficifolia) at the entrance to the kindergarten to mark the occasion.

=== Heritage listing ===
The following place in Cockatoo is listed on the Victorian Heritage Register:

- Cockatoo kindergarten (former building), 2–10 McBride Street, repurposed since 2017 as the Ash Wednesday Bushfire Education Centre

== Present day ==
Cockatoo has a community shopping centre which includes supermarket, hairdressing salon, smokehouse, pharmacy, yoga studio, opportunity shop, cafés and various takeaway stores. Cockatoo has recently built a town centre garden square.

=== Services ===
A mobile library service is available at the Community Hall carpark on Thursday evenings. The town has a community garden site at Alma Treloar Reserve growing various fruit and vegetables. Cockatoo Primary School, near the town centre, recently celebrated its centenary.

Other services in the town include:

- Kindergartens
- Licensed Post Office
- Church
- Charity Store
- Country Fire Authority (CFA) Station
- RSL Club
- Child Care Centre
- Veterinary clinic
- Doctor

=== Community organisations ===
- Cockatoo Neighbourhood House
- Hills Community Gardens
- Men's shed
- Cockatoo Country Market
- 1st Cockatoo Scouts
- Connecting Cockatoo Communities (township committee)
- Ash Wednesday Bushfire Education Centre

=== Sporting ===
Cockatoo has two main sporting areas: Mountain Road reserve, which has a football oval, netball courts, indoor YMCA Stadium and Little Athletics Course; and Bailey Road tennis courts and Bowls Club. The Josie Bysouth reserve is a smaller ground mainly used for equestrian events and pony club. The main sport of the town is Australian rules football with the Gembrook-Cockatoo Football Club or "Brookers" representing the town in both the local senior and junior leagues in the Yarra Valley Mountain District Football League.

The town's other sporting teams include netball, cricket, tennis, equestrian, basketball, athletics and soccer.

A BMX track was constructed along Alma Treloar Reserve where it was opened to the public in 2020.

There is a large children's playground, a fenced off leash dog park, a skate bowl, public toilets and plenty of parking all located at Alma Treloar Reserve.

=== Township Committee ===
Cockatoo has a committee that lobbies local and state governments for funding and local recognition of the town; the committee meets quarterly and discusses local issues and projects.

== Transport ==
Bus stop on Bailey Road

The area is served by bus route 695 operated from Belgrave by Ventura Bus Lines. This service is extended to Westfield Fountain Gate shopping centre on Friday/Saturday (695F) and to Dandenong Market on Tuesdays. This route is about to undergo an extensive overhaul including operating to a 40-minute frequency on weekdays until 10 pm. Other improvements include a new Sunday timetable and a Saturday timetable operating from 6 am to 10 pm. Cockatoo is indirectly served by route 838 (Emerald to Fountain Gate Shopping Centre via Berwick) provided by Cardinia Transit, which connects with route 695 at Emerald.

Cockatoo has a railway station on the Puffing Billy Railway. The Puffing Billy service generally runs once or twice daily and continues from Cockatoo to Gembrook. Cockatoo station consists only of a platform with a small (non-original) station building which is usually unstaffed.

== Wright Forest ==
Entrance to Wright Forest

Wright Forest, often referred to locally as Wright's Forest, a 161-hectare reserve to the northwest of the town, is managed by Parks Victoria and is a fauna sanctuary. The forest has scars of the Ash Wednesday fires that swept through the area in 1983 with some trees still showing charred bark. The forest is home to many animal species such as the brushtail possums, wombats and many bird species. The forest has many tracks for bush walkers, the main one being the Emerald to Gembrook trail. This recently came under fire for its title as a beginners' walking trail; lack of signage left some walkers lost and its steep gradients resembled an experienced walking track. Other trails wind through the forest and are colour-coded.

== See also ==
- Shire of Pakenham – Cockatoo was previously within this former local government area.
- Cockatoo railway station
