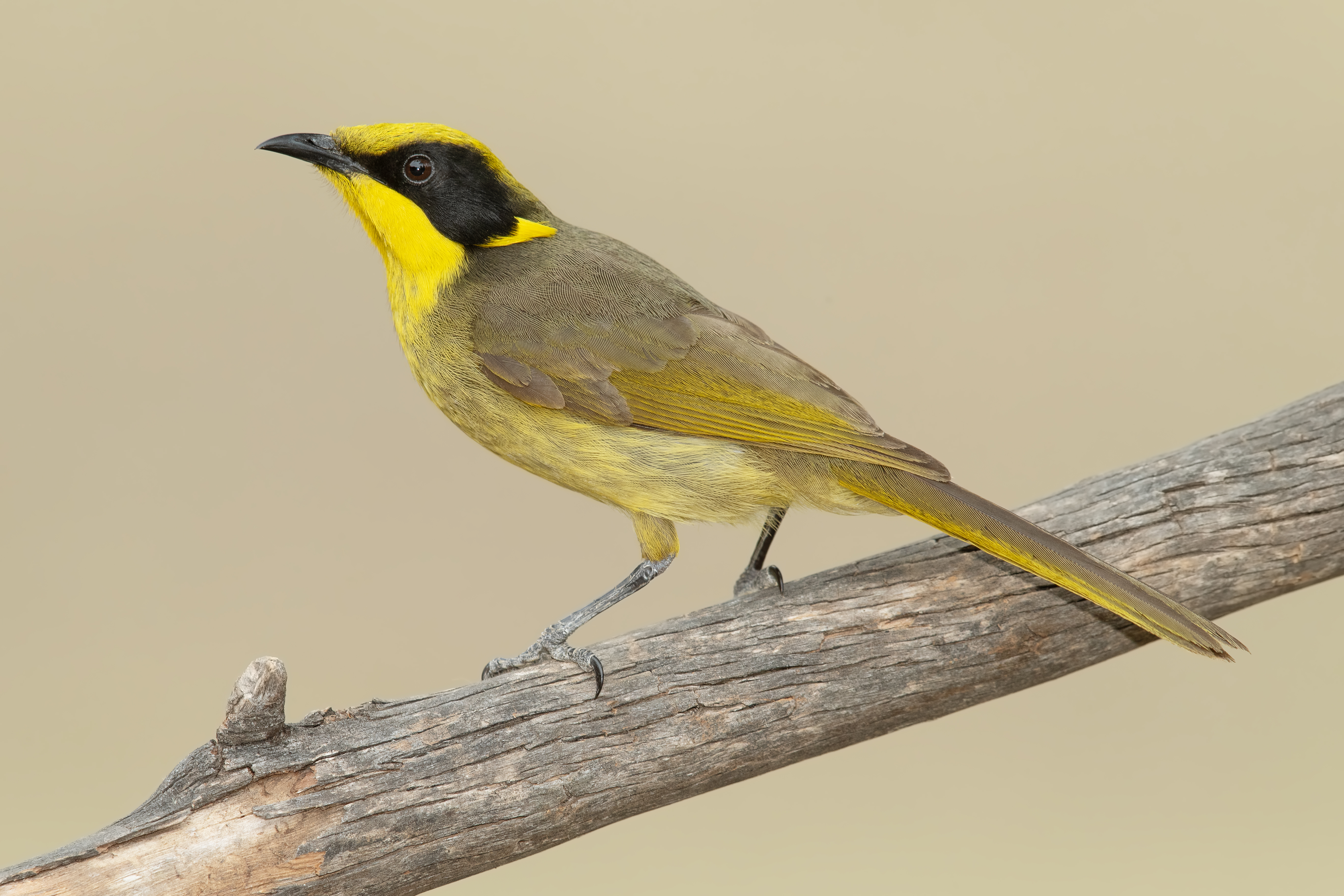

Conservation status
- Least Concern (IUCN 3.1)

Scientific classification
- Kingdom: Animalia
- Phylum: Chordata
- Class: Aves
- Order: Passeriformes
- Family: Meliphagidae
- Genus: Lichenostomus
- Species: L. melanops

Binomial name
- Lichenostomus melanops (Latham, 1801)

= Yellow-tufted honeyeater =

Species of bird

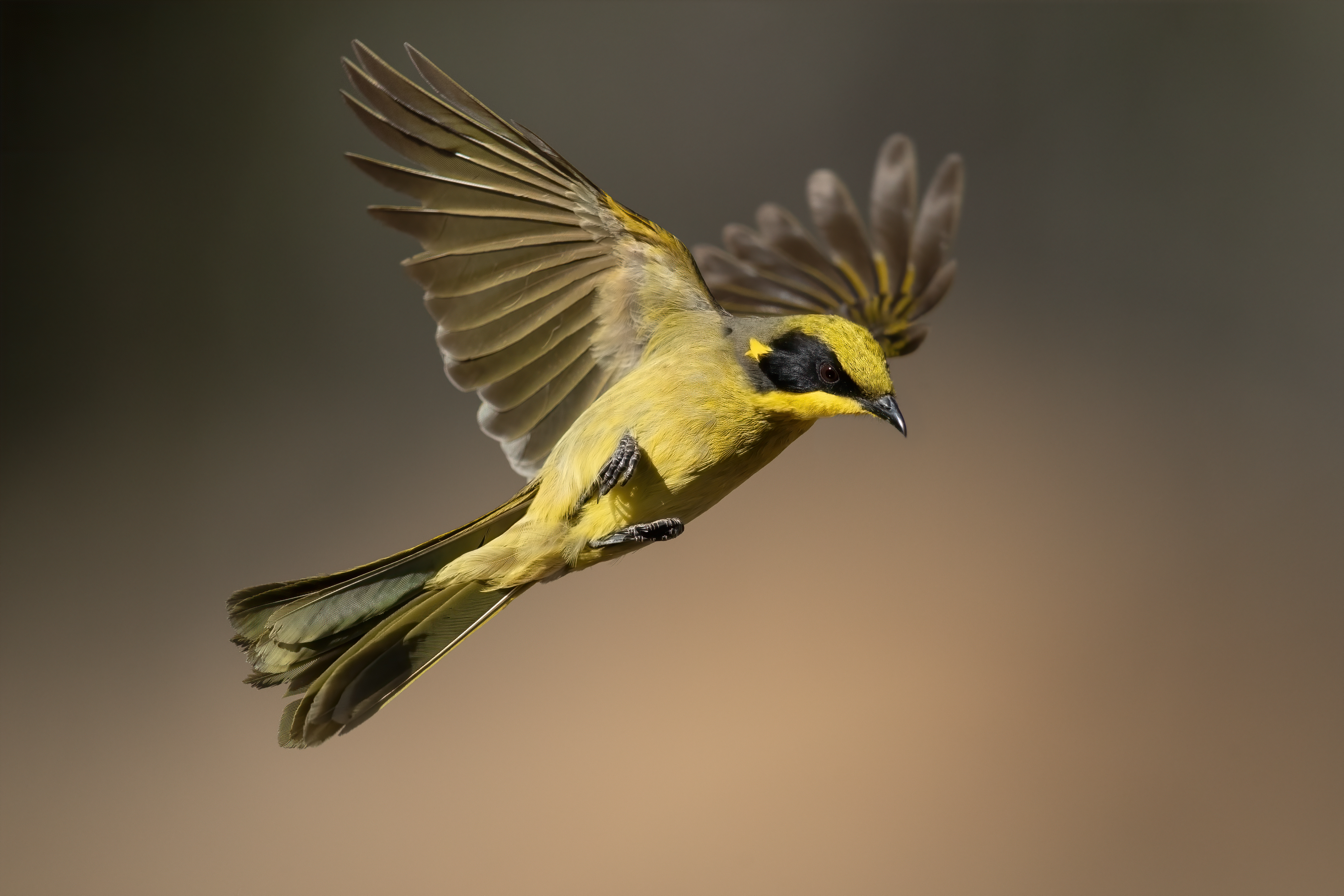
Yellow-tufted honeyeater near Lithgow, New South Wales

The yellow-tufted honeyeater (Lichenostomus melanops) is a passerine bird found in the south-east ranges of Australia. A predominantly black and yellow honeyeater, it is split into four subspecies.

== Taxonomy ==
The yellow-tufted honeyeater was first described by the English ornithologist John Latham in 1801, and given two different binomial names: Muscicapa auricomis and Turdus melanops. The latter name was retained as a nomen protectum, and the former a nomen oblitum, as the epithet melanops has been used consistently for over a century. It belongs to the honeyeater family Meliphagidae. More recently, DNA analysis has shown honeyeaters to be related to the Pardalotidae, and the Petroicidae (Australasian robins) in a large corvid superfamily; some researchers include all these families in a broadly defined Corvidae. The generic name Lichenostomus is derived from the Ancient Greek leikhēn 'lichen, callous' and stoma 'mouth'; the specific epithet melanops derives from Ancient Greek melas 'black' and opsis 'face'.

=== Subspecies ===
Four races are recognised:

- L. m. cassidix, helmeted honeyeater, is restricted to a 5 km length of remnant bushland along two streams in the Yellingbo Nature Conservation Reserve, 50 km east of Melbourne, in Victoria. It is the brightest and largest subspecies, weighing 28–32 g (0.99–1.13 oz). In 2003, there were 103 individuals in the wild with 20 breeding pairs known, as well as a further 34 birds in captivity at the Healesville Sanctuary.
- L. m. gippslandicus, Gippsland yellow-tufted honeyeater
- L. m. melanops, Sydney yellow-tufted honeyeater
- L. m. meltoni, inland yellow-tufted honeyeater, is smaller and duller in plumage with a smaller tuft, which was described by G. M. Mathews in 1912.

== Description ==
The yellow-tufted honeyeater is 17–23 cm (6.7–9.1 in) long, with females usually smaller. It has a bright yellow forehead, crown and throat, a glossy black mask and bright golden ear-tufts. The back is olive-green to olive-brown on wings and tail, and the underparts are more olive-yellow. The bill and gape are black, eyes brown, and legs grey-brown.

== Distribution and habitat ==
The yellow-tufted honeyeater occurs from south-east Queensland through eastern New South Wales and across Victoria. Its preferred habitats are dry open sclerophyll forests and woodlands dominated by eucalypts with shrubby undergrowth, as well as mallee, brigalow and cypress-pine (Callitris).

The helmeted honeyeater subspecies is largely restricted to dense vegetation along riverbanks, dominated by the mountain swamp gum (Eucalyptus camphora) with a dense understorey of woolly tea-tree (Leptospermum lanigerum), scented paperbark (Melaleuca squarrosa), saw-sedge (Gahnia), ferns and tussock grasses.

== Behaviour ==
Yellow-tufted honeyeaters are a noisy, active species in colonies from a few up to a hundred. It aggressively defends territories around flowering trees. It has a great variety of calls from a warbled "tui-t-tui-t-tui", a whistled "wheit-wheit", a sharp "querk" to a harsh contact-call "yip" or "chop-chop".

Adult & nestlings Girraween, S. Queensland

=== Diet and Foraging ===
The diet of the yellow-tufted honeyeater is primarily arthropods, such as a variety of insects and spiders, and occasionally snails. It also feeds on lerps and honeydew, nectar and sap flows from eucalypts, occasionally fruit and flowers. It takes insects in flight and by probing the bark of tree-trunks and limbs.

=== Breeding ===
Breeding takes place between July and March (mostly from September to January), with one or two broods each season. The nest is a cup-shaped structure of dried grasses, bits of bark and other plant material, bound with spider webs and lined with fur and feathers, hung by its rim in dense shrubbery or regrowth. Two or three eggs, each measuring 23 mm × 17 mm (0.91 in × 0.67 in), are laid, pinkish in colour, blotched with pale reddish- or buff-brown. The eggs are incubated mostly by the female for 14–16 days. The nestlings are brooded by the female and fed by both sexes and any helpers, fledging at 13–15 days post-hatch and usually becoming independent by 6 weeks. The nests are parasitized by the fan-tailed cuckoo (Cacomantis flabelliformis), pallid cuckoo (Cacomantis pallidus) and shining bronze-cuckoo (Chrysococcyx lucidus).

== Conservation ==
Yellow-tufted honeyeaters, as a species, are not listed as threatened on the Australian Environment Protection and Biodiversity Conservation Act 1999 or on any state-based legislation. However, at the subspecies level, the helmeted honeyeater (L. m. cassidix) is considered to be threatened:

- This subspecies is listed as endangered on the Australian Environment Protection and Biodiversity Conservation Act 1999.
- This subspecies is listed as threatened on the Victorian Flora and Fauna Guarantee Act (1988). Under this Act, an Action Statement for the recovery and future management of this species has been prepared.
- On the 2007 advisory list of threatened vertebrate fauna in Victoria, the helmeted honeyeater is listed as critically endangered.
