= Yellingbo Nature Conservation Reserve =

Protected area in Victoria, Australia

- IUCN category Ia (strict nature reserve)
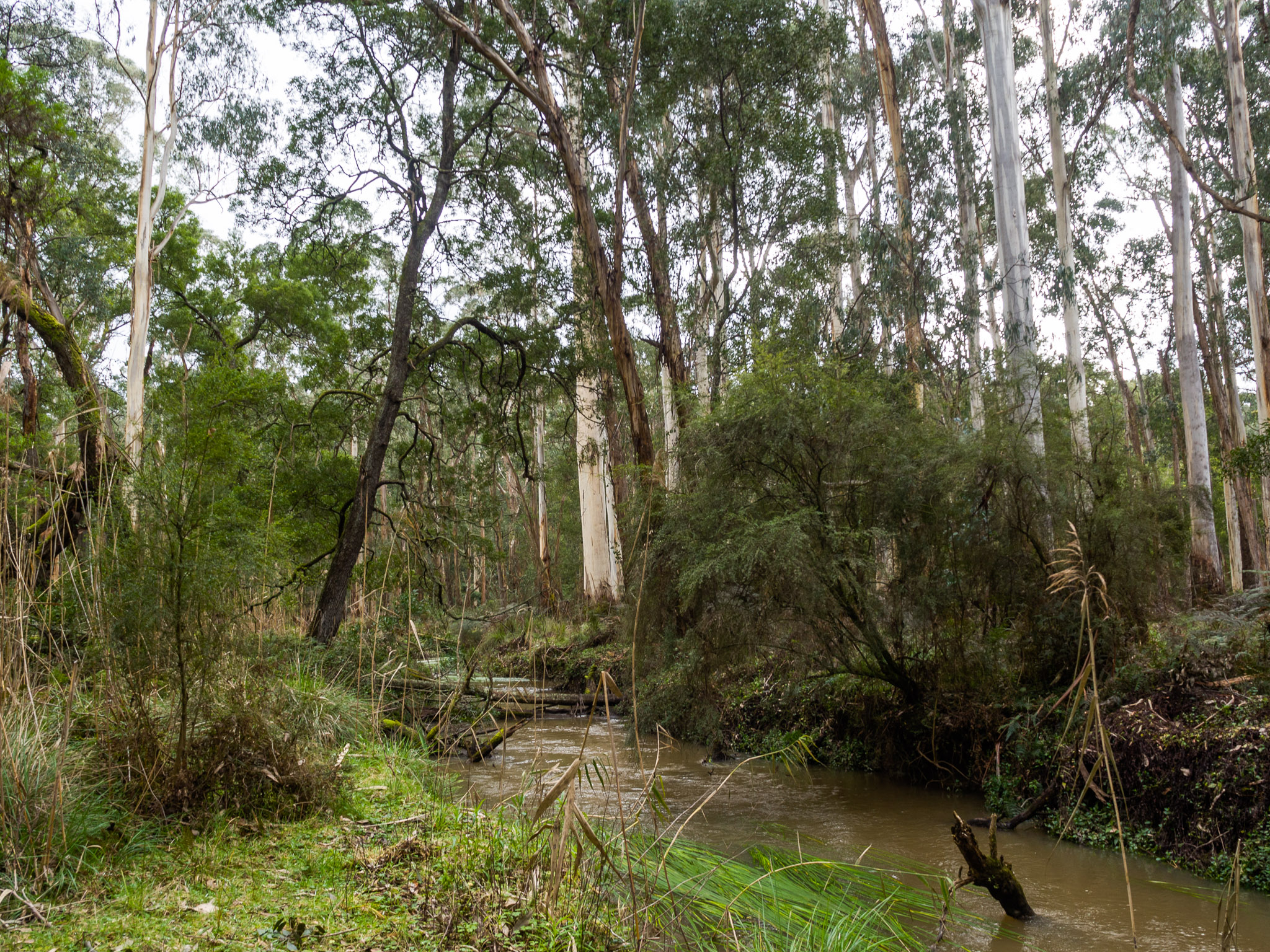
- Volunteers assisting with revegetation work, planting 1,955 plants on 30 April 2016.

- Location within Victoria
- Location: Victoria
- Nearest city: Yellingbo
- Coordinates: 37°50′S 145°29′E
- Area: 590 ha (1,500 acres)
- Established: 1965
- Governing body: Parks Victoria

Established in 1965, the Yellingbo Nature Conservation Reserve is located 45 km east of Melbourne in the Upper Yarra Valley, near the towns of Yellingbo, Launching Place, Yarra Junction, Hoddles Creek, Cockatoo, Emerald, Monbulk and Seville. Yellingbo Nature Conservation Reserve is a narrow riparian reserve with stream-frontage land along the Woori Yallock, Shepherd, Cockatoo, Macclesfield and Sheep Station Creeks.

The total reserve area at Yellingbo Nature Conservation Reserve is approximately 590 hectares comprising several separate areas principally along the local creek systems and is surrounded by privately owned properties.

As an outstanding protected area for habitat and species protection, the reserve is managed by Parks Victoria which also manages adjoining freehold land along Cockatoo Creek, owned by the Victorian Trust for Nature, as if it were part of the reserve.

Yellingbo Nature Conservation Reserve is the only place where all Victoria's state terrestrial emblems, helmeted honeyeater, Leadbeater's possum and pink heath, can be found in the one place.

Yellingbo Nature Conservation Reserve has been assigned the International Union for the Conservation of Nature (IUCN) Category 1A (Strict nature reserve) for Protected Areas. Category 1A protected areas are managed primarily for science.

‘Yellingbo’ means "today" in the Woiwurrung language.

== History ==
In 1965, with increasing community concern about declining helmeted honeyeater numbers, and following recommendations from the Victorian Ornithological Research Group and the Bird Observers Club (now BirdLife Australia) some areas, including sections of public land along the Woori Yallock, Cockatoo and Sheep Station Creeks, were reserved as the Yellingbo State Wildlife Reserve by the Victorian Government for wildlife conservation. Subsequently, several adjoining areas were acquired by Government by purchase or donation, increasing the protected area. In 1994 the Victorian Land Conservation Council recommended that most of these, as well as some other areas, should be consolidated as the Yellingbo Nature Conservation Reserve. Since then, further small parcels of land have been added to the reserve.

== Flora, fauna and vegetation ==
Yellingbo Nature Conservation Reserve protects a diversity of flora and fauna including approximately 285 native flora species and 230 native vertebrate species. Significant species include the Leadbeater's possum, helmeted honeyeater, Epacris impressa (heath), Eastern Mourning Skink Lissolepsis coventryi, Green Scentbark Eucalyptus fulgens, powerful owl Ninox strenua, Growling grass frog Litoria raniformis.

Vegetation

Yellingbo Nature Conservation Reserve protects areas of Sedge-rich Eucalyptus camphora Swamp Community, the only known occurrence and which is considered to be of national significance. The vegetation of Yellingbo Nature Conservation Reserve is composed of the following recognisable communities: along Cockatoo Creek pure stands of Eucalyptus camphora exist with an understorey of mainly Carex and Cyperus species; at the edges there are dense shrublands of Leptospermum lanigerum or Melaleuca squarrosa; Eucalyptus camphora, Acacia melanoxylon, Eucalyptus ovata and Eucalyptus obliqua occur on drier terraces along Cockatoo Creek; Eucalyptus viminalis mainly exists along Sheepstation and Woori Yallock Creeks; Eucalyptus radiata, Eucalyptus obliqua and Eucalyptus ignorabilis exist mainly along drier slopes throughout the reserve in sclerophyll forest. The understorey tends to be sparse to patchily dense.

Leadbeater's possum Gymnobelideus leadbeateri

A small geographically isolated population of Leadbeater's possum was discovered in lowland swamp forest at Yellingbo Nature Conservation Reserve in 1986. This population is the only known extant lowland population, occurring in habitat that is very different to that of the possum's core range in Victorian Central Highlands (montane ash forests). This adds to the conservation importance of the lowland population. The Leadbeater's possum, as the faunal emblem of Victoria, is an iconic Australian species. Since European colonisation the Leadbeater's possum population has suffered a widespread decline and has restricted distribution in its range due to a lack of mature trees with hollows that the possum requires for denning. The Leadbeater's possum is listed as ‘Threatened’ under the Victorian Flora and Flora and Guarantee Act 1988, and ‘Endangered’ under the Commonwealth Environment and Biodiversity Protection Act 1999.

Helmeted honeyeater Lichenostomus melanops cassidix

The helmeted honeyeater was first discovered in 1867, and its range has greatly diminished since that date. Clearing of land in the Yarra Valley for agriculture and the draining of the Koo Wee Rup Swamp from the 1880s destroyed most of the habitat of the helmeted honeyeater. Yellingbo Nature Conservation Reserve provides habitat for the last wild population of Victoria's only endemic bird and its avifaunal emblem. The helmeted honeyeater is critically endangered (IUCN 2001 criterion B2abii, iii, v), is listed as Threatened in Schedule 2 of Victoria's Flora and Fauna Guarantee Act 1988 and classified as Critically Endangered on the Advisory List of Threatened Vertebrate Fauna in Victoria – 2013. It is listed as Endangered under the Commonwealth Environmental Protection and Biodiversity Conservation Act 1999.

== Environmental issues and threats ==
Yellingbo Nature Conservation Reserve is under considerable threat from such events as altered hydrology, declining native vegetation, pest animals and plant, and inappropriate fire regimes. Conservation management of the reserve is complex, with half of the original vegetation in patchy distribution. Invasive weeds include blackberry, gorse, Spanish heath, ragwort and St John's wort, and introduced predators such as foxes, Fallow and Samba deer. A major threat to the helmeted honeyeater comes from another native bird, the bell miner (Manorina melanophrys).

The Eucalyptus camphora and Eucalyptus ovata have been declining in health since the 1970s. The decline of health of the native vegetation in Yellingbo Nature Conservation Reserve is a complicated issue, a key contributor is likely the increased levels of nitrogen that encourage nitrate leaching and weed growth as the reserve is surrounded by intense agriculture. Dieback may also be caused by changed stream flow through the swamp arising from a loss of floodplain, siltation and water-logging of some areas.

The fragmented quality of Yellingbo Nature Conservation Reserve adds to the complexity of managing the reserve for conservation. Managers of surrounding private land have an important role in the conservation of biodiversity values of Yellingbo Nature Conservation Reserve, particularly for providing habitat corridors. Small reserves such as Yellingbo Nature Conservation Reserve are important for preserving endemic species of certain taxa but they require intensive management and need to be carefully protected. Threats such as introduced predators or fire can disease can obliterate a species in a single reserve. Zoos Victoria is pushing for sites other than Yellingbo Nature Conservation Reserve to be secured as a matter of urgency.

The helmeted honeyeater is vulnerable to catastrophes such as fire, as fire will most likely cause severe damage to breeding territories. Availability of suitable breeding habitat limits the helmeted honeyeater's reproduction ability. Expansion of habitat and limiting the further loss and degradation of present habitat, and supplementary feeding are key actions for effective management of the species. The current helmeted honeyeater population is recognised to have low genetic diversity which makes it vulnerable to inbreeding depression, and this lowers its ability to evolve to changing environments.

The conservation of the endangered Leadbeater's possum is one of Australia's most controversial forestry issues. Outside of Yellingbo Nature Conservation Reserve, one of the key threats to the possum is widespread clearfell logging, which significantly impacts on the quality of the habitat. Also clearfell logging results in fragmented habitat, long-term habitat loss, and an increased risk of fire. The cessation of clearfell logging and a major expansion of reserves are immediately needed to limit the risk of extinction of Leadbeater's possum.

== Management ==
Since the establishment of Yellingo Nature Conservation Reserve, there have been a number of management plans in place to manage the nature reserve, the helmeted honeyeater, and the lowland Leadbeater's possum including: Yellingbo Nature Conservation Reserve Management Plan (2004), Helmeted honeyeater recovery plan : 1989–1993, National Recovery Plan for the Helmeted Honeyeater (2008).

Published in 2013, the Yellingbo Investigation Final Report prepared by the Victorian Environmental Assessment Council (VEAC) outlined a number of recommendations for the response of the Victorian Government. The report states that the ‘goal of saving the helmeted honeyeater and the lowland Leadbeater's possum can be achieved in the long-term through integrated management process. Traditional conservation approaches are not relevant to Yellingbo as a large amount of remnant vegetation is on private land. A collaborative approach to managing the reserve and surrounding area is vital for the success of these species’. The report included a range of recommendations aimed at improving management arrangements including establishing a consolidated Yellingbo Conservation Area, appointing a co-ordinating committee to promote co-operation and to phase out grazing from the area's stream frontages. The Victorian government supported all of VEAC's recommendations in full or in principle, and the government and other lead agencies are implementing the accepted recommendations. Goals for implementation are improving the conservation of the biodiversity and ecological values, including the endangered helmeted honeyeater and the lowland Leadbeater's possum.

In November 2015, the establishment of the Yellingbo Conservation Area Coordinating Committee was announced that will establish an Action Plan and co-ordinate partnerships to help achieve better environmental outcomes. The Yellingbo Conservation Area Coordinating Committee will include a representative from key stakeholders: Melbourne Water, Parks Victoria, Cardinia Shire Council, Yarra Ranges Council, Department of Environment and Primary Industries, Zoos Victoria, Port Phillip and Westernport Catchment Management Authority, and Trust for Nature.

Friends of the Helmeted Honeyeater Inc

In 1965 the management of the helmeted honeyeater commenced at Yellingbo Nature Conservation Reserve. The population was 200 at that time and declined to a critical level in the 1980s. In 1989 the Victorian Government commenced a recovery program, a recovery team was established and the program was reviewed and updated in 2008 supported by the Victorian and Commonwealth governments.

When the population of the helmeted honeyeater reached a critically low level of 50 birds in May 1989, there was public interest in saving the helmeted honeyeater and the Friends of the Helmeted Honeyeater Inc was formed. The Friends main aims are to protect existing habitat and plant future habitat for the helmeted honeyeater, to raise awareness about the plight of the helmeted honeyeater and to enlist broad community support for the recovery project. The Friends are active in the recovery effort, providing voluntary support and labour and restoration of habitat. The group has been instrumental in attracting political support.

Friends of the Leadbeater’s Possum Inc

Established on National Threatened Species Day, 7 September 2004, a group of volunteers established the Friends of Leadbeater’s Possum Inc to give a voice to the Leadbeater's possum population. In addition to working towards achieving the proposed Great Forest National Park to provide security to Leadbeater's possum populations into the future, the group support projects at Yellingbo Nature Conservation Reserve.

The Leadbeater's Possum Advisory Group

Established in 2013, the aim of the Leadbeater's Possum Advisory Group is to provide recommendations that support the recovery of the possum, while maintaining a sustainable timber industry. The Advisory Group is co-convened by Zoos Victoria and the Victorian Association of Forest Industries, with representation from VicForests, Parks Victoria, and the Leadbeater's Possum Recovery Team.

== Benefits to biodiversity and the ecosystem ==
Ultimately, the greatest benefit of the management of Yellingbo Nature Conservation Reserve has been saving the helmeted honeyeater and the lowland Leadbeater's possum populations from extinction. Over the last 40 years, volunteer labour has positively contributed to weed and pest control, revegetation, fencing and other targeted conservation actions. After decades of effort to save the helmeted honeyeater and Leadbeater's possum, many are concerned with a lack of progress. However, it is evident that without this effort the helmeted honeyeater species, and possibly others species, would have become extinct.

As at May 2016, the wild population of helmeted honeyeater is about 200, and is on an upwards trend. This has been due to a number of changes in the recovery program over the last few years. These changes have included predator training for the captive-bred birds before release, and releasing at an older age (now released at 12-months of age) in four-year old revegetation. A greater understanding of the health of the ecology of the area, including soil testing, has had a positive impact on the habitat. The main issue affecting the helmeted honeyeater continues to be lack of habitat.

An annual population monitoring of the last surviving lowland Leadbeater's possum population was completed in May 2015. The population was counted at 48 individuals made up of ten family groups. The numbers were considered stable in the previous 12-month period, following a population decline of 60% over previous decades. Fifteen groups have been lost since 2003 due to decline in the condition of the vegetation of the reserve.

As part of its ‘Fighting Extinction’ program, Zoos Victoria manage captive-bred programs for the genetically-distinct lowland population of Leadbeater's possum, and the helmeted honeyeater. The Leadbeater's possum captive breeding program at Healesville Sanctuary commenced in May 2012, to prevent extinction of this population. As at October 2015, 16 individuals were held as part of the breeding program. This captive population aims to provide insurance against the extinction of the last lowland populations at Yellingbo. Since 1989, Zoos Victoria has been involved in the helmeted honeyeater recovery program. Their work has included supplementing wild populations through captive breeding, and providing opportunities for visitors to connect with this iconic bird. Zoos Victoria play an important role in conducting research to improve captive breeding success and help monitor the survival of helmeted honeyeaters after release.

There has been progress in phasing out stream-side cattle grazing licences in the Yellingbo Conservation Area to improve the habitat for the Leadbeater's possum, the helmeted honeyeater, and other threatened species. This will continue to improve the biodiversity values of the area's waterways through better water quality and increased protection of native vegetation. Improvements to the condition of these riparian strips supports the required habitat for both the helmeted honeyeater and the Leadbeater's possum. Partners continue to raise funds for purchase of adjacent land, a purchase of additional 3 hectares announced on 12 May 2016 by Trust for Nature. Both the Friends of Leadbeater’s Possum Inc and the Friends of the Helmeted Honeyeater Inc regularly undertake revegetation works.

Funding support

In the 2014–15 budget the Victorian Government announced a $3.2 million revegetation program that will build habitat at Yellingbo Nature Conservation Reserve. The revegetation program will see more than 80,000 understorey plants planted to increase habitat diversity and insect availability, which will have a positive impact on the resident species’ diet. The government has committed to progressively phasing out approximately 186 water frontage and grazing licences by 2018. This is in the aim of improving riparian habitat and river health in the conservation reserve.

In April 2014, the Victorian Government allocated $11 million over five years to support implementation of all recommendations made by the Leadbeater's Possum Advisory Group. The 13 recommendations and 48 resulting actions are being implemented to assist in the conservation of the Leadbeater's possum.

In 2015 Greening Australia commenced a three-year project to increase habitat and improve vegetation condition to support wild populations of the helmeted honeyeater and Leadbeater's possum. Greening Australia will work with six partner agencies and two friends groups to deliver: improved habitat quality for these species and enhanced connectivity between existing populations; increased duration and availability of food resources and availability of nesting sites for helmeted honeyeaters through additional 650,000 trees and shrubs; and increased spatial extent of Eucalyptus camphora woodland and associated riparian vegetation by 100 hectares.

== Access ==
There is no general public access to the reserve, though birdwalks and counting tours are organised by the Friends of the Helmeted Honeyeater and through BirdLife Australia.
