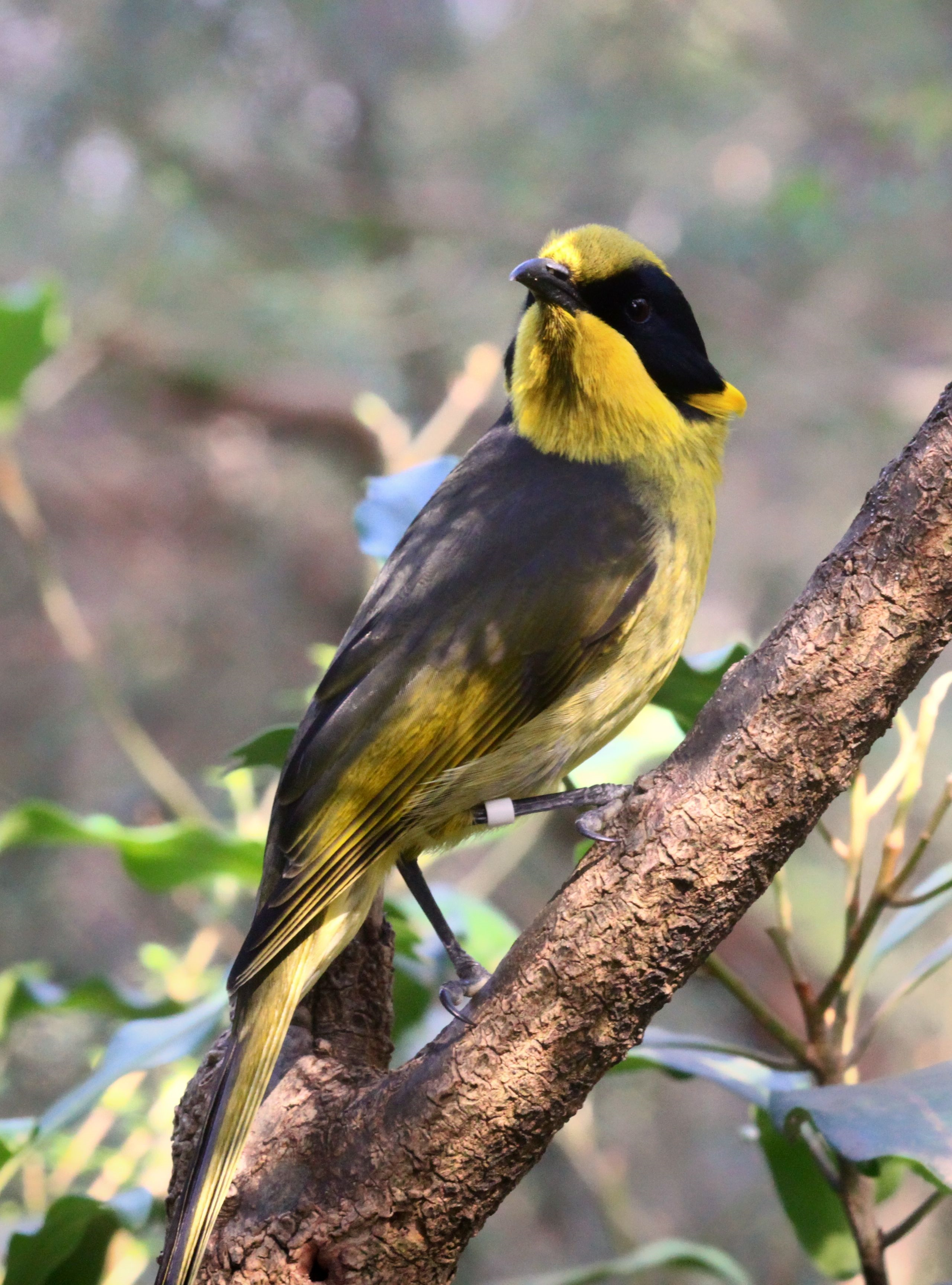

Conservation status
- Critically endangered (EPBC Act)
- CITES Appendix II

Scientific classification
- Kingdom: Animalia
- Phylum: Chordata
- Class: Aves
- Order: Passeriformes
- Family: Meliphagidae
- Genus: Lichenostomus
- Species: L. melanops
- Subspecies: L. m. cassidix

Trinomial name
- Lichenostomus melanops cassidix (Gould, 1867)

Synonyms
- Ptilotis cassidix Gould, 1867; Lichenostomus cassidix

= Helmeted honeyeater =

Subspecies of bird

The helmeted honeyeater (Lichenostomus melanops cassidix) is a passerine bird in the honeyeater family. It is a distinctive and critically endangered subspecies of the yellow-tufted honeyeater, that exists in the wild only as a tiny relict population in the Australian state of Victoria, in the Yellingbo Nature Conservation Reserve. It is Victoria's only endemic bird, and was adopted as one of the state's official symbols.

== Taxonomy ==
The helmeted honeyeater is one of four subspecies of the yellow-tufted honeyeater. The taxonomic history of L. m. cassidix is complicated. Schodde and Mason affirm its subspecific status but suggest that there is intergradation across eastern Victoria and south-eastern New South Wales between it and the nominate subspecies L. m. melanops. This conclusion disallows L. m. gippslandicus as a taxon, and suggests that cassidix occurs more widely through West Gippsland than is currently recognised. However genetic research, conducted on behalf of Victoria's helmeted honeyeater recovery team by Hayes, does not support Schodde and Mason's subspecific arrangement, but confirms the distinctiveness of cassidix both as a taxon and the limits of its current geographic range to the Yellingbo area.

== Description ==
The helmeted honeyeater is the largest and most brightly coloured of the yellow-tufted honeyeater subspecies. It has a distinctive black mask between the yellow throat, pointed yellow ear-tufts and the fixed "helmet" of golden plushlike feathers on the forehead, with a dull golden crown and nape demarcated from the dark olive-brown back and wings. The underparts are mainly olive-yellow. It is 17–23 centimetres (6.7–9.1 in) long, weighing 30–40 grams (1.1–1.4 oz), with males larger than the females.

== Distribution and habitat ==
Historically, helmeted honeyeaters were patchily distributed in the mid-Yarra and Western Port catchments of central southern Victoria, in the South Eastern Highlands IBRA bioregion. Their range and population declined steadily through the 20th century, with the population reaching a low of 15 breeding pairs and about 50 individuals in late 1989, the year a recovery program began. Former colonies at Cockatoo and Upper Beaconsfield had become extinct not long before as a consequence of the Ash Wednesday bushfires of February 1983. Following the implementation of the recovery program the population increased to a peak of about 120 individuals in 1996, but has since declined to about 20 wild breeding pairs.

The wild population of the helmeted honeyeater is now restricted to a five km length of remnant bushland along two streams in the Yellingbo Nature Conservation Reserve near Yellingbo, about 50 km east of central Melbourne, with a small colony of birds bred in captivity established near Tonimbuk in the Bunyip State Park within the historic range of the subspecies. Captive breeding colonies are held at Taronga Zoo in Sydney and at Healesville Sanctuary, 18 km (11 mi) north of Yellingbo.

The birds inhabit dense riparian vegetation along riverbanks, subject to flooding and dominated by mountain swamp gum with a dense understorey of scented paperbark and woolly tea-tree, and of sedges and tussock grasses. Historically, the honeyeaters have also occupied manna gum riparian forest. Key habitat elements include the presence of decorticating (peeling) bark, closely spaced eucalypt stems and dense undergrowth.

== Behaviour ==
Helmeted honeyeaters are sedentary, territorial and aggressive towards other bird species. In areas of suitable habitat their territories are clumped into colonies with some degree of communal defence of the colony area. Pairs rarely leave their territories, though some birds wander during the non-breeding period in search of food.

=== Breeding ===
Territories are about 5000 m^{2} in size. The breeding season is protracted, lasting from July until March. The nest is cup-shaped and placed in the outer branchlets of a tree or shrub; it is made of grass and bark, bound with cobwebs, decorated with spider egg-sacs, and lined with soft material. The first eggs are laid in mid-August and the last in mid-January to late February. Although some pairs make up to nine nesting attempts during this period, three is more usual. The average clutch size is two, with new clutches often laid before the young of the previous clutch have become independent. The incubation period is 14 days, the nestling period 10–14 days, with the chicks becoming independent about 40 days after hatching. The mean number of young raised to independence annually is 1.5 for each pair. Males undertake most nest defence activity, and share in feeding the young, while females do most of the nest building, incubation and brooding.

Once they fledge, the young birds disperse from their parents’ territories. Females may reside temporarily near nectar flows, or near other honeyeater neighbourhoods before returning to their natal colony and mating at the beginning of the next breeding season. Males may try to establish territories next to those of their parents.

=== Feeding ===
The honeyeaters eat invertebrates, nectar, lerps, honeydew, and eucalypt or other plant sap (manna). They spend much time gleaning lerps from foliage, invertebrates from behind decorticating bark, and making repeated visits to places where manna is weeping from damaged eucalypt and melaleuca branches. They may sometimes forage away from their breeding habitat on drier slopes and in heathland. Chicks are primarily fed on insects.

== Status and conservation ==
As of November 6, 2014 The helmeted honeyeater is listed as critically endangered on the Australian Environment Protection and Biodiversity Conservation Act 1999, and as threatened on the Victorian Flora and Fauna Guarantee Act (1988). On the 2007 advisory list of threatened vertebrate fauna in Victoria it is listed as critically endangered.

=== Threats ===
Because of the honeyeater's small population of fewer than 170 wild birds, and very restricted distribution, several factors, such as drought, disease, wildfire and climate change, have the potential to bring the bird to extinction. Particular threats are habitat degradation through die-off and the lack of regeneration of the mountain swamp gum community, because of siltation and waterlogging, or by disease and weed invasion. Nest predation, by a suite of native and introduced predators, may also affect nest productivity.

Harassment by bell miners is known to reduce breeding success in helmeted honeyeaters where their territories abut bell miner colonies, and several former helmeted honeyeater colony sites, as well as other patches of suitable habitat, are currently occupied by bell miners, a situation managed in the Yellingbo Reserve by the selective removal of bell miner colonies.

=== Recovery plan ===
Conservation management of the helmeted honeyeater is directed at both the honeyeater population and its habitat. Population management involves routine monitoring of all breeding attempts, the protection of nests from predators, the establishment of new wild populations through the release of captive-bred birds, the supplementation of wild populations with captive-reared birds by the release of immature birds and the addition of eggs or nestlings to wild nests, and by minimising the risk of inbreeding depression by swapping eggs and nestlings between populations. Habitat management focuses on the control of erosion and siltation in order to help reestablish a natural flood regime within the Yellingbo reserve, as well as to control weeds and pest animals, to revegetate degraded areas, and to rehabilitate habitat on private land adjacent to the reserve.
