= Broadleaf =

Broadleaf may refer to:

- Broad-leaved tree
  - Broadleaf forest
- In agronomy, a term described in contrast to Poaceae. That is to say that broadleaf plants are not grasses:

- Broadleaf weed
- Broadleaf crop

- A member of Magnoliopsida, informal term

== See also ==
- Corymbia confertiflora, also known as the broad leaf carbeen
- Eucalyptus dives, also known as the broad-leaf peppermint
- Rubus moluccanus, also known as the broad-leaf bramble
- Dodonaea viscosa, also known as the broad leaf hopbush
- Ligustrum lucidum, also known as the broad-leaf privet
- Eucalyptus camphora, also known as the broad-leaf sallee
- Lysimachia pendens, also known as the broad-leaf yellow loosestrife
- Allium victorialis, also known as the Alpine broad-leaf allium
