= Wailua River yellow loosestrife =

Wailua River yellow loosestrife is a common name for two very rare species of Hawaiian plants and may refer to:

- Lysimachia filifolia
- Lysimachia iniki
