= Seville East =

- Town
- Interactive map of Seville East
- Coordinates: 37.774°S 145.491°E
- Country: Australia
- State: Victoria
- LGA: Shire of Yarra Ranges
- Location: 55 km (34 mi) from Melbourne; 15 km (9.3 mi) from Lilydale

Government
  - State electorate: Evelyn
  - Federal division: Casey
- Elevation: 149 m (489 ft)

Population
  - Total: 837 (2021 census)
- Postcode: 3139
Localities around Seville East
Gruyere	Gruyere	Woori Yallock
Seville	Seville East	Woori Yallock
Seville	Yellingbo	Yellingbo

Seville East is a town in Victoria, Australia, 46 km north-east of Melbourne's central business district, located within the Shire of Yarra Ranges local government area. Seville East recorded a population of 837 at the 2021 census.

Its post office opened on 5 July 1954 and closed in 1969.
