= Woori Yallock =

- Town
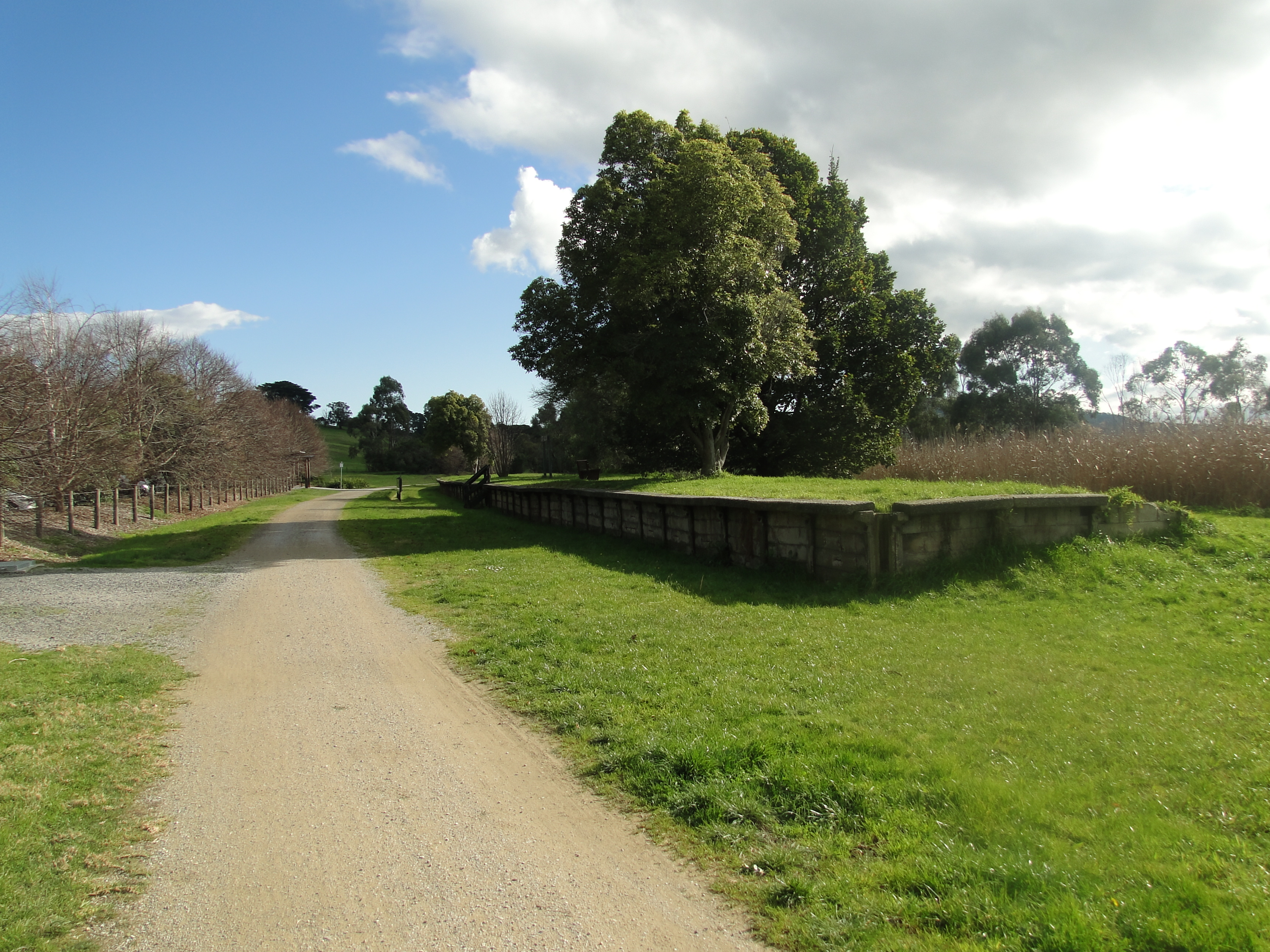
- Walking trail at the Woori Yallock railway station

- Interactive map of Woori Yallock
- Coordinates: 37.778°S 145.528°E
- Country: Australia
- State: Victoria
- LGA: Shire of Yarra Ranges
- Location: 57 km (35 mi) E of Melbourne; 19 km (12 mi) E of Lilydale

Government
  - State electorate: Eildon
  - Federal division: McEwen
- Elevation: 154 m (505 ft)

Population
  - Total: 2,964 (2021 census)
- Postcode: 3139
Localities around Woori Yallock
Gruyere	Badger Creek	Don Valley
Seville East	Woori Yallock	Launching Place
Seville	Hoddles Creek	Launching Place

Woori Yallock is a town in Victoria, Australia, 56 kilometres (35 mi) east of Melbourne's central business district, located within the Shire of Yarra Ranges local government area. Woori Yallock recorded a population of 2,964 at the 2021 census.

The Post Office opened on 1 July 1886 as Woori Yalloak, changing its name to the current spelling around 1911.

It contains a primary school, a football oval, a shopping area and is passed by the Warburton Trail, a walk and cycle track along the dismantled former Warburton railway line.

The town has an Australian Rules football team, the Woori Tigers, competing in the Yarra Valley Mountain District Football League.

== See also ==
- Woori Yallock railway station
