= Lysimachia pendens =

Conservation status
- Critically Imperiled (NatureServe)

Scientific classification
- Kingdom: Plantae
- Clade: Tracheophytes
- Clade: Angiosperms
- Clade: Eudicots
- Clade: Asterids
- Order: Ericales
- Family: Primulaceae
- Genus: Lysimachia
- Species: L. pendens

Binomial name
- Lysimachia pendens K.L.Marr

Species of flowering plant

Lysimachia pendens is a rare species of flowering plant in the family Primulaceae known by the common name broad-leaf yellow loosestrife. It is endemic to Hawaii, where there is a single occurrence known on the island of Kauai. It was federally listed as an endangered species of the United States in 2010.

This shrub was described as a new species in 1997 when one population of Lysimachia filifolia plants was determined to be different from the others and not part of that species. The leaves are wider and hairier than those of L. filifolia. This plant occurs at one location at the headwaters of the north fork of the Wailua River of Kauai, where it grows alongside the newly described Lysimachia iniki. The habitat is made up of wet, mossy cliffs.

This shrub has hanging branches, the new growth covered in tan hairs. The lance-shaped leaves are closely spaced on the branches and measure roughly 2 to 4 centimeters long by 2 to 4 millimeters wide. The flowers have green or red-tinged sepals and red petals each just under a centimeter in length.

The plant is threatened by the invasion of introduced species of plants in its habitat. Landslides have destroyed many of the plants.

There are only eight individuals of this species remaining (as of April 2010).
