= Badger Creek, Victoria =

Badger Creek
- Town
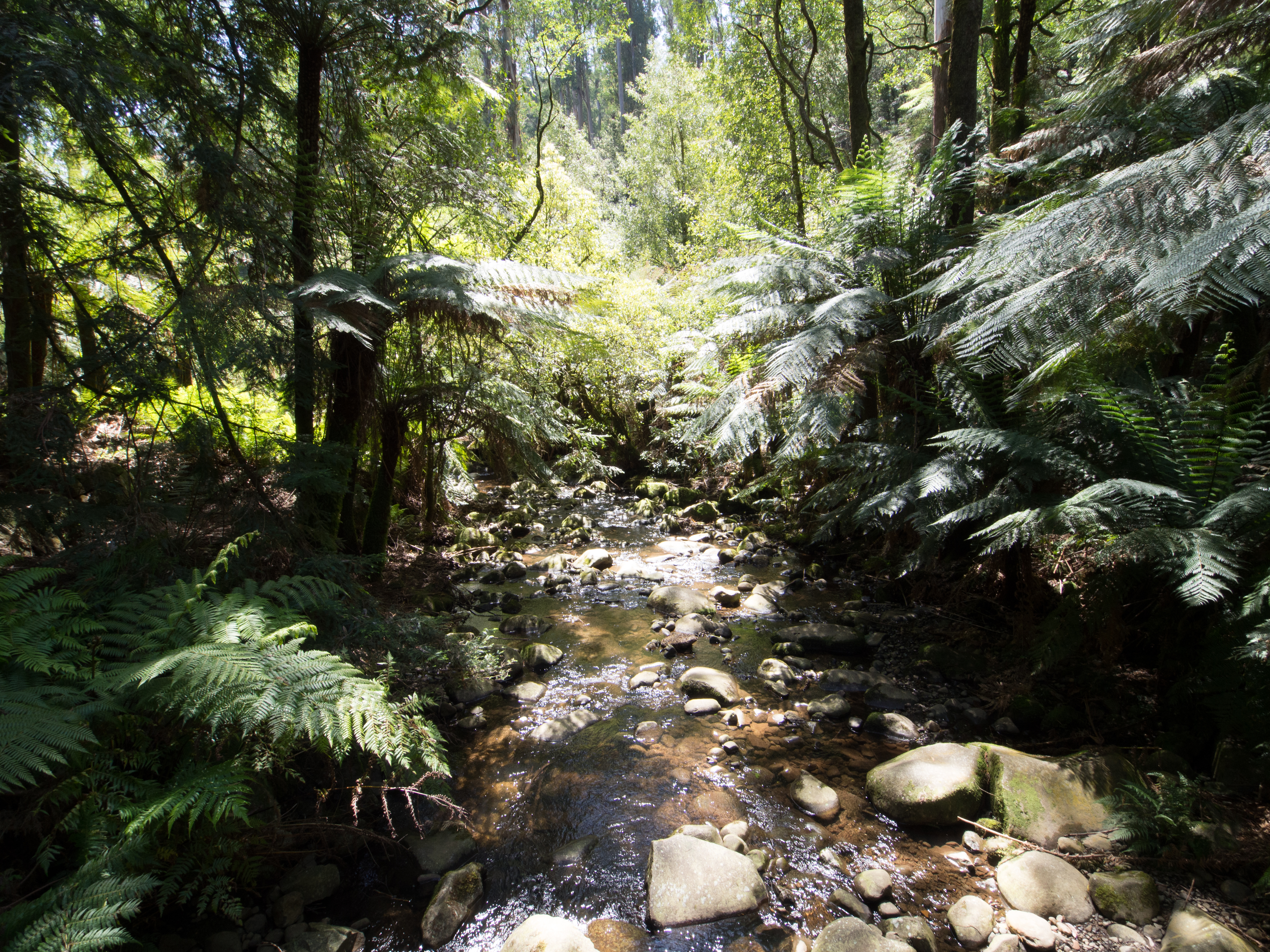

- Interactive map of Badger Creek
- Coordinates: 37.685°S 145.538°E
- Country: Australia
- State: Victoria
- LGA: Shire of Yarra Ranges
- Location: 53 km (33 mi) from Melbourne; 4 km (2.5 mi) from Healesville

Government
  - State electorate: Eildon
  - Federal division: McEwen
- Elevation: 210 m (690 ft)

Population
  - Total: 1,610 (2021 census)
- Postcode: 3777
Localities around Badger Creek
Coldstream	Healesville	Healesville
Coldstream	Badger Creek	Healesville
Gruyere	Woori Yallock	Don Valley

Badger Creek is a suburb of Healesville in Victoria, Australia, 53 km north-east from Melbourne's central business district, located within the Shire of Yarra Ranges local government area. Badger Creek recorded a population of 1,610 at the 2021 census.

Badger Creek is near the Healesville Sanctuary and the former Aboriginal reserve, Coranderrk, now known as the Coranderrk Bushland.

== History ==
The creek was possibly named after the wombats in the area which were often called badgers. Other theories is that is it derived from the Woi Wurrung word badjurr, or that a horse named Badger, owned by one of the pioneering Ryrie brothers, became bogged in the creek

Badger Creek was surveyed as a township in 1894, but was not settled to any extent until some time later. The Coranderrk school opened in 1890, being replaced by the Badger Creek school in 1899. The Post Office opened around 1902 as Badger Creek State School, was renamed Badger Creek around 1907 and closed in 1930.

The weir in the Badger Creek reserve was constructed in 1909 and feeds water to the Silvan Reservoir.

Badger Creek won the 1911 Yarra Valley Football Association (Stevens, Olinda Hotel, Lilydale Trophy) premiership.

=== Heritage listings ===
The following place in Badger Creek is listed on the Victorian Heritage Register:

- MacKenzie Cottage at Healesville Sanctuary, 25 Badger Creek Road

== See also ==
- Coranderrk
