= Gruyere, Victoria =

Gruyere
- Town
- Interactive map of Gruyere
- Coordinates: 37.734°S 145.450°E
- Country: Australia
- State: Victoria
- LGA: Shire of Yarra Ranges
- Location: 51 km (32 mi) from Melbourne; 12 km (7.5 mi) from Lilydale

Government
  - State electorate: Evelyn
  - Federal division: Casey
- Elevation: 174 m (571 ft)

Population
  - Total: 966 (2021 census)
- Postcode: 3770
Localities around Gruyere
Coldstream	Coldstream	Badger Creek
Wandin North	Gruyere	Badger Creek
Seville	Seville East	Woori Yallock

Gruyere is a town in Victoria, Australia, 43 km north-east from Melbourne's central business district, located within the Shire of Yarra Ranges local government area. Gruyere recorded a population of 966 at the 2021 census.

The suburb is often referred to as the "Toorak of the Yarra Valley" (Sir Peter Taylor of Lyndhurst) as it is the choice location for wealthier retirees. Gruyere has a strong farming / agricultural roots with many local farmers with a variety of products such as apples, pears and cattle.

The town is named for a variety of cheese, as the area's history is in the dairy industry. Cahillton Post Office first opened on 20 August 1892. It was renamed Gruyere in 1950 and closed in 1960.

Many argue that the name of the area and subsequently, the town, is actually "Warramate", in reference to the Warramate Hills.

The town has a recreation reserve, community hall, primary school and CFA fire station. Several wineries are located within Gruyere. The primary school is currently closed due to a lack of enrolled students and no staff.
