= Woori Yallock railway station =

Former railway station in Melbourne, Australia

Coordinates: 37°46′31″S 145°31′40″E

Woori Yallock
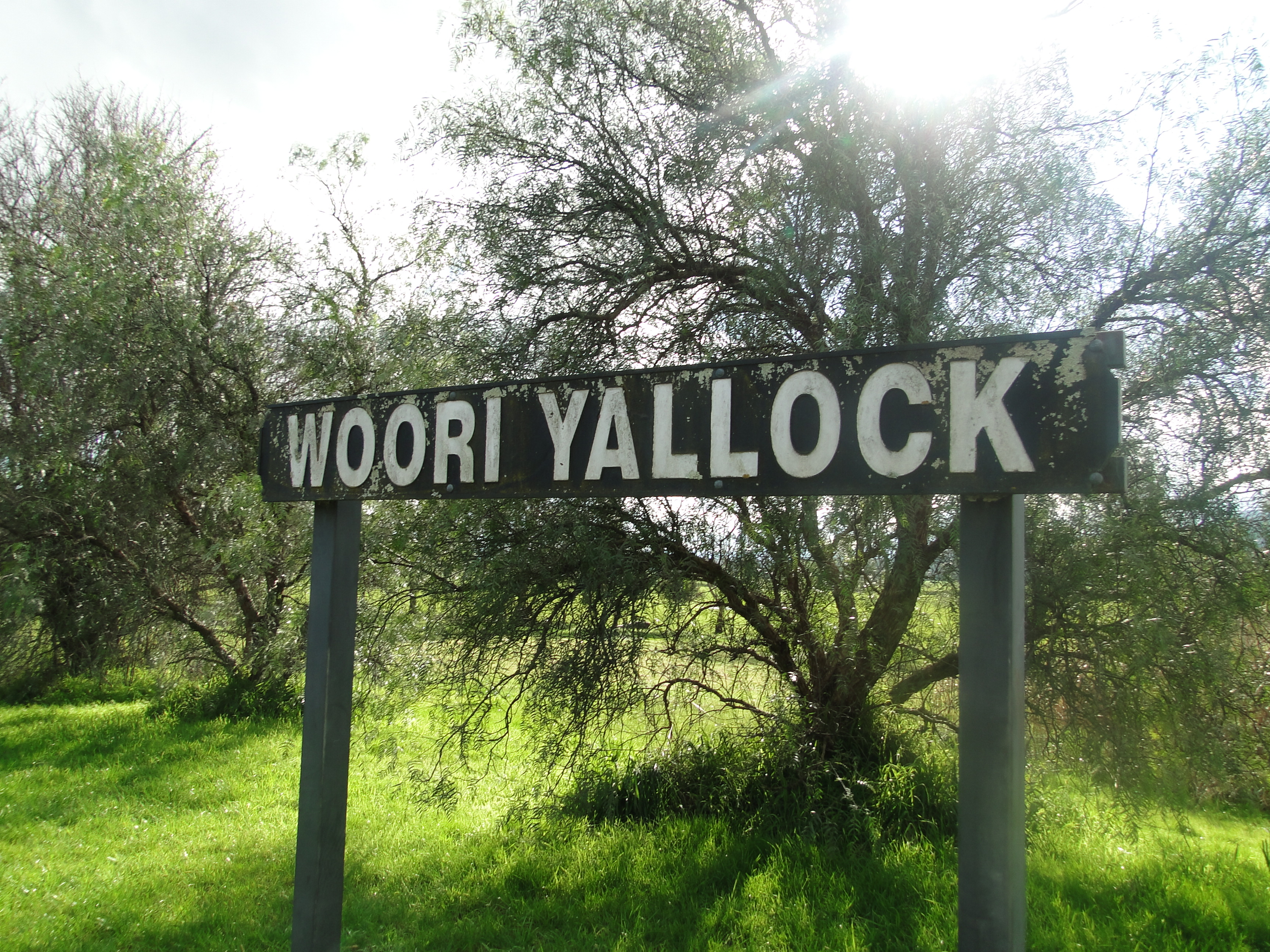

General information
- Line: Warburton
- Platforms: 1
- Tracks: 1

Other information
- Status: Closed

History
- Opened: 13 November 1901
- Closed: 1 August 1965
- Former names: Woori (1914-1916)

Services
Preceding station	VicRail	Following station
Killara towards Lilydale	Warburton line	Launching Place towards Warburton
List of closed railway stations in Melbourne
Location

Woori Yallock was a railway station on the Warburton line in Melbourne, Australia. The station first opened with the line in 1901 as Woori Yallock, being renamed to Woori in 1914 before reverting to the longer name in 1916. until the line's closure in 1965. Today, only a retaining wall for the station platform and sign remain.
