= Yellingbo =

- Town
- Interactive map of Yellingbo
- Coordinates: 37.81°S 145.51°E
- Country: Australia
- State: Victoria
- LGA: Shire of Yarra Ranges
- Location: 48 km (30 mi) from Melbourne; 22 km (14 mi) from Belgrave; 22 km (14 mi) from Lilydale

Government
  - State electorates: Eildon; Monbulk
  - Federal division: Casey

Population
  - Total: 582 (2021 census)
- Postcode: 3139
Localities around Yellingbo
Macclesfield	Seville	Hoddles Creek
Macclesfield	Yellingbo	Hoddles Creek
Macclesfield	Cockatoo	Gembrook

Yellingbo is a town in Victoria, Australia, 48 km east from Melbourne's central business district, located within the Shire of Yarra Ranges local government area. Yellingbo recorded a population of 582 at the 2021 census.

== History ==
The town formed around a store opened by James Claxton in 1883 next to Woori Yallock Creek, and was initially known as "Claxton". When Claxton died his brother-in-law Henry Parslow and nephew Christopher John Parslow continued to run the store, and built a bridge over the Woori Yallock Creek there, whence the town was known as "Parslow's Bridge". The post office opened a receiving office around 1902 as "Parslow's" and a full post office in 1927 with Christopher Parslow as postmaster. In August 1946 it was renamed "Yellingbo" after the last Aboriginal resident, his name literally meaning "today" in the Woiwurrung language. The post office was closed on 23 February 1991.

== The town today ==
Yellingbo's town area contains a public hall, CFA, general store and tennis courts, as well as the Waterfall Art Gallery. The primary school closed in 2015.

== Biodiversity ==
Nearby is the Yellingbo Nature Conservation Reserve, which contains three of the state of Victoria's emblems: The last remaining wild population of the state bird, the helmeted honeyeater (Lichenostomus melanops cassidix). The geographically isolated state animal, Leadbeater's possum (Gymnobelideus leadbeateri). Finally, common-pink heath (Epacris impressa) is the state floral emblem.
