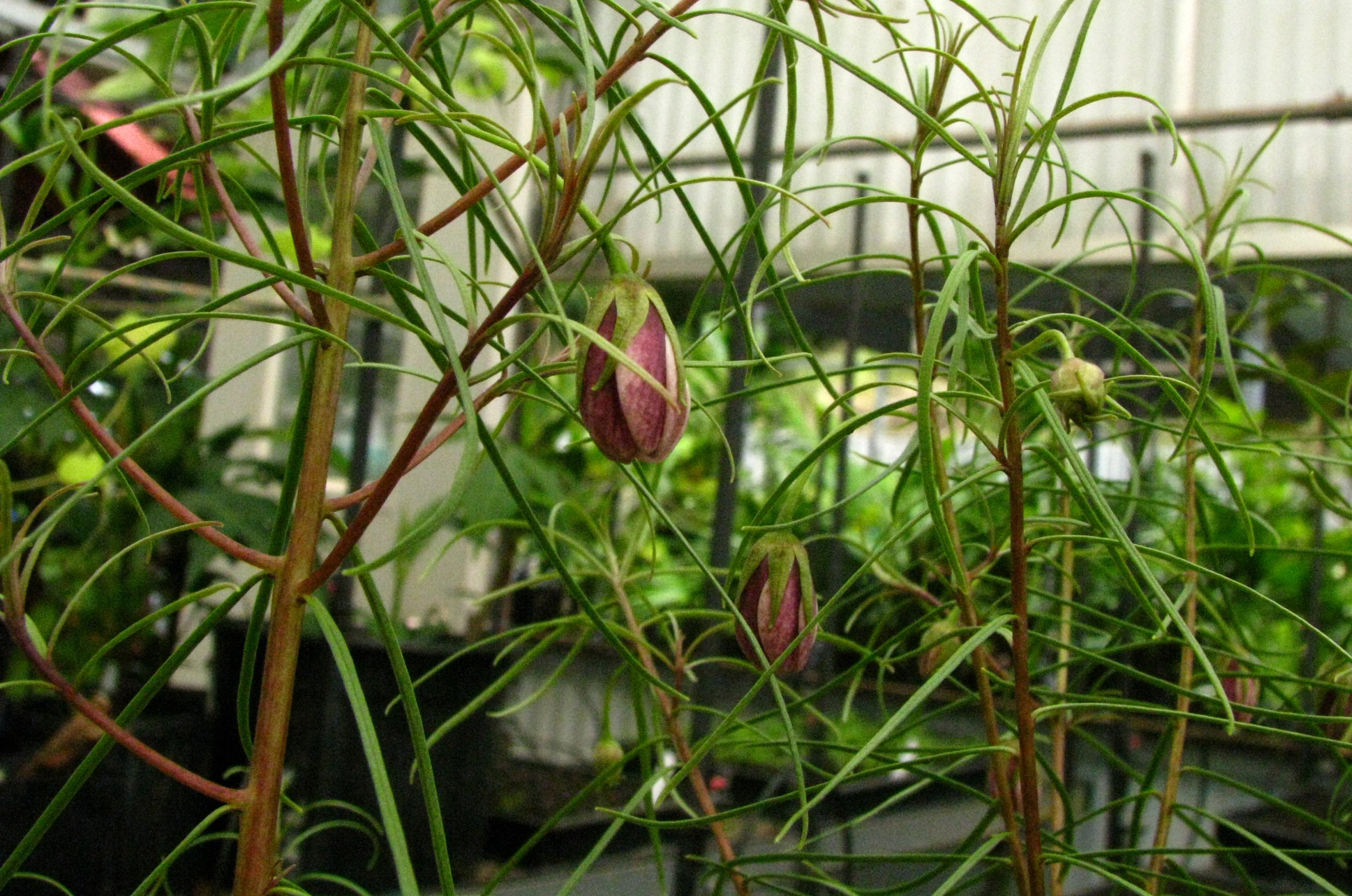

Conservation status
- Critically Imperiled (NatureServe)

Scientific classification
- Kingdom: Plantae
- Clade: Tracheophytes
- Clade: Angiosperms
- Clade: Eudicots
- Clade: Asterids
- Order: Ericales
- Family: Primulaceae
- Genus: Lysimachia
- Species: L. filifolia

Binomial name
- Lysimachia filifolia C.N.Forbes & Lydgate (1916)

= Lysimachia filifolia =

Species of flowering plant

Lysimachia filifolia is a rare species of flowering plant in the Primulaceae known by the common name Wailua River yellow loosestrife. It is endemic to Hawaii, where there are two populations on Oahu and one on Kauai. It is a federally listed endangered species of the United States.

This is a small shrub growing up to about half a meter in maximum height. The leaves are very narrow to threadlike and the flowers are reddish purple. The plant grows on the faces of waterfalls in wet forest habitat.

There are about 130 individuals remaining on the island of Oahu, growing at waterfalls in the Koolau Range. There is a single population on Kauai, just discovered in 2008. Another population of plants on Kauai proved to be members of a different species, Lysimachia pendens.

This plant is threatened by the degradation of its habitat by feral pigs and non-native plant species such as mistflower (Ageratina riparia), ti (Cordyline fruticosa), and umbrella tree (Heptapleurum actinophyllum).
