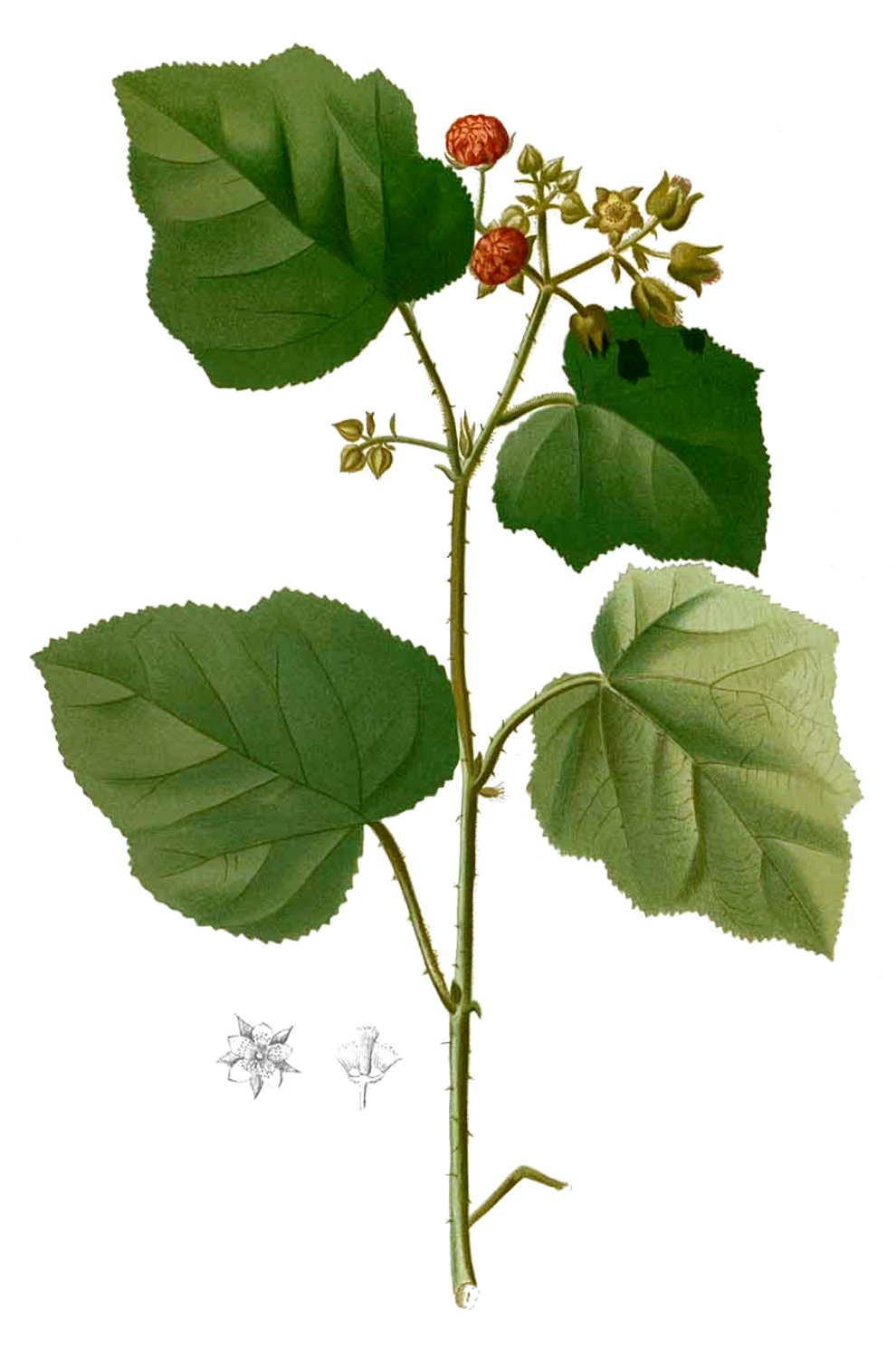

Scientific classification
- Kingdom: Plantae
- Clade: Embryophytes
- Clade: Tracheophytes
- Clade: Spermatophytes
- Clade: Angiosperms
- Clade: Eudicots
- Clade: Rosids
- Order: Rosales
- Family: Rosaceae
- Genus: Rubus
- Species: R. moluccanus

Binomial name
- Rubus moluccanus L.

Synonyms
- List: Rubus acerifolius Wall. ex Kuntze; Rubus chartaceus Kuntze; Rubus dendrocharis (Focke) Focke; Rubus falconeri Kuntze; Rubus fontinalis Kuntze; Rubus glaucocaulis Kuntze; Rubus hasskarlii subsp. dendrocharis Focke; Rubus hiemalis Kuntze; Rubus hillii F.Muell.; Rubus kingii Kuntze; Rubus kurzianus Kuntze; Rubus latifolius Kuntze; Rubus moluccanus var. acerifolius (Wall. ex Kuntze) Kuntze; Rubus moluccanus var. austropacificus P.Royen; Rubus moluccanus var. chartaceus Kuntze; Rubus moluccanus var. dendrocharis (Focke) P.Royen; Rubus moluccanus var. falconeri (Kuntze) Kuntze; Rubus moluccanus var. fontinalis (Kuntze) Kuntze; Rubus moluccanus f. glabrus P.Royen; Rubus moluccanus var. glaucocaulis (Kuntze) Kuntze; Rubus moluccanus var. hiemalis (Kuntze) Kuntze; Rubus moluccanus var. hillii (F.Muell.) Kuntze; Rubus moluccanus var. kurzianus (Kuntze) Kuntze; Rubus moluccanus var. latifolius Kuntze; Rubus moluccanus var. obsoletus C.Presl; Rubus moluccanus var. ochrascens Blume; Rubus moluccanus var. reinwardtii (Kuntze) Kuntze; Rubus moluccanus var. setosolignosus (Kuntze) Kuntze; Rubus moluccanus var. thespesiiphyllus P.Royen; Rubus moluccanus var. trilobus A.R.Bean; Rubus moluccanus var. wawrae (Kuntze) Kuntze; Rubus reinwardtii Kuntze; Rubus setosolignosus Kuntze; Rubus sundaicus var. discolor Blume; Rubus wawrae Kuntze

= Rubus moluccanus =

Molucca bramble

Species of shrub

Rubus moluccanus, the Molucca bramble or broad-leaf bramble, is a species of bramble.

== Description ==
It is scrambling shrub or climber. The leaves are simple with 3–5 lobes; they are 2–15 centimetres (3/4–6 inches) long, 3–10 cm (1 1/4–4 in) wide, and the lower surface is tomentose.

The flowers are pinkish red or white. The red fruit is 1.2 cm (1/2 in) wide.

== Subtaxa ==
The following varieties are accepted:

- Rubus moluccanus var. angulosus Kalkman
- Rubus moluccanus var. discolor (Blume) Kalkman
- Rubus moluccanus var. moluccanus
- Rubus moluccanus var. neocaledonicus Schltr.
- Rubus moluccanus var. obtusangulus Miq.

== Distribution and habitat ==
The species is native to moist eucalyptus forest and rainforest of eastern Australia, distributed from Queensland to Victoria, and to the Indian Subcontinent, Southeast Asia, Malesia, Papuasia, New Caledonia, Vanuatu and the Caroline Islands.

== Uses ==
The fruit is edible without cooking, and is used commercially to a limited extent in jams and sauces. It is used in traditional health care practices.
