= Seville, Victoria =

Seville
- Town
- Interactive map of Seville
- Coordinates: 37.777°S 145.461°E
- Country: Australia
- State: Victoria
- LGA: Shire of Yarra Ranges
- Location: 52 km (32 mi) E of Melbourne; 11 km (6.8 mi) from Lilydale
- Established: 1886; 140 years ago

Government
  - State electorate: Evelyn
  - Federal division: Casey

Area
  - Total: 21.4 km^{2} (8.3 sq mi)
- Elevation: 147 m (482 ft)

Population
  - Total: 2,559 (2021 census)
  - Density: 119.58/km^{2} (309.7/sq mi)
- Postcode: 3139
Localities around Seville
| Wandin North | Gruyere | Seville East |
| Wandin East | Seville | Seville East |
| Silvan | Yellingbo | Yellingbo |

Seville is a town to the east of Melbourne, the capital city of Victoria, Australia, along the Warburton Highway, located within the Shire of Yarra Ranges local government area. Seville recorded a population of 2,559 at the 2021 census.

Seville sits within the Yarra Valley wine region. It is serviced by bus 683 from Chirnside Park to Warburton via Lilydale railway station. The township sits on a dismantled railway line which is now the Warburton Trail, used by walkers, runners, cyclists and horse riders.

A plan for a large scale shopping centre in the land adjacent to the service station was put forward to the council (June 2011) and was finally opened in June 2014.

The town has a primary school, which celebrated its centenary in 1987. It also has an active fire brigade, the Seville CFA. An active community learning centre, the Seville Community House provides short courses and classes on a wide variety of subjects.

The Seville Recreation Reserve is the hub for all sporting activities within the town and is home for football, netball, tennis & cricket teams that compete in local competitions every weekend of the year as well as equestrian activities.

In 2011, the Seville Water Play Park was opened.

The town is home to many wineries, which are highlighted in Shedfest, held annually on the second weekend of October.

The Seville Township Group is a local advocacy community group, dedicated to improving Seville for the local community and surrounds.
