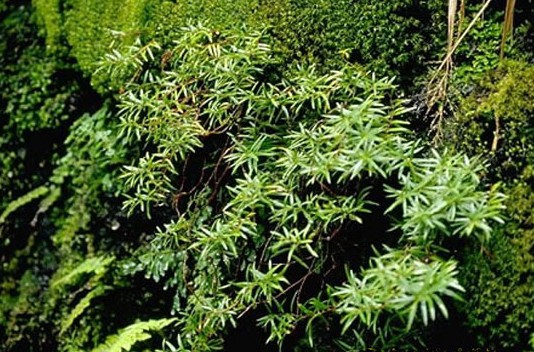

Conservation status
- Critically Imperiled (NatureServe)

Scientific classification
- Kingdom: Plantae
- Clade: Tracheophytes
- Clade: Angiosperms
- Clade: Eudicots
- Clade: Asterids
- Order: Ericales
- Family: Primulaceae
- Genus: Lysimachia
- Species: L. iniki

Binomial name
- Lysimachia iniki Marr

= Lysimachia iniki =

Species of flowering plant

Lysimachia iniki is a rare species of flowering plant in the family Primulaceae known by the common names Wailua River yellow loosestrife and Wailua River island-loosestrife. It is endemic to Hawaii, where there is only one known occurrence existing on the island of Kauai. The plant was federally listed as an endangered species of the United States in 2010.

This plant was discovered in 1992, shortly after Hurricane Iniki tore a specimen off the tall cliffs above Kauai's Wailua River and dropped bits of it where it could be collected. When analysis revealed it was a new species, it was described to science and named for the hurricane. The Hawaiian word `iniki means "sharp and piercing, as wind or pangs of love."

This is a shrub with hairy green hanging branches growing up to 1.5 meters in length. The woody base grows attached to wet, mossy cliffs. The oval leaves are roughly 3 to 5 centimeters long by 2 to 4 wide. The leaves are packed closely together. Funnel-shaped flowers grow in the leaf axils borne on pedicels up to 2.5 centimeters in length. Each flower has lance-shaped green sepals at the base. The flower petals are dark red at the bases and white at the tips. The stamens are dark red. The fruit is a rounded capsule under a centimeter long.

When the plant was described there were at least 25 individuals. By 2010 there were 40 plants remaining in the single location where it is known to grow, by the "Blue Hole" at the headwaters of the north fork of the Wailua River.

Threats to this species include hurricanes; individuals were damaged during Hurricanes Iniki and Iwa. It is threatened by its small population size, which may cause loss of reproductive vigor and genetic variability and makes the species vulnerable to extinction in any one severe event, such as a hurricane. The cliff-dwelling plant is also vulnerable during flooding and landslides. The habitat is vulnerable to invasion by non-native plant species.
