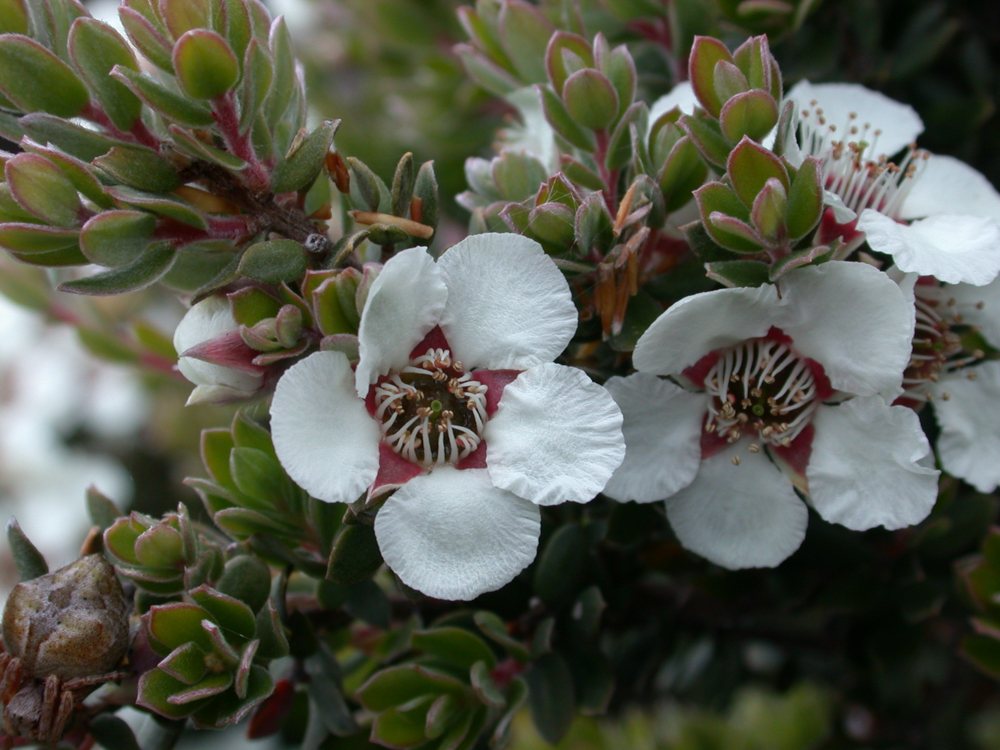

Scientific classification
- Kingdom: Plantae
- Clade: Tracheophytes
- Clade: Angiosperms
- Clade: Eudicots
- Clade: Rosids
- Order: Myrtales
- Family: Myrtaceae
- Genus: Leptospermum
- Species: L. lanigerum

Binomial name
- Leptospermum lanigerum (Sol. ex Aiton) Sm.
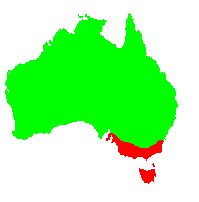

Synonyms
- List: Leptospermum australe Salisb.; Leptospermum lanigerum (Sol. ex Aiton) Sm. var. lanigerum; Leptospermum lanigerum var. montanum Rodway; Leptospermum lanigerum var. pubescens DC.; Leptospermum lanigerum var. pubescens (Willd.) Hook.f. nom. illeg.; Leptospermum microphyllum F.Muell. ex Miq. nom. illeg.; Leptospermum microphyllum var. glaucum F.Muell. ex Miq.; Leptospermum microphyllum Hoffmanns. var. microphyllum; Leptospermum microphyllum var. viride F.Muell. ex Miq.; Leptospermum pubescens Willd. nom. illeg.; Leptospermum pubescens f. angustifolia Miq.; Leptospermum pubescens f. minor Miq.; Leptospermum sericeum Hook.f. nom. inval., pro syn.; Leptospermum splendens Schauer; Philadelphia laniger W.R.Barker, R.M.Barker, Jessop & Vonow orth. var.; Philadelphus laniger Aiton; Philadelphus laniger var. canescens Aiton; Philadelphus laniger Aiton var. laniger; Philadelphus laniger var. piliger Aiton

= Leptospermum lanigerum =

Species of shrub

Leptospermum lanigerum, commonly known as the woolly teatree, is a small tree or medium shrub from the plant family Myrtaceae. Its common name derives from the conspicuously hairy capsules produced as fruit, along with the fine, silky hairs present on branches and leaves. L. lanigerum is widespread in many habitats, particularly in waterlogged areas such as moist, sandy coastal heaths, on river banks, riparian scrub, woodlands and on the fringe of montane grasslands. This species is endemic to Australia, with native populations occurring in New South Wales, South Australia, Tasmania and Victoria.

Flowers possess the typical characteristics present within the genus Leptospermum; five free, white petals, many stamens and five small sepals; although the most distinctive feature is the persistent hairy capsules and the silvery appearance of mature foliage.

L. lanigerum is common and widespread throughout Australia, occurring both as natural populations and cultivated varieties. This species has been used for many years by Indigenous Australians, and is a popular garden plant today.

== Description ==
This small tree to medium-sized shrub is variable in size and shape and present in a number of different forms. Plants can grow as large, spreading or erect shrubs up to 3 metres (9.8 ft) high by 3 metres (9.8 ft) across, or very compact, columnar shrubs, up to 3 m high and 1 metre (3.3 ft) across. L. lanigerum also grows as a slender tree up to 18 metres (59 ft) tall in montane habitats in Tasmania.

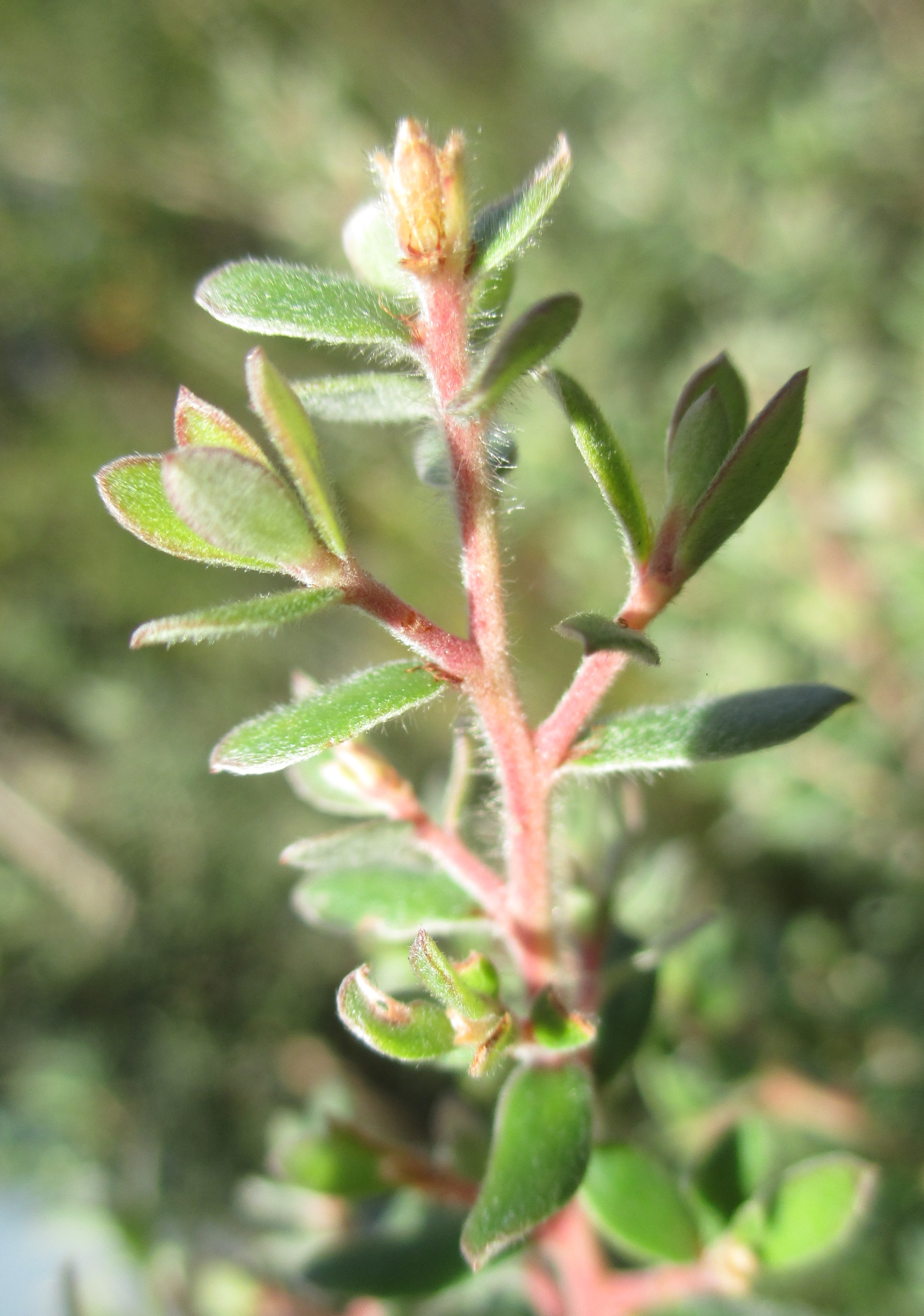
Hairy leaves and stem of L. lanigerum.

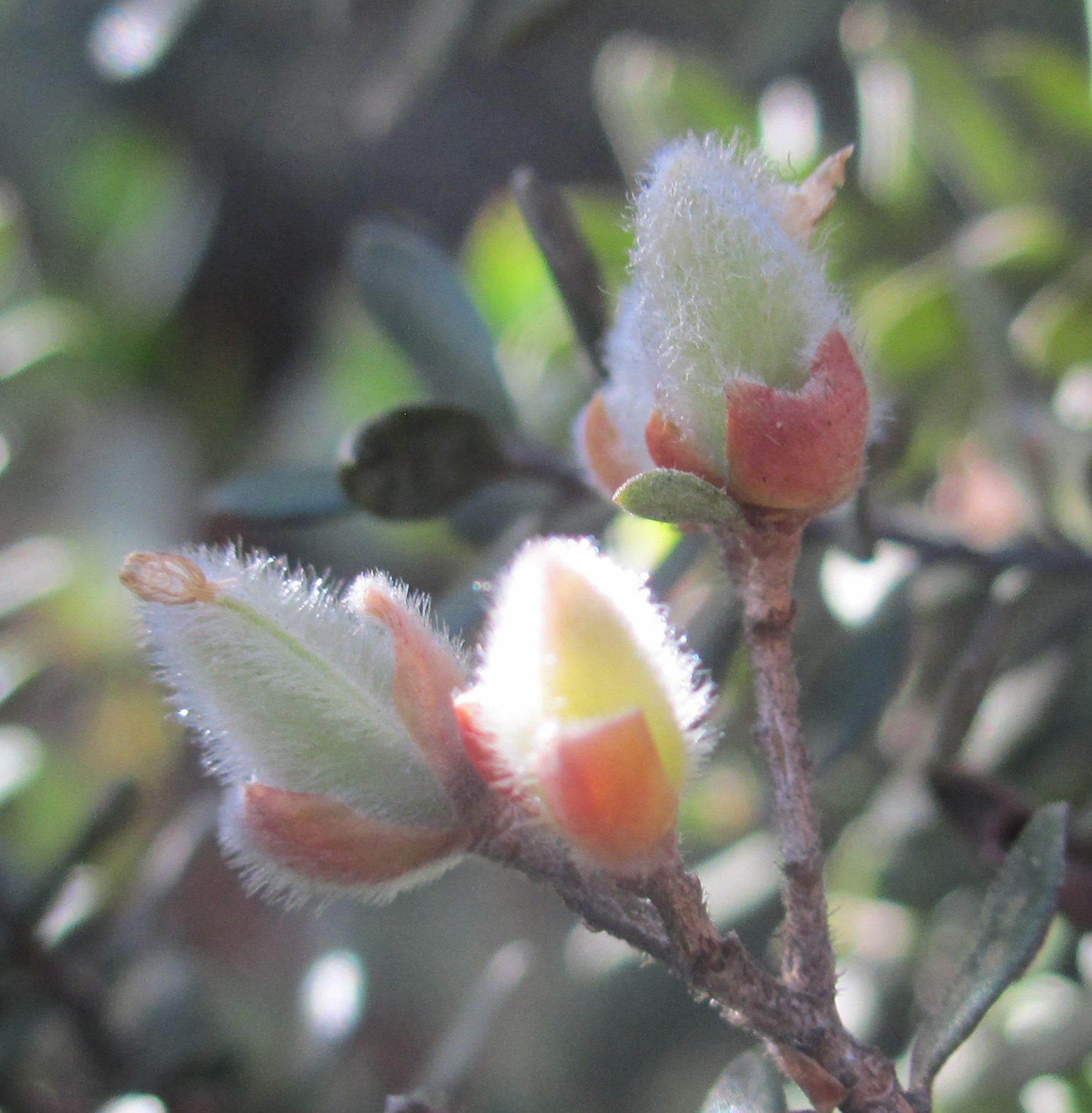
Hairy, new L. lanigerum buds.

=== Leaves ===
Leaves are usually alternately arranged along the stem, oblong in shape and with slightly rolled margins. Leaves vary in size from 4–20 millimetres (0.16–0.79 in), with new growth usually covered in small, soft, silky hairs. These hairs usually cause the foliage to appear silvery grey, however leaves can vary in colour from silvery grey to dark green, or occasionally possess a glossy upper surface. Like all species in the family Myrtaceae, L. lanigerum leaves are dotted with small oil containing glands, and when crushed emit a strong, characteristic aroma. These oil glands allow for easy identification, and detailed analysis of the oils has assisted in the classification and taxonomy of species within the genus Leptospermum.

=== Flowers ===
Leptospermum lanigerum bears the characteristic flowers present within the genus Leptospermum: five distinctly separate, white petals, five small sepals, numerous stamens, along with inferior ovaries. Receptacles and petals grow small soft hairs, with flowers usually measuring about 18mm in diameter. The stamens usually occur in bundles of seven. Numerous flowers are produced either in late spring, early summer or sporadically throughout the year, situated terminally on short side branches. These flowers are mostly bisexual, however L. lanigerum is an andromonoecious species as plants also produce some functionally male flowers.

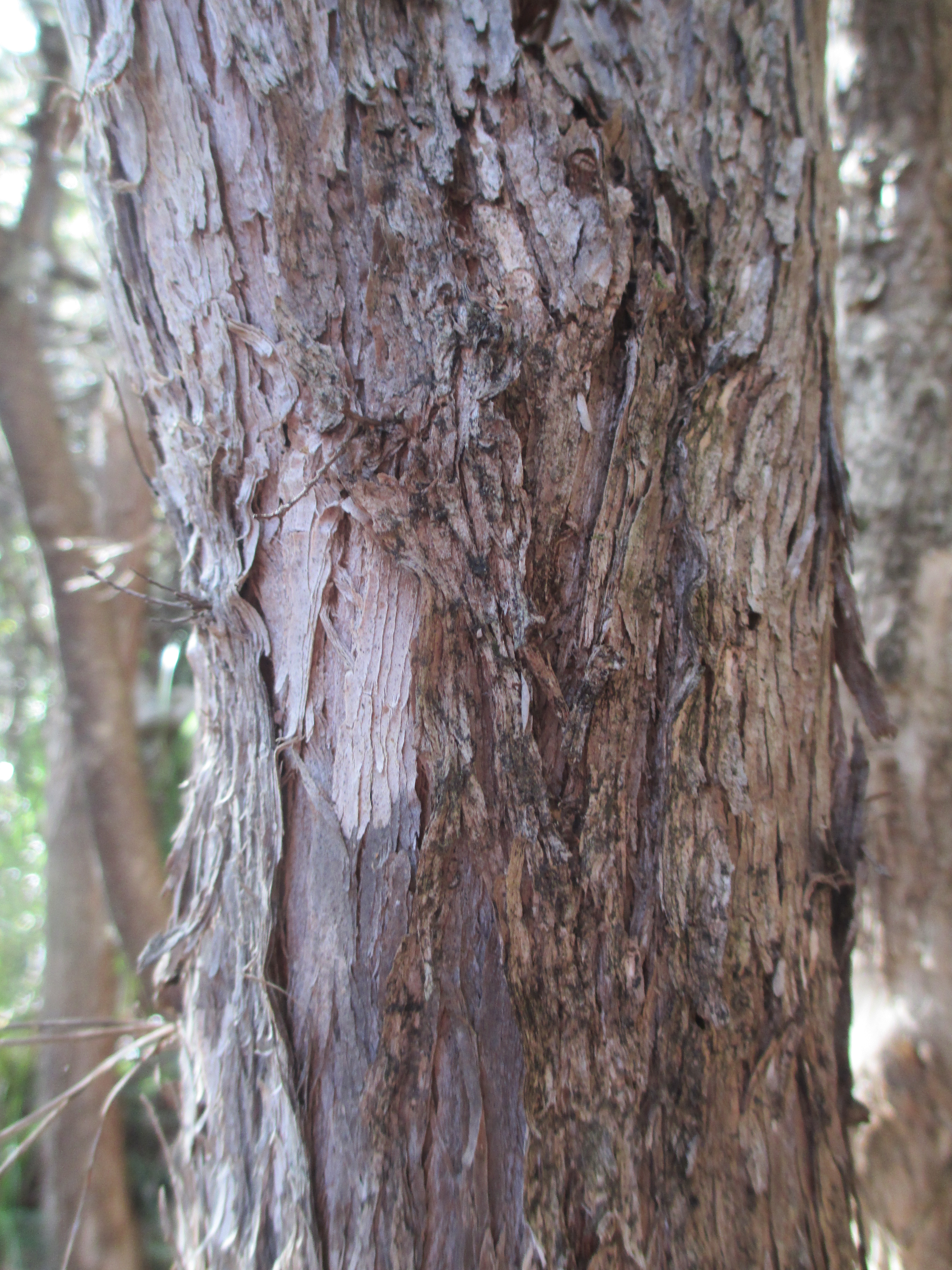
Smooth, papery L. lanigerum bark.

=== Fruit ===
Distinctly hairy when first produced, capsules are usually persistent, each with 4–5 compartments and around 5–10 millimetres (0.20–0.39 in) in diameter. These capsules are situated singularly on short, terminal side branches, distinguishable from Melaleuca spp. whose capsules clasp the stem in distinctive clusters. Encasing seeds in tough, woody capsules provides some protection from damage by predators or insulation from disturbances such as fire. Extreme desiccation or fire is needed, however, to open these capsules, allowing seeds to be released to germinate in the ash enriched seed bed after the first rains following the fire.

=== Bark ===
Leptospermum lanigerum has smooth, light brown, fibrous and papery bark that comes away from the trunk in long strips when removed. This bark helps provide some protection to the trunk and epicormic buds from fire, allowing the tree to potentially grow back when burnt. The bark is very similar to other Leptospermum species.

== Taxonomy ==
This species was first formally described in 1789 by William Aiton in Hortus Kewensis, who gave it the name Philadelphus laniger. In 1797, James Edward Smith transferred the species to the genus Leptospermum as L. lanigerum in Transactions of the Linnean Society of London. The specific epithet (lanigerum), is a Latin word for wool-bearing, describing the silky hairy leaves and hairy buds, shoots and young capsules. The common names for this species, 'woolly tea-tree' or sometimes 'silky tea-tree', are also a result of these distinctive features.

== Distribution and habitat ==
Leptospermum lanigerum is endemic to Australia, mainly distributed within the south eastern states. Native populations are found in eastern South Australia, across Victoria and southern New South Wales, as well as the whole of Tasmania. Plants are common and widespread, predominantly found in wet, swampy areas and along river banks, sandy coastal heaths or within woodlands. L. lanigerum is occasionally found growing in cool temperate rainforest in western Tasmania, however is a doubtful true rainforest species due to the need for disturbances such as fire to release seed. The hardy nature and preferred habitat of this plant makes it useful in riparian restoration and stream bank stabilisation, as they thrive in swampy areas where many other species do not.

In Tasmania, L. lanigerum is a key swamp forest species. Swamp forests form in flat, poorly drained sites and contain a closed tree canopy made from sclerophyllous species of the genera Leptospermum, Acacia and Melaleuca. In Tasmania, L. lanigerum forms tall, dense stands, up to 18m in height. In other Australian states, individuals mainly exist as short, thick shrubs.

Although this species is mainly present at low altitudes, some individuals also grow among sub-alpine vegetation and along the edge of montane grasslands. L. lanigerum is an adaptable species able to adjust to varying aspects and soil types, and although prefers wet areas can grow successfully in drier soil.

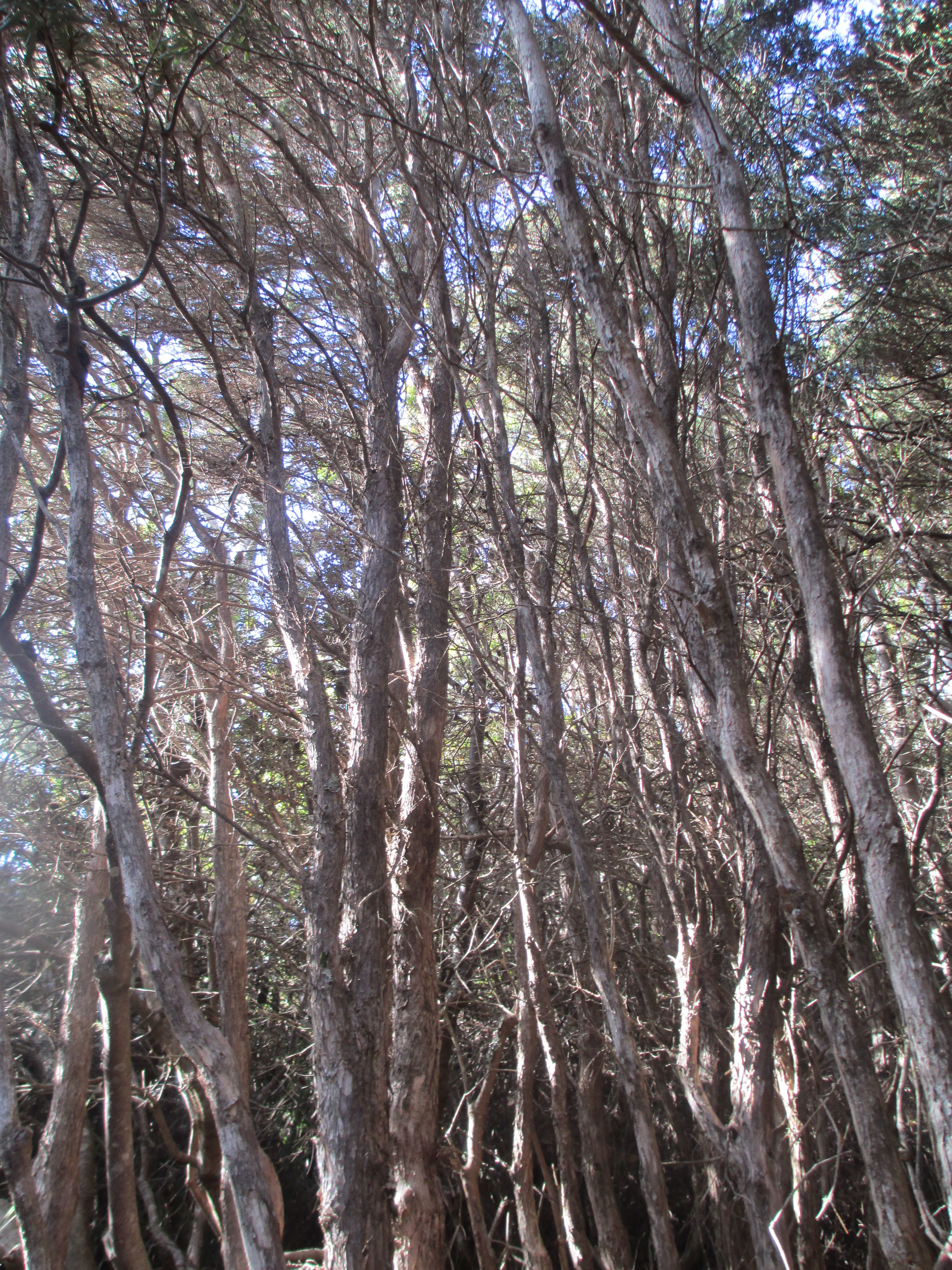
L.lanigerum trees growing in Tasmania.

== Ecology ==
=== Fire ===
L. lanigerum has a very specific relationship with fire. Like many other species within the family Myrtaceae, the seeds of L. lanigerum are encased in woody capsules and often remain on the tree for a number of years after reaching maturity. To be released, capsules must be subjected to fire or some other disturbance. In the days after fire, the ash enriched seed bed along with a little rain provides good conditions for seeds to germinate. The intensity of the fire is important, as too much heat can destroy the seeds as well as the capsules.

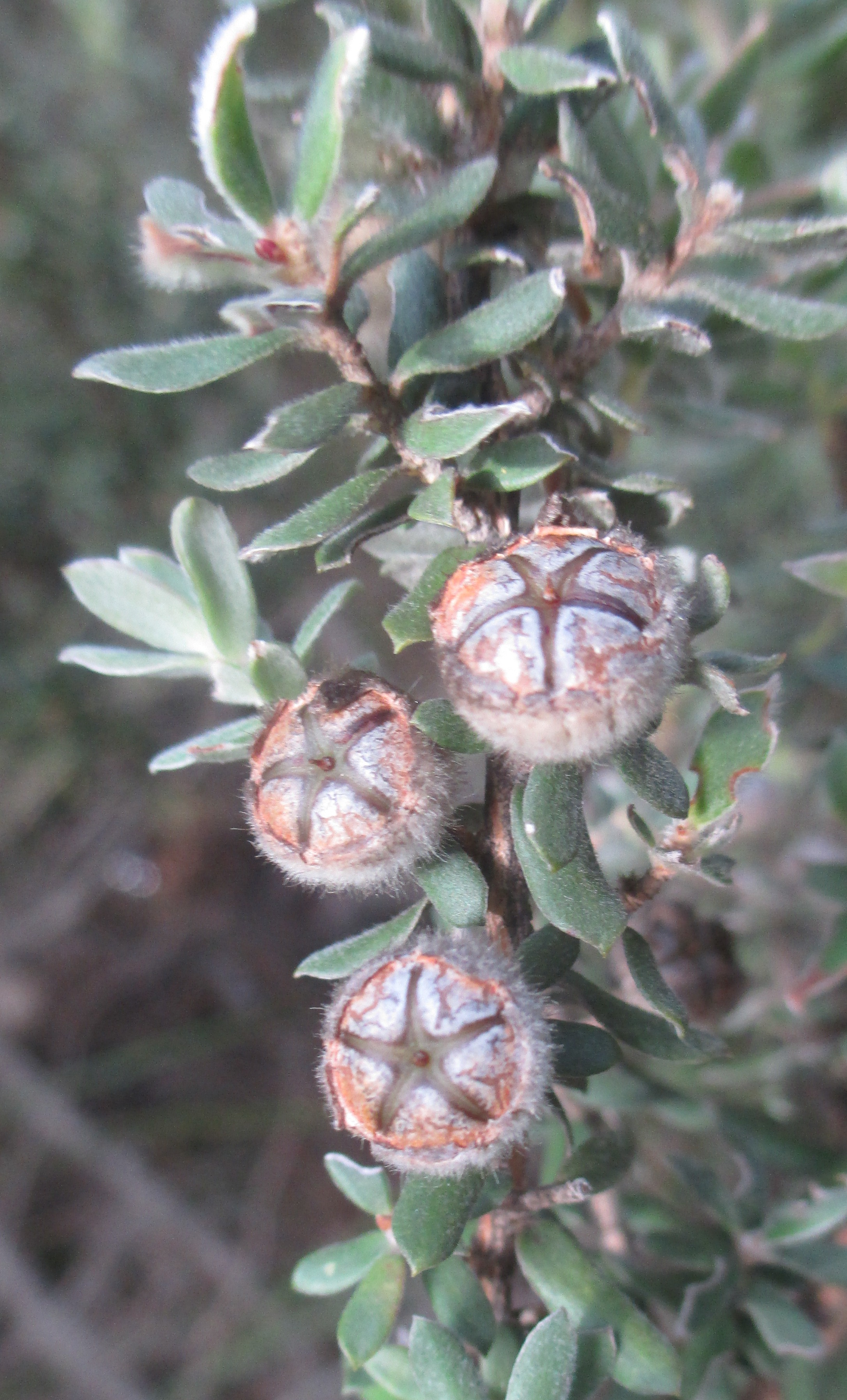
Hairy, woody capsules of L. lanigerum.

Trees can also grow back after a fire, due to the lignotubers and epicormic buds protected by the thick bark. In some cases, where trees are tightly packed, the fire destroys only the main branches leaving the underground portions and protected trunks of the plants to survive. As plants grow back after a fire, other species can take advantage of the light gaps created, leading to a thick mixture of tea-tree, cutting grass and species such as Bauera.

=== Pollination ===
Leptospermum species are pollinated by insects, usually beetles. Each flower contains sweet nectar within the centre which acts as an attractant to beetles. These beetles then carry pollen on all parts of their body, mainly head and legs, to other flowers. The nectar, along with the insects present, also attracts other animals such as birds, making Leptospermum species and other Myrtaceae genera popular garden plants.

=== Seed dispersal ===
Seed dispersal of L. lanigerum is limited, with seeds usually falling to the ground after fire. Dispersal can also occur through wind or water, or transport by insects such as ants. Ants also act as pre-dispersal seed predators however, destroying the capsules whilst still attached to the plant and eating the seeds. L. lanigerum is one of the Leptospermum species most affected by ant predation.

=== Other symbiotic relationships ===
Most Myrtaceae species (including the genus Leptospermum) are mycorrhizal, forming relationships with fungi to assist in increasing root surface area for greater uptake in nutrients. The extent to which this relationship exists is unknown however, with little research available.

=== Diseases ===
Leptospermum lanigerum is a potentially highly susceptible host species to the pathogen Phytophthora ramorum. This pathogen currently causes widespread damage to gardens, nurseries and natural habitats in America and Europe, and although is not currently present in Australia, has been identified as a potential problem that may have widespread effects throughout Australia in the future.

A number of insects also act as pests and parasites. The Webbing Caterpillar causes damage to many young Leptospermum species, using webbing to matt the leaves together and deposit droppings inside. Scale insects can suck the sap from stems and leaves and secrete a substance that causes sooty mould to grow, blackening the foliage.

=== Propagation and cultivation ===
Leptospermum lanigerum is an adaptable species that can tolerate most soils and aspects. Plants are often propagated from seedlings or cuttings and sold in nurseries for garden use. This species is a popular garden plant, due to its attractive flowers and adaptability. Three main forms are known; a large, spreading or erect shrub to 3 m high and 3 m across, a compact columnar shrub to 3 m high by 1 m wide and a slender tree up to 18 m tall (only in Tasmania).

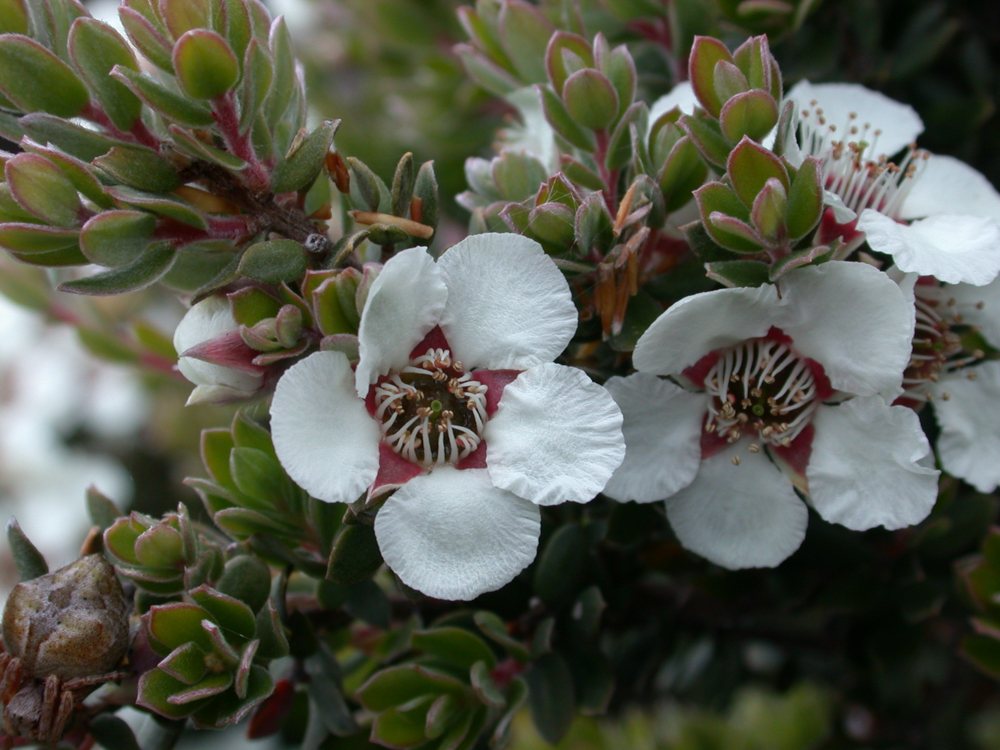
The white, 5-petaled flowers of L. lanigerum.

== History and uses ==
Leptospermum lanigerum was the first Leptospermum species to be brought into cultivation in March 1773. Captain Tobias Furneaux, of HMS Adventure, collected seed from Adventure Bay, Tasmania, as part of Captain James Cook's second visit to the South Seas. This seed was recorded as being in cultivation at the Royal Botanic Gardens, Kew, in 1774.

Indigenous Australians had many uses for L. lanigerum, including the creation of kangaroo spears and double barbed spears from L. lanigerum wood. Young shoots and stems of many Leptospermum species were also used medicinally to treat urinary disorders.

Although not widely drunk today, it is recorded that many Leptospermum species were used as a tea substitute by European settlers. Captain Cook's crew also brewed tea as they believed it would help prevent diseases such as scurvy.
