= List of Australian writers =

List of lists

List of Australian writers by type:

- List of Australian diarists of World War I
- List of Australian diarists of World War I (A-G)
- List of Australian diarists of World War I (H-N)
- List of Australian diarists of World War I (O-Z)
- List of Indigenous Australian writers
- List of Australian novelists
- List of Australian poets
- List of Australian women writers
