= List of Australian diarists of World War I (A-G) =

This is part of the list of Australian diarists of World War I, covering diarists with family names beginning with "A" through to "G". List of H-N, O-Z.

| Name | Rank | Town of Origin | Date of enlistment | Age at enlistment | Theatres | Unit | Notes |
|---|---|---|---|---|---|---|---|
| Aarons, Daniel Sidney | Captain | Donald, VIC | 2 Aug 1915 | 30 | France | 16th Battalion | |
| Abbott, Charles Lydiard Aubrey | | Sydney, NSW | 11 Aug 1914 | 27 | Gallipoli, Palestine, Syria | 12th Light Horse | Served with the Australian Naval and Military Expeditionary Force in the Pacific Islands and with the Twelfth Light Horse in Gallipoli, Palestine and Syria. His diary is a narrative account of the journey from Tel-Aviv_Jaffa to Homs, Syria via Licktera, Lejun, Kuneitra and Damascus, Digitised copy MLMSS 3755. |
| Abbott, Harold Henry | Private | Armadale, VIC | | | Gallipoli | 24th Battalion | Served at Gallipoli from Aug to Nov 1915 |
| Abson, Matthew | Second Lieutenant | Albert Park, VIC | 8 Feb 1915 | | France | 6th Battalion | Served in France from 1916 to 1918 |
| Ackerly, William Arthur Harry | Private | Mansfield, VIC | 20 Jan 1916 | | France | 21st Battalion | |
| Adams, Alfred Sunderland | Private | Albury, NSW | 21 Aug 1914 | 20 | Gallipoli | 5th Infantry Battalion | 'Alf's Gallipoli,' letters from an original Anzac, Private Alfred Sunderland Adams and his Gallipoli Diary 1914 - 1915, copied and annotated by Ollie Japp (née Adams) Original MLMSS 4574 |
| Adams, John | Lieutenant | | | | Gallipoli, France | 54th Battalion | Served at Gallipoli for the entire campaign, from 25 Apr 1915 to 20 Dec 1915, and also fought at the Battle of the Somme. He was awarded the Military Medal and Bar for his service |
| Adams, W. G. | Captain | | | | | 45th Battalion | Awarded a Distinguished Service Order in recognition of his service |
| Adamson, Charles Edward | Sergeant | Maldon, VIC | 20 Jul 1915 | | France | 5th Battalion | Fought at the Battle of the Somme |
| Addis, Henry Hall | Lieutenant | | 26 Jul 1915 | | France | 46th Battalion | |
| Addy, Francis | Corporal | Surry Hills, NSW | 10 Jun 1915 | 26 | Gallipoli, Egypt, France, Belgium | 4th Battalion | ITEM 01 -Francis Addy diary, 9 August 1915 – 31 December 1917 ITEM Digitised copy MLMSS 1607/Item 1 02 - Francis Addy diary, 1 January 1918 – 29 March 1920 Digitised copy MLMSS 1607/Item 2 |
| Adlard, John Evan | Lieutenant | | 3 Feb 1915 | 26 | Gallipoli, France | 1st Field Artillery Brigade | |
| Affleck, Herbert Alexander | Sergeant | Wilcannia, NSW | | | Gallipoli, Western Front | 1st Field Artillery Brigade | Killed in action on 17 Aug 1917 at Ypres |
| Agnew, Ivo Cumberland Fraser | Lieutenant | Oatlands, TAS | 13 Sep 1915 | | France | 17th Battery Australian Field Artillery; 2nd Squadron Australian Flying Corps | Captured in Oct 1917 and held as a German POW until the end of the war |
| Ahern, Timothy Patrick | Lieutenant | Northcote, VIC | 29 May 1915 | | Gallipoli, France | 54th Battalion; HMAT Demosthenes | Killed in action on 19 Jul 1916 |
| Alcock, Thomas Henry | | Waverley, NSW | 7 Oct 1915 | 25 | Egypt, France, Belgium | 3rd Battalion | Served with the 3rd Battalion, 16th Reinforcement in Egypt, 1916, France and Belgium, 1916–1917. Wounded in Nov 1917. ITEM 01 - Thomas Alcock diary, 13 August-2 November 1917, Digitised Copy MLMSS 1609/Item 1 ITEM 02 - Thomas Alcock war narrative, 28 July 1915 – 1917, Digitised Copy MLMSS 1609/Item 2 ITEM 03 - Thomas Alcock war narrative, 1917-February 1919, Digitised Copy MLMSS 1609/Item 3 |
| Alderdice, Arthur Gladstone | Corporal | Beechworth, VIC | 6 Apr 1915 | | Gallipoli, France | 2nd Battalion | Wounded in Jul 1916 and died of his wounds on 15 Aug 1916 |
| Alexander, Roy | | | | | Naval Operations | | Alexander was the wireless operator on the cargo ship Wairuna when she was captured by the German raider Wolf in Jun 1917. He was a POW for the remainder of the war. Diary, May 1917-Nov 1918, sinking of the Wairuna, events during the Wolf's cruise, experiences in various German prison camps, Digitised Copy MLMSS 1610. |
| Allan, Victor Philip | Lieutenant | | | | France, Belgium | Royal Australian Army Service Corps | Served in the Royal Australian Army Service Corps |
| Allen, H. | | | | | France | 3rd Pioneer Battalion | |
| Allen, W. J. | Corporal | | | | | 8th Field Company, Australian Engineers | |
| Allen, William Charles | Sapper | | 7 May 1917 | 17 | Egypt, Palestine | | Diary, April 1917 – 1919, Digitised Copy MLMSS 4500 (MLK 3506/Item 1) Notebook, November 1917 – 1919 S.S. Canberra, 16 Nov. 1917, sightseeing in Jerusalem in Egypt, bombardments and action at Jaffa July-Aug. 1918, and leave in England July 1919 Digitised Copy MLMSS 4500 (MLK 3506/Item 2). Letters, 27 June 1917 – 30 November 1918, Wireless Corps at Moore Park, while on board TSS Canberra, from camps in Egypt, Jericho and from Palestine, July 1918. Digitised Copy MLMSS 4500 (MLK 3506/Item 3). Allen entered his age as 21 on his enlistment form, instead of his actual age (17). |
| Alley, George | Sergeant | Perth, WA | 5 Jul 1915 | 36 | Egypt, France | 11th Battalion | Died in 1919 of illnesses contracted during the war |
| Allison, Arthur Charles | Private | Euroa, VIC | 6 Mar 1916 | | France | 29th Battalion | |
| Allison, Herbert Richard | Private | Richmond, VIC | 24 Oct 1914 | | Gallipoli, Western Front | 58th Battalion | |
| Allsop, Wilfred Joseph | Private | Mosman, NSW | 23 Jul 1915 | 22 | France | 8th Australian Field Ambulance | Stretcher bearer. ITEM 01 Diary, 23 July 1915 – 1 July 1916, Digitised Copy MLMSS 1606/Item 1 ITEM 02 Diary, 2 July -13 September 1916, Digitised Copy MLMSS 1606/Item 2. ITEM 03 Diary, 14 September-22 November 1916, Digitised Copy MLMSS 1606/Item 3 ITEM 04 Diary, 23 November 1916 – 4 January 1917, Digitised Copy MLMSS 1606/Item 4. ITEM 05 Diary, 1 January-31 December 1917, Digitised Copy MLMSS 1606/Item 5 |
| Alwyne, Charles | Private | born in Glasgow Scotland; Manly, NSW | 16 Nov 1916 | 26 | Gallipoli | | Wounded at Gallipoli in May 1915. War diary, April - May 1915, kept during the Gallipoli campaign, 2 April - 3 May 1915 which refers to the death of Lieutenant Colonel G. F. Braund, Digitised Copy MLDOC 1287. |
| Ambler, Llewellyn | Lance Corporal | Collingwood, VIC | 14 Aug 1915 | 29 | Gallipoli, France | 2nd Field Company Engineers | Killed in action on 6 Aug 1918 |
| Anderson, Archibald Simpson | Captain | Cootamundra, NSW | 11 Jul 1917 | | | Australian Army Medical Corps | Served in the Australian Army Medical Corps |
| Anderson, Francis Gerald | Gunner | Bondi, NSW | 15 Sep 1915 | 19 | | 104th Howitzer Battery | |
| Anderson, Frederick Alexander | Private | Mudgeeraba, QLD | | | Gallipoli | 15th Battalion | Died at Gallipoli in May 1915 |
| Anderson, Keith Stirling | Lieutenant | Portland, VIC | 2 Feb 1915 | | Gallipoli, France | 22nd Battalion | |
| Andrews, Albert | Gunner | | | | | 12th Field Artillery Brigade | |
| Andrews, Edward Bertram | Private | Melrose, SA | 8 Sep 1915 | | France | 32nd Battalion | Killed in action in 1916 in France |
| Andrews, Harold Dudley | Lieutenant | Wauchope, NSW | 6 Jul 1915 | 18 | Egypt, France | | Wounded in action in Jul 1916 in France. Awarded the Distinguished Conduct Medal for conspicuous gallantry and devotion to duty |
| Antill, John Macquarie | Major General | Picton, NSW | 17 Oct 1914 | 48 | Gallipoli, Egypt | 3rd Australian Light Horse Brigade; 2nd Infantry Brigade | Commanded the 3rd Australian Light Horse Brigade on service in Gallipoli and Egypt, and the 2nd Infantry Brigade in France and Belgium |
| Archbold, William James | Private | Mackay, QLD | 21 Feb 1916 | | France | 41st Battalion | Killed in action on 26 May 1918 at Villers-Brettoneux. He was 20 years old |
| Archibald, Hixon | Corporal | | | | France | 33rd Battalion | |
| Argall, A. W. | | | | | Egypt, France | | |
| Argyle, Douglas Roy | Private | VIC | 8 May 1915 | | Gallipoli, France | 6th Battalion | Killed in action on 20 Oct 1917 in France |
| Argyle, Stanley Seymour | Lieutenant Colonel | Kyneton, VIC | | | | Australian Army Medical Corps | Served in the Australian Army Medical Corps |
| Armitage, Harold Edwin Salisbury | Captain | Norwood, SA | 24 Mar 1915 | 20 | Gallipoli, France | 10th Battalion; 50th Battalion | Killed in action on 3 Apr 1917 in France |
| Armstrong, Frank Leofric | Lieutenant | Mount Perry, QLD | 29 Apr 1901 | | Gallipoli, France | 15th Infantry Battalion | |
| Armstrong, John Victor | Private | Lismore, NSW | | 18 | France | 39th Battalion | Wounded in action in Jun 1918 in France |
| Armstrong, Robin Henry | Private | Euroa, VIC | 26 Jul 1915 | | Egypt, France, Belgium | 5th Machine Gun Battalion | |
| Armstrong, William John | Private | Carlton, NSW | | | France, Belgium | 24th Battalion | Killed in action in France on 31 Aug 1918 |
| Armytage, C. E. T. | Lieutenant | | | | | 20th Battalion | |
| Arnold, Ralph Irving | Second Lieutenant | North Sydney, NSW | 14 Dec 1914 | | Gallipoli | 15th Battalion | |
| Arnold, Roy Frederick | Sergeant | Paddington | 5 Mar 1915 | 20 | Dardanelles, France | | Awarded the Military Medal in 1918. Served in the Australian Army Medical Corps in World War II |
| Ashmead-Bartlett, Ellis | | | | | Gallipoli | | Sent reports to Australia of the fighting at Gallipoli, which were published in several newspapers |
| Atkinson, Thomas George | | Hobart, TAS | | | Gallipoli, Belgium | | |
| Auchterlonie, George | Sergeant | Narracan, VIC | 13 Jul 1915 | | | 8th Light Horse Regiment | |
| Auld, Patrick Howard | Captain | SA | 4 Nov 1914 | 20 | Gallipoli | 4th Field Ambulance; 50th Battalion | Part of the initial landing at Gallipoli. He was captured at Villers-Bretonneux on 24 Apr 1918 and was a POW; he escaped in Sept and was recaptured |
| Austin, John Gardiner | Major | | | | Gallipoli | | |
| Austin, W. | | | | | | 15th Machine Gun Company | |
| Avenell, Edith Florence | Staff nurse | Gympie, QLD | 14 Jun 1915 | 25 | France, England | Australian Army Nursing Service. 1 Australian General Hospital | Enlisted as a nurse, and joined the No 1 Australian General Hospital unit, working in France and England |
| Axtens, John William | | Annandale, NSW | 16 Aug 1914 | | | 8th Machine Gun Company | Served in the Australian Naval and Military Expeditionary Force |
| Bailey, Ernest | Private | Newcastle, NSW | 2 May 1918 | 37 | | | |
| Bailey, Herbert Austin | Sapper | | | | France | 5th Division; Royal Australian Engineers | |
| Baillie, James | Private | North Sydney | 14 Nov 1914 | 28 | Gallipoli | 13th Battalion | A member of the 13th Battalion, 4th Infantry Brigade A.I.F., Baillie fought in the Gallipoli campaign from the first landing until the troops were withdrawn. Wounded in action, Aug 1916 |
| Baker, Charles A. | | Sydney (Ashfield), NSW | 1 Mar 1917 | 27 | France | 17th Company, Australian Army Service Corps | Driver in the 17th Company, Australian Army Service Corps. Wounded in action in May 1918. |
| Baldwin, Albert Thomas | Corporal | | | | | 40th Battalion | |
| Baldwin, Rupert Thomas James | Sergeant | | | | Western Front | 27th Battalion | |
| Balfour, John | | | | | Gallipoli | | Part of the Gallipoli Mission in 1919 to assess the state of the war graves there |
| Balme, Gerald Archibald | Private | Geelong, VIC | 21 Jun 1916 | 30 | France, Belgium | 29th Battalion | Hospitalised in Mar 1918 after being gassed |
| Barker, James L | Private | | | | France | 55th Battalion | |
| Barnett, Herbert | | | | | France | 50th Battalion | |
| Barr, T. A. C. | | | | | Gallipoli | 4th Battalion | |
| Barr, Thomas A. C. "Jock" | | | | | Gallipoli | 4th Battalion | |
| Barry, Leslie Harold | Driver | Dubbo, NSW | 15 Sep 1915 | 19 | France | 1st Field Company Engineers | Captured in Nov 1916 and subsequently held as a POW |
| Barry, W. | | | | | France | 8th Brigade | Served in the 8th Brigade, later a POW and wounded at the Battle of Fromelles |
| Bartlett, James Stanley Forbes | Second Lieutenant | Brisbane, QLD | | | | 3rd Battalion | Killed in action on 25 Jul 1916 at Pozières |
| Barton, Alan Sinclair Darvall | Major | Bathurst, NSW | 14 Nov 1914 | 28 | | Royal Australian Army Service Corps | Served in the Royal Australian Army Service Corps |
| Barton, Brian Templer | Trooper | Wellington, NSW | 7 Dec 1914 | 27 | Palestine | 6th Light Horse Regiment | Killed in action in Palestine, 3 Dec 1917 |
| Barton, Harold Gilbert | Private | Rainbow, Victoria | 23 Jul 1915 | 24 | Egypt France | 8th Battalion | Diary (29 November 1916 - 24 June 1917) Diary (28 March - 11 October 1916) |
| Barton, John Hampden | Lieutenant | Wellington, NSW | 29 Nov 1915 | 27 | France | 54th Battalion | Jack Barton's diary Recommended for a Military Cross for action on 24 April 1918 |
| Barwick, Archie | Sergeant | Surveyor's Creek, NSW | 24 Aug 1914 | 24 | Egypt, Gallipoli, France, Belgium, England | 1st Battalion | Awarded the Croix de Guerre in Jul 1918 |
| Bassett, William P | Trooper | | | | | 6th Light Horse Regiment | |
| Bastard, Robert Stanley | Private | Adelaide, SA | 19 Aug 1914 | 22 | Gallipoli | 10th Battalion | |
| Bayley, Francis Wilton | Private | | 4 Mar 1916 | 19 | | Camel Transport Corps; Imperial Camel Corps | |
| Bazley, Arthur William | Private | South Yarra, VIC | 5 Oct 1914 | 18 | | 1st Division Headquarters | Served in the 1st Division Headquarters and worked with Charles Bean, official war historian. He later worked at the Australian War Memorial and was part of their project to collect diaries |
| Beach, John Edward Charles | Sapper | | | | France | 4 Division Signals | Served in the 4 Division Signals and was awarded a Military Medal |
| Bean, Charles Edwin | | | | | | | Official war correspondent and author and editor of the Official History of Australia in the War of 1914–1918 |
| Bean, John Willoughby Butler (Jack) | Major | Bathurst, NSW | | | | Australian Army Medical Corps | Served in the Australian Army Medical Corps |
| Bedlington, W. C. | Sergeant | | | | | 4th Machine Gun Battalion | |
| Beeken, Christian | Lieutenant | Bexley | 3 Sep 1914 | 25 | | 3rd Battalion | Killed in action, 6 Aug 1915 |
| Beeston, Joseph Lievesley | Colonel | Newcastle, NSW | 2 Oct 1914 | 55 | Gallipoli | 4th Field Ambulance | In command of the 4th Field Ambulance |
| Bell, Algernon F. | Private | | | | France | 59th Battalion | Wounded at the Battle of Fromelles and died in Jul 1916 |
| Bell, George S. | Lieutenant | | | | | 3rd Squadron AFC | |
| Bell, George W. D. | Private | Port Hedland, WA | 23 Oct 1914 | 21 | France | | Captured at Reincourt near Bullicourt, France, Apr 1917 |
| Bell, James E. | Private | Orange NSW | 20 Aug 1915 | 24 | Egypt, France | | Died as a result of wounds received in action, 28 Jul 1916 |
| Bell, Roy Pinto | | Croydon Park, NSW | 14 Sep 1915 | 21 | France | | Killed in action, 9 Dec 1916 |
| Bellamy, Edward Alan | Corporal | | 20 Jul 1915 | 24 | Egypt, France, Belgium | 14th Field Artillery Brigade | Died in 1917 |
| Bendrey, William | Private | Uralla, NSW | 17 May 1915 | 23 | Gallipoli, France, Egypt | | |
| Benham, Alfred | | Dubbo, NSW | 16 Oct 1916 | 24 | France | | Munitions worker |
| Benjamin, Ernest Lionel | Lance Sergeant | | | | France | 19th Battalion; 2nd Pioneer Battalion | |
| Bennett, Granville | Private | Crow's Nest, NSW | | 15 | France | 8th Machine Gun Company | |
| Bennett, James | | Manly, NSW | 16 Sep 1914 | 24 | | 6th Light Horse | |
| Benson, Claude C. | Lieutenant | Kogarah, NSW | 6 Jun 1915 | 27 | Germany, France | | Captured on 11 Apr 1917 on the Hindenburg Line near Riencourt, France |
| Berg, Martin Walter | Lance Sergeant | | | | France | Royal Australian Army Service Corps | Served in the Royal Australian Army Service Corps |
| Berg, Wilbert Nugent | Sergeant | Braidwood, NSW | | | Gallipoli, France | 18th Battalion; 61st Battalion | |
| Berriman, R. H. | | | | | | Australian Flying Corps | |
| Berry, Herbert Vincent | | Gladesville, NSW | 26 Jun 1915 | 23 | Egypt, France, Belgium, England | 8th Field Ambulance | Served with the 8th Field Ambulance, Australian Army Medical Corps until he was wounded in Sep 1917 |
| Berry, John James | Corporal | | | | France | 3rd Battalion | Killed in action on 10 Nov 1917 |
| Berthon, E. | Gunner | | | | France | 38th Battery Australian Field Artillery | |
| Bertwistle, Wilfrid Hall | Second Lieutenant | Unley, SA | 2 Mar 1915 | | Gallipoli, France | 27th Battalion; 7th Machine Gun Company | |
| Betheras, Alice Margaret | Staff Nurse | Castlemaine, VIC | 10 Oct 1915 | 28 | Egypt, Cairo | Australian Army Nursing Service | |
| Betteridge, Isaac Henry | Private | Ballarat, VIC | 2 Jan 1917 | | France | 23rd Battalion | |
| Beveridge, G. | | | | | | 22nd Battalion | |
| Beveridge, Roy Stuart | Lance Sergeant | | | | | 20th Battalion | |
| Bevington, William A. | | | | | | 2nd Pioneer Battalion | |
| Biggen, Edgar Henry | Corporal | Collingwood, VIC | 22 Feb 1916 | | Belgium | | Killed in action on 24 Feb 1918 |
| Billings, H. | | | | | Gallipoli | 1st Signal Troop, Australian Engineers, 1st Light Horse Brigade | Served with the 1st Signal Troop, Australian Engineers, 1st Light Horse Brigade |
| Binnie, Kenneth | Lieutenant | Quirindi, NSW | 6 Jan 1916 | 22 | France | 26th Battery | Served in the 26th Battery of the 3rd Australian Division |
| Birkbeck, Gordon T. | Private | Croydon, NSW | 22 Jun 1915 | 23 | Gallipoli, Egypt and Palestine | | |
| Black, Archie Lindesay | Lieutenant | Mackay, QLD | 23 Nov 1915 | 28 | Passchendale, Belgium and France | 14th Field Artillery Brigade | Seriously injured at Passchendale in October 1917. Returned to Australia. Diaries have been digitised |
| Blackburn, Clive | Sergeant | | 18 Feb 1916 | | | 39th Battalion | |
| Blake, Frank | Private | Petersham, NSW | 5 Jul 1916 | 27 | Egypt and Palestine | Australian Camel Brigade Field Ambulance | Served in the Australian Camel Brigade Field Ambulance and subsequently in the Sanitary Inspectors Section, ANZAC Mounted Division |
| Blandford, Frederick Rodford | Private | Newcastle, NSW | 15 Jun 1916 | | | 53rd Battalion | Killed in action on 26 Sep 1917 at Polygon Wood |
| Blashki, Roy Hector | | | | | | 53rd Battery Australian Field Artillery | |
| Bloch, Henry Scharrer (Harry) | Gunner | Deloraine, TAS | | | | 6th Field Artillery Brigade | |
| Blundell, Richard | | Liverpool, England | 14 Dec 1914 | 25 | France, Egypt | Australian Field Artillery; 101st Battalion | Served with the Australian Field Artillery and subsequently the 101st Battalion |
| Blyth, Kenneth | Driver | | | | | 31st Battery Australian Field Artillery | |
| Boal, A. C. | Private | | | | | 5th Pioneer Battalion | |
| Bolger, Joseph Michael | | Ingleburn NSW | 19 Aug 1915 | 28 | | 7th Regiment Australian Light Horse | |
| Booley, George | Lance Corporal | VIC | | | Gallipoli, Western Front | 5th Battalion | |
| Booth, John | Private | Balmain, NSW | 16 Mar 1915 | 28 | Gallipoli, Egypt, France | 20th Battalion | Served with the 20th Battalion and was killed in action, Oct 1917. |
| Booth, Mary | | | | | | | Doctor Booth founded the Women's Club in 1901, the Soldiers' Club in 1915, the Centre for Soldiers' Wives and Mothers in 1915 and the Anzac Fellowship of Women in 1921 |
| Borbidge, William R. | | | | | | | |
| Bostock, James Dundee | Private | Dulacca, QLD | 2 Nov 1914 | 18 | Gallipoli | 9th Battalion | Second man to arrive on shore at the Gallipoli landing |
| Bosward, Charles Frederick Richmond | Lance Sergeant | Sydney, NSW | | | Gallipoli | 4th Battalion | Died at Gallipoli in Aug 1915 |
| Boulton, Lachlan Roy | Corporal | Quirindi, NSW | | | France | 33rd Battalion | Killed in action on 48 Jul 1917 |
| Bourke, John | Lieutenant | VIC | | | | 8th Battalion | |
| Bowen, James F. | Sapper | | | | | 5th Division | |
| Bowkett, Leonard Andrew | Sapper | Corowa, NSW | | | | 10th Field Company | |
| Bowler, William | Private | Bondi, NSW | 5 Mar 1916 | 28 | | 1st Field Ambulance | Served in the Army Medical Corps and 1st Field Ambulance |
| Bowman, Vincent Ambrose | Private | NSW | | | France | 9th Battalion | |
| Bradbury, William | Lance Corporal | Crookwell, NSW | 28 Jan 1915 | 21 | Gallipoli and Egypt | 12th Australian Light Horse Regiment | Killed in action on 31 Oct 1917 |
| Bradshaw, Edward Charles | Sapper | | | | | | Served in the Australian Mounted Divisions |
| Bradshaw, William Edward | Sapper | | | | | 15th Battalion | |
| Bray, Alfred Ernest Cornelius | Sergeant | Hurstville, NSW | 23 Aug 1915 | 18 | Egypt, France | 18th Battalion | Served with the 18th Battalion, 7th Reinforcement |
| Brayne, Cyril Turner | Private | | | | Gallipoli, France, Belgium | 19th Battalion; 2nd Pioneer Battalion | |
| Brett, Robert Cyril Palmer | Sergeant | Toowoomba, QLD | 27 Feb 1915 | 23 | Gallipoli, France | 25th Battalion | |
| Brew, Thomas | | | | | Gallipoli, France | 2nd Battalion | Died in 1917 |
| Brewer, Francis | | Kangaroo Point, QLD | 8 Jan 1917 | 33 | France | | |
| Brewer, Hector | Lieutenant | Newtown | 24 Aug 1914 | 19 | Alexandria, Gallipoli, France, Belgium | 2nd Battalion; 54th Battalion | Served in the H. Company, 2nd Battalion and later the 54th Battalion, 14th Brigade |
| Brewer, Roy Thomas | Private | Gunning, NSW | | | France | 19th Battalion | Awarded the Military Medal in 1918 |
| Brierley, Norman Charles | Private | Brisbane | 17 Dec 1917 | 21 | France | | |
| Brissenden, Edwin M | Lieutenant Colonel | | | | France | 34th Battalion | Served in the 34th Battalion, 3rd Division |
| Britton, Charles | Private | North Sydney, NSW | 8 Sep 1916 | 37 | Belgium, France | 35th Battalion | Served in the 35th Battalion, 7th Reinforcement |
| Brock, Denis Patrick | | | 26 Feb 1916 | | France | 39th Battalion | Died of wounds received on 1 May 1917 |
| Brook, William James Heathcote | Sapper | Orange, NSW | | | | 1st Tunnelling Company | Killed in action on 10 Nov 1916 |
| Brooker, Stan | Corporal | | | | Gallipoli, Egypt, France | 21st Battalion | |
| Brooks, David Thomas | Private | Yarcowie, SA | | | | 8th Field Ambulance | |
| Brooks, John | Private | Adelaide, SA | 20 Mar 1916 | 24 | France and Belgium | 50th Battalion | Served in the 50th Battalion, 6th Reinforcement until wounded on 24 Apr 1918 |
| Brown, Allan Dunn | Private | Annandale, NSW | 11 Sep 1915 | 20 | France, Belgium | 3rd Battalion | Served with D. Company, 3rd Battalion, 1st Brigade until he was wounded in Aug 1916, and subsequently returned to Australia and discharged from the army in Nov 1917 |
| Brown, Edwin Albert Ernest | Driver | Sydney, NSW | | | Gallipoli, Palestine | 1st Light Horse Regiment; 1st Signal Squadron | |
| Brown, Garland Kent | | | | | Gallipoli | 3rd Field Ambulance | |
| Brown, Joseph Bruce Landseer (Joe) | | NSW | | | | | Served in the Royal Australian Navy on HMAS Australia |
| Bruce, Oswald | | | | | France | 4th Field Company | |
| Bryan, Edward Patrick | | South Melbourne, VIC | 17 Aug 1914 | 16 | Gallipoli, France | 6th Battalion | Signaller in the 6th Battalion, C Company |
| Bryant, Claude Richard Henry | Lieutenant | | | | Gallipoli | 4th Division; 4th Light Horse Brigade | |
| Bryant, Leonard Clyde | Lance Corporal | | | | France | 2nd Field Ambulance | Awarded the Military Medal on 22 Aug 1918 for bravery |
| Buchanan, George M. | | | | | | 15th Field Ambulance | |
| Buchanan, Keith | Gunner | | | | | 39th Battery Australian Field Artillery | |
| Buesst, Tristan Noel Marand | Lieutenant | | | | France | | |
| Bull, Joseph | | | | | Western Front | Australian Flying Corps | |
| Bullin, David | | | | | France | | |
| Bungardy, Frank | | | | | | | A German born Australian resident, he was interned at Torrens Island Concentration Camp and Holdsworthy Internment camp |
| Burch, Isaac John | | | | | | | Served on the HMAT Wandilla |
| Burgess, Joseph George | Lance Corporal | Redfern, NSW, born St Arnaud VIC | 8 Sep 1914 | 27 | Gallipoli, Egypt and Palestine | 6th Light Horse Regiment | |
| Burgis, Frederick Carrington | Private | born Liverpool, 1885; Kogarah, NSW | 16 Apr 1915 | 30 | Egypt, Gallipoli | 20th Battalion | Served in the 20th Battalion, D Company |
| Burke, Eric Keast | | | | | | 1st Australian Wireless Squadron | |
| Burns, A. | | | | | Gallipoli, France | 4th Division | |
| Burrell, William | Private | Camperdown, NSW | 4 Aug 1915 | 22 | France and Belgium | 17th Battalion | Stretcher bearer in the B. Company 17th Battalion, 5th Infantry Brigade, until he was wounded in Sep 1917. He was awarded the Military Medal for bravery in the field. After recovering from his wounds, he served in the 4th Australian B.G.R.O. Company until the end of the war. |
| Burrett, Athol Frederick | Major | NSW | | | France | 3rd Battalion | |
| Burrowes, Arthur John | | Rooty Hill | 26 Mar 1917 | 39 | France | 18th Battalion | Served in the 18th Battalion, 21st Reinforcement until he was wounded on 8 Aug 1918 |
| Burstal, John Acheson | | Rose Bay, NSW | 26 Apr 1918 | 19 | England | | |
| Burton, Colin John Combe | Sapper | | | | France, Belgium | 10th Field Company; 5th Pioneer Battalion | |
| Burtt, Thomas Alfred | Private | Mascot, NSW | | | France | 33rd Battalion | Died on 3 Apr 1918 of wounds |
| Butler, John Herbert | Lieutenant | Bondi | 19 Aug 1914 | 20 | Egypt | | Served in the Australian Flying Corps, and worked in commercial aviation after the War |
| Byard, Frank Liddell | Gunner | Hahndorf, SA | | | Belgium, France | 108th Howitzer Battery; 8th Field Artillery Brigade | |
| Cahill, Frederick Joseph | | Lismore, NSW | | | France | 36th Battalion | |
| Calder, Norman Keith 'Tusky' | Commander | Geelong, VIC | | | | Royal Australian Navy | Captain of HMAS Bungaree |
| Caldwell, Robert Douglas | | | 19 Feb 1917 | 19 | | 2nd Battalion | Served in the 2nd Battalion, 25th Reinforcement |
| Callinan, William | Private | | 19 May 1915 | | France | 6th Field Ambulance | Killed in action on 5 Aug 1916 |
| Callow, Auburn Douglas | Lieutenant | | 8 Sep 1914 | | Egypt, Gallipoli, Middle East | 8th Light Horse Regiment | |
| Cameron, Hugh Nesbitt | Gunner | Yeronga, QLD | 25 Oct 1915 | 22 | France | 9th Field Artillery Brigade, 34th Battery | Diary has been digitised. |
| Cameron, James | | | | | Gallipoli | 8th Light Horse Regiment | Wounded at Gallipoli |
| Cameron, Kenneth Ewen | Private | Brisbane, QLD | 11 Jan 1916 | 22 | Middle East | No1 Park Wireless Signal Troop | |
| Cameron, William | Second Lieutenant | Rushworth, VIC | | | Gallipoli | 9th Light Horse Regiment | |
| Campbell, Clarence Boswell | Corporal | | 10 Jul 1917 | | | 10th Company, Australian Army Service Corps | |
| Campbell, Hugh Andrew Geraldton | Lieutenant | Enoggera, QLD | 29 Feb 1916 | 30 | England, France | 11th Field Company Engineers | Diary has been digitised. |
| Campbell, James | Sapper | | | | Gallipoli | 1st Australian Imperial Force | |
| Camroux, W. H. | Lance Corporal | Rozelle, NSW | 20 Aug 1915 | 22 | France | 17th Battalion | Served in the A. Company, 17th Battalion, 6th Reinforcement. He was wounded on 27 Aug 1918 and gassed on 5 Oct 1918 |
| Canning, Bertram | Sergeant | | 20 Aug 1914 | | | 4th Light Horse Regiment | |
| Cantwell, Daryl | Sergeant | | 23 Nov 1915 | 23 | France | 52nd Battalion | |
| Cardwell, Claude Edward | Gunner | South Yarra, VIC | 5 Mar 1917 | 19 | France | 8th Field Artillery Brigade | Served in the 1st Stationary Hospital |
| Carleton, Charles Richard | Lieutenant | | 5 Aug 1915 | | | 6th Field Company; 7th Field Company; Royal Australian Engineers | Wounded in Oct 1917 |
| Carnell, Reginald Wilfred | Sapper | | | | Gallipoli | 3rd Field Company | Served at Gallipoli from Apr to Nov 1915 |
| Carr, H. J. | | | | | | 8th Field Artillery Brigade | |
| Carr, Octavius Jocelyn | Private | | | | Gallipoli, Western Front | 1st Field Ambulance; 4th Field Ambulance | |
| Carr, William Chambers Gilbert | Private | VIC | | | France | 58th Battalion | Died of wounds on 31 Jul 1916 |
| Carter, Frank | Gunner | | | | Western Front | 15th Battery Australian Field Artillery | |
| Carter, Herbert Gordon | Lieutenant Colonel | Sydney, NSW | | | Gallipoli, France | 1st Battalion; 5th Pioneer Battalion | |
| Carter, J. G. | Sergeant | | | | Western Front | 34th Battalion | |
| Carter, John V. | Lieutenant | | | | France | Trench mortar units | |
| Carter, Otway V. | | | | | Middle East | 29th Battalion | Captured and a German POW |
| Caust, Arnold F. H. | | | | | France | 10th Battalion | |
| Cavalier, Ronald Ernest | Sergeant | Armadale, VIC | 18 Sep 1914 | 20 | Gallipoli | Royal Australian Artillery, 1st Division | |
| Cave, Harrie Joseph | Lance Corporal | Birchgrove, NSW | 25 Jul 1915 | 23 | Egypt, France and Belgium | 1st Battalion | Served in the 1st Battalion, 1st Infantry Brigade. He was wounded in action on 23 Oct 1916 |
| Chambers, Philip Arthur | Major | Wellington, NSW | 16 Mar1915 | 38 | Egypt, Palestine | 12th Light Horse Regiment | |
| Champion, Benjamin William | Lieutenant | Stanmore, NSW | 11 May 1915 | 18 | Egypt, Gallipoli, France | 1st Battalion | |
| Chandler, Horace Arthur | Driver | | 8 Mar 1915 | | France, Belgium | 8th Field Artillery Brigade | Served as a Driver with the 8th Field Artillery Brigade |
| Chapman, Clement Lorne | Captain | | 26 Mar 1915 | | Gallipoli | Royal Australian Army Medical Corps | |
| Chapman, John Joseph | Lieutenant | Ballarat, VIC | 15 Sep 1914 | | Gallipoli, France | 9th Battalion | |
| Chapman, Reginald K. N. | | | | | France, Belgium | 24th Battalion; 60th Battalion; 57th Battalion | Served in the 6th Reinforcements, 24th Battalion, the 60th Battalion and the 57th Battalion. |
| Chester, Richard H. | | | | | | Australian Flying Corps | |
| Chester, Willie Neville Majoribank | Private | | 28 Aug 1915 | | France, Belgium | 2nd Field Ambulance, Australian Army Medical Corps | |
| Choat, Wesley | Private | Clarence Park, SA | 12 Jul 1915 | 20 | France, Germany | | Enlisted with his brothers Archibald and Raymond on 12 Jul 1915. His brothers were both killed in action at Fromelles on 20 Jul 1916, and Wesley was taken prisoner. He escaped in Oct 1917 and walked through Holland to escape back to England. The journey took him five weeks. |
| Churches, Herbert Eric | Private | | | | France | 17th Battalion | |
| Churchus, Walter | | Melbourne, VIC | | | | 7th Field Artillery Brigade | |
| Cicognani, Harry | Private | Glebe, NSW | 24 Aug 1914 | 26 | Egypt France and Gallipoli | 1st Field Ambulance | Captured in Aug 1916 |
| Claridge, Walter George Molyneux | Captain | Armadale, WA | | | France | 22nd Battalion; 8th Battalion | |
| Clarke, Eric Roy | Staff Sergeant | Fairfield, QLD | 2 Sep 1915 | 22 | Egypt | | Served in the Australian Army Service Corps, 4th Divisional Train. He was wounded on 23 Nov 1916 |
| Clarke, Frederick Montague | Private | Hobart, TAS | 9 Oct 1914 | 27 | Gallipoli, France | 11th Field Ambulance | |
| Clarke, J. H. S. | Sapper | | | | | Royal Engineers | |
| Clayden, Walter "Wally" James | | | | | | 23rd Battalion | |
| Cleary, Thomas Joseph | Private | Annandale, NSW | 30 Sep 1918 | 39 | Egypt, France, Belgium | 2nd Pioneer Battalion; 17th Battalion | |
| Clements, Callan | | | | | France | 54th Battalion | Served in the 54th Battalion, 5th Division |
| Clifford, James Reynolds 'Nat' | | Hay, NSW | | | | HMAS Encounter | Served on HMAS Encounter and HMAS Sydney |
| Clohessy, Joseph | | | | | Gallipoli, France | 11th Battalion | Hospitalised due to shell shock and discharged on 24 Oct 1916, he re-enlisted on 20 Apr 1917 and served in France. Clohessy was wounded in action on 1 Jul 1918 |
| Cocks, Verner | Private | Randwick, NSW | 25 Aug 1915 | 21 | France, Belgium | 9th Field Ambulance | Served in the 6th Australian Army Medical Corps; Field Ambulance 9, Section A. He was wounded in action on 20 Oct 1917 |
| Coe, Henry John Frederick | Major | | | | Gallipoli, France | 12th Field Artillery Brigade | |
| Coen, Francis | Captain | Yass, NSW | | | Gallipoli, Egypt and France | 18th Battalion; 19th Battalion | Killed in action at Pozières on 28 Jul 1916. He was 32 years old |
| Cohen, Benjamin Alfred | Sergeant | Midland Junction, WA | 29 Sep 1916 | 37 | France, Belgium | | Served in the Australian Broad Gauge Operating Company |
| Coleman, Edward Maurice | Gunner | VIC | | | Egypt, Gallipoli | 2nd Field Artillery Brigade | |
| Colley-Priest, Langford | Private | Neutral Bay NSW | 18 May 1915 | 25 | France | 8th Field Ambulance | Served in the 8th Field Ambulance, Section A |
| Collins, Timothy James | Lieutenant | Melbourne, VIC | 24 Jan 1916 | 26 | France | 39th Battalion | |
| Compton, Albert Richmond | Sergeant | Leichhardt | 15 Feb 1915 | 20 | Gallipoli, France | 13th Battalion | Served in the 13th Battalion, 4th Reinforcement. He was a POW from 11 Apr 1917 until he was repatriated in Dec 1918 |
| Conigrave, Harry Stanley | Private | Adelaide, SA | 20 Aug 1914 | 22 | Gallipoli | 3rd Light Horse Regiment | |
| Conn, Robert Colin | Private | Red Hill, QLD | 7 Mar 1916 | 23 | France | Divisional Cyclist Company 4, Reinforcement 2 | Died in combat 30 March 1918. Diary has been digitised |
| Connelly, John Norman | Sergeant | | | | | 5th Machine Gun Company | |
| Cook, Elsie Shepperd | Sister | Darlinghurst, NSW | 19 Oct 1914 | 24 | Egypt, France | Australian Army Nursing Services | |
| Cook, Wallace Gordon | Sapper | Merewether, NSW | 22 Jan 1916 | | France | 4th Signal Regiment | |
| Cooper, Gordon Colin | Lance Corporal | Inverell, NSW | 27 Aug 1914 | 21 | Gallipoli, Palestine | 1st Australian Light Horse Anzac Mounted Division | Served in the Machine Gun Section, 1st Australian Light Horse Anzac Mounted Division |
| Cope, John Lelean | Captain (Chaplain 4th Class) | Melbourne, VIC | 29 Sep 1915 | 48 | Gallipoli | | Chaplain for the 14th Battalion |
| Copp, Charles Henry | Lieutenant | Melbourne, VIC | 17 Aug 1914 | | Gallipoli | 2nd Squadron AFC; 46th Battalion; 5th Battalion | |
| Corbin, John | Lieutenant Colonel | | | | Gallipoli, France | | Served at the 1st Casualty Clearing Station, 1st Stationary Hospital, 2nd Casualty Clearing Station, and 3rd Casualty Clearing Station |
| Corbould, William Westman | Gunner | Sydney, NSW | | | France | 4th Division | |
| Corder, Fredrick T | | | | | Gallipoli, France | 7th Battery Australian Field Artillery; 1st Light Horse Brigade | |
| Corliss, Lloyd Alexander | Trooper | Boggabri, NSW | 5 Jan 1915 | | Gallipoli, Sinai, Palestine | 1st Australian Light Horse | Died on 17 Nov 1917 of wounds |
| Cormack, Raymond Fairhurst | Private | | | | France | 12th Field Ambulance | |
| Cotton, Malcolm John Bernard | Captain | East Maitland, NSW | 18 Aug 1914 | 19 | Gallipoli, Egypt, France | 2nd Battalion | Died at Pozières in Jul 1916 |
| Coulter, Jason Leslie Boyd | Sergeant | Ballarat, VIC | 27 Aug 1914 | 36 | Egypt, Gallipoli | 8th Battalion | Died on 10 Aug 1915 of wounds received at Gallipoli |
| Coutts, Donald Dunbar | Major | Mysia, VIC | 18 Nov 1916 | 26 | France | 6th Field Ambulance | |
| Cowan, S. O. | | | | | | 1st Stationary Hospital | |
| Cox, Charles Frederick | Brigadier General | Pennant Hills, NSW | 15 Sep 1915 | 51 | Gallipoli, Egypt, Palestine, Syria | 1st Light Horse Brigade; 6th Light Horse Regiment | Commanding Officer of the 1st Light Horse Brigade |
| Cox, Fergus Robert | Private | Jimbour, QLD | 10 Aug 1915 | 20 | | Australian Flying Corps | Served as an air mechanic with the Australian Flying Corps |
| Cox, George S. | | | | | Gallipoli | 4th Field Ambulance | |
| Cox, Rudolph William | Corporal | Salisbury SA | 6 Sep 1915 | 19 | Egypt, France, Belgium | 3rd Field Company Engineers | Served as a sapper in the Australian Imperial Forces in No. 2 Section, 3rd Field Company Engineers, Reinforcement 15 |
| Cozens, Thomas E. | Lieutenant | Bobinawarrah, VIC | 3 Feb 1915 | 22 | Gallipoli, France | 21st Battalion | |
| Crane, Walter J. | | | | | France | 20th Battalion | |
| Craven, Norman Thomas John | Private | Balmain, NSW | 27 Jun 1915 | | Gallipoli, France | 20th Battalion | |
| Crawford, Andrew | Major | VIC | | | | 8th Light Horse Regiment | |
| Creedon, Daniel Bartholemew | Private | Maryborough, QLD | 19 Aug 1914 | | | 9th Battalion | Captured on 28 Jun 1915 at Gallipoli and held as a Turkish POW. He died on 27 Feb 1917 |
| Crisp, Ralph Harry | Captain | Ballarat, VIC | 7 May 1917 | 22 | | 49th Battalion | |
| Crisp, Stanley | Lance Corporal | | | | | 7th Light Trench Mortar Battery | |
| Croft, John Hector | Private | Mittagong, NSW | 3 Nov 1914 | 23 | Gallipoli, France | 3rd Battalion | Wounded at Gallipoli on 25 Apr 1915. He later served in France and died on 27 Jul 1916 of wounds |
| Croll, David Gifford | Colonel | Brisbane, Qld | 19 Oct 1914 | | | 2nd Light Horse Field Ambulance and later Assistant-Director of Medical Services for the Anzac Mounted Division | |
| Crooks, Thomas Ray | Lieutenant | New Lambton, NSW | 3 Dec 1914 | 30 | Egypt, Dardanelles, France and Belgium | | Wounded in action in France on 6 Aug 1916. He was awarded the Military Cross for conspicuous gallantry and devotion to duty in Mar 1917. |
| Cross, Victor | | | | | France | 49th Battalion | |
| Cubis, Arthur J. | Private | | | | Egypt, France | 18th Battalion | |
| Cull, William Ambrose | Captain | Hamilton, Vict | 7 May 1915 | 20 | Gallipoli, Western Front | 22nd Battalion; 23rd Battalion | Served in the 22nd and 23rd Battalions, 6th Infantry Brigade. He was wounded in action at Gallipoli on 6 Nov 1915. After being reported wounded and missing on 26 Feb 1917, he was reported as a POW on 13 May 1917. His memoir was published in 1919. |
| Cumming, Gordon | | TAS | | | | 3rd Australian General Hospital | |
| Cunningham, Alexander Jackson | Captain | Geelong, VIC | 11 Sep 1914 | 29 | | | Served with the Royal Australian Army Service Corps and the Royal Australian Engineers |
| Cunningham, Charles S. | | | | | | Postal units | |
| Cunningham, Kenneth Stewart | Lieutenant | Sebastopol, VIC | 6 Aug 1915 | 25 | | 5th Field Ambulance | |
| Cuthbert, Noel Millar | Captain | | | | Egypt, France | 2nd Battalion | |
| Dadswell, Henry William | Sapper | | 16 Sep 1915 | | Egypt, France, Belgium | 5th Divisional Signal Company | Awarded the Military Medal |
| Dains, James William | Chaplain | Uralla, NSW | 1 Sep 1915 | 33 | | | Reverend Dains was part of the 35th Battalion of the 9th Brigade, and was the Methodist chaplain. |
| Dakin, Clarence Herbert | Lieutenant | North Sydney, NSW | Mar 1915 | 20 | Gallipoli, France | 5th Machine Gun Company | Killed in action on 15 Apr 1917 |
| Daniels, Harry | Private | | | | Gallipoli | 16th Battalion | |
| Darby, Leonard | | | | | | | Darby was the surgeon on board HMAS Sydney during the Battle of Cocos. |
| Darchy, Thomas | Corporal | Rowena, NSW | 18 Jan 1917 | 36 | France | 1st Pioneer Battalion | Served in the 1st Pioneer Battalion, 11th Reinforcement |
| Dark, Eric | | | | | | 9th Field Ambulance | |
| Davies, Ernest David | | Richmond, VIC | 13 Jul 1915 | | France, Belgium | 22nd Battalion; 7th Battalion | |
| Davies, George Henry | Private | | | | Western Front | 36th Battalion | Killed in action on 12 Jul 1917 |
| Davies, Herbert Arthur | Sergeant | | 8 Sep 1916 | | | 2nd Division Supply Column | |
| Davies, Lancelot Rawes | Corporal | Leichhardt, NSW | 30 Aug 1915 | 24 | | 13th Battalion | Captured on 11 Apr 1917 and a German POW |
| Davis, Edgar Atheling | Private | | 9 Nov 1917 | | Egypt, Gallipoli, France | 2nd Battalion | |
| Davis, George Edward | | | | | Gallipoli, France | | Contracted typhoid fever at Gallipoli and sent to England for his convalescence |
| Davis, Henry S. | Captain | | | | France | 46th Battalion | Died at Bullecourt in Apr 1917 |
| Davis, Herbert Theodore | Gunner | Highett, VIC | 31 May 1915 | | France, Belgium | 4th Field Artillery Brigade | |
| Dawkins, Charles Stanley | Captain | Warrnambool, VIC | | | France | 51st Battalion | Killed in action on 3 Sep 1916 near Pozières aged 24 |
| Day, Donald Fowler | Private | | | | | | Served in the Royal Australian Army Medical Corps and Australian Flying Corps |
| Day, Kenneth Sydney | Gunner | | | | Egypt, France | 4th Field Artillery Brigade | Wounded at the Battle of Bullecourt in May 1917 |
| De Mouncy, Ernest | Sapper | Fremantle, WA | 26 Jan 1917 | 43 | France, Belgium | 4th Division Signallers | Served in the 4th Division Signallers, 16th Reinforcements |
| Deitz, Charlie Reilly | Sergeant | Temora, NSW | | | France | 1st Battalion | |
| Delahunty, John Patrick | Sapper | Essendon, VIC | | | France | 2nd Tunnelling Company | |
| Delamore, Adrian Wilmot | Sergeant | | | | Gallipoli | | |
| Denny, William Joseph | Captain | South Terrace, SA | 17 Aug 1915 | 42 | France | | Fought in the Battle of Mont Saint-Quentin |
| Dewhurst, Stanley | | | 14 Feb 1916 | 22 | France | | Served in the Howitzer Brigade 116 and 3rd Army Field Artillery Brigade |
| Dick, Arthur Morrison | Sergeant | | | | France, Belgium | 17th Battalion; 5th Machine Gun Company | |
| Dicker, Walter C. | | | | | France | 2nd Machine Gunth Battalion | |
| Dickinson, Herbert Spencer | Captain | Childers, VIC | | | Gallipoli, France | 57th Battalion | Killed in action near Ypres on 26 Sep 1917 aged 25 |
| Dickinson, Vincent Robert | Lieutenant | | | | | 7th Battalion | Battalion Intelligence Officer from 20 Jan 1917 onwards |
| Dodd, Charles Banwell | Private | | | | Sinai, Palestine | | |
| Doddemeade, Eric V. | Lieutenant | | | | France | 12th Field Artillery Brigade | |
| Donald, W. H. | Colonel | | | | | | Served in the Royal Australian Army Medical Corps |
| Donaldson, Alec | Captain | | | | | | Served on the S.S. Matunga when it was captured by the S.M.S. Wolf |
| Donkin, Reginald Lyons | Private | Brisbane, QLD | | | Gallipoli | 1st Battalion | Died in Dec 1915 |
| Donnell, Anne | Staff nurse | Adelaide, SA | 20 May 1915 | 39 | Egypt, France | The 3rd Australian General Hospital | Australian Army Nursing Service |
| Douglas, Gerald J. | Lieutenant | | | | France | 59th Battalion | |
| Douglas, Lennox Ross Owen | | Orange, NSW | 9 Feb 1915 | 20 | | 19th Battalion | |
| Douglass, Arthur | Captain | | | | | Royal Australian Army Medical Corps | |
| Dowell, George Slater | Sapper | Adelaide, SA | | | | 1st Field Company | Killed in action in 1918 |
| Dowell, James Wilson | Private | Croydon, NSW | | | France | 45th Battalion | |
| Downes, Rupert Major | Major General | | | | Gallipoli, France, Palestine | Royal Australian Army Medical Corps | |
| Doyle, Alec Broughton | | Scone, NSW | | | | | Served as Engineer Officer on HMAS Parramatta |
| Doyle, Kathleen Lillie | Sister | Scone, NSW | 15 May 1915 | 36 | Egypt | Australian Army Nursing Service. 3rd Australian General Hospital | |
| Drane, T. E. | | Forbes, NSW | | | Gallipoli | | Part of the first landing at Gallipoli on 25 Apr 1915. He was wounded in action on 1 May 1915 |
| Drummond, Robert James | | Windsor, VIC | 11 Sep 1916 | 30 | England, France, Belgium | 5th Australian Motor Transport Company; 21st Battalion | Served in the 5th Australian Motor Transport Company and the 21st Battalion, 19th Reinforcement |
| Duckmanton, Sydney 'Sid' James | Lieutenant | Wycheproof, VIC | | | Egypt, France | 15th Field Company; 5th Field Company; 60th Battalion | |
| Dunlop, Athol Cedric | Private | | | | France | 1st Light Trench Mortar Battery; 4th Battalion; 56th Battalion | Wounded at Pozières |
| Dunlop, Leslie | Captain | Ipswich, QLD | 13 Oct 1915 | 19 | Gallipoli | 1st Field Ambulance | Served in the 1st Field Ambulance, 1st Australian Division, until he was wounded in action on 9 Aug 1915 |
| Dunlop, William Archibald | Major | | | | France | 9th Brigade | |
| Dutton, Albert Arthur | Corporal | | | | | 29th Battalion | |
| Dyer, William | | Newcastle, NSW | | | | | |
| Easy, Albert | Sapper | Liverpool, NSW | | | | 12th Field Company; 25th Battalion | Awarded the Military Medal in 1917. John William Stead, who served with Easy, gave Easy his diary in Apr 1916. Easy then used it from May 1916 onwards. |
| Edgerton, Eric Henry Drummond | Lieutenant | Moonee Ponds, VIC | 4 Apr 1915 | | Gallipoli, France | 24th Battalion | Awarded the Military Medal and Bar |
| Edmonds, Adrian Henry | Lance Corporal | Sydney, NSW | 21 Apr 1915 | 23 | Gallipoli, Western Front | 3rd Divisional Signals | |
| Edmonds, Frederick Leonard | | Harris Park, NSW | 13 Sep 1915 | 25 | Egypt, Sinai | 7th Field Company Engineers | Served in the 7th Field Company Engineers in 1915. He was subsequently assigned to work with Captain Frank Hurley, official war photographer |
| Edmondson, George Edward | Sergeant | Redfern, NSW | 15 Jan 1916 | 23 | France, Belgium | | Served as a gunner in the 25th Battery, 7th Field Artillery Brigade |
| Edwards, Alfred, Henry | Corporal | Kogarah, NSW | 1 Nov 1915 | 19 | France | 17th Battalion | Wounded in action on 31 Aug 1918 |
| Edwards, Cecil Francis | | | | | Gallipoli, France | 2nd Battery Australian Field Artillery | |
| Edwards, Gordon Thomas | | Orange Dale, Stuart Town, NSW | 28 Dec 1915 | 18 | Egypt, France, Belgium | 54th Battalion | Served in the C Company, 54th Battalion. He was wounded in action in Apr 1918 |
| Edwards, Richard Asaph | | | | | Gallipoli | 4th Battalion | |
| Edwards, William Henry | Private | | | | | 44th Battalion | |
| Egan, C. | Captain | | | | | SS Cycle | |
| Ellis, Alfred William Leslie | Captain | | | | | 4th Squadron | Commanding officer of the 4th Squadron, Australian Flying Corps. |
| Elvin, L. R. | Sergeant | | | | France | 1st Battalion | Killed in action on 5 May 1917 at Bullecourt |
| Emery, Eric Harold | Sergeant | Marrickville, NSW | 1 Sep 1915 | | | 5th Pioneer Battalion | |
| Evans, Maurice Caine | Corporal | Kyogle, NSW | 24 Aug 1914 | 19 | Egypt and Palestine | 1st Light Horse Field Ambulance | |
| Everard, W. Innes | Corporal | | | | | 2nd Machine Gunth Battalion | Killed in action in 1918 |
| Fairley, James Fairburn | Captain | Wodonga, VIC | 16 Aug 1914 | 25 | | Royal Army Medical Corps | |
| Fairweather, Francis Edward | Captain | Moonee Ponds, VIC | 16 July 1915 | 23 | France | 38th Battalion | |
| Farmer, Percival Gilmore 'Jim' | Gunner | | | | | 18th Battery Australian Field Artillery; 6th Field Artillery Brigade | |
| Farquhar, William Gordon | Major | Bundaberg, QLD | 18 Apr 1914 | | | 5th Field Company | |
| Farrell, Herbert W. | | | | | Egypt | | Served on the HMAT A45 Bulla |
| Farrow, George Martin | Private | | | | | 18th Battalion | Wounded at Pozières |
| Faulkner, George | Corporal | Bundaberg, QLD | 9 Sep 1915 | 31 | France | 15th Field Ambulance | Served with the 15th Field Ambulance, B Section 5th Division. Wounded in action in May 1917. |
| Fawcett, George H. | Lieutenant | | | | France | 3rd Division | |
| Fell, Robert Valentine | | Glebe Point, NSW | 13 Jul 1915 | 27 | Egypt and Palestine | Imperial Camel Corps; 10th Australian Light Horse 3rd Brigade; Australian Light Horse 7th Brigade | |
| Fenwicke, Thomas Clennell | Lance Corporal | | 8 Sep 1915 | | Western Front | 2nd Division | |
| Ferguson, Arthur Gardere | Captain | Woollarah, NSW | 5 May 1915 | 23 | Gallipoli, France | | Killed in action on 14 Jun 1916 |
| Ferguson, Keith Aubrey | Lieutenant | Bexley, NSW | 16 Mar 1916 | 20 | | | Served in the 3rd Division, Cyclist Battalion |
| Field, Claude J. M. | | | | | | 37th Battalion | Killed in 1917 |
| Fielding, Morris Glanville 'Biff' | 2nd Lieutenant | Parramatta, NSW | | | | | |
| Finlay, George Lush | Captain | Albert Park, VIC | 6 Jul 1915 | 23 | Gallipoli, France | 5th Battalion | |
| Finney, John Spence | Corporal | Castlemaine, VIC | 2 Oct 1916 | | France | 44th Battalion | |
| Fisher, Culbert Cecil | Lance Corporal | Lyndhurst, VIC | 9 Mar 1916 | 19 | Palestine and Egypt | 9th Australian Camel Brigade Field Ambulance | |
| Fisher, Walde Gerard | Lieutenant | Horsham, VIC | 28 Feb 1916 | 21 | | 42nd Battalion | |
| Fitzgerald, Richard Francis | Lieutenant Colonel | | 5 May 1915 | | Gallipoli | 20th Battalion | Awarded the Distinguished Service Order on 25 Jun 1916 |
| Flanagan, Edwin John | Private | Bathurst, NSW | 16 Sep 1916 | 40 | France | 57th Battalion | Served in the 57th Battalion, 7th Reinforcement. He was wounded at Bullecourt, France |
| Flanagan, George Downey | Sapper | | 27 Sep 1916 | | | 4th Division Signal Company | |
| Flenley, Sidney Frank | Private | | 1 May 1916 | | France, Belgium | 3rd Pioneer Battalion | |
| Fletcher, Allan Archibald | Private | Melbourne, VIC | 17 Jul 1915 | | | 14th Battalion | Killed in action at Mont St. Quentin on 18 Sep 1918 |
| Fletcher, Archie | | | | | | | |
| Fletcher, Clarence Stephen | Private | | | | Gallipoli | 27th Battalion | |
| Fletcher, Nora Kathleen | Staff Nurse | Woollahra, NSW | | | | British Red Cross Society | Served as Principal Matron for BRCS in France and worked with the War Committee. She received awards including the Royal Red Cross in 1915 and the Commander of the Order of the British Empire in 1920 in recognition of her service. |
| Flewell-Smith, Bernard | Private | Zillmere, QLD | 18 Apr 1917 | 19 | France | 15th Battalion A.I.F. | Fought in the Battle of Hamel. Bernard Flewell-Smith's 1918 to 1919 Diary |
| Flewell-Smith, John Francis | Colonel | QLD | 28 Jul 1916 | | | Sea Transport Service | Digital copy of diary from August to December 1916Physical copies of diaries held in State Library of Queensland |
| Folkard, Alfred Ernest | Private | | | | France | 3rd Battalion | Died on 14 Aug 1916 of wounds |
| Folks, Allan Edward | Private | | | | France | | Embarked on the troopship HMAT Warilda on 8 Feb 1916. Died of wounds received in action in France on 14 Aug 1916 |
| Forbes, Alfred Ernest | Private | Fitzroy, VIC | | | | 37th Battalion | |
| Ford, Thomas Walter | Corporal | Maryborough, QLD | | | Gallipoli | 9th Battalion | Killed in action on 25 Apr 1915 during the landing at Gallipoli. Frank Thomas Loud found Ford's pack, having lost his own, and reequipped himself, then continued to use Ford's partially used diary. |
| Foreman, Granado Walter | 2nd Lieutenant | Poowong, VIC | 10 Nov 1915 | 21 | | 5th Battalion; Royal Flying Corps | Killed in action on 14 Jul 1917 |
| Forrest, Frederick E. | Lieutenant Colonel | | 20 Sep 1914 | 22 | Gallipoli, France, Belgium | 9th Field Artillery | Awarded the Military Cross for his service |
| Forsyth, Robert | Sapper | | | | Mesopotamia | | |
| Foster, Daniel Edward | Sapper | | | | Gallipoli | 17th Battalion; 4th Field Company | |
| Foster, Edgar Charles | | | | | Gallipoli | 1st Division | Wounded in action in Sep 1915 |
| Fowler, Wilbraham L. | | | | | Gallipoli, France | 15th Battalion | |
| Fox, Stanley J. | Captain | | 5 May 1915 | 22 | Gallipoli, France | 20th Battalion | Served in the 20th Battalion, 4th Division |
| Foxcroft, Arthur John | Private | Coburg, VIC | 9 Aug 1915 | | Egypt, France | 4th Battalion | |
| Franklin, Miles | | | | | | | Joined the Scottish Women's Hospitals for Foreign Service unit |
| Fraser, Alexander Hugh | Captain | | | | | 52nd Battalion | |
| Fraser, Malcolm A. | Lieutenant | | | | France | 51st Battalion | |
| Fraser, William | | | | | | 14th Australian General Hospital; 3rd Light Horse Brigade | Chaplain with the 3rd Light Horse Brigade |
| Frecker, Eric Wilfred | Captain | Paddington, NSW | | | France | 14th Field Ambulance | |
| Freebody, Arthur Henry | | Cooma, NSW; Drummoyne, NSW | 18 Dec 1915 | 27 | France | 31st Battalion | Served in the 31st Battalion, 5th Reinforcement |
| Fricker, Austin Cousens | Private | | 18 Nov 1914 | 26 | Gallipoli | 4th Field Ambulance | |
| Friend, W. P. | Gunner | | | | Western Front | 8 Medium Trench Mortar Battery | |
| Fry, Alan Fraser | Lance Corporal | Lindfield, NSW | 14 Dec 1914 | 22 | Egypt, France | 13th Battalion | Served in the 13th Battalion, 10th Reinforcement. He died of wounds received in battle on 14 Aug 1916 at Somme. |
| Fry, Dene B. | Private | Lindfield, NSW | 14 May 1915 | 22 | France | | Died in France in 1917 |
| Fry, Harold Willoughby | | | | | France | 14th Field Company | Fought at the Battle of the Somme |
| Fry, Reginald Hall | Captain | | | | Gallipoli, France | 1st Division | Served in the Australian Divisional Mechanical Transport Company and the Australian Flying Corps |
| Fudge, Louis Robert | Sergent | Ingham, QLD | 18 Nov 1915 | 29 | Western Front | 41st Battalion, 1st Reinforcement | |
| Fullard, Arthur Frederick | Lieutenant | | | | France | 8th Machine Gun Company | Wounded during the Battle of Fromelles on 19 Jul 1916 |
| Fulton, Arthur Leeman | | | | | France | | Killed in action on 7 August 1916 |
| Fysh, Hudson | | St Leonards, TAS | 25 Aug 1914 | 19 | Gallipoli | 3rd Light Horse Regiment, C Squadron; 67th Squadron | Served in the 3rd Light Horse Regiment, C Squadron, and then the 67th Squadron, Australian Flying Corps, and was awarded the Distinguished Flying Cross in 1918 |
| Gaffney, Peter | Corporal | | | | Gallipoli, France | 26th Battalion | |
| Gair, Richard Leslie | Gunner | | | | France | 10th Field Artillery Brigade; 38th Battery Australian Field Artillery | |
| Gallwey, Wilfred Denver | Private | Rockhampton, QLD | 7 Feb 1916 | 18 | France | 15th Battalion; 47th Battalion | |
| Gammage, John Kingsley | Private | Cootamundra, NSW | Jan 1915 | 27 | Gallipoli, Libya, Palestine | 1st Battalion | Wounded during the Battle of Lone Pine |
| Garden, Norman | Bombardier | | | | | 4th Divisional Ammunition Column | |
| Gardiner, F. | | | | | | 8th Field Ambulance | |
| Garland, Wilfred H | Warrant Officer | | | | Gallipoli | 2nd Battalion | |
| Garling, Terence | Captain | Longueville, NSW | 20 Aug 1914 | 20 | | Gallipoli, France | Served as a gunner with the Australian Field Artillery, Divisional Ammunition Column Section 1. He was killed in action on 5 Apr 1918 near the Somme River |
| Garnock, Reginald Charles David | | | | | Gallipoli | 6th Light Horse Regiment | |
| Garton, Arthur | | | | | | | |
| Geddes, Clifford M. | Corporal | Chatswood, NSW | 19 Aug 1914 | 20 | Gallipoli, France | 13th Battalion; 56th Battalion | |
| Gedling, Stanley Alfred | Leading Signalman | | | | | Royal Australian Navy | Served on HMAS Melbourne |
| Gee, Harry Alfred | Sapper | | | | Western Front | 2nd Tunnelling Company | |
| Gee, Richard Stewart | Major | | | | | 9th Battery Australian Field Artillery | |
| Gellibrand, John | Major General | | | | | | He was created a Knight Commander of the Order of the Bath for his wartime service |
| Gemmell, Gordon S. | | | | | France | 11th Battalion | |
| Gibb, James Brunton (Thomas) | | Drummoyne, NSw | 13 Jul 1915 | 18 | France | 7th Field Ambulance | Performed as part of the Anzac Coves Company, a Field Theatre supported by the Australia Comforts Fund |
| Giblin, Wilfred Wanostrocht | Colonel | | | | Gallipoli | Royal Australian Army Medical Corps | |
| Gibson, Elsie | Sister | Hobart, TAS | 1914 | 27 | Egypt | Australian Army Nursing Service; 2nd Australian General Hospital; 7th Field Ambulance. | Served on the hospital ship HMHS Gascon 1 to 16 and Special Reinforcements (December 1914 - March 1916) |
| Gibson, Hunter | Lance Corporal | Bundarra, NSW | 17 Aug 1914 | 23 | Egypt, Gallipoli, France | 4th Battalion; 1st Australian Light Trench Mortar Battery | Served in the 4th Battalion, 1st Division, and then the 1st Australian Light Trench Mortar Battery |
| Giddings, Oliver Thomas | Private | Geurie, NSW | | | Gallipoli, Western Front | 3rd Battalion | |
| Giffin, Cecil | Private | Manildra, NSW | 8 Sep 1914 | 26 | Egypt France Belgium | 6th Light Horse Regiment | |
| Giles, A. C. | | | | | | 1st Machine Gun Battalion | |
| Giles, Arthur Clyde | Corporal | Stanmore NSW | 10 Jun 1915 | 28 | Egypt, France | 1st Battalion | Served in the 1st Battalion, 15th Reinforcement. He was wounded in action on two occasions, on 18 Aug 1916 and on 4 Oct 1917 |
| Giles, John Albert | Private | Petersham, NSW | 7 Sep 1915 | 32 | Egypt, France, German POW camp | 53rd Battalion | Served in the 53rd Battalion, 14th Brigade. After being reported missing on 28 Jul 1916, he was reported as a POW on 12 Aug 1916 and remained a POW until the end of the war |
| Gill, George Thomasson | Corporal | Rockhampton, QLD | 18 Jul 1915 | 29 | Egypt, France, Belgium | 6th Battalion; 17th Battalion; 55th Battalion | Commended in Jun 1917 for gallant action |
| Gillett, Walter Edward | Sergeant | Kalamunda, WA | 3 Apr 1916 | 42 | France | 51st Battalion | Awarded the Meritorious Service Medal in 1919 |
| Gillies, William Keith | | Manly, NSW | 3 Jan 1916 | 22 | | | Served in the Field Engineers of the 15th Company of the 5th Division |
| Gilroy, Norman Thomas | | Glebe, NSW | | | | | Served as a telegraphist officer and after the war became Roman Catholic Archbishop of Sydney |
| Gissing, Henry Ernest | Sergeant | Ashfield | 14 Dec 1914 | 26 | Gallipoli, France, Belgium | 1st Field Ambulance; 14th Field Ambulance | Served in the 1st and 14th Field Ambulance, Australian Army Medical Corps |
| Goddard, Charles James | Major | | | | | Australian Army Service Corps | Awarded the Distinguished Service Order in 1917 |
| Godlee, Francis Lister | Sergeant | Sliding Rock, SA | 26 Aug 1914 | | Gallipoli | 1st Brigade; 3rd Light Horse Regiment | |
| Golding, Albert | | | 23 Jul 1915 | | France | 2nd Pioneer Battalion | |
| Goldrich, Robert Austen | 2nd Lieutenant | Little Bay, NSW | 18 Aug 1915 | 26 | France, Belgium | 36th Battalion | Served in the 36th Battalion, B Company. He was awarded the Military Cross |
| Goldring, Leslie | Staff Sergeant | Sydney, NSW | 24 Aug 1914 | 19 | Gallipoli | 12th Field Artillery Brigade | |
| Goodacre, Charles A. | Sergeant Major | | | | Greece | 60th British General Hospital | |
| Goodwin, Thomas | | Stanmore, NSW | 24 Aug 1914 | 34 | Gallipoli, France | | Served in the 2nd Battery, 1st Field Artillery Brigade. He was awarded the Croix de guerre in 1918 |
| Gordon, Alexander Dundas | Private | Watson's Bay, NSW | 24 Aug 1914 | 26 | Egypt, Gallipoli | 1st Field Ambulance | |
| Gorrell, James Kingsley | Private | Unanderra, NSW | 18 Jul 1915 | 23 | Egypt, Sinai, Palestine | 1st Light Horse Field Ambulance | Served in the 1st Light Horse Field Ambulance, 16th Reinforcement |
| Gower, George Ernest | Private | Rosewood, QLD | 10 Nov 1914 | 23 | Gallipoli | 15th Battalion | Stretcher bearer in the 15th Battalion, Australian Army Medical Corps. |
| Graham, Grace E. | | | | | | | |
| Grant, Douglas | | Atherton, Qld | 6 Jan 1916 | 30 | France, Belgium | 13th Battalion | Wounded and captured in Apr 1917 and a German POW until the end of the war. Grant is one of 400 Aboriginal Australians known to have fought in the war. |
| Grant, Harold Douglas | Sapper | | | | France | Divisional signals | |
| Grant, Robert Anthony | Private | | | | Gallipoli | 1st Battalion | |
| Gray, Arthur Horace | Regimental Sergeant | Dulwich Hill NSW | 11 Aug 1914 | 30 | | 19th Battalion | Received the Distinguished Conduct Medal for conspicuous gallantry at Pozières. He was killed by a sniper on 10 Nov 1916 |
| Gray, E. Gladstone | Sergeant | | | | Gallipoli, France | 2nd Field Ambulance | |
| Gray, Ethel | Matron | Carlton, VIC | 9 Feb 1915 | 38 | France, England | Australian Army Nursing Service. No. 1 Australian Auxiliary Hospital 2nd Australian General Hospital||Awards: Royal Red Cross, 1st class. Mentioned in dispatches (1917, 1919). Appointed CBE (1919). Medaille de la Reconnaissance Française (1920) | |
| Gray, Samuel | Private | | | | France | 6th Field Ambulance | |
| Greatorex, James Joseph | Lieutenant | Coburg, VIC | 14 Sep 1914 | 28 | Gallipoli, Palestine | 1st Light Horse Brigade; 1st Machine Gun Squadron | |
| Green, George | Reverend Captain | Rockhampton, QLD | 8 Sep 1914 | 34 | Gallipoli and Middle East | 2nd/14th Australian Light Horse | |
| Green, James | Private | Sydney, NSW | 10 Aug 1915 | 29 | France, Belgium | 17th Battalion | Served in the 17th Battalion, 6th Brigade |
| Greenhill, Ernest Percy Leslie | Sapper | Richmond, VIC | 27 Jan 1916 | | France | 7th Field Company | |
| Gregor, Charles Henry | Private | | | | Gallipoli | 7th Field Ambulance | |
| Gregson, William Hilder | Sergeant | Roseville, NSW | 23 Aug 1915 | 38 | France | | Killed in action in France in 1916 |
| Greig, George Fergus | Company Sergeant Major | Ascot Vale, VIC | 17 Aug 1914 | 23 | Gallipoli | 7th Battalion | Killed in action on 8 May 1915 |
| Greig, Malcolm Murray Alexander | Private | Kingsthorpe, QLD | 4 May 1916 | 36 | | 42nd Battalion | Served in the 42nd Battalion, 4th reinforcement, and died of wounds received in action on 6 Oct 1917 |
| Griffiths, Lewis H. | | | | | Gallipoli, France | 3rd Australian General Hospital | |
| Grimwade, Edward R. | | | | | | | |
| Grimwade, Harold Williams | Major General | St. Kilda, VIC | | | France | 3rd Division Artillery | Commander of the 3rd Division Artillery in 1918 |
| Grinyer, Alfred | | Ashfield | 9 Nov 1915 | 24 | France, Belgium | 7th Australian Field Ambulance | Discharged on 2 Jul 1918 for medical reasons |
| Grover, H. | | | | | | Royal Australian Army Medical Corps | |
| Grubb, E. William | Lieutenant | | | | Gallipoli, France | 40th Battalion | Killed in action in 1918 near Morlancourt |
| Guard, William Henry Gladstone | Second Lieutenant | Bulli, NSW | 12 Aug 1914 | 20 | | 20th Battalion | Served in the Australian Naval and Military Expeditionary Force |
| Gunn, Ronald 'Max' McGregor | Private | Launceston, TAS | | | Gallipoli, England, France | 3rd Field Ambulance; 13th Field Ambulance | |
| Gunter, Arthur Charles | Sergeant | | | | Gallipoli | 1st Field Artillery Brigade; 3rd Battery Australian Field Artillery | |
| Guppy, Alfred Leslie | Company Quartermaster Sergeant | Benalla, VIC | 16 Sep 1914 | 27 | Gallipoli, France | 14th Battalion | |
| Gwyther, Leo Tennyson | Captain | Leongatha, VIC | 20 Aug 1914 | 20 | | 2nd Field Artillery | Awarded the Military Cross and Bar |
