= George Green (chaplain) =

English army chaplain (1881-1956)

- Chaplain
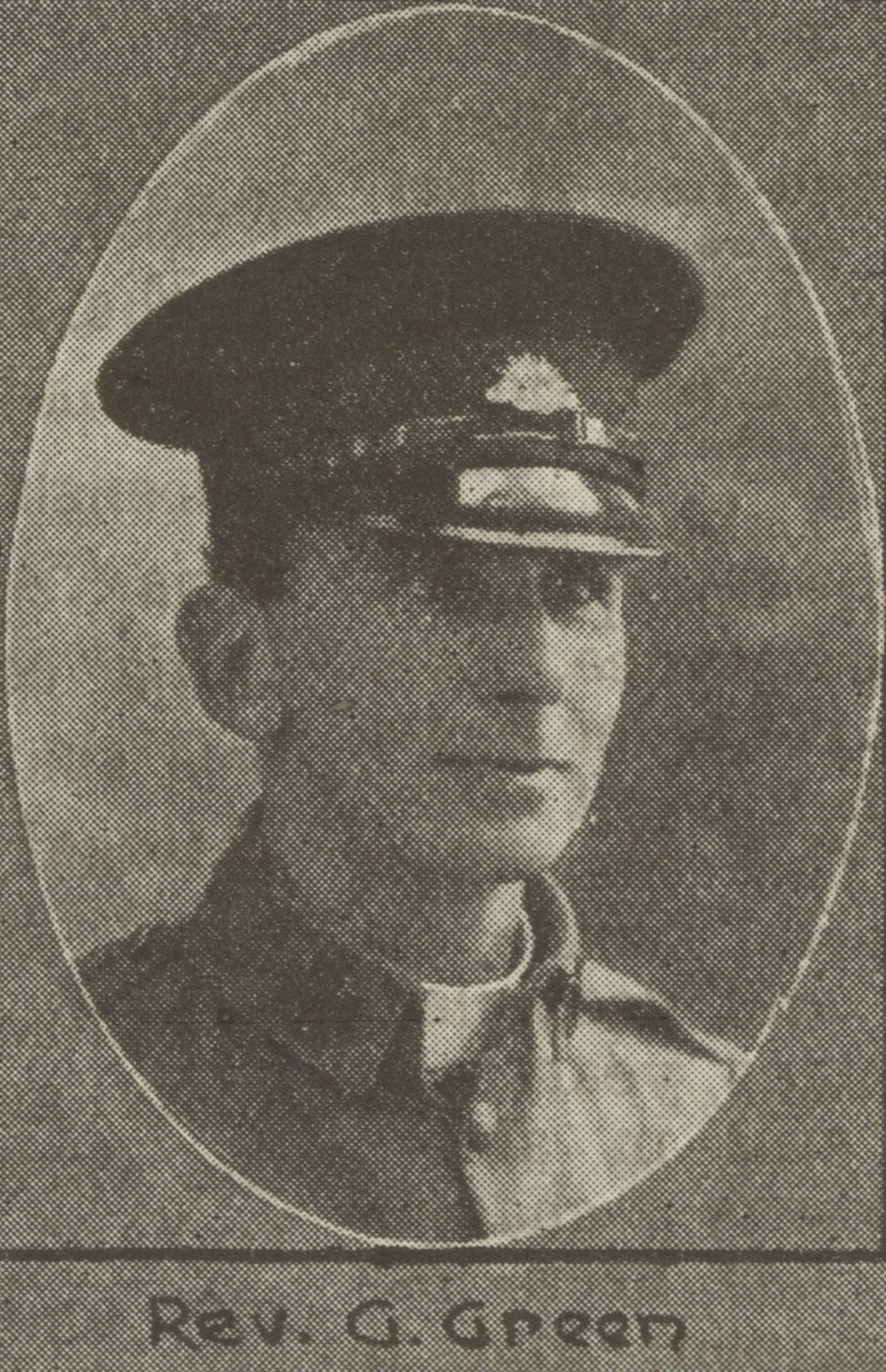
- Green in 1914
- Church: St Paul's Cathedral, Rockhampton

Orders
- Ordination: 1910

Personal details
- Born: July 10, 1881 London
- Died: 1956 (aged 74–75)
- Denomination: Anglican
- Education: Oxford University

Reverend Captain George Green (1881–1956) was an Anglican clergyman from Emerald and Rockhampton in Central Queensland, Australia, when he enlisted in the Australian Army in September 1914. He served as a chaplain with the 2nd Light Horse Regiment at Gallipoli and in the Middle Eastern campaigns. His diaries are considered one of the most poignant and detailed descriptions of Australian Imperial Forces during the Gallipoli campaign in World War I.

== Early life ==
Born in London on 10 July 1881, Green was ordained in 1910. Equipped with a Bachelor of Arts from Oxford University, he migrated to Australia and established himself in central Queensland, working in Mount Chalmers, Yeppoon and Emu Park, as part of the North Rockhampton parish, before appointment as the vicar of St Luke's in Emerald, then back to St Paul's Cathedral in Rockhampton.

== Military career and diaries ==
The 33 year old Green enlisted in September 1914 and was appointment as a chaplain (4th Class). He embarked for Egypt with the 1st Light Horse Regiment on 21 October 1914 on board the HMAT Orvieto and served at Gallipoli from May 1915 with the 2nd Light Horse Regiment.

Green kept a detailed diary of his time at Gallipoli, and in eloquent and honest prose vividly described the horrors of the campaign. In the dust and heat and flies he tended his flock, providing what pastoral care he could.

One of his most important and distressing tasks was burying the dead. He wrote,

I remember registering the resolve to be studiously callous about funerals otherwise it was obvious I would not last another week… I was among the burialparty to go over into territory between the trenches. There I beheld a sight I never shall forget and struck a smell awful beyond anything I’ve ever experienced ... I said committal over about fifteen bodies most of whom were decayed beyond recognition.

He was full of admiration for the men and wrote, "The valour, spirit, patience and determination of these Australian soldiers are beyond all praise." In his dugout, Green was just as susceptible to sickness, lice and shrapnel fire as his comrades in the front trenches and suffered his share of discomfort and illness. In November 1915 he was admitted to the 19th General Hospital in Alexandria, Egypt, with enteritis, and in December he was described as being "dangerously ill". He was sent home to Australia on the ship Suffolk on 29 January 1916 for recuperation and rest.

Padre Green returned to duty in Europe in October 1916 and was taken on strength with the 4th Division headquarters, and later served with the 13th Brigade, the 2nd Australian Auxiliary Hospital, and various AIF depots in England and France. He returned to Australia in 1919, and continued his vocation in Melbourne before returning to England.

== Later life and death ==
On 22 July 1938 Green received the honour of reading the dedication at the unveiling of the Australian War Memorial at Villers-Bretonneux in France. The memorial was erected to "perpetuate the memory of the Australian Imperial Forces in France and Flanders and the 11,000 Australians who fell in France and have no known grave". The ceremony was attended by King George VI who unveiled the monument.

Green died in England in 1956.

== See also ==
- List of Australian diarist of World War I
