= War diary =

Type of official record kept by military

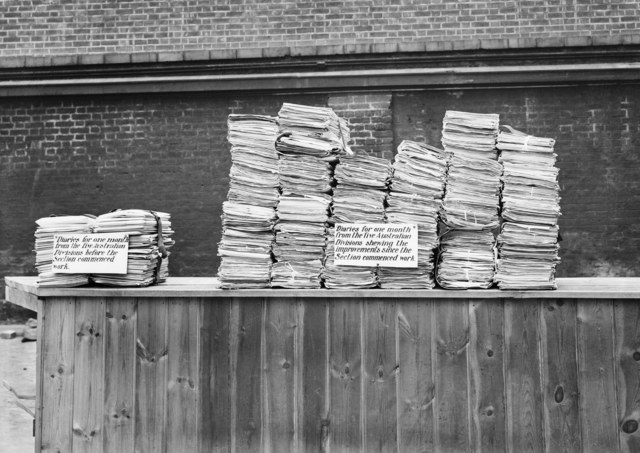
A comparison of the war diaries completed by the First Australian Imperial Force in one month. The left side shows the month before an effort was undertaken to improve their quality, the right side shows the month after these measures came into effect

A war diary is a regularly updated official record kept by military units of their activities during wartime. The purpose of these diaries is to both record information which can later be used by the military to improve its training and tactics as well as to generate a detailed record of units' activities for future use by historians. War diaries are focused on the administration and operations of the unit they cover, but may also contain information about individual personnel.

== History ==
War diaries (German: Kriegstagebuch, plural Kriegstagebücher) were invented by the Prussian Army. On 22 April 1850, the Prussian Minister of War, August von Stockhausen, ordered that all commanders of major units should keep war diaries. All significant military actions, relocations, important messages and orders, casualties, material losses, reinforcements etc. were to be recorded. Subsequent regulations of 1870 in Prussia, of 1895 and 1916 in the German Empire, and of 1940 in Nazi Germany were largely identical to the Prussian 1850 regulations.

The British Army first required that its units keep war diaries in 1907 as a means of preventing its mistakes of the Second Boer War from being repeated. (Note: This was formalised in Field Service Regulations, Part II, Chapter XVI, Paragraph 140.) This practice was maintained during the First World War and beyond, and units operating in war zones continue to maintain such diaries. The war diaries kept by Australian military units are normally maintained by the unit's adjutant or intelligence officer and contain a regularly updated narrative of its activities as well as copies of reports, messages received and maps.

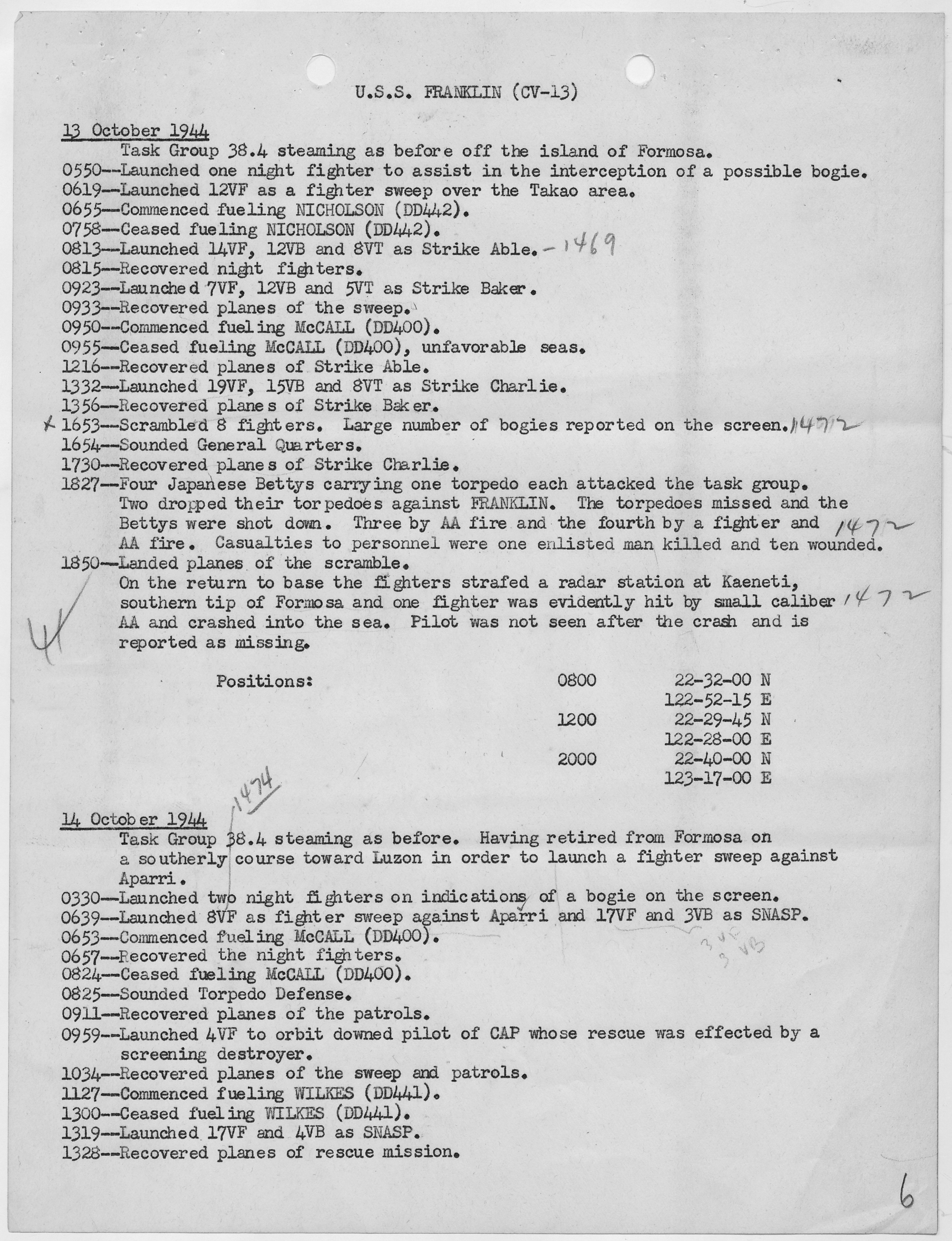
A page from the War Diary of USS Franklin, October 13, 1944. - NARA - 305242

World War II War Diaries from units of the US Navy (including all ships) and Marine Corps were declassified on December 31, 2012, by the Office of the Chief of Naval Operations (OCNO) and made available to the public through the National Archives and Records Administration (NARA). These war diaries are part of a larger collection of records from the OCNO at NARA, currently spanning 1875 to 2006.

== See also ==
- Logbook (also known as a "captain's log")
- Service record (a less detailed equivalent of a war diary for an individual soldier)
- List of Australian diarists of World War I
- Joseph Bédier (1864–1938), French writer and scholar who made use of German World War I Kriegstagebücher
