= Joseph Beeston =

Politician, surgeon and soldier in New South Wales, Australia

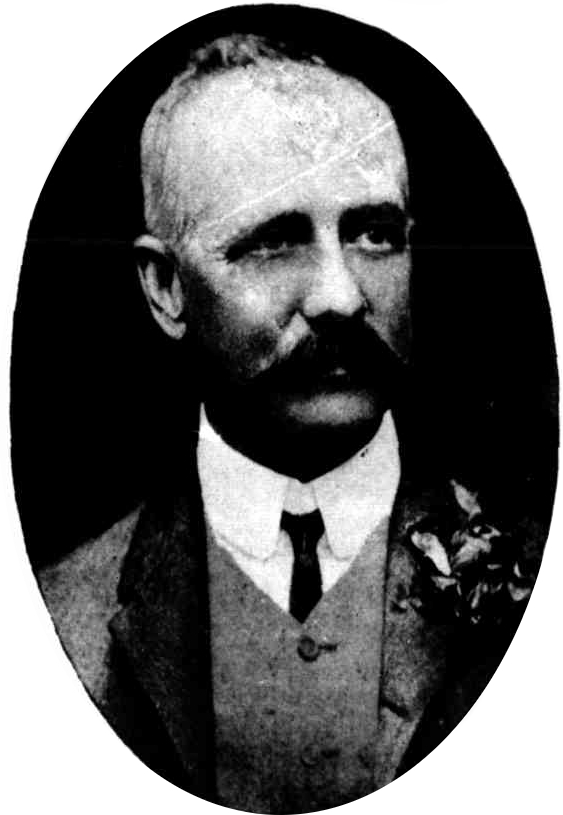

Member of the New South Wales Legislative Council
- In office 21 July 1908 – 8 March 1921

Personal details
- Born: 19 September 1859 Newcastle, New South Wales
- Died: 8 March 1921 (aged 61) Newcastle, New South Wales
- Resting place: Sandgate Cemetery
- Party: Liberal Reform Party (until 1916); Nationalist Party (from 1917)
- Education: Royal College of Surgeons in Ireland

Military service
- Allegiance: Australia
- Branch/service: Citizen Military Forces; Australian Imperial Force
- Rank: Colonel
- Commands: 4th Field Ambulance (1914–15)
- Battles/wars: First World War; Gallipoli campaign
- Awards: Companion of the Order of St Michael and St George; Colonial Auxiliary Forces Officers' Decoration; Mentioned in Despatches

Joseph Lievesley Beeston, CMG, VD (19 September 1859 – 8 March 1921) was a politician, surgeon and soldier in New South Wales, Australia.

Beeston was born in Newcastle, New South Wales, to traffic manager John Lievesley Beeston and Amelia Jane Denison. He received a local education before travelling to Ireland, where he studied at the Royal College of Surgeons in Dublin. Around 1881 he married Anna Maria Read, with whom he had four children. He returned to New South Wales, practising in Newcastle as a surgeon in a number of partnerships and as honorary surgeon at Newcastle Hospital. In 1908 he was appointed to the New South Wales Legislative Council, where he generally supported the Liberals. In 1914 he enlisted in the Australian Imperial Force with the Australian Army Medical Corps, commanding the 4th Field Ambulance and serving at Gallipoli. He achieved the rank of colonel, but was invalided after contracting malaria and returned to Australia in 1916, later writing a book about his experiences, Five months at ANZAC. In 1915 he was appointed Companion of the Order of St Michael and St George. He also received the Colonial Auxiliary Forces Officers' Decoration and was Mentioned in Despatches.

Beeston died at Newcastle in 1921, aged 61.
