= List of Australian diarists of World War I (O-Z) =

This is part of the list of Australian diarists of World War I, covering diarists with family names beginning with "O" through to "Z". List of A-G and H-N.

Name	Rank	Town of Origin	Date of enlistment	Age at enlistment	Theatres	Unit	Notes
O'Donnell, James Francis	Sergeant	Sydney	18 May 1916	30	France and Belgium	30th Battalion	Served in the 30th Battalion, 8th Brigade
O'Hare, Ambrose	Lance Sergeant	Harbord	15 Apr 1915	38	New Guinea, Egypt, Gallipoli, France		Served in the Australian Naval and Military Expeditionary Force, and later the 19th Battalion
Olsson, William Frederick	Private	Coogee	17 Jan 1916	30		1st Pioneer Battalion	Served in the 1st Pioneer Battalion, 4th Reinforcement
Osborne, William Toovey	Mechanical Transport Driver	Rockhampton, Qld	29 Feb 1916	24	France and Belgium	6th Motor Transport Company	
Ottery, William Charles	Sergeant		16 Feb 1917		France	60th Battalion	
Ottway, Lancelot	Sergeant	Inverell, NSW	3 Nov 1915	21	France, Belgium		
Owen, Philip Ernest	Private	Penshurst NSW	30 Nov 1916	29		1st Pioneer Battalion; 17th Infantry Battalion	Served in the 1st Pioneer Battalion, 9th Reinforcement and the 17th Infantry Battalion
Oxman, George	Sapper	Wollongong, NSW	27 Mar 1916	30		3rd Tunnelling Company	
Pain, Harry Ormond	Private	Kensington, VIC	16 Mar 1915		Western Front	24th Battalion	
Palmer, Joseph Adam	Private	Raymond Terrace, NSW	8 Dec 1915	18	France	34th Battalion	
Panton, Alan Clement	Driver	Molonglo, ACT	19 Aug 1914			Royal Australian Army Service Corps	
Parker, Harold Hill	Private	Emerald, VIC	1915		France	58th Battalion	Killed in action on 26 Sep 1917 at Ypres.
Parkes, Stanley Thomas	Captain	Melbourne, VIC			Gallipoli	3rd Light Horse Field Ambulance	
Parramore, George William	Captain		17 Jul 1917		France, Belgium	Royal Australian Army Medical Corps	
Parsons, Henry Joseph		Leichhardt, NSW	2 Jul 1916	22	France	13th Battalion	Served in the 13th Battalion, 21st Reinforcement until taken prisoner at Reincourt on 11 Apr 1917 during the First Battle of Bullecourt
Partridge, Darrell John	Sergeant	Dungog	28 Aug 1914	23	Egypt, Gallipoli, France	Australian Army Medical Corps	Awarded the Military Medal for his service at the Battle of Bullecourt
Paterson, Andrew Barton (Banjo)		Sydney, NSW	13 Oct 1915	49	Middle East		In command of the Australian Remount Squadron from Oct 1916 to mid-1919
Patton, James Valentine					France, Palestine		Army chaplain
Paull, H.					Gallipoli, France, Belgium	1st Australian Field Artillery; 3rd Brigade Ammunition Column; 1st Divisional Ammunition Column; 36th Battery Australian Heavy Artillery	Served in the 1st Australian Field Artillery, the 3rd Brigade Ammunition Column, the 3rd Section, 1st Divisional Ammunition Column, and the 36th Battery Australian Heavy Artillery
Paull, Peter Raphael	Captain		22 Sep 1914		Gallipoli	16th Battalion	
Peach, William Edward	Sergeant	Beechworth, VIC				7th Battalion	Awarded the Military Medal
Peacock, Ashley Royden	Private				France	13th Battalion	
Pearce, Maurice Evelyn	2nd Lieutenant	Orange, NSW	8 Mar 1915	25	Egypt, Gallipoli, Sinai peninsula	1st Light Horse Brigade	
Pearce, Norman Lee	Gunner	Hillston, NSW	6 Apr 1915	23	Gallipoli, France	5th Field Ambulance Unit; 13th Field Artillery Brigade	Fought at the Battle of the Somme. He was killed on 20 Nov 1916
Pearson, William	Lance Corporal	Leichhardt, NSW	14 Aug 1915	22	France, Belgium		
Penty, Robert E.	Private				France	18th Battalion	Died in 1916
Perry, Stanley Llewellyn	Lieutenant Colonel	Sydney, NSW			Middle East, France	45th Battalion	
Peters, Charles Harold	Captain	Heidelberg, Victoria	21 Jul 1916	27	France	38th Battalion	Awarded the Military Cross and Bar for bravery while serving at Armentières and his actions while serving at the Hindenburg Line
Petersen, Jens	Private	Paddington	26 Oct 1917	25	France		
Peterson, William	Sergeant	Warwick, Qld	23 Aug 1914	33	Egypt, Gallipoli, Sinai peninsula	2nd Light Horse Brigade	Served in the 2nd Light Horse Brigade until wounded in the Battle of Rafa on 16 Apr 1917
Pflaum, Theodor Milton	Second Lieutenant	Birdwood, SA	21 Jul 1915	19	France	32nd Battalion	
Phelps, Edwin Walter	Private	Ryde, NSW	20 Apr 1916	15	France, Germany (POW)	45th Battalion; 13th Battalion	Served in the 45th and 13th Battalions until wounded and taken prisoner in Apr 1917
Pickup, Robert Samuel	Captain	Aurburn, NSW	18 Aug 1915	16	Egypt, France	45th Battalion	
Pidcock, John William	Lieutenant	Tatham, NSW	1 Sep 1914	21	Gallipoli, Egypt	4th Division; 42nd Battery Australian Field Artillery; Royal Australian Army Medical Corps	
Pillow, Roy Nelson	Cadet	Geelong, VIC	6 Aug 1915	20		3rd Casualty Clearing Station; Australian Flying Corps	
Pitcher, Albert James	Sergeant		13 Mar 1915		Egypt, Gallipoli	24th Battalion	
Pitman, Elsie C. W.							
Plummer, Horace Sydney "Syd"	Colonel					6th Battalion	
Poate, Hugh Raymond Guy	Lieutenant Colonel		24 Aug 1914	20	Gallipoli	1st Field Ambulance	
Pockley, Brian Coldin-Antill	Captain	North Sydney	17 Aug 1914	24			Killed in action on 11 Sep 1914 while serving in the Australian Naval and Military Expeditionary Force. He was the first Australian officer to be killed in action during World War I
Pointon, Percy Charles						11th Light Horse Regiment	
Polinelli, L.	Private				France	21st Battalion	
Pollitt, William Alexander	Driver					1st Field Ambulance	
Poole, Stodart A.	Private				France	1st Field Ambulance	
Potter, Reynold Cleve	Private	Glen Innes, NSW	5 Aug 1916	28	France, Belgium	21st Battalion	
Poulton, James William	Private	Ipswich, QLD	4 Jan 1916	24	France	13th Field Ambulance	
Powell, Thomas Henry Norman	Lieutenant	Warrnambool, VIC			Gallipoli	2nd Field Ambulance	Died in 1917
Powell, William Hope							Served in the Royal Australian Navy on HMAS Encounter and HMAS Australia. As a wireless telegraphist on HMAS Encounter, he may have been the first on board to receive the notice that war had been declared.
Priest, Percy A.	Private				France	5th Machine Gun Company	
Pringle, Robert	Private					15th Brigade	
Probert, Keith J.	Lieutenant	Broken Hill, NSW	19 Aug 1914	20			
Pryce, Henry Weston		Cooma, NSW	8 May 1916	25		23rd Machine Gun Company	
Pybus, R. K.	Major					43rd Battery Australian Field Artillery	Died in 1917
Pye, Joseph Henry		Mudgee, NSW	3 Dec 1914	42	France and Belgium		Served in the 5th Divisional train, 5th Field Bakery
Pyke, Arthur Richard			14 Sep 1914	27	Egypt, Gallipoli		
Quinane, Patrick J.	Trooper				Gallipoli	7th Light Horse Regiment	
John Norman Radcliffe		Brisbane					
Rainsford, Walter Bruce		Sydney, NSW	15 Oct 1914	18	Egypt France	14th Field Ambulance	Served in the Australian Army Medical Corps and the 14th Field Ambulance
Ralston, Alexander	Lieutenant Colonel	Croyden, NSW	7 May 1915	30		Australian Naval and Military Expeditionary Force; 2nd Machine Gun Battalion	Commanded the 2nd Machine Gun Battalion
Ramsay, Robert A.							
Ranford, Joseph Marmion	Sergeant	Port Adelaide, SA			Egypt, Gallipoli	3rd Light Horse Regiment	Killed in action on 4 Aug 1916
Ransom, Herbert William	Private				Gallipoli	6th Battalion	
Raven, William George	Lance Sergeant				France, Egypt	29th Battalion; 5th Pioneer Battalion	
Archibald Hewland Raymond	Captain	Brisbane			Gallipoli, France	2nd Brigade, Australian Field Artillery	Son of Alfred John Raymond. Killed in action 3 March 1917 near Albert, Somme, France
Read, Clarence Hansby	Lieutenant	Bellevue Hill	11 Aug 1914		New Guinea		Served in the Royal Naval Reserve
Redford, Thomas Harold	Major	Warrnambool, VIC				8th Light Horse Regiment	Killed in action on 7 Aug 1915. After his death, Major William McGrath (also of the 8th Light Horse Regiment) is believed to have used Redford's diary
Reed, Frederick Garnet	Sapper	Kadina, SA					Reed recorded entries in his diary in Aug 1917, and the diary was then used by Eric Madden
Rees, James R. (Jim)	Private						
Rees, Katie (Kate)	Sister					Australian Army Nursing Service	
Rees, Wilfred Benjamin	Gunner	Penrith, NSW				Ammunition columns	
Reiach, James						Royal Australian Army Medical Corps	
Reid, George L.					England, France	3rd Squadron Australian Flying Corps	
Reid, John Anderson	Private				Egypt, Gallipoli, France	23rd Battalion	
Reid, John	Corporal	Hawthorn, VIC			France	22nd Battalion	Killed in action on 5 Aug 1916
Reid, W.						16th Battalion	
Reilly, Andrew	Corporal				Gallipoli, Western Front	2nd Field Company	Awarded the Military Medal on 5 Jul 1918
Reynolds, Herbert Vincent	Private				Gallipoli, France	1st Field Ambulance	Served as a stretcher bearer
Reynolds, Wynfrith	Private	Hobart, TAS	1 Sep 1914	33	Egypt, Gallipoli	3rd Australian Light Horse	Served in C Squadron, 3rd Australian Light Horse
Rhodes, Oscar	Corporal	Sydney, NSW	26 Apr 1915	27	Egypt, Gallipoli, France	20th Battalion	Served in the 20th Battalion until he was wounded in action at Butte de Warlencourt on 25 Feb 1917 and lost his left leg
Richards, Roy		Homebush, NSW	2 Mar 1915	21		19th Battalion	Served in the 19th Battalion, 5th Australian Machine Gun Company. He died on 26 Nov 1916 after being wounded on 6 Nov 1916
Richards, Samuel Jabez	Major	Mount Morgan, Qld	26 Oct 1914	50		1st Australian Clearing Hospital, Hospital Ship Sicilia	Served with the First Australian Clearing Hospital in Egypt and on the hospital ship Sicilia at Gallipoli until he died of pneumonia on 21 Jul 1915
Richards, Thomas James "Rusty"	Lieutenant	Armidale, NSW			Gallipoli, Western Front	1st Battalion	Awarded the Military Cross at Bullecourt
Richardson, Leslie Duncan Richardson		Adelaide, SA	20 Jun 1915	23	Turkey	1st Light Horse regiment	Served in the 1st Light Horse regiment until captured by the Turks in Aug 1916
Richmond, Daisy Donaldson	Sister		21 Nov 1914	31	Egypt, France	Australian Army Nursing Service. No 2 Australian General Hospital	Mentioned in dispatches, and was awarded Associate of the Royal Red Cross
Riddell, Clarence	Corporal	Elsternwick, Victoria	6 Apr 1916	24	Gallipoli		Served in the 4th Field Company of Engineers
Riddle, A.	Corporal					Australian Naval and Military Expeditionary Force	
Rider, Edwin	Private	Waterloo, NSW	6 Jan 1915	21	Gallipoli	4th Battalion	Wounded on 11 Aug 1915 at Lone Pine
Ridge, Victor Farran					France	37th Battalion	
Riley, Frederick					Pacific, Rabaul, Africa		Chaplain on board HMAS Australia
Roberts, Clarence Rupert	Corporal	Ballarat, VIC	18 Aug 1914		Gallipoli	8th Battalion	Died on 13 Aug 1915 after being wounded at Lone Pine
Roberts, E. G.					Western Front	1st Squadron Australian Flying Corps	
Roberts, Francis William		Upper Hawthorn, VIC	1 May 1916	27	France	21st Battalion	Served in the 21st Battalion, 6th Brigade, 2nd Division until killed in action at Mont St Quentin on 1 Sep 1918
Roberts, G. D.						Gallipoli	Served on the SS City of Benares
Robertson, Cameron Desaile		Rozelle, NSW	17 Aug 1914	19	Gallipoli, France	4th Pioneer Battalion	Served in the 4th Pioneer Battalion and was awarded the Military Cross for his actions at Gueudecourt in Nov and Dec 1916
Robertson, Otto		Moore Park, Sydney, NSW	5 Oct 1916	23			Served with the Auxiliary Mechanical Transport Company 2
Rodda, Arthur Leslie		Bourke, NSW	12 Oct 1916	28	France, Belgium	35th Battalion	Served in the 35th Battalion under hospitalised in Oct 1917
Rodgers, Robert T	Sergeant				Egypt, France	12th Field Artillery Brigade; 45th Battery Australian Field Artillery	
Rogers, John David	Brigadier	Penguin, TAS			Egypt, France	6th Battalion	
Rogers, Robert Cornelius	Private	Swan Hill, VIC			France, Belgium	15th Brigade; 57th Battalion	Died in 1917
Rose, Geoffrey		Petersham, NSW	24 Aug 1916	20	France, Belgium	30th Battalion	Served in the 30th Battalion, 11th Reinforcement
Rose, Thomas James	Lance Corporal				France	36th Battalion	
Rosenthal, Sir Charles	Major-General	Gordon, Sydney	25 Aug 1914	39	Gallipoli, France, Belgium	3rd Field Artillery Brigade	Commanding officer of the 3rd Field Artillery Brigade, and later the artillery of the 4th Division, the 9th Infantry Brigade, and the 2nd Division.
Ross, Donald Rutherford	Private				France	23rd Battalion	
Ross, Dudley Bruce	Gunner	North Adelaide, SA			France	13th Field Artillery Brigade	
Ross, Ronald Campbell	Sergeant				Gallipoli, Middle East	8th Light Horse Regiment	
Ross-King, Alice	Major	Ballarat, VIC				1 Australian General Hospital; Australian Army Nursing Service	While working at the 2nd Casualty Clearing Station she was awarded a Military Medal
Rostron, A.	Private					1st Battalion	Died in 1918
Roth, Reuter Emerich					Gallipoli, Middle East	5th Field Ambulance	Created a Companion of the Most Distinguished Order of Saint Michael and Saint George in 1917
Rouget, Arthur James	Private				Gallipoli, France	13th Light Horse Regiment	
Routledge, Howard	Gunner	Prahran, VIC				114th Howitzer Battery	
Rowe, Roy	Warrant Officer Class 1	Newstead, VIC				14th Australian General Hospital; 2nd Stationary Hospital	
Russell, George					France		
Russell, Thomas A.							Served on HMAS Australia
Ryder, W. C.	Corporal				France	7th Field Artillery Brigade	
Saber, Alan M.	Private				Western Front	21st Battalion	
Sadler, Rupert Markham	Lieutenant Colonel	Paddington, NSW				17th Battalion	
Samson, P. G.	Private		20 Mar 1916		France	10th Field Ambulance	Served in the 10th Field Ambulance and the 2nd Casualty Clearing Station
Sanders, H. T. (Tom)	Private					7th Field Ambulance	
Sandilands, Christopher	Sergeant				France	16th Battalion	
Saunders, William Hilton		Goodooga, NSW	15 Oct 1915	21	France	4th Division Ammunition Column	
Savige, Stanley George	Captain	Prahran, Victoria	22 Mar 1915	24	France, Persia		Awarded the Military Cross at Bullecourt, the Distinguished Service Order at Urmia, and was mentioned in dispatches
Schaeffer, Louis E.	Private	Sydney, NSW	8 Jun 1915	20	Egypt		Served in the Australian Army Medical Corps as an orderly on the hospital Ship HMAHS Karoola
Scheidel, Norman		Waverley NSW	22 Mar 1915	21	Gallipoli	18th Battalion	Served in the 18th Battalion and was killed in action at Gallipoli on 22 Aug 1915
Schwinghammer, Verdi George		Grafton, NSW	14 Jul 1916	25	France	42nd Battalion	
Scolyer, Mervyn William	Lance Corporal				France	40th Battalion	
Scott, John Philipson	Private	Sydney, NSW	26 May 1916	30	France	45th Battalion	
Searcy, John William	Lieutenant				Gallipoli	10th Battalion	
Sexton, Clarence William	Lieutenant				France	2nd Division	
Shearman, Stewart Frederick	Private				France, Belgium	9th Field Ambulance	
Sheidel, N. D.	Private					Australian Naval and Military Expeditionary Force	
Shelley, Max Robert	Lieutenant	Sydney, NSW			Western Front	3rd Squadron Australian Flying Corps	
Sheppard, William H.	Captain					17th Battalion; Australian Naval and Military Expeditionary Force	
Sheppeard, Alfred Edward	Lieutenant				Western Front	5th Division	
Sherarer, James H.	Private				France	15th Battalion	
Shirtley, William Frederick "Eric"	Lieutenant				Gallipoli, France	13th Battalion	Died in 1917
Shoobridge, Frank Sydney	Private					2nd Field Ambulance	A stretcher bearer, he was wounded and gassed while assisting injured soldiers
Short, George Robert	Lieutenant Colonel				Gallipoli, France	17th Battalion	
Siddeley, S. W.	Corporal				Gallipoli	Australian Army Medical Corps	
Silas, Ellis	Private	Cliff Terrace, Perth	28 Sep 1914	30	Gallipoli	16th Battalion	Landed at Gallipoli on 25 Apr 1915, and was evacuated in May with shell shock and fever
Simmons, William James		Northcote, Vict	7 Feb 1916	26	France		Served at casualty clearing stations
Sinclair, Alan Russel Callender	Lieutenant					Royal Naval Reserve	Served on HMS Princess Margaret
Small, Frederick Trouton	Lieutenant					3rd Field Company; 5th Field Company	
Small, William Filmer					Gallipoli		
Smee, Laurie John	Able Seaman Driver				Gallipoli	1st Royal Australian Navy Bridging Train	
Smith, Arthur Henson	Captain	Castlemaine, Victoria	31 Aug 1914	24	Egypt, Gallipoli, France, Belgium	2nd Field Artillery Brigade	
Smith, Charles Malcolm	Private				France	25th Battalion	
Smith, Claude Stanley	Private	Newcastle, NSW	22 Aug 1914	28	Gallipoli	1st Infantry Brigade	Served in the 1st Infantry Brigade at Gallipoli, landing on 26 Apr 1915, until wounded and hospitalised on 9 Aug 1915
Smith, Eric	Corporal				Gallipoli, France	27th Battalion	Died in 1916
Smith, Francis Henry		Marburg, Qld	13 Oct 1914	23	Palestine	2nd Light Horse Field Ambulance	
Smith, Frederick George		Maryborough, QLD			Gallipoli	2nd Battalion	Wounded at Gallipoli and died on 8 May 1915
Smith, Harold Edward Benjamin	Second Lieutenant				Western Front	19th Battalion	Killed in action on 8 Oct 1917
Smith, Harry Joseph Sinclair	Lance Corporal	Balmain, NSW	22 Aug 1914		Gallipoli	3rd Battalion	Killed in action on 23 Jun 1915 aged 20
Smith, Phillip James	2nd Lieutenant		16 Feb 1915		Gallipoli, Western Front	23rd Battalion	Awarded the Distinguished Service Order.
Smith, Romley Rutherford	Sergeant				France	3rd Pioneer Battalion	
Smith, Roy Alfred Walter	Lieutenant				France, Belgium	19th Battalion; Australian Naval and Military Expeditionary Force	Wounded in action and died on 15 Oct 1917
Smith, Syd	Driver				Gallipoli, France	1st Light Horse Regiment; 10th Field Artillery Brigade; 38th Battery Australian Field Artillery	
Smith, William Hamilton	Lance Corporal				France	32nd Battalion	
Smith, William Joseph	Gunner				France	7th Field Artillery Brigade	
Smithwick, Cedric Leslie			15 Jul 1915			12th Field Company Engineers	Served with his brothers Richard and Vernon in the 12th Field Company Engineers
Smyth, A. McVicker	Private	Sydney, NSW	24 Jun 1916	19	France	4th Infantry Battalion	
Smyth, Walter				40	Western Front	17th Battalion	
Smyth, William Ernest	Private		1 Jun 1916			4th Signal Troop Engineers	
Smyth, William Ernest	Private				Middle East	4th Light Horse Brigade	
Smythe, Percy					Egypt, Gallipoli, France		
Sommers, Jack	Private	Melbourne, VIC	19 Aug 1914	36	Egypt, Gallipoli, France		Served in the 1st Division, Australian Army Service Corps
Sorrell, J.					Mesopotamia	45th Battalion	
Spalding, Alfred Lawrence					Gallipoli		
Sparke, Edward	Lieutenant	Newcastle, NSW	25 Aug 1914	19	Egypt, Gallipoli and France	1st Battalion	Wounded at Bullecourt in May 1917
Sparkes, William		Brisbane	20 Aug 1914	32	Gallipoli, France	7th Field Artillery Brigade	
Spencer, Cecil Thomas	Trooper				Middle East	6th Light Horse Regiment	Captured in Mar 1918
Springthorpe, John William	Lieutenant-Colonel	Melbourne	19 Oct 1914	59			Senior Physician at the 2nd Australian General Hospital
Spurling, William A.	Corporal					50th Battalion	Died in 1917
Stanford, Edgar Roy	Trooper	Orange, NSW			Gallipoli	1st Light Horse Regiment	Wounded at Gallipoli on 1 Jul 1915 when he was shot in the leg. He died on 1 Aug 1915 as a result of complications from surgery to amputate his leg
Stead, John William	Private					12th Field Company; 25th Battalion	Stead gave his diary to Albert Easy in Apr 1916. They served together in the 12th Field Company Engineers.
Stephen, John C.	Sapper				Middle East	3rd Light Horse Brigade	
Stephens, Roy A.					France	14th Battalion	
Stevens, James Arthur	Sergeant	Northcote, VIC	2 Aug 1915		Egypt, France	58th Battalion	
Stevens, James G.	Gunner				Gallipoli, France	2nd Field Artillery Brigade; 5th Battery Australian Field Artillery	
Stevenson, Henry Stirling	Lance Corporal	Dubbo, NSW	22 Aug 1914	21		1st Australian Light Horse Brigade	
Stevenson, John E.	Captain				Gallipoli, France	1st Field Company	
Stevenson, John	Gunner				France	45th Battery Australian Field Artillery	
Stewart, Albert William John	Lieutenant Colonel				Gallipoli	8th Light Horse Regiment	
Stewart, Daniel Arthur	Private				France, Belgium	1st Pioneer Battalion	
Stewart, David L.	Lance Corporal		3 Jul 1915		France	31st Battalion	Served in the 31st Battalion, 114th Howitzer Battery, 25th Field Artillery Brigade, and 115th Howitzer Battery, 25th Field Artillery Brigade. He was killed in action on 22 Aug 1917
Stewart, Robert Joseph	Captain	Parkes NSW	28 Aug 1914	20	Gallipoli, France	2nd Battalion; 34th Battalion	Served in the B Company, 2nd Battalion, and later A Company, 34th Battalion
Stirling, Frank M.	Lieutenant				Gallipoli, France	29th Battalion	
Stobie, Graeme	Captain				Egypt, France	6th Battalion	
Stockdale, William	Lieutenant				Gallipoli, France		
Stockham, Sydney Clezy	Lieutenant				Gallipoli, France	2nd Machine Gunth Battalion; 27th Battalion; 5th Battalion	Died in action in 1918
Stone, David James					Egypt, France	9th Battalion	
Stone, Harold	Private		26 Oct 1917				Worked as an air mechanic in the Australian Flying Corps
Storey, William Tyson	Private				Egypt, France	10th Battalion	
Story, G.	Private				Egypt	ANZAC Mounted Division	
Story, Gordon			20 Aug 1914			4th Light Horse Regiment; 13th Light Horse Regiment	
Stratford, Stanislaus Augine					Gallipoli	2nd Light Horse Field Ambulance	
Strom, Christine Erica	Staff nurse	Ascot Vale	May 1917	25	Egypt, Greece, England	Australian Army Nursing Service. 66th (British) General Hospital 42nd (British) General Hospital 3rd Australian Auxiliary Hospital	
Stroud, Raymond Delbridge	Sapper				Egypt, Gallipoli, France, Belgium	5th Field Company Engineers	
Stuart, Gerald Eugene MacDonald	Lieutenant Colonel					3rd Light Horse Field Ambulance	
Stuart, Leslie Kemnitz	Private	Goulburn, NSW	23 Mar 1915	20	Gallipoli France		
Stuart, Peter Fitzalan MacDonald	Private	Rockhamption, QLD	1 Sep 1914	20	Gallipoli; Western Front, France	9th Battalion C Company	Killed in action during the Battle of Mouquet Farm on 4 September 1916
Sturdee, Alfred Hobart	Colonel				Egypt, Gallipoli, Lemnos, France, Belgium	Royal Australian Army Medical Corps	Commander of the 2nd Field Ambulance, Australian Imperial Force, at Gallipoli. He was mentioned three times in despatches and awarded the Commander of the Order of St. Michael and St. George in 1916.
Sturdee, Vernon Ashton Hobart, Sir	General	Frankston, Victoria			Egypt, Gallipoli, France		
Sturrock, Frank						16th Battalion; 38th Battalion	
Stutley, Sydney James	Corporal	Adelaide, SA	9 Sep 1915	23			Served in the 17th Battery, Australian Field Artillery
Sullivan, Edmund Joseph	Private				France	14th Battalion; 46th Battalion	Killed in action on 2 Sep 1916 at Vadencourt Wood
Sullivan, Eugene		Holdsworthy, NSW	20 Oct 1915	23	Belgium	9th Field Ambulance	Died on 17 Oct 1917 of wounds received in action
Sullivan, Henry Ernest	Private				Palestine	1st Field Squadron; 5th Light Horse Regiment	
Surplice, Alexander (Alex)	Lieutenant				Gallipoli	3rd Light Horse Regiment	
Surtees, Herbert	Private					2nd Battalion	
Sutton, A. F.	Lieutenant				Gallipoli, Western Front	5th Field Ambulance	
Sutton, Alfred	Colonel				Gallipoli, France	3rd Field Ambulance	
Swindells, William	Lance Corporal				Egypt, Gallipoli	1st Battalion	
Sykes, Robert Andrew	Private				France, Belgium	23rd Battalion, British Expeditionary Force	
Symes, Ernest A.					France	103rd Battery Australian Field Artillery	
Syvertsen, Chris							Served on HMAS Fantome
Taylor, Bessie A.	Staff nurse	North Sydney, New South Wales	3 Aug 1915		Western Front	Australian Army Nursing Service. 14 Australian General Hospital and Reinforcements	
Taylor, Charles Herbert	Private				France	34th Battalion	Wounded in Apr 1918 near Villers-Bretonneux
Taylor, Harold Burfield	Captain	Longueville, NSW	5 Aug 1915	25	France, Belgium	19th Battalion	Awarded the Military Cross in Apr 1917 for his bravery at Lagincourt and a Bar in Oct 1917
Taylor, Thomas	Sapper	Bowral, NSW	19 Jan 1916	19	France Belgium	30th Infantry Battalion; 5th Signal Company	
Tedder, James George	Lieutenant Colonel	Belmore, NSW	21 Aug 1914	51	Gallipoli		Present at the first landing of troops at Anzac Cove on 25 Apr 1915
Telfer, George Stanley	Lieutenant		20 Aug 1914			4th Light Horse Regiment; 59th Battalion	
Terrell, Frederick Leopold	Private					27th Battalion	
Tesch, Labracht Fredwick Charles	Sergeant				Gallipoli, France, Belgium	1st Battalion	
Theobald, William George Morley	Private				Gallipoli		Died at Gallipoli on 27 Apr 1915
Thirkell, George Lancelot A.	Captain				Gallipoli, France	Royal Australian Engineers	
Thirkell, Robert M.	Captain				France	12th Battalion	
Thomas, Arthur G.	Corporal				Western Front	6th Battalion	Killed in action on 8 Jun 1918 near Strazeele
Thomas, Follet Dawson					Gallipoli, France	12th Light Horse Regiment; 53rd Battery Australian Field Artillery	
Thomas, William Charles	Lieutenant				France	14th Battalion	
Thomas, William						4th Field Ambulance	
Thompson, Edgar Allan	Private				Western Front	21st Battalion	
Thompson, Francis Clarke	Captain				Egypt	2 Light Horse Field Ambulance; 2 Australian General Hospital; 14 Australian General Hospital	
Thompson, Lionel James "Len"	Sapper				France		
Thomson, Bruce Garie	Private				Gallipoli, France	3rd Field Ambulance; 3rd Squadron Australian Flying Corps	Killed on 8 Oct 1918
Thomson, David	Major					1st Battalion; 14th Battalion; 53rd Battalion	
Thomson, John 'Jack' William	Lance Corporal				Gallipoli	14th Battalion	
Thorn, Percival		South Brisbane, Queensland	7 Jun 1915	35		4th Light Horse Regiment	
Tiddy, Henry John	Major				Gallipoli	2nd Light Horse Regiment	
Tiegs, A. H.	Lieutenant				Gallipoli	28th Battalion	Wounded at Gallipoli
Titcher, Alan Keith	Lance Sergeant				Western Front	14th Field Ambulance	
Tivey, Edwin	Major General					8th Australian Infantry Brigade	
Todd, Arthur	Surgeon-Lieutenant				Pacific, Atlantic, New Guinea		Served on board HMAS Sydney. His diary includes an account of the sinking of SMS Emden
Tomlins, Fred Harold	Sergeant	Cobar, NSW	22 Aug 1914	23	Dardanelles, Egypt	1st Australian Light Horse Brigade	
Tongs, Allan Lorenzo	Sergeant		11 Aug 1915			12th Battalion	
Toohey, James	Gunner	South Brisbane, Qld	7 Sep 1915	19	France and Belgium	Field Artillery Brigade 3, Reinforcements 14	Two diaries were kept by James Toohey from 1 January 1916 to 30 September 1917. Toohey records his journey from Australia to Egypt on board the RMS Osterley and his war service in France and Belgium, including the Battle of Pozieres on 22 July 1916. Both diaries have been digitised and can be viewed online.
Toone, Albert Francis		Bowral, NSW				5th Light Horse Brigade	
Towers, John	Private		27 Jan 1916	44		19th Battalion	Injured by shrapnel in May 1917
Traill, Sydney R.	Lieutenant				France	1st Battalion	
Trangmar, Herbert S.					Gallipoli, France	24th Battalion; 57th Battalion	
Tranter, Elsie May	Staff nurse	Fyansford, Victoria	17 Aug 1916	30-31	England, France	Australian Army Nursing Service	
Treloar, John Linton	Lieutenant				Gallipoli, France	1st Squadron Australian Flying Corps	Commanded the Australian War Records Section from 1917, and a key figure in establishing the Australian War Memorial following the war. His diary was published in 1993.
Trevan, Robert B. C.	Lance Sergeant				Western Front	17th Garrison Battalion; 2nd Machine Gunth Battalion; 23rd Battalion	
Trousselot, Henry E.	Major				Western Front		
Tubb, Frederick Harold	Major	Longwood, VIC			Gallipoli, France	7th Battalion	Served with his brother, Captain Frank Reid Tubb, in the 7th Battalion. He was awarded the Victoria Cross for his service at Gallipoli, and later served in France. He died of wounds received at Pozières on 20 Sep 1917 aged 35.
Tuck, Stanley Thomas					Western Front	3rd Squadron Australian Flying Corps	
Tucker, Henry Frederick	Private	Wallangarra, NSW	14 Sep 1914	36	Gallipoli, Egypt, Palestine	6th Light Horse Regiment	
Tulloh, Ivan Maclean	Lieutenant				Middle East, Gallipoli, France	23rd Battalion	
Turnbull, John Henry Llewellyn	Driver				Gallipoli, Western Front	8th Battalion	
Turner, Donald Robert							
Turner, Harold Percy	Private				France	2nd Field Ambulance	
Turner, Lindsay Robert	Lieutenant				France	5th Division	
Turnley, William E.	Sergeant				Egypt, Gallipoli	1st Field Company	
Twist, Colin Claude	Bombardier				France, Belgium	18th Battery Australian Field Artillery	
Urquhart, Walter James	Major	Hamilton, Qld	5 Oct 1914	20	Egypt, Sinai, Palestine	Australian and New Zealand Mounted Division	Served in the Australian and New Zealand Mounted Division
Veness, Victor George	Captain				Gallipoli, Western Front	13th Battalion	Captured and held as a German POW at Strobenoor
Vick, Frederick Harold	Private	Rockdale, NSW	24 Jan 1916	23	France	5th Australian Field Ambulance	
Vickery, Hadden Kingston	Private				Gallipoli	3rd Light Horse Field Ambulance	
Vincent, James	Lieutenant				Gallipoli, France, Belgium	13th Battalion	
Vining, Arthur William		Sydney, NSW			France	1st Australian Siege Battery	
Vowles, Rupert T.	Sapper	Mudgee, NSW	22 Sep 1914	21	Egypt, Sinai, Palestine	1st Signal Squadron	Initially served on the HMAT Katuna and was discharged in Jan 1915. He re-enlisted pm 22 Aug 1915 and served in the 1st Signal Squadron, Anzac Mounted Division.
Walford, Dudley V.	Sergeant	Parramatta, NSW	23 Sep 1914	22	Gallipoli, Egypt		
Walker, Herbert A.	Sergeant					57th Battalion	
Wallace, Norman V.	Private					48th Battalion	
Wallach, Clarence	Captain				Gallipoli	19th Battalion	Served at Gallipoli until the evacuation in Dec 1915, and as a member of the rear-guard was one of the last to leave
Walsh, Leo John		Inverell, NSW	8 Oct 1915	24		1st Field Artillery Brigade	Wounded in action on 6 Sep 1917
Walther, Bernhardt Hermann	Captain	Murtog, VIC			Gallipoli, Palestine, France	11th Battalion	Part of the first landing at Gallipoli on 25 Apr 1915. He died of wounds received at Pozières on 25 Jul 1916
Walton, Frederick William						Royal Australian Navy	Served on HMAS Parramatta
Wanliss, Harold Boyd	Captain				Western Front	14th Battalion	Died in 1917
Ward, Eric Harford	Private	Bathurst, NSW	8 Oct 1914	24		1st Battalion	
Ward, Ernest Henry	Private	Sydney, NSW				4th Battalion	Served in the 4th Battalion, 23rd Reinforcement
Ward, Robert David	Private	Roma, QLD			Gallipoli	13th Battalion	Killed in action on 22 Aug 1915
Wardle, Priscilla Isabel	Staff nurse	Ballarat, VIC					Served in the Queen Alexandra Imperial Military Nursing Service Reserve
Warneford, Walter John		Randwick, NSW	26 Sep 1914	31	Gallipoli		
Watson, Ernest John	Private				France	26th Battalion	Wounded in action on 10 Jun 1918 near Morlancourt
Watson, Linda	Staff nurse		12 Mar 1917		Egypt, England	Australian Army Nursing Service	
Watson, William	Sergeant	Murwillumbah	16 Aug 1915	25	France	31st Battalion	Wounded on 28 Nov 1916
Weaven, Percy F.	Sergeant				Western Front	38th Battalion	
Webb, Ernest Glanville	Driver					Remount units	
Weeks, F. A.	Driver				Gallipoli	Royal Australian Army Service Corps	
Weingott, Samuel					Gallipoli	1st Battalion	
Weir, Frank Valentine	Major	Deniliquin, NSW	27 Sep 1914	36		1st Light Horse Regiment	
Wells, Donald Percival	Captain	Tighe's Hill, Newcastle	4 Sep 1915	20	France	30th Battalion	Served in the 30th Battalion until taken prisoner at Bullecourt on 11 Apr 1917
Wells, Henry L.					Western Front	Royal Australian Army Service Corps	
West, Arthur		Sydney, NSW			Egypt, Gallipoli	12th Light Horse Regiment	
Weston, Phillip		Potts Point	7 Sep 1914	28			
Wharton, Raymond T.	Private	Sydney, NSW	28 Apr 1916	19		36th Battalion	
Wheat, John Harrison	Able Seaman						Served on the submarine HMAS AE2 in the Dardanelles until captured and held as a POW from 1915 to 1918
Whettam, Eric		Lewisham, NSW	14 Jan 1915	19			Served in the 1st Composite Cavalry Regiment, Western Frontier Force, the 15th Field Artillery, and the 6th Field Artillery Brigade
White, Arthur Thomas	Colonel					3rd Division	
White, Thomas Alexander	Captain	Bendigo, VIC	9 Jun 1916	29	France, Belgium	13th Battalion	
White, Walter	Private				Middle East	7th Light Horse Regiment	
Whitelaw, John Stewart	Lieutenant				Egypt	7th Battalion	
Whyte, Elson Verco	Private					6th General Reinforcements	
Wilkie, Elliot Lloyd Gordon	Private				Egypt, Gallipoli	12th Field Artillery Brigade	
Wilkins, Gordon	Lieutenant				France	18th Battalion	Wounded in action at Bullecourt and lost his leg
Wilkinson, William (Bill)	Sapper				Western Front		
Williams, George D.	Captain					Royal Australian Navy	Served on HMAS Australia and HMAS Sydney
Williams, Horace Vivian Beresford 'Billy'					Gallipoli, Western Front	19th Battalion	
Williams, Percy Arthur	Private					49th Battalion	
Williams, Victor Owen		Plainby, QLD		18	France	10th Reinforcements, 47th Battalion; 45th Battalion	Wounded in action at the second battle of Dernancourt in April 1918
Williamson, Basil Bruce		Inverell, NSW	29 Mar 1915	20		18th Battalion	Killed in action at Gallipoli on 22 Aug 1915
Wilmot, Thomas R.							
Wilshire, Lionel		Melbourne, VIC	7 Sep 1915	29	France	35th Battalion; 36th Battalion	Killed in action on 31 May 1917
Wilshire, Sidney		Deniliquin, NSW	26 Feb 1915	24	Egypt, France	13th Field Artillery Brigade	Killed in action on 31 Jul 1917 at Ypres
Wilson, Arthur William	Private						
Wilson, Arthur	Sapper				France, Belgium		
Wilson, David Temple Palmerston	Lance Corporal				France	24th Battalion	
Wilson, Grace Margaret	Principal Matron	Brisbane, QLD			West Mudros and Lemnos, Greece, and Abbeville, France	Australian Army Nursing Service. No. 3 Australian General Hospital	
Wilson, J. S.	Lieutenant				Egypt, France	2nd Division; 4th Field Ambulance; Royal Australian Artillery	
Wilson, John Davison	Corporal	Portland, VIC	17 Feb 1916	40		37th Battalion; 39th Battalion	
Wilson, John	Private				France	30th Battalion	
Wilson, Neville T.	Sergeant				Gallipoli	1st Light Horse Regiment	
Wilson, Norman C. H.					Gallipoli	18th Battalion	
Wiltshire, Aubrey	Lieutenant Colonel	Armidale, Melb	24 Mar 1915	24	Egypt, Gallipoli, France, Belgium		Awarded the Military Cross and the Distinguished Service Order, and was created a Companion of St Michael and St George
Winter, Archibald Thomas	Sergeant				France, England	55th Battalion	
Wood, Bertie Arthur	Corporal	June, NSW	7 Feb 1916	22		56th Battalion	Served in the 56th Battalion, 2nd Reinforcements
Woods, Edward Thomas	Sergeant					6th Light Horse Regiment	
Woods, Harold Vynne	Sergeant					4th Field Ambulance	
Woolnough, Edgar Oliver	Private				France, Belgium	21st Battalion; 6th Battalion	
Worland, Victor Oswald	Private				Gallipoli, Lemnos	2nd Field Ambulance	
Worrall, Edgar Sydney	Corporal		17 Jun 1915		Gallipoli, France	24th Battalion	Claims in his diary to have fired the last shot at Lone Pine. He was killed in action in 1917
Worth, William		Wagga Wagga, NSW	29 Aug 1914	20		3rd Battalion	Gallipoli on 19 May 1915
Wray, Frederick William	Colonel Chaplain						Chaplain with the 4th Brigade
Wright, Adrian W.	Sergeant				France	13th Battalion	
Wright, Charles R.	Private				Gallipoli	8th Battalion	
Wright, F. C. W.	Corporal					1st Light Horse Regiment	
Wright, Leslie David	Private				Gallipoli, France	3rd Battalion	Wounded at Gallipoli on 27 Apr 1915 and carried to safety by John Simpson Kirkpatrick and his donkey Murphy
Wright, George James	Corporal				France, Belgium	10th Battalion	
Wright, Walter V.	Private	Wagga Wagga	14 Nov 1914	20	Gallipoli	4th Battalion	Awarded the Military Medal for bravery in Nov 1916
Wyatt, Henry Ernest	Corporal	Surry Hills, NSW			France	2nd Battalion	Wounded on 9 Apr 1917 and died two days later
Yates, William T.	Captain				Gallipoli, France	8th Battalion	
Yeaman, Wilfred Charles	Private					201st Machine Gun Company; 46th Battalion	
Young, Albert Victor	Sergeant				Gallipoli	7th Battalion	Died in Alexandria Hospital after being wounded on 8 May 1915
Young, David	Private	Miles, QLD	31 Oct 1916	21	France	49th Battalion	Died in action at Sailley-Le-Sec, France
Young, James McCall	Gunner	Diamond Creek, VIC	6 Mar 1917	30	France	11th Brigade Field Artillery	
Young, Norman McLaren	Sergeant					13th Battalion; 14th Battalion	
Young, Sydney B.	Private	Queanbeyan, NSW	9 Aug 1915	21	France, Belgium	4th Battalion	Served in the 4th Battalion, 12th Reinforcement
Young, William Campbell	Corporal				France	2nd Machine Gun Company	
