= David Gifford Croll =

Military doctor

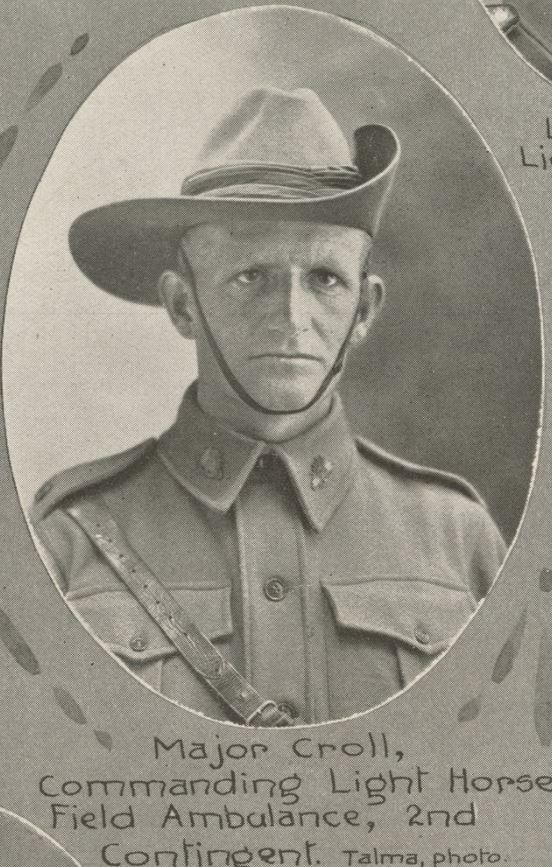
- Major Croll in c. 1914
- Born: 14 November 1885; Glasgow, Scotland
- Died: 4 May 1948 (aged 62); Sherwood, Queensland, Australia
- Military career
- Allegiance: Australia
- Branch: Citizen Military Forces; Australian Imperial Force
- Service years: 1910–1926; 1941–1944
- Rank: Colonel
- Commands: 112th Australian General Hospital; 2nd Light Horse Field Ambulance
- Conflicts: First World War; Second World War
- Awards: Commander of the Order of the British Empire; Colonial Auxiliary Forces Officers' Decoration; Mentioned in Despatches (2)

Colonel David Gifford Croll, CBE, VD (14 November 1885 – 4 May 1948) was an eminent doctor from Queensland, Australia, who served in the First and Second World Wars. He is remembered for his service at Gallipoli and in the Middle East during the First World War.

== Early life ==
Born in Glasgow, Scotland, on 14 November 1885, Croll emigrated to New Zealand with his parents before coming to Australia, aged 13. He completed his medical training at the University of Sydney, and while studying spent five years as part of the Sydney University Scouts, attaining the rank of warrant officer. Back in Queensland, Croll married a local Queensland nurse, Marian Winifred (Winnie) Payne, on 13 April 1912 at St Andrew's Presbyterian Church in Brisbane. Both were employed at the Brisbane Hospital.

== First World War ==
When war was declared in 1914, Croll, his wife Winnie and his brother John all enlisted within weeks of each other. Croll enlisted on 19 October, and was recommended for appointment as a major with the 2nd Light Horse Field Ambulance, having spent almost four years since qualification as a medical practitioner with the Australian Army Medical Corps. John also joined the 2nd Light House Field Ambulance, and Winnie served with the 1st Australian General Hospital, and departed for Egypt on board HMAT A55 Kyarra on 21 December 1914.

Croll embarked from Pinkenba Wharf, Brisbane, on board HMAT A30 Borda on 15 December 1914 as second-in-command of the 2nd Light Horse Field Ambulance. Once in Egypt, he and his medical staff quickly came to grips with the desert conditions, but found themselves deployed to the Gallipoli Peninsula in May, and witnesses to the failed August Offensive and the bloody end of the campaign. On 29 May, Croll wrote in his diary that "the whole landscape is bathed in moonlight & looks very beautiful but the din is awful, every bullet as it passes overhead makes more noise then the rifle which fires it." After the evacuation of the peninsula he was promoted to lieutenant colonel and given command of the 2nd Light Horse Field Ambulance as it supported operations in Egypt and Palestine. Croll was in charge of medical services and the logistics required to treat and retrieve wounded men under fire, in open warfare.

Sister Winnie Croll had remained in Egypt with the 1st Australian General Hospital during the Gallipoli campaign, but was invalided home with pleurisy in January 1916. Gifford also returned home for a period in 1917, reporting for duty on the hospital transport Euripides, which embarked from Suez on 22 January. After a short period of leave in Australia he embarked again from Sydney on 9 May and returned to the Middle East. For a short while he was assigned to command the Camel Field Ambulance, then in August 1917 was appointed Assistant Director of Medical Services (ADMS) for the Anzac Mounted Division.

Croll remained in the Middle East for the rest of the war, was promoted to colonel in April 1918 and after the armistice was appointed Deputy Director of Medical Services (DDMS) of the Australian Imperial Force in Egypt in March 1919. He finally embarked for home on the hospital transport Dunluce Castle on 17 July 1919. He was appointed a Commander of the Order of the British Empire in November 1919 for his services with military operations in Egypt.

== Later life and death ==
Upon his return to Australia, Croll resumed his medical practice in Sherwood, a western suburb of Brisbane, and became a well known local identity. He served again in the Second World War, and in 1941 commanded the 112th Australian General Hospital, which later became known as Greenslopes Military Hospital or Greenslopes Repatriation Hospital. He was also founder of the British Medical Agency, formed to assist doctors in their work. He died in 1948, aged 62.

== Legacy ==
Croll was a foundation member of the Sherwood RSL, and he and Winnie bequeathed their home to the Sub-Branch. In 1955, after Winnie's death in 1954, it was dedicated as the Croll Memorial Centre. The title transferred to new premises at Corinda in 1967, and the precinct extended in 1971. Since the early 1970s, the Croll Memorial Precinct at the Sherwood Indooroopilly RSL Sub Branch has been a local centre for commemorative services.

Croll's extensive collection of personal and official diaries, reports, memoranda and photographs are held in the collections of the State Library of Queensland.
