= Langford Wellman Colley-Priest =

Australian stretcher bearer (1890–1928)

- Born: September 1890; Glebe, New South Wales
- Died: February 1928 (aged 37); Balmoral, New South Wales
- Military career
- Allegiance: Australia
- Branch: Australian Imperial Force
- Service years: 1915–1919
- Rank: Private
- Service number: 6618
- Unit: 8th Australian Field Ambulance
- Conflicts: First World War; Western Front; Battle of the Somme; Battle of Racquinghem; Battle of Polygon Wood; Battle of Messines; Second Battle of Villers-Bretonneux; Battle of Mont Saint-Quentin
- Awards: Military Medal

Langford Wellman Colley-Priest MM (September 1890 – 11/12 February 1928) was an Australian stretcher bearer during the First World War for the 8th Field Ambulance. He was awarded the Military Medal for conspicuous gallantry on the Western Front in 1917. He survived the war, but later drowned in 1928, and his body is believed to have been eaten by a shark.

== Early life ==
Colley-Priest was born in Glebe, New South Wales, in September 1890 to George and Rose Colley-Priest. Prior to his embarkation for Egypt and deployment on the Western Front he resided with his parents in Neutral Bay and worked as a warehouseman. Colley-Priest was an Anglican.

== Service ==
Colley-Priest enlisted in the 8th Field Ambulance, part of the 8th Infantry Brigade of the Australian Imperial Force, on 19 May 1915 and embarked aboard HMAT Ascanius on 9 November, bound for Egypt and the Western Front. While serving, he was deployed at the Somme, Racquinghem, Polygon Wood, Messines, Villers-Bretonneux and Mont Saint-Quentin. In 1917, Colley-Priest was awarded the Military Medal. The recommendation for the award noted that he displayed:

... conspicuous gallantry devotion to duty whilst continuously carrying wounded from that post to Belawaarde Ridge under very heavy shellfire of all kinds, H.E., shrapnel and gas shells. On several occasions these men volunteered to carry urgent cases during a very intense period of heavy barrage. Throughout the action they showed great courage and devotion to duty, working continuously, and were responsible for saving many lives.

— First World War Honours and Awards (Gazetted),

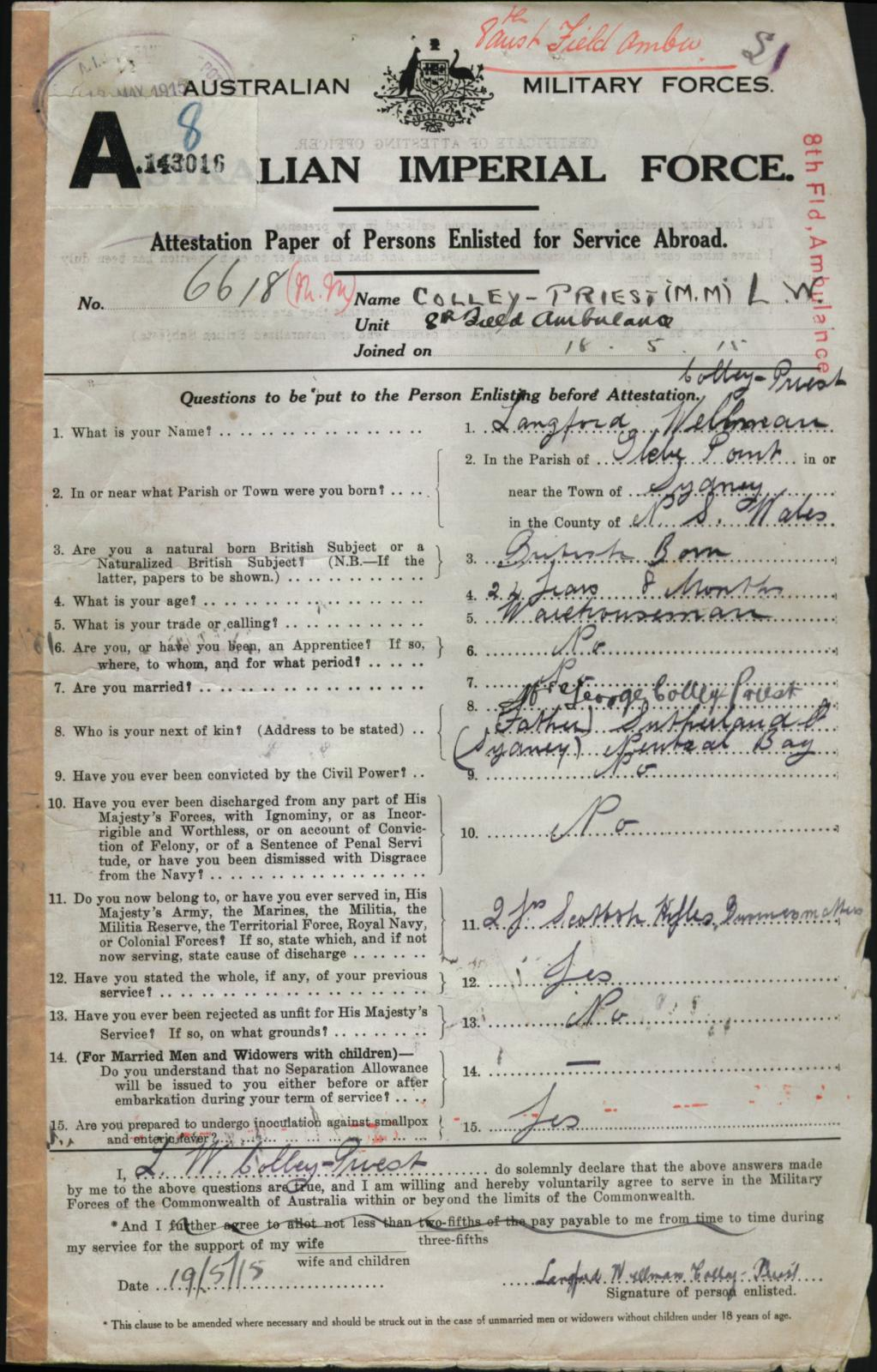
Colley-Priest's enlistment paper

Colley-Priest returned to Australian in 1919, was discharged on 3 August and awarded the 1914–15 Star, British War Medal and Victory Medal. for his war service. He later wrote the official history of his unit. Notable for its first-hand accounts of the front from the perspective of medical staff, he sold his war diary to the State Library of New South Wales in 1919 as part of their European War Collecting Project.

July 19th to July 22.
10 p.m.

News just came through that the Australians have taken two lines of trenches & captured a number of prisoners. A small batch of German prisoners just been marched by. About a dozen were brought in to our dressing station to have their wounds dressed. Their clothes I noticed were in good conditions. Number of Australian wounded keep coming in.
2 a.m.

Orders to move off to the trenches to do our bit, all very anxious to be in the "Straffe" (If we only knew) The Sergeant in charge of the party took the wrong road, & we did not arrive at the other dressing station till about 3:30 a.m. Was very tired, no sleep. The sky looked beautiful, one mass of light & star-shells etc. & the booming of guns etc. was deafening. We had to start stretcher bearing immediately. I was working all that day, 36 hours altogether. The sight at the Dressing Station was terrible, hundreds of wounded men were lying about, some of them not recognisable, they were so shattered & covered in blood. The bearers carried these men after being looked at by the doctor, to the Motor Ambulances, about ¾ mile away. The noise of the guns grenades & machine guns was terrific. No one can realise what the noise is like unless they are close by.

— Langford Wellman Colley-Priest,

== Death ==
Colley-Priest went swimming on either 11 or 12 February 1928, at Balmoral Beach, Sydney and was reported as missing on 13 February. On 14 February, a search team comprising the Balmoral local police and the New South Wales Water police were unable to find any signs of Colley-Priest. After the police search, a man observed a floating body in the distance and alerted the police to its presence. However, as the police approached the body a "huge object heaved out of the sea, grabbed the body, and disappeared." Newspapers at the time suggested suicide and that the body had been eaten by a shark. On 27 February, an arm washed up on the beach near Dobroyd Point and was assumed to be Colley-Priest's. A suitcase with his clothes and a note stating "Colley-Priest gone mad" were found on Balmoral Wharf. Members of the Mosman and water police retrieved a portion of a shirt believed to have been worn by Colley-Priest.
