= List of Australian diarists of World War I =

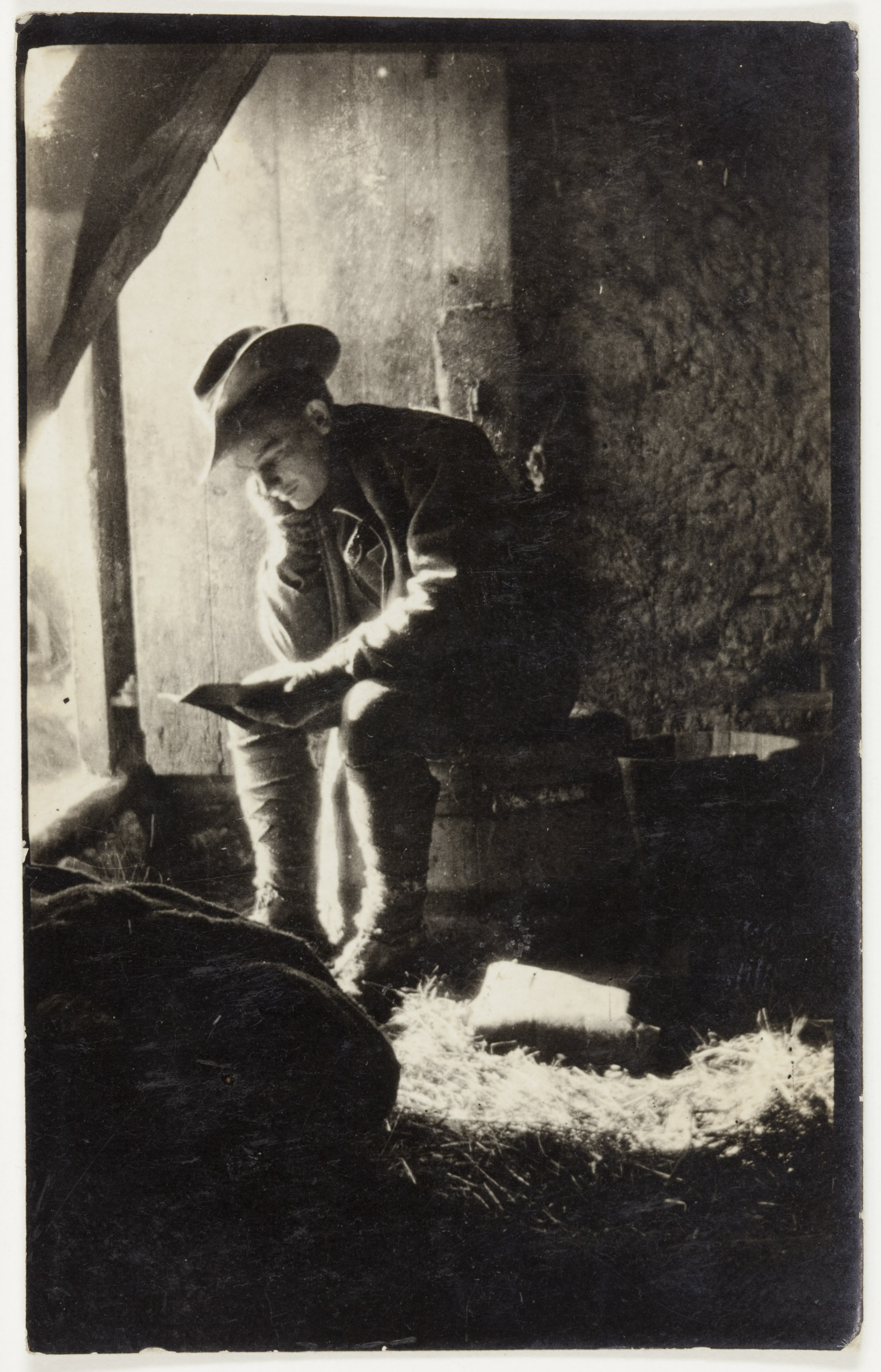
George Griffin, 53rd Battalion, with his diary

This is a list of Australian diarists of World War I including Australian servicemen and women, other Australians associated with the armed forces, and those who remained in Australia.

== Personal diaries ==
Many soldiers chose to keep a diary to document their personal experiences during the conflict. Regulations forbade the practice of individual soldiers keeping diaries in front line positions, yet the practice was apparently not uncommon. Individual diaries were officially forbidden because their capture by the enemy could yield valuable intelligence regarding unit identification, troop movements, etc. Individual diaries had to be portable and easily hidden. Many were approximately 9.5 by 15 centimetres (3.7 in × 5.9 in), which made them small enough to fit in a chest pocket. Next of kin were often listed. While the original diaries were handwritten, many soldiers later rewrote or typed their diary with some also publishing their work. Most diaries were kept by the soldier or their family. Military units were required to keep official records, which are also referred to as War Diaries. These records cover operations and planning, administration, and personnel. They were updated on a daily basis. These records are now at the Australian War Memorial.

=== Collecting the diaries ===
Many diaries were retained by the soldier or their family, however some of the surviving diaries are held in the collections of Australian cultural institutions including the Australian War Memorial, National Archives of Australia, State Library of New South Wales, State Library of Queensland, State Library of South Australia, and State Library of Victoria. The Australian War Memorial and the State Library of New South Wales were the first in Australia to attempt to collect war diaries on a large scale. The urge to collect these documents reflected contemporary understandings of history and research, which emphasised the role of primary sources and saw history as a science instead of an art. While the Library prioritised original documents over copies, the Memorial instead collected both original documents and copies.

William Ifould, Principal Librarian at the Public Library of New South Wales (later State Library of New South Wales), led a collecting drive which began within six months of the conclusion of the war. Ifould arranged for advertisements in newspapers across Australia offering to buy relevant papers for the Library, and also reached out to soldiers through the Returned Soldiers' Association of New South Wales. Efforts focused on diaries documenting training and active service, with accounts recorded "at the moment" or as soon after as possible considered the most useful.

The Memorial aimed to document the whole of Australia's war experience, initially focusing on published sources and the official records of the war. The Memorial began collecting personal documents including diaries in 1927. It was Arthur Bazley, historian Charles Bean's assistant at the Memorial, who suggested using the addresses recorded in the Roll of Honour Circulars to contact next-of-kin (and, later, servicemen and women directly) to ask for diaries and personal papers to be donated. John Treloar, Director of the Memorial, publicised the project and encouraged donations.

In total, 416,809 Australians enlisted for service. Only 500 diaries were collected by the Library, despite wide advertising, while approximately one in four soldiers or families contacted by the Memorial donated material.

== List of diarists ==
- List of Australian diarists of World War I (A-G)
- List of Australian diarists of World War I (H-N)
- List of Australian diarists of World War I (O-Z)

== See also ==
- Australian and New Zealand Army Corps
- Australian Naval and Military Expeditionary Force
- First Australian Imperial Force
- Imperial War Museum – holds a collection of diaries by Australians
- Military history of Australia during World War I
- World War I in literature
