= List of Australian diarists of World War I (H-N) =

This is part of the list of Australian diarists of World War I, covering diarists with family names beginning with "H" through to "N". List of A-G, O-Z.

Name	Rank	Town of Origin	Date of enlistment	Age at enlistment	Theatres	Unit	Notes
Haddow, Archibald	Lance Corporal	Kensington, VIC	29 Feb 1916	23		11th Field Company	
Hadfield, Arthur	Private	Tighes Hill, NSW	12 Jun 1916			1st Light Trench Mortar Battery; 1st Tunnelling Company	
Hadlow, Eric Clinton	Private	Warragul, VIC	7 Feb 1916		Egypt, France	2nd Machine Gun Company; 15th Machine Gun Company	Killed in action on 24 Sep 1917.
Hain, F.						5th Field Artillery Brigade	
Haines, George					France		Wounded on 10 Oct 1918
Haldane, Douglas	Private				Gallipoli, France	1st Battalion; 1st Field Company	
Hall, Albert Clement	Lieutenant				Gallipoli	8th Battalion	
Hall, Peter Riordan	Private	West Perth, WA	2 Nov 1914	29	Gallipoli		Served in the 2nd Stationary Hospital during the Gallipoli campaign, and the 7th Field Ambulance in France
Halse, Ernest George	Private		14 Jul 1915	19	German East Africa	6th Battalion	Served in the 6th Battalion, 10th Reinforcement
Ham, Alfred James	Private	Sydney, NSW	29 Sep 1915		France	2nd Battalion; 19th Battalion	Wounded in action on 23 Aug 1918
Hamilton, Patrick M.					Egypt, Sinai Peninsula	4th Light Horse Field Ambulance	
Hamilton, Robert Saunderson	Gunner	Mascot	13 Mar 1916	19	Egypt, France, Belgium		Served on the hospital ship Karoola, and later in the 10th Brigade, 39th Battery as a gunner
Hamilton-Kenny, Fred		Banningham, England			Pacific, New Guinea Fiji		Served in the Australian Naval and Military Expeditionary Force as a naval medical officer
Hamley, Charles					France, Belgium	10th Battalion	
Hamlyn, A. J.	Private					4th Battalion	Killed in action in 1917
Hammond, James	Private				France, Belgium	32nd Battalion	
Hampton, Reuben Lucius	Sergeant	Albert Park, VIC	18 Aug 1914	23	Gallipoli	5th Battalion	
Handfield, Harold E.	Corporal				France	36th Heavy Artillery Group	
Harding, Eric	Gunner				France	7th Field Artillery Brigade	
Harding, Richard Thomas	Sapper		12 Aug 1915			2nd Divisional Signal Company	
Hardy, Charles Briggs	Private	Newtown	12 Feb 1915	21	Gallipoli, France	19th Battalion	Wounded at the Battle of Fleurbaix
Hardy, Thomas Burton	Gunner					1st Field Ambulance	
Hardy, William Daniel	Private	Thirroul	9 Oct 1915	19	Egypt, France, Belgium	4th Field Ambulance	
Harford, David Bernard	Private	Albany, NSW			France	51st Battalion	Died on 31 Mar 1917 of wounds
Hargreaves, C.						1st Company, Australian Army Service Corps	
Hargreaves, Charles		Waverley; born in UK	2 Sep 1914	26	Egypt Senussi Campaign		Served in the 1st Division Transport as a driver
Harpley, Robert W.	Private				France	55th Battalion	
Harrigan, James E.	Private					30th Battalion; 8th Brigade	
Harris, Benjamin		North Fitzroy, Vict (English by birth)	3 May 1915	24	France, Belgium	8th Field Ambulance	
Harris, Clarence W.	Sergeant			24	Gallipoli, France	19th Battalion	Served with the 36th Signallers, 19th Battalion, and was awarded the Military Medal
Harris, Ernest W.					Gallipoli, France	3rd Machine Gun Company	Killed in action at Bullecourt in 1917
Harris, Herbert Henry	Corporal	Redfern	11 Aug 1915	42	France, Belgium	55th Battalion	
Harris, John Richards							Enlisted in the Australian Army Medical Corps. He was the Victorian Minister for public Instruction and Health from 1935 to 1942, and was knighted in 1937.
Harris, Keith					Pacific		Was onboard S.S. Matunga when it was captured, and was then a prisoner of war. He was 15 years old when captured.
Harris, Oliver H.	Private				Egypt, France	6th Field Ambulance	
Harris, Robert	Lance Corporal	Glen Innes	16 Aug 1914	20	New Guinea, France and Gallipoli	2nd Battalion; 9th Battalion; 11th Battalion; 12th Battalion	Served in the Machine Gun Section of the 2nd, 9th Retrieved 16 Jan 2014, 11th, and 12th Battalions
Harris, Willie	Private					16th Battalion	
Harrison, Hector J.	Captain				France, Belgium	37th Battalion	
Harrison, John	Private					3rd Field Ambulance	
Harrison, Selwyn	Major				France, Belgium, England	9th Field Ambulance	
Harslett, Cyril		Waverley	11 Mar 1915	20	Gallipoli and Egypt	14th Field Artillery Brigade	
Harvey, John Dean	Private					23rd Battalion	
Harvey, N. K.	Sapper				France	2nd Division	Awarded the Military Medal and Bar
Hassall, Frank Middleton		Cootamundra NSW	21 Jan 1915	18	Gallipoli, France	17th Battalion	Killed in action on 6 Jun 1916
Hawkes, Thomas Chudleigh		Wagga Wagga	4 Jul 1915	25	England		Served in military camps as a dentist
Hawkins, Geoffrey Oswald		South Perth, WA	6 Mar 1915	44	Western Front	28th Battalion	In 1919 he was appointed Survey Officer for the Commonwealth War Graves Commission and sent to Gallipoli
Hawkins, Harry					Egypt, France	1st Battalion	Wounded in action in July 1916 and again in May 1917
Hawkins, Samuel Hedley Hemming	Private	Brisbane, QLD	18 Sep 1914	17	Gallipoli, England, France	15th Battalion; 4th Pioneer Battalion	
Hawkins, W. L.	Lieutenant		22 Feb 1916			59th Battalion	
Hayne, Stanley	Sergeant	Mosman	4 Sep 1915	23	Egypt, France		Served in the 4th Australian Division, Transport Company
Hellmann, Arthur Langley		Manly	17 Aug 1914	22	Egypt, Gallipoli		Served in the First Division, Signal Company as a driver
Helmore, Porter Hickling					France	7th Field Ambulance	
Helms, William 'Bill' Bloomfield	Private				France	8th Light Horse Regiment	
Helsham, W. McD.	Colonel					Royal Australian Army Medical Corps	
Hemsley, Cecil A.	Private				France	48th Battalion	
Henderson, Lesly Walter	Lance Corporal	Mount Torrens, SA	13 Jul 1915			7th Battalion; 22nd Battalion	
Hendy, Percy Gordon	Driver				Gallipoli, France	6th Battery Australian Field Artillery	
Hennell, William Thomas Alma	Private	Petersham, NSW	3 Jun 1916	18	France	19th Battalion	Served in the 19th Battalion, B Company
Henwood, William James						12th Light Horse Regiment	
Herbert, P. C.	Private				Egypt, France	4th Field Artillery Brigade	
Hewitt, Hubert Deane	Gunner				Gallipoli, France		Wounded in 1917
Hewitt, Thomas Cotgrave	Captain				France	5th Light Horse Regiment; 53rd Battalion	Killed in action in France on 29 Jul 1916
Hickey, Leonard Roy	Sergeant				France	38th Battalion	
Hickman, Keith Morton	Sergeant					32nd Battery Australian Field Artillery	
Hickman, L.	Private					2nd Pioneer Battalion; 22nd Battalion	
Hicks, Les	Private		8 Jul 1915		France	5th Battalion	Served in the 5th Battalion until he was taken prisoner bear Bapaume, France on 12 Feb 1917
Hill, A. R.	Lieutenant					47th Battalion	Commanded the 47th Battalion
Hill, Harold David	Lance Sergeant	Brighton, VIC			France	23rd Battalion; 6th Light Trench Mortar Battery	
Hind, Reginald Arthur	Sergeant				Gallipoli, France	6th Field Ambulance	Awarded the Military Medal in recognition of his gallantry at Pozières while serving as a stretcher bearer, and Bar for his service and devotion to duty at Polygon Wood
Hine, Arthur	Sergeant	Randwick	18 Aug 1914	25	Egypt	3rd Battalion	
Hinsby, Montague		Penrith	1 Aug 1917	31			Chaplain in England and France
Hobbs, John Dudley	Sapper					1st Light Horse Regiment	
Hobson, Byron Charles					Gallipoli, France	13th Battalion	
Hobson, Frank Eliot					Gallipoli	New Zealand Mounted Rifles	
Hockey, Reg		Parkes	16 Jul 1917	22	On Euripides		Driver in the Australian Army Service Corps
Hocking, Francis M.	Sergeant					Australian Naval and Military Expeditionary Force	
Hodge, Percy		Manly	16 Oct 1915	21	Egypt, France, Belgium	1st Field Ambulance Brigade; 1st Australian Divisional Ammunition Column; 1st Australian Divisional Artillery Headquarters; 1st Australian Divisional Signal Company	
Hogan, Joseph Henry			23 Nov 1915	21		20th Battalion	Served with the 20th Battalion, 11th Reinforcement and received the Military Medal for bravery under fire at Lagnicourt on 15 Apr 1917. He was wounded in action twice, on 7 Apr 1918 and again on 3 Oct 1918
Holcomb, Gilbert L	Private	Gatton, Queensland	21 Nov 1914	29	Middle East, Dardanelles	2nd Light Horse Field Ambulance	
Holford, William George	Private	Euroa, VIC				46th Battalion	
Holland, Frank Bishop	Private				Gallipoli, France	27th Battalion	Died of wounds
Holland, George Harold	Corporal					27th Battalion	
Hollins, Leslie Henry			11 Sep 1916			2nd Motor Transport Company	Served in the 2nd Motor Transport Company as a driver
Holloway, Florence Elizabeth	Staff nurse	Ashfield, NSW	27 Aug 1917	43	England, Egypt	Australian Army Nursing Service	Served as a nurse in England and Egypt
Hollyhoke, Alexander David	Lieutenant	Brunswick, VIC			France	7th Battalion	
Holmes, William	Colonel				Gallipoli, France		Commanded the Australian Naval and Military Expeditionary Force which sailed from Sydney on HMAS Berrima on 19 Aug 1914. He was administrator of New Guinea after the German surrender until Jan 1915, and was then appointed commander of the 5th Infantry Brigade. He served at Gallipoli and in France, and was killed at Messines on 2 Jul 1917
Holt, Oliver	Lance Corporal	Grafton	10 Jun 1915	24	Gallipoli France & Belgium	3rd Australian Field Ambulance	
Holton, Alfred Edward						33rd Battalion; 26th Battalion	Captured in 1918 and held as a German POW
Homer, H. W.					Gallipoli	26th Battalion; 7th Field Ambulance	
Hood, Victor Charles					France	29th Battalion; 32nd Battalion	
Hook, Vivian Edward	Sapper					1st Field Company	
Hopwood, Walter Mizpah	Lance Corporal	QLD			Gallipoli, France	3rd Field Ambulance	Stretcher bearer
Horan, George		Glebe	24 Aug 1914	19	Egypt, Gallipoli, Greece, France, Belgium	1st Division Artillery	Served in the 1st Division Artillery, and received the Military Medal in recognition of his gallantry and devotion to duty at Pozières in 1916
Horder, Leslie Sydney	Private	Sydney, NSW			gallipoli, Sinai, Palestine	1st Light Horse Brigade	
Horton, Douglas David	Lance Corporal	Mittagong	5 Jul 1915	25	France	1st Battalion	Wounded on 7 Mar 1918
Houston, Matthew William	Sapper				France	4th Division Signals Company	
Hughes, Edmund Victor	Bombardier	Hamilton, NSW	17 Aug 1914	23	Egypt, Greece, Gallipoli, England, France	4th Battalion	Died of wounds, 2.15pm on 9 November 1917 at 5th General Hospital, Rouen
Hughes, Geoffrey Bell					Gallipoli, Sinai, France	5th Field Ambulance	
Hughes, Geoffrey Forrest		Sydney		21			Served in the Royal Flying Corps, and was awarded the Military Cross and Air Force Cross
Hughes, Roger Forrest	Captain	Elizabeth Bay, NSW	16 Mar 1916	26			
Hunt, George Thomas	Trooper					7th Light Horse Regiment	
Hunter, Albert Victor	Private				Palestine	Light horse units	
Hurley, Frank	Captain				France, Palestine		Official war photographer
Hurley, Percival	Sergeant	Gympie, Qld	26 Apr 1915	21	Egypt and France		Served in the Australian Army Medical Corps
Hurley, Victor	Lieutenant Colonel		20 Aug 1914				
Hutchinson, Ralph	Warrant Officer Class 2				Gallipoli, France	13th Field Ambulance	
Hutton, Arthur S.					Gallipoli	3rd Light Horse Regiment	
Hutton, John Thomas	Private	Carnsdale, NSW	2 Oct 1915	26	Egypt, France, Belgium	17th Battalion	
Hyder, Laurie	Private	Melbourne	17 Aug 1914	23	Gallipoli	6th Battalion	
Hyman, Arthur Wellesley	Major	Sydney	14 Nov 1914	34	Middle East	2nd Australian Light Horse Brigade	
Idriess, Ion Llewellyn	Trooper	Sydney, NSW			Gallipoli, Egypt, Palestine	14th Australian General Hospital; 5th Light Horse Regiment	
Iles, G. H.	Chief Petty Officer				Navy operations		Served on HMAS Melbourne
Irwin, Colin James	Private	NSW				Cyclist units	
Irwin, James P.	Private	Harkway Vict	20 Jan 1916	20	France	21st Battalion	Hospitalised with trench fever in June 1917
James, Britomarte		Melbourne			England		Joined the Women's Army Auxiliary Corps when it was established in 1917
Jamieson, Archibald Kerr		North Sydney	26 Aug 1915	22	Gallipoli	2nd Battalion	Served in the 2nd Battalion, A Company. He was injured during the landing at Gallipoli on 25 Apr 1915
Janssen, Carl Wilhelm	Lance Corporal	Ballarat, VIC				5th Battalion	
Job, Bernard Cedric		Sydney	23 Oct 1916	25	France	14th Field Engineers	Wounded in action on 24 Apr 1918
Joel, Hector Arthur					Western Front	Mechanical transport companies	
Johnson, Cyril Claude		Eldorado, VIC				5th Field Company	Awarded a Meritorious Service Medal in 1917 for his service at Ypres
Johnson, Leicester Grafton St. Clair	Private	Sydney, NSW			France	19th Battalion	
Johnston, Edgar Charles	Captain	Perth, WA			Gallipoli, France	28th Battalion; 24th Field Artillery Brigade; Royal Flying Corps	Awarded a Distinguished Flying Cross
Jones, Rupert Henry	Private	Hobart, TAS			Gallipoli	2nd Tasmanian Expeditionary Force	
Jones, W. J.	Sapper				France	4th Pioneer Battalion	
Joyce, John	Lance Corporal	Hawthorne, Vit	27 Jul 1915	28	Egypt, France, Belgium	7th Battalion	Wounded in action on 17 Aug 1916
Joynt, William Donovan	Lieutenant Colonel	Elsternwick, VIC			France	8th Battalion	
Jungwirth, Leslie Montus					France	10th Machine Gun Company	
Kay, Stuart	Major	NSW			Egypt	1st Australian General Hospital	
Keally, Clifford R.	Sergeant				Middle East	10th Light Horse Regiment	
Keating, Noel Michael	Corporal				France	13th Brigade	
Keatinge, Maurice Barber Bevan	Captain	Neutral Bay, NSW	20 Feb 1916	28	France	3rd Pioneer Battalion	Served in the 3rd Pioneer Battalion, B Company
Keighery, Francis Leonard "Frank"	Private				Gallipoli	24th Battalion	Died at Lone Pine on 11 Sep 1915
Kellaway, Frank Gerald	Lieutenant	Melbourne, VIC	6 May 1915		Gallipoli, France	22nd Battalion	Awarded the Military Cross for his service at Pozières
Kemp, William Joseph	Petty Officer	Albury, NSW					Served on HMAS Sydney
Kendall, Guy Basil	Trooper				Egypt	7th Light Horse Regiment	
Ker, William Innes					France	50th Battalion	
Kerr, Harold		Lorn, West Maitland, New South Wales	22 Aug 1914	19	Gallipoli		Served in the 1st Light Horse Regiment, and was killed in action on 7 Aug 1915
Kidd, Thomas Anderson	Major	VIC				10th Light Horse Regiment	
Kiel, William Ernest	Lance Corporal					6th Field Ambulance	
Kilgour, Arthur McPhail	Private	Melbourne, VIC			France	1st Field Ambulance; 2nd Battalion	
King, Dorian B. A.	Captain				Gallipoli	3rd Battery Australian Field Artillery	
King, Ernest George	Private	NSW			Gallipoli, France	19th Battalion	Wounded twice, once at Pozières on 26 Jul 1916 and a second time at Bullecourt on 3 May 1917
King, George B.	Lieutenant	Parramatta, NSW	26 Jul 1915	19	Egypt, France, Belgium	19th Battalion; 4th Battalion	
King, Henry Aubrey		Brisbane, QLD	21 Aug 1914	25	Gallipoli	2nd Australian Light Horse Regiment	Wounded in action at Gallipoli
King, James Clive Selwyn	Private	Richmond River, NSW	19 Jun 1915	20	France	1st Field Ambulance	Discharged on 19 Dec 1917 as medically unfit (shell shock)
King, Percy					Gallipoli	5th Light Horse Brigade	
Kinsmore, John William					France	50th Battery Australian Field Artillery	Kinsmore found the lost diary of German soldier Robert Winter at the village of La Motte and used it to record his own war experiences
Kirby, James							Served on HMAS Sydney
Kitchin, Alice E.	Sister	Amherst, Victoria	26 Sep 1914	41	Gallipoli, Egypt, France	Australian Army Nursing Service	Served at Harefield Hospital, Middlesex 1917-1918.
Kitchin Kerr, George Ernest	Corporal				Gallipoli	14th Battalion	Captured at Gallipoli and held as a Turkish POW for the remainder of the war
Knodler, Keith Jack	Warrant Officer	Brisbane, QLD				30th Squadron RAAF	
Knodler, Reginald John	Trooper					1st Light Horse Regiment	
Knuckey, Verner Gladders	Private	Cobar, NSW			Gallipoli, Egypt, France	2nd Squadron Australian Flying Corps; 8th Light Horse Regiment	
Kook, Thorvald Emil Lear	Private	Mount Gambier, SA			Western Front	43rd Battalion	
Krutli, H. E.						14th Battalion	Served in the D Company, 14th Battalion, 4th Infantry Brigade from Sep 1914 to Apr 1916.
Kunkler, Allan Richmond	Lieutenant	Lismore, NSW			Western Front	15th Battalion	
Kyle, A. B.					France	3rd Machine Gun Battalion	Killed in action at Passchendale in 1917
Laidlaw, Victor Rupert	Private	South Melbourne, VIC	18 Aug 1914	21	Gallipoli, France	2nd Field Ambulance	Wounded in action on 1 July 1916. Returned to Melbourne, March 1917.
Langford, Percival Charles William	Lance Corporal				Gallipoli	4th Light Horse Regiment	
Langtip, Henry 'Harry'	Staff Sergeant	VIC			Palestine	4th Light Horse Regiment	
Larkins, Stanley M.	Lance Corporal				Gallipoli	1st Division	
Laseron, Charles Francis	Sergeant		9 Sep 1914	26	Gallipoli	13th Battalion	Wounded on 27 Apr 1915
Laugher, Bruce	Sergeant		27 Feb 1915		Egypt, France	5th Battalion	Killed accidentally on 24 Sep 1916
Lawie, Charles	Private	Queensland	1 Mar 1915		Gallipoli, Western Front	25th Battalion	
Lay, Edward	Private	Bacchus Marsh, VIC			France	8th Battalion	
Lay, Percy	Major	Ballan, VIC			Gallipoli, Western Front	8th Battalion	
Lee, Charles		Newtown, NSW	17 Aug 1914	21	Egypt		Killed in action on 5 Jun 1915
Leece, Leonard Barton	Private				France	15th Battalion	
Lenehan, Joseph A.	Gunner				France	14th Field Artillery Brigade	
Lennie, John	Private				Gallipoli, Western Front	4th Field Ambulance	
Leppard, G.	Private				France	6th Battery Australian Field Artillery	
Leslie, Claude Shelton	Private				France		
Lewis, Athol Hugh	Lieutenant		28 Feb 1916		Belgium, France	3rd Artillery Division	
Lewis, James Ray		Bogan Gate, NSW; born Parkes, NSW	16 Aug 1917	19	France	17th Battalion	Wounded at Mont St Quentin on 31 Aug 1918
Lewis, Owen Gower	Lieutenant		3 Jan 1916		France	10th Field Company Engineers; 3rd Squadron Australian Flying Corps	Served with the 10th Field Company Engineers, then with the Australian Flying Corps. Killed in action on 12 Apr 1918.
Liddelow, Aubrey	Captain				Gallipoli	59th Battalion; 7th Battalion	
Liebert, Sidney		South Yarra	21 Jan 1916	19	France	3rd Australian Division Signals Company	
Lillie, George	Private	Killarney, Qld	24 Aug 1914	19	Gallipoli	9th Battalion	Served in the D Company, 9th Battalion, 3rd Division, 1st Australian Division, and was killed in action on 5 May 1915
Lillywhite, Reginald Guy	Warrant Officer				Gallipoli, Egypt	3rd Field Ambulance	
Lindsell, James		Auburn	11 Dec 1914	20	Gallipoli, France	13th Battalion	Wounded in action three times, once at Gallipoli on 21 Aug 1915, once at Bullecourt on 15 May 1917, and once at Polygon Wood on 26 Sep 1917
Linney, Thomas Edward					France, Belgium	4th Division	
Linton, Noel Glendinning	Sapper	Chatswood, NSW	1 May 1916	26	France and Belgium	15th Field Company Engineers	
Lister, Eyre George	Major				France		
Little, Edy		Vaucluse	27 Apr 1918	31	France	35th Battalion	
Lloyd, Griffiths	Gunner				France	110th Howitzer Battery	
Locane, Andria					France	1st Machine Gunth Battalion	
Logie, J.					France	2nd Australian General Hospital	
Long, William Booth					France	5th Battalion	
Lord, Cecil Clyde		Kadina, SA				3rd Light Horse Regiment	
Lorimer, William	Lance Corporal	Hawksburn, VIC	1 Dec 1914		Egypt, Gallipoli, France	5th Battalion	
Loubet, Eric William	Sapper	Sydney, NSW				2/1 Field Company; 6th Division	
Louch, T. S.	Brigadier				Gallipoli, France	51st Battalion	
Loud, Frank Thomas	Private	Melbourne, VIC			Gallipoli, Western Front	9th Battalion	His diary is written in the diary kept by Thomas Walter Ford, also from the 9th Battalion, who was killed in action on 25 Apr 1915. Loud, having lost his pack in the landing, found Ford's abandoned pack.
Loughran, H. G.	Major				Gallipoli	Royal Australian Army Medical Corps	
Lowden, Cedric L	Lieutenant				France	36th Battalion	
Lowe, John Henry	Sapper	Brisbane	23 Mar 1917	40	Palestine	5th Light Horse Brigade	Served in the 5th Signal Troop, 5th Light Horse Brigade
Loxton, Hilda Mary		Inverell, NSW			France	Red Cross	
Luders, Edward Michael	Lance Corporal	Nundle, via Tamworth	17 Aug 1914	20	Egypt, France, Belgium	1st Battalion	Awarded the Military Medal in 1917 in recognition of his service at Pozières
Lycett, William Dalton	Lance Corporal		12 Sep 1914	24		4th Field Ambulance; 15th Light Railway Operating Company	
MacArty, Humphry Warren Barker		Broken Hill, NSW	24 Aug 1914	28	Egypt and Gallipoli	10th Battalion; 50th Battalion	
Macdiarmid, Allan M.						45th Battalion	
MacDonald, James		Melbourne	9 Sep 1914	36	Gallipoli, France	5th Battalion	Wounded at Gallipoli on 26 Apr 1915. He was sent to France on 14 Jun 1918 as a war artist.
Macfarlane, Stuart Robertson						1st Light Horse Regiment	
MacGillycuddy, Arthur Orpin	Lieutenant				Gallipoli	6th Light Horse Regiment; Australian Flying Corps	
Mack, David Leonard						10th Battalion	
Mackay, Alan Brownell						24th Battalion	Served with his brother Colin in the 24th Battalion. Both Alan and Colin were killed in action in 1918
Mackay, Alexander Sutherland	Gunner	Brisbane, QLD			France, Belgium	8th Field Artillery Brigade	Died of bronchial-pneumonia on 18 Dec 1918
Mackay, Herbert Douglas	Gunner	Townsville, QLD	22 Oct 1917	37		Field Artillery Brigade, Reinforcement 34	
Mackay, Murdoch Nish	Major	Bendigo, VIC			France	22nd Battalion	Killed in action at Pozières on 5 Aug 1916
Mackenzie, Charles Kenneth							Served on HMAS Melbourne
Mackenzie, Ronald					Gallipoli, Lemnos, Egypt and France		Killed in action on 30 Jul 1916
MacKenzie, William Kenneth Seaforth	Colonel					19th Battalion; 23rd Battalion	
Mackie, George Norman	Warrant Officer	Prospect, SA			Egypt, Lemnos, France	27th Battalion	
Mackie, Ralph	Gunner				France	10th Battery Australian Field Artillery	
MacLeod, George	Private				Western Front	47th Battalion	Killed in action on 8 Jun 1917 at Messines
MacNamara, John Patrick	Private	Coffs Harbour	2 Feb 1916	19	Palestine		Served in the 1st Light Horse Brigade and later the No. 1 Squadron, Australian Flying Corps. He was awarded the Military Medal in 1917
Macrae, Gordon	Sergeant	Dorrigo	10 Sep 1914	25	Gallipoli, Egypt	6th Australian Light Horse	
Maddox, John Owen	Private	Eastwood	11 May 1915	19	Gallipoli, France	1st Field Ambulance	Served in the 1st Field Ambulance as a stretcher bearer
Maddren, Eric	Private						
Magill, Eric Lindsay	Corporal	VIC			Gallipoli	7th Light Horse Regiment	Wounded at Gallipoli and died on 20 Oct 1915
Maguire, J. T.					France	8th Battalion	
Major, Eric Latimer						50th Battalion	
Makinson, Frank	Private	Neutral Bay	4 Sep 1914	35	Gallipoli, France	13th Battalion	Served in the 13th Battalion, 4th Brigade. He was killed in action on 29 Aug 1916
Mallinson, Randolph	Lieutenant					22nd Battalion	Captured at Herleville in Aug 1918
Marlan, Robert Francis 'Spike'	Colonel	Goondah, NSW				Royal Military College, Duntroon	
Marsh, Henry James Marsh	Private	Brisbane, QLD	19 Apr 1916	21	Ship	47th Battalion	Killed in action on 12 Oct 1917
Marshall, James I.	Private	Darlinghurst	6 Mar 1916	18	France and Belgium	53rd Battalion	Hospitalised with trench fever in July 1917.
Martin, Edwin John	Private	McMahons Point, enlisted in Goulburn	22 May 1916	44	France	20th Battalion	Served in the 20th Battalion, 5th Brigade, 2nd Division
Martin, Jack		Mosman	14 Aug 1914	23	New Guinea	Australian Naval and Military Expeditionary Force	
Maschmedt, Laurie P					France	12th Machine Gun Company	Killed in action at Zonnebeke
Maskew, Frank	Driver				Egypt, France	14th Field Artillery Brigade	
Mason, Arnold	Lance Corporal				France	14th Field Company	Captured at Fromelles and held in POW camps at Dulmen, Minden and Diepholz
Mason, Charles Francis					France	1st Australian Divisional Ammunition Column	
Mason, David Mitchell	Private				Egypt, France	15th Field Ambulance; 8th Field Ambulance	
Mason, Harry Pidcock					France		
Masters, Harold W.					Egypt, France		Reported missing in action on 6 May 1917
Matheson, Leslie Norman	Sergeant					16th Battery Australian Field Artillery	
Matthews, Arthur Edward					France	3rd Battalion	
Matthews, Harley	Private	Fairfield, NSW	26 Aug 1914	25	Gallipoli		Wounded on 3 Aug 1915, he received a special mention for conspicuous gallantry
Maudsley, Henry F.					France	29th Battalion	
Mawby, Robert Noel	Gunner				France	12th Field Artillery Brigade	
May, Leonard	Major	Singleton, NSW			France, Belgium	Royal Australian Army Medical Corps	
McAnulty, Cecil Anthony	Private	Ballarat, VIC			Gallipoli	3rd Battalion	Killed in action at Lone Pine in Aug 1915
McArthur, Edwin V.	Private				Western Front	3rd Pioneer Battalion	
McAulay, Roderick	Private	Waverley NSW	18 Aug 1915	34			
McCardel, Charles Edward	Second Lieutenant	Wangaratta, VIC			Egypt, France, Belgium	7th Battalion	
McCarthy, Herbert Joseph	Captain				Gallipoli	6th Battalion	
McCarthy, Sidney		Redfern, NSW	3 Nov 1914	23	Egypt, Gallipoli, Middle East	7th Light Horse Brigade	Served in the 7th Light Horse Brigade, A Squadron
McClean, Hector Morgan	Private	Chatswood, NSW		20	France, Belgium	9th Field Ambulance	Served in the 9th Field Ambulance as a stretcher bearer and orderly
McClintock, George Thomas		Parramatta, NSW	14 Sep 1914	21	France, Gallipoli	[[13th Battalion (Australia)	13th Battalion]] 17th Battalion
McConnan, Edgar Don	Sergeant				France	4th Field Ambulance	
McCrae, Geoffrey Gordon	Major	Hawthorn, VIC			Egypt, Gallipoli, Cyprus, France	60th Battalion; 7th Battalion	Wounded at Gallipoli, and later killed in action on 19 Jul 1916 at Fromelles. Christ Church in Hawthorn, Victoria has a stained glass window commemorating him
McCrae, Lionel Oscar		Carlton, VIC	12 Mar 1915	26	France, Belgium	18th Battalion	Hospitalised on 10 Nov 1916 with trench fever and discharged one month later. On 9 Jul 1917 he was awarded a Military Medal for bravery. He was killed in action on 20 Sep 1917
McDonald, Hugh	Sapper	VIC			France	4th Divisional Signal Company; 10th Divisional Signal Company	
McDougall, Wallace Andrew	Lieutenant	NSW			Australian Flying Corps	Machine gun units	
McDowell, Arthur Francis	Sapper				Palestine	Royal Australian Engineers	
McGee, Henry Xavier		Redfern, NSW				1 Anzac Topographical Section; 20th Battery [[Royal Australian Artillery	Australian Field Artillery]]; 5th Field Artillery Brigade; Royal Flying Corps
McGilvray, A. W. E. 'Archie'					Western Front	13th Battalion	
McGrath, John					Egypt, Gallipoli	4th Light House	
McGrath, William	Major	VIC				8th Light Horse Regiment	Entries in the diary of Major Thomas Harold Redford after his death in Aug 1915 are attributed to McGrath, who served with Redford
McGregor, John F.					Gallipoli, France	18th Battalion	Wounded in action at Bullecourt, 22 Aug 1916
McGregor, William Hodge	Trooper				Gallipoli		Killed on 5 Jun 1915
McGrigor, A. M.	Lieutenant				Gallipoli	British Army	
McGuigan, Edward Thomas	Private				Western Front	3rd Pioneer Battalion	
McHenry, Robert Wellesley					Gallipoli, France	2nd Field Artillery Brigade	
McInnis, Ronald Alison	Lieutenant	Mackay, QLD			Gallipoli, France	2nd Field Company; 26th Battalion; 53rd Battalion	
McIntyre, G. K.	Corporal				France	British Army	
McIntyre, W. M.					Gallipoli, France	23rd Battalion	
McKay, Leslie James	Sapper	Waverley, NSW	1 Sep 1915	18	France and Belgium	15th Field Company Engineers	Wounded on 30 Sep 1918
McKenzie, Hugh W.	Lieutenant				Gallipoli, Western Front	1st Machine Gun Company	
McKenzie, W. G.					Gallipoli, France	9th Battery Australian Field Artillery	
McKenzie, William Henry	Private				France	3rd Battalion	Died in 1917
McKenzie, William	Lieutenant Colonel					4th Battalion	Awarded the Military Cross
McKerlie, Robert					France	[[13th Battalion (Australia) 13th Battalion]]	Stretcher bearer
McKern, Howard Taylor	Corporal	Arncliffe, NSW			Gallipoli	4th Battalion	Wounded at Lone Pine on 6 Aug 1915 and died on 15 Aug 1915 of his wounds aged 22
McKinley, Thomas John	Private	Greenponds, TAS	8 Mar 1915	32	Egypt, Dardanelles, France	8th Battalion	Served in the 8th Battalion, 6th Reinforcement and was killed in action on 11 Sep 1916
McKinnon, Eric George	Corporal					30th Battalion	
McLachlan, B. H.	Lieutenant					18th Battalion; Australian Naval and Military Expeditionary Force	
McLean, Archibald							Awarded the Military Cross in 1918. Before the war, Dr McLean was the chief medical officer and bacteriologist on Douglas Mawson's Australasian Antarctic Expedition
McLean, Godfrey James	Sergeant		14 Feb 1916			11th Field Artillery Brigade; 12th Field Artillery Brigade	Served as a gunner with the 11th and 12th Field Artillery Brigades. He was awarded the Military Medal
McLean, James Joseph	Private	Darlinghurst, NSW	14 May 1915	21	Gallipoli, France	25th Battalion	Wounded in action on 5 Aug 1916
McLennan, John Hattam	Lieutenant				Gallipoli	35th Battalion; 5th Battalion	
McLennan, William Rae	Private	Sandford, VIC			France, Belgium	2nd Machine Gun Battalion	
McLeod, Jack	Private		10 Sep 1915			4th Light Horse Regiment; 7th Battalion	Died of wounds received in action on 18 Apr 1918
McMichael, J.					France	37th Battalion	Died in 1917
McMillan, Arthur	Corporal				Egypt, Gallipoli, France	23rd Battalion	
McMillan, Florence Elizabeth	Sister	Sydney	26 Apr 1915	33	Middle East	Australian Army Nursing Service	Served as a nurse in the Middle East
McMillan, Gilbert							
McNair, Livingstone	Lance Corporal				France	17th Battalion	Evacuated from the front in July 1916 suffering from shell shock
McNamee, Edward Michael	Private				Gallipoli, France	9th Battalion	
McNicol, Norman G.	Lieutenant				France	37th Battalion	
McPhee, Charles C.					France	4th Machine Gun Battalion	Captured at Dernancourt
Mcphee, J. E.	Sergeant				Gallipoli, France	4th Field Ambulance	
McPhee, James Edmond	Sergeant		3 Oct 1914		Gallipoli, France	4th Field Ambulance	Awarded the Military Medal
McPherson, Athol Cluny	Private	Nangeela, VIC			Gallipoli	5th Battalion	Killed in action on 19 Aug 1915 aged 34
McPherson, Donald	Sergeant				Gallipoli	2nd Division	
McRae, John Duncan	Private	Newtown	31 Oct 1916	22	Belgium	19th Battalion	Died on 19 Sep 1917 after being wounded the previous day
McWhae, Hector	Bombardier				Gallipoli, France, Belgium	2nd Field Artillery Brigade	Wounded in Dec 1917 at Passchendale
Meads, John Hartley	Captain				France, Belgium	18th Battalion	
Meggy, Douglas Acland	Private	Paddington, NSW			France	3rd Battalion	
Meggy, Percy Arthur	Driver	Sydney, NSW					
Melly, Oscar		Haymarket	9 May 1916	43	France	1st Medium Artillery	Served in the 1st Medium Artillery, 3rd Reinforcements, Heavy Truck Motor Battery
Melville, Charles Patrick	Bombardier				Western Front	18th Battery Australian Field Artillery; 6th Field Artillery Brigade; Royal Australian Army Medical Corps	
Mercer, Harold	Corporal	Collaroy	17 Apr 1917	35	France	1st Battalion	
Merrington, Ernest Northcroft	Colonel Chaplain	Newcastle			Gallipoli	1st Light Horse Regiment	
Middleton, William Frankfort		Cootamundra, NSW	13 May 1915	32	France and Belgium	3rd Battalion	Served in the 3rd Battalion, 7th Reinforcement
Miles, Thomas Alfred		Hobart, TAS			Gallipoli, France	12th Battalion; 3rd Light Trench Mortar Battery	
Millar, Christopher Kenneth		Bondi, NSW	22 Aug 1914	19	Gallipoli, France		Wounded in action at Gallipoli, and later awarded the Military Cross
Millard, Reginald Jeffrey	Colonel	Newcastle, NSW			Gallipoli	1 Auxiliary Hospital; 1st Casualty Clearing Station; 1st Field Ambulance; Royal Australian Army Medical Corps	
Miller, Alex Halden							Co-organiser of the Gilgandra Cooee Recruitment Mar
Miller, William Richard	Lance Corporal				France	50th Battalion	
Milson, Stewart	Captain	QLD			Gallipoli	4th Battalion	Killed in action on 6 Aug 1915 at Lone Pine, Gallipoli
Minahan, Michael	Private	born Milparinka NSW	17 Sep 1914	25	Egypt and Palestine	6th Light Horse Regiment	Served in the 6th Light Horse Regiment, C Squadron
Mitchell, Geoffrey Arthur Nevett	Corporal	Ballarat, VIC				13th Balloon Company	
Mitchell, George Deane	Major	Caltowie, SA			Gallipoli, France	10th Battalion; 48th Battalion	
Mitchell, Keith James	Private	South Yarra, Victoria	12 Jan 1915	21	France, Egypt, Dardanelles	6th Field Ambulance	
Molony, Frank Henderson	Private	Woollhara	9 Jul 1915	20	France, Belgium	1st Field Ambulance	
Monaghan, Charles Vincent		Nowra	20 Jul 1915	30	Egypt, France	Australian Army Medical Corps	Served as a stretcher bearer in the Australian Army Medical Corps
Monk, Cecil George	Private	Erskinville, NSW	24 Oct 1916	23	France	54th Infantry Battalion; 2nd Machine Gun Battalion	Hospitalised in Oct 1917 with trench fever
Moon, Eric	Private	Kogarah	31 Oct 1916	21	France and Belgium	19th Battalion	Served in D Company, 19th Battalion
Moore, Arthur John		Milson's Point, NSW	6 May 1915	28	Egypt	8th Field Ambulance	Served as a stretcher bearer with the 8th Infantry Brigade, 8th Field Ambulance Sections B and C. He was wounded in action in Apr 1917 and awarded the Military Medal for bravery
Moore, Charles	Driver				France	57th Battalion	
Moore, George R.	Bombardier				Gallipoli	1st Division; 2nd Brigade	
Moore, George					Gallipoli		
Moore, Ralph Ingram	Captain	Summer Hill, NSW	1 Sep 1914	26	Gallipoli, France	3rd Australian Infantry Battalion	Served in the 3rd Australian Infantry Battalion and was awarded the Military Cross in recognition of his service at Gallipoli. He was also awarded the Distinguished Conduct Medal, 1914-15 Star Retrieved 17 Jan 2014, British War Medal and Victory Medal, and was killed in action on 7 Oct 1917
Moorhead, Eric Wallace	Lance Corporal				Gallipoli, France	5th Battalion	
Morgan, Raymond D.	Private				Gallipoli	7th Light Horse Regiment	
Morgan, Roger	Lance Corporal				France	1st Field Ambulance	
Morrice, Nellie Constance	Head Sister	Sutton Forest, NSW	21 Nov 1914	33	Egypt, England, France	Australian Army Nursing Service	
Morris, Alfred Prichard Kington	Private	Armadale, Vict	18 Aug 1914	21	Gallipoli, Egypt, Sinai and Palestine		
Morris, Basil Moorhouse	Major General	Melbourne, VIC	3 Jun 1915	26		36th Heavy Artillery Group	
Morris, Ernest Newby	Petty Officer	VIC				Royal Australian Navy	Served on HMAS Huon
Morris, Leslie	Private	Haberfield	6 Dec 1915	29	Egypt, Palestine	1st Australian Light Horse Field Ambulance	Served as a stretcher bearer with the 1st Australian Light Horse Field Ambulance
Morris, Percy		Helensburgh, NS	31 May 1916	33	France		Wounded in action at the Battle of Mont St Quentin on 31 Aug 1918 while serving as a runner, and received the Military Medal for his services
Morris, Robert Irvine	Private	Pyrmont, Sydney	22 Oct 1915	18	Egypt, France	18th Battalion	Served in the 18th Battalion, 8th Reinforcement and was awarded the British War Medal and Victory Medal. He was killed in action on 26 Aug 1916
Morrison, George Hugh	Corporal					45th Australian Infantry Battalion	
Morrison, James Arthur	Sapper	Deniliquin, NSW				1st Divisional Signal Company	
Morrison, Matthew Edward	Trooper				Western Front	13th Light Horse Regiment	
Mortimer, C. R.							HMAT Karoola
Mott, Arthur Ernest Percival	Lieutenant	Moonee Ponds, VIC	28 Jan 1915	19		1st Squadron Australian Flying Corps	
Moulden, R. E.	Private		18 Aug 1914		Egypt	1st Australian Light Horse Field Ambulance	
Moule, C.					France	50th Battalion	Died in 1917
Muir, Frederick Warren	Private	Unanderra, NSW	22 Aug 1914	21	Gallipoli	1st Battalion	Died on 28 Nov 1915 of wounds received at Gallipoli
Mulder, Harold John	Captain				Egypt, Middle East	8th Light Horse Regiment	
Munro, Edward Charles	Lance Corporal	Burpengary, QLD	10 Sep 1915	19		5th Field Ambulance	
Munro, Thomas Denholm	Driver	Malvern, Vict	5 May 1916	24		6th Field Artillery Brigade	Wounded in action on 11 Aug 1918
Murphy, Thomas Samuel	Sergeant	Camperdown	17 Aug 1914	31	Gallipoli		Wounded in action on 8 Aug 1915
Murphy, Clarence R.						Light horse units	
Murphy, George Francis	Lieutenant Colonel				Gallipoli	18th Battalion	
Murphy, T.					Gallipoli, Flanders, Somme	5th Battalion	
Murray, Ernest	Sergeant	Berry	27 Aug 1914	33	Egypt, Gallipoli, France, Belgium	1st Field Company; 14th Field Company	Awarded the Military Medal and bar in 1917. He was wounded in action on 30 Jan 1918
Murray, James Nicholas	Private	Armidale, New South Wales	10 Feb 1915	30	Egypt, Gallipoli	25th Battalion, D Company	
Murray, John A.	Private				France	11th Field Ambulance	
Murray, Leslie Harold	Sergeant	Beechworth, VIC				4th Light Horse Regiment	
Nainby, Frederic Arthur Fullerton	Lance Corporal	Merrylands, NSW	7 Jul 1915	35	Egypt, France	Infantry Brigade 4, Field Ambulance 5, Reinforcement 8	
Nash, John Brady	Lieutenant-Colonel	Sydney	19 Oct 1914	57	Egypt	Australian Army Medical Corps	
Neal, Frederick William	Lance Corporal	Maryborough, QLD	19 Aug 1914	22	Gallipoli	9th Battalion	Wounded at Gallipoli
Neander, Charles George	Corporal	Gosford, NSW					Captured and held as a German POW
Neaves, Henry Herbert	Lieutenant	Wollongong, NSW			Gallipoli, France	45th Battalion	
Neil, Henry "Harry" Alexander	Private				France		
Neill, Clive Lander	Gunner	Sydney, NSW			France	7th Field Artillery Brigade	Served with the Electrical and Mechanical Mining and Boring Company
Neville, Ethel Alice Flett	Staff nurse		2 Mar 1915			Australian Army Nursing Service	
Newman, Ernest William	Petty Officer	Cambridge, England	29 Apr 1912	40		Australian Naval and Military Expeditionary Force	Served in the Australian Naval and Military Expeditionary Force, and later with the Royal Australian Navy on HMAS Australia
Newton, L. M.	Captain				France	12th Battalion	
Newton, William Thomas	Major				Egypt, Western Front	14th Field Ambulance; 15th Field Ambulance	
Nicholson, John James	Private		24 Oct 1916		Western Front	23rd Battalion	
Nicholson, William Henry	Private	'Kennelworth', Bonshaw	19 Aug 1915	18	Egypt, France	3rd Battalion	Served in the 2nd Company, 3rd Battalion
Nimmo, Percy Ernest	Lieutenant	North Adelaide, SA	9 Sep 1915	30	France, Belgium	48th Battalion	
Nixon, James Harold Claude	Private	Orbost, VIC	10 Nov 1915	25		Royal Flying Corps	
Nixon, Robert Rex	Private	Neutral Bay Sydney	1 May 1915	18		4th Battalion; 56th Battalion; 61st Battalion	
Nixon, Rupert Charles	Private	Neutral Bay Sydney	24 Sep 1914	21	Gallipoli, France	13th Battalion	Served in the 13th Battalion as a signaller. Wounded in action on 3 May 1915 at Gallipoli
Nixon, Victor Rodney	Private	Neutral Bay Sydney	31 May 1915	21	France		Wounded in action on 2 Apr 1917
Noble, Robert Jackson	Sergeant	Sydney, NSW	20 Oct 1915	21		5th Machine Gun Battalion	
Noble, Vivian Henry William	Corporal	Enmore, NSW	Aug 1914	20	Gallipoli, France	3rd Battalion	
Norgard, William	Sapper	SA				4th Division	
North, Cedric Roy	Lance Corporal	Bundaberg, QLD	26 Aug 1915	21	France	25th Battalion	Diary covers 22 February 1917 until 19 March 1918. Cedric was killed in action 2 days later.
North, Charles Vincent Rice	Private	Rockhampton, QLD				11th Field Ambulance	
Nott, Lewis Windermere	Captain	Bundaberg, QLD				Scottish Forces	
Nunn, J. A.	Captain				France	3rd Pioneer Battalion	
