= Healesville =

- Town
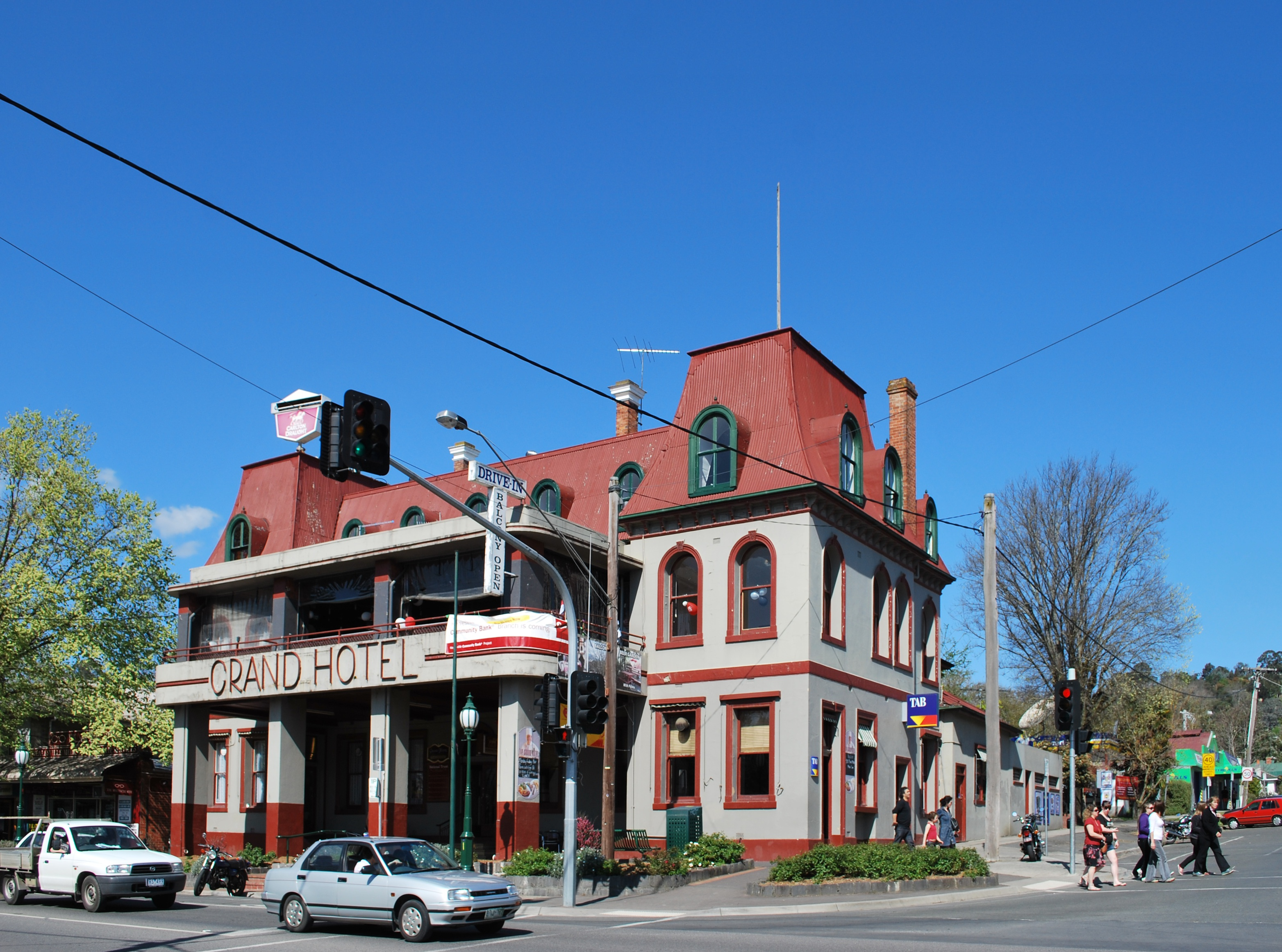
- The Grand Hotel at Healesville

- Interactive map of Healesville
- Coordinates: 37°39′22″S 145°30′50″E
- Country: Australia
- State: Victoria
- LGA: Shire of Yarra Ranges
- Location: 64 km (40 mi) NE of Melbourne CBD; 23 km (14 mi) NE of Lilydale
- Established: 1864

Government
  - State electorate: Eildon
  - Federal division: Casey

Area
  - Total: 142.1 km^{2} (54.9 sq mi)
- Elevation: 97 m (318 ft)

Population
  - Total: 7,589 (2021 census)
  - Density: 53.406/km^{2} (138.32/sq mi)
- Postcode: 3777
- Mean max temp: 19.2 °C (66.6 °F)
- Mean min temp: 8 °C (46 °F)
- Annual rainfall: 1,020.1 mm (40.16 in)
Localities around Healesville
Chum Creek	Toolangi	Fernshaw
Dixons Creek Tarrawarra	Healesville	McMahons Creek
Coldstream Gruyere	Badger Creek Woori Yallock	Don Valley Warburton

Healesville is a town in Victoria, Australia, 64 km north-east from Melbourne's central business district, located within the Shire of Yarra Ranges local government area. Healesville recorded a population of 7,589 in the 2021 census.

Healesville is situated on the Watts River, a tributary of the Yarra River.

The outskirts of Healesville is home to a wildlife sanctuary, called Healesville Sanctuary.

== History ==
Traffic to the more distant Gippsland and Yarra Valley goldfields in the 1860s resulted in a settlement forming on the Watts River and its survey as a town in 1864. It was named after Richard Heales, the Premier of Victoria from 1860–1861. The post office opened on 1 May 1865. The town became a setting off point for the Woods Point Goldfield with the construction of the Yarra Track in the 1870s.

=== Heritage listings ===
The following places in Healesville are listed on the Victorian Heritage Register:

- Healesville Court House (former), 42 Harker Street, repurposed as the local tourist information centre
- Healesville railway station complex, 38 Healesville-Kinglake Road
- Maroondah Water Supply System, in Healesville and other locations in the region

== Present ==
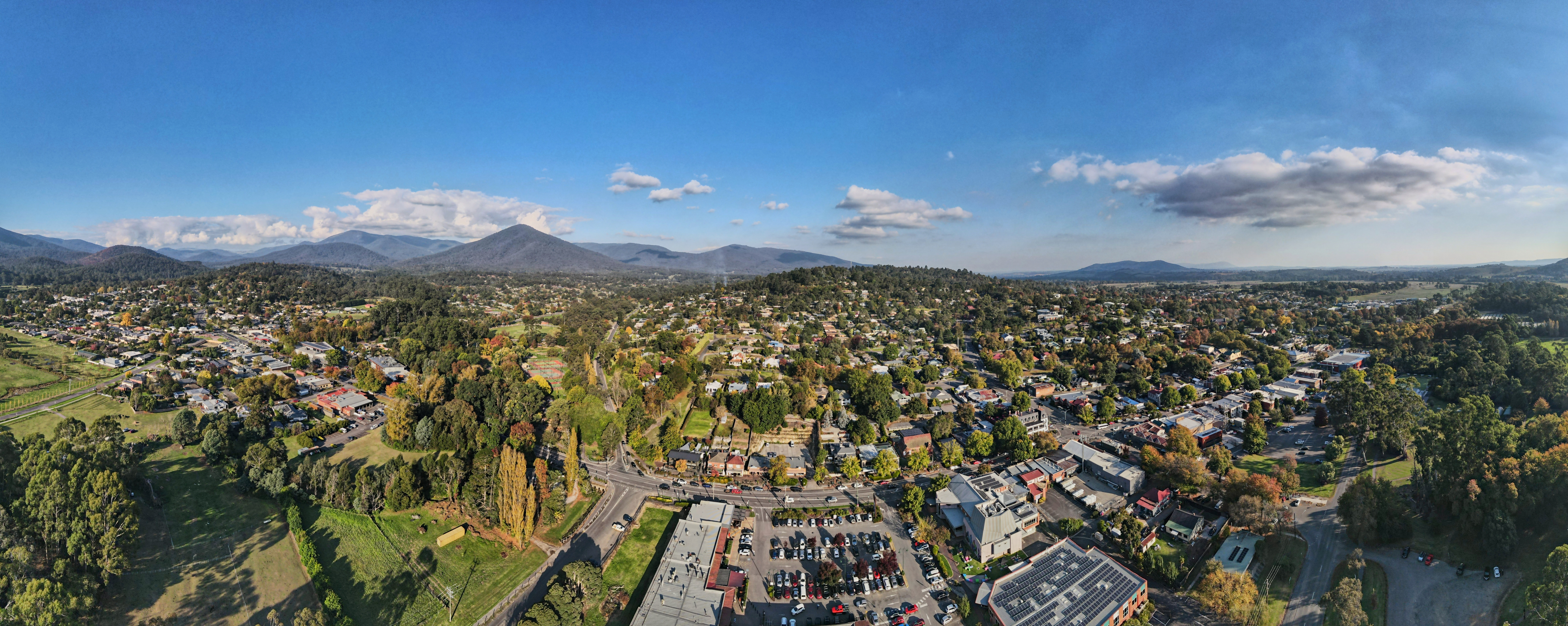
Healesville panorama, shot in April 2022

Healesville is known for the Healesville Sanctuary, a nature park with hundreds of native Australian animals displayed in a semi-open natural setting and an active platypus breeding program.

The Yarra Valley Railway operates from Healesville Station on every Sunday, most public holidays and Wednesday to Sunday during school holidays.

Schools in Healesville include the Healesville Primary School, St Brigid's Catholic primary school, the rural Chum Creek Primary School, Badger Creek Primary School, Healesville High School and Worawa Aboriginal College, an Aboriginal school whose former students include Australian Rules Footballer David Wirrpanda.

Much of what is now Healesville lies on the ancestral land of the Wurundjeri people. An Aboriginal reserve known as Coranderrk, set up in 1863, was located just south of the main township.

Industries in and around Healesville include sawmilling, horticulture, tourism and viticulture.

Healesville has an active CFA (Country Fire Authority) volunteer fire brigade established in 1894. The Healesville Rural Fire Brigade was formed in 1941, then disbanded and membership amalgamated with the Healesville Urban Fire Brigade in 1985. The amalgamation of the Chum Creek Rural Fire Brigade with the Healesville brigade occurred in 1996. The Healesville Fire Brigade now operates a main and a satellite station with members from both the Healesville and Chum Creek areas.

Healesville is the southern terminus of the Bicentennial Heritage Trail, which, at 5,330 km (3,310 mi), is the longest trail of its type in the world. The northern end of the trail is at Cooktown, Queensland, a town 328 kilometres (204 mi) north of Cairns.

== Population ==
At the time of the 2021 census, there were 7,589 people in Healesville.

- Aboriginal and Torres Strait Islander people made up 3.2% of the population.
- 79.5% of people were born in Australia. The next most common countries of birth were England 5.4% and New Zealand 1.7%.
- 90% of people spoke only English at home.
- The most common responses for religion were No Religion 55.8%, Catholic 13.7% and Anglican 8.9%.

== Sport ==
The town has an Australian rules football team, the Healesville Football Club, competing in the Yarra Valley Mountain District Football League.

Healesville has a cricket club, the Healesville Cricket Club, which competes in the Ringwood and District Cricket Association junior and senior competitions.

Healesville has a tennis club, the Healesville Tennis Club, which competes in the Eastern Region Tennis junior and senior competitions.

Healesville has a picnic horse racing club, Healesville Amateur Racing, which holds around seven race meetings a year with the Healesville Cup meeting in January.

The Healesville Greyhound Racing Club also holds regular greyhound racing meetings at the Healesville Showgrounds and Sporting Complex on Don Road.

Golfers play at the course of the RACV Country Club on Yarra Glen Road.

Healesville has a soccer team known as Healesville Soccer Club that plays in the Victorian State League 4 East.

== Notable people ==
- William Barak – an Aboriginal artist and Wurundjeri elder who spent much of his life at Coranderrk Station, near Healesville
- Edith Coleman – a naturalist and nature writer who completed her studies of pseudocopulation on native orchids from her house 'Goongarrie' in Healesville
- Gordon Collis – an Australian rules football player for Carlton Football Club; Brownlow Medalist in 1964
- Lex Lasry – a Supreme Court Judge
- Kelvin Moore – an Australian rules football player for the Richmond Football Club
- James Wandin (1933–2006) – a Wurundjeri ngurungaeta and Australian Rules footballer with St Kilda
- Joy Murphy Wandin – a Wurundjeri elder
- Jessie McHardy White (1870–1957), army matron
- David Wirrpanda – a former Australian rules footballer
- Patrick Wolfe (1946–2016) – an Australian historian and social anthropologist

== Tourism ==
Healesville has been a tourist destination since the 1880s, with the Grand Hotel built in 1888, and the 60-room Gracedale House in 1889.

A Tourist and Progress Association was created in the 1920s. The association published "Healesville, The World-famed Tourist Resort", listing over 40 beauty spots and 20 hotels and guest houses.

The construction of the Maroondah Dam in the 1920s brought several hundred workmen to Healesville. Their departure and the onset of the 1930s depression exposed Healesville's restricted range of industries. Timber and tourism were not stable enough for sustained and reliable growth. Notwithstanding the depression, the 1930s saw increased motor tourism (partly bypassing Healesville) and decreased railway patronage. Only 10% came by rail at Easter 1934. Tourism was still active but a local newspaper commented that Healesville would be "heaps better off calling itself the good-time town instead of the world-famed-tourist-resort—that's got whiskers on it".

In modern times Healesville has become a centre for tourism based around the wine and food industries of the Yarra Valley, with attractions including Healesville Sanctuary, Badger Weir Picnic Area, Yarra Valley Railway, Healesville Organic Market, numerous cafes and restaurants, and volunteer-run events such as the Healesville Music Festival, Open Studios, and the Yarra Valley Rodeo.

The Memo, a centre for community arts and cultural activities, was built in 1924 as a soldier's memorial hall.

== Film and television ==
The Internet Movie Database has Healesville and its environs as the filming locations for a number of films and TV programs: the Australian TV series Young Ramsay (1977), Felicity (1979), the natural history TV series Life on Earth (1979), Frog Dreaming (1986), the Australian TV short film Harry's War (1999) and Killer Elite (2011).

== Climate ==
Climate data for Healesville (1927–1990)
Month	Jan	Feb	Mar	Apr	May	Jun	Jul	Aug	Sep	Oct	Nov	Dec	Year
Mean daily maximum °C (°F)	26.0 (78.8)	26.4 (79.5)	23.9 (75.0)	19.0 (66.2)	15.9 (60.6)	12.3 (54.1)	12.2 (54.0)	13.4 (56.1)	16.0 (60.8)	18.9 (66.0)	22.1 (71.8)	24.0 (75.2)	19.2 (66.6)
Mean daily minimum °C (°F)	11.2 (52.2)	11.7 (53.1)	10.6 (51.1)	8.5 (47.3)	6.4 (43.5)	4.4 (39.9)	4.2 (39.6)	5.2 (41.4)	6.2 (43.2)	7.8 (46.0)	9.4 (48.9)	10.6 (51.1)	8.0 (46.4)
Average precipitation mm (inches)	56.9 (2.24)	67.7 (2.67)	64.1 (2.52)	90.5 (3.56)	96.0 (3.78)	81.6 (3.21)	86.5 (3.41)	99.1 (3.90)	93.0 (3.66)	106.3 (4.19)	90.2 (3.55)	85.5 (3.37)	1,006.5 (39.63)
Average rainy days	4.8	4.8	5.5	7.8	9.9	10.0	11.2	12.2	10.2	10.2	8.1	7.4	102.1
Source: Monthly climate statistics

== Gallery ==
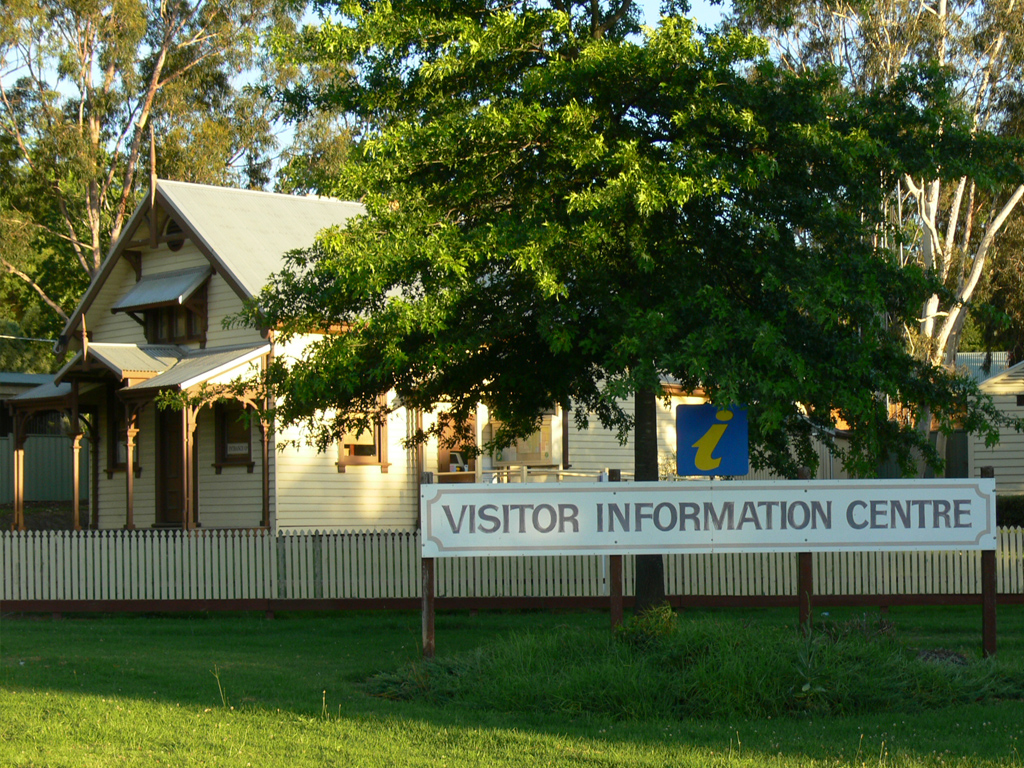
Healesville Visitor Centre

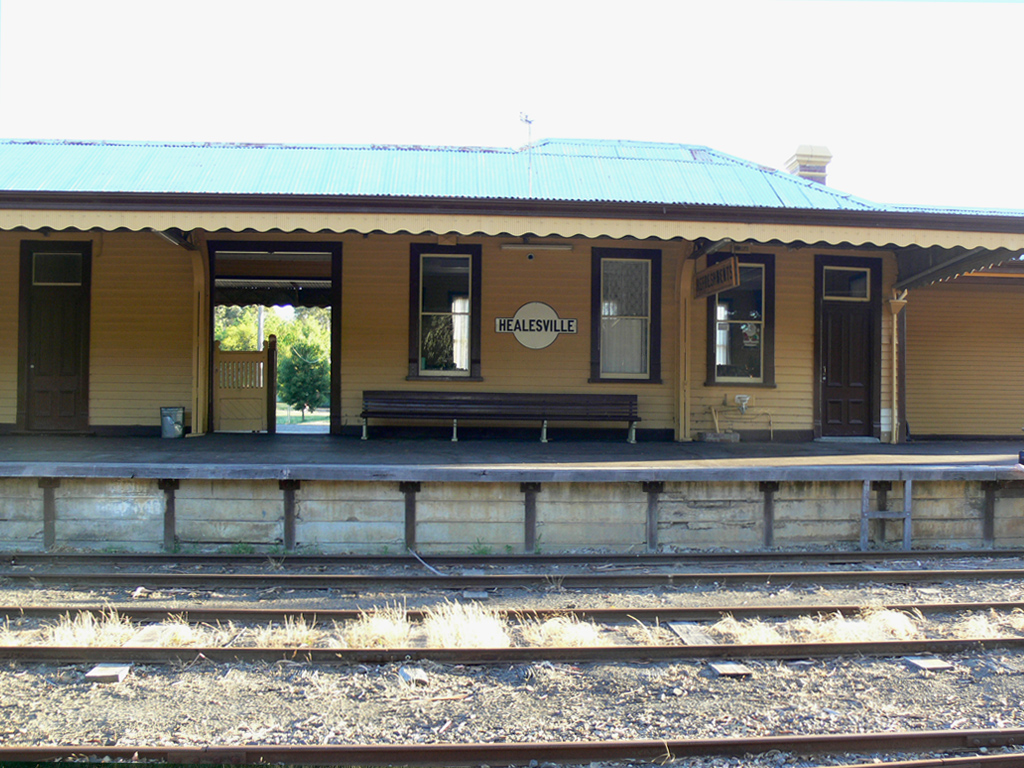
Healesville Railway Station

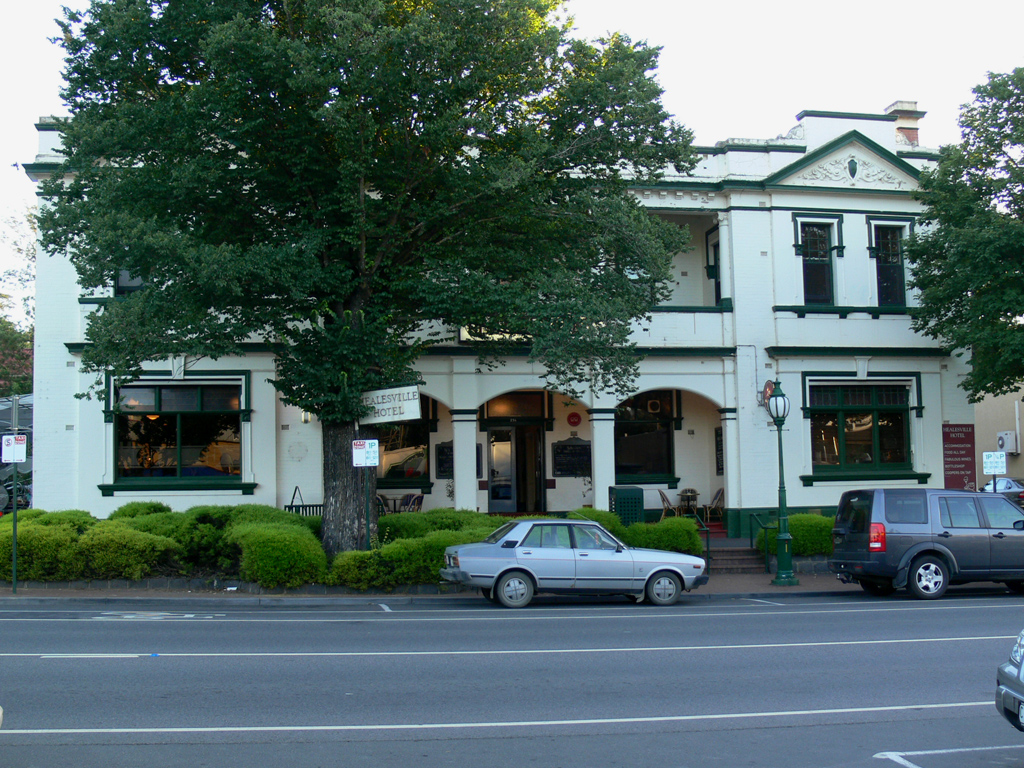
Healesville Hotel

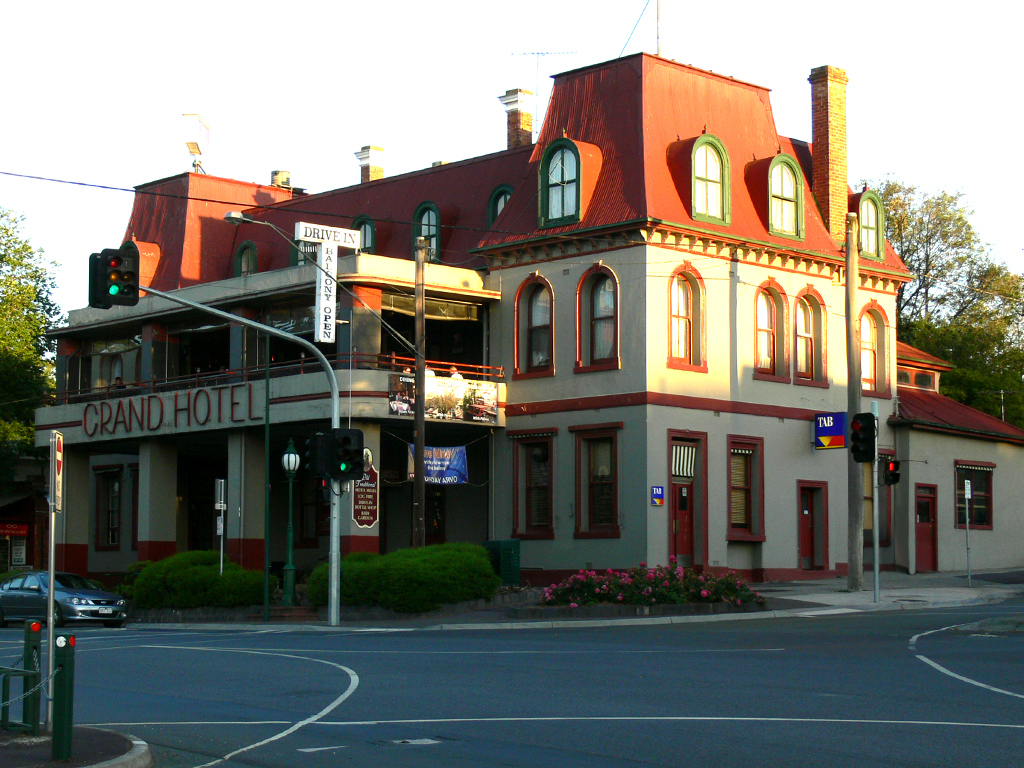
Grand Hotel

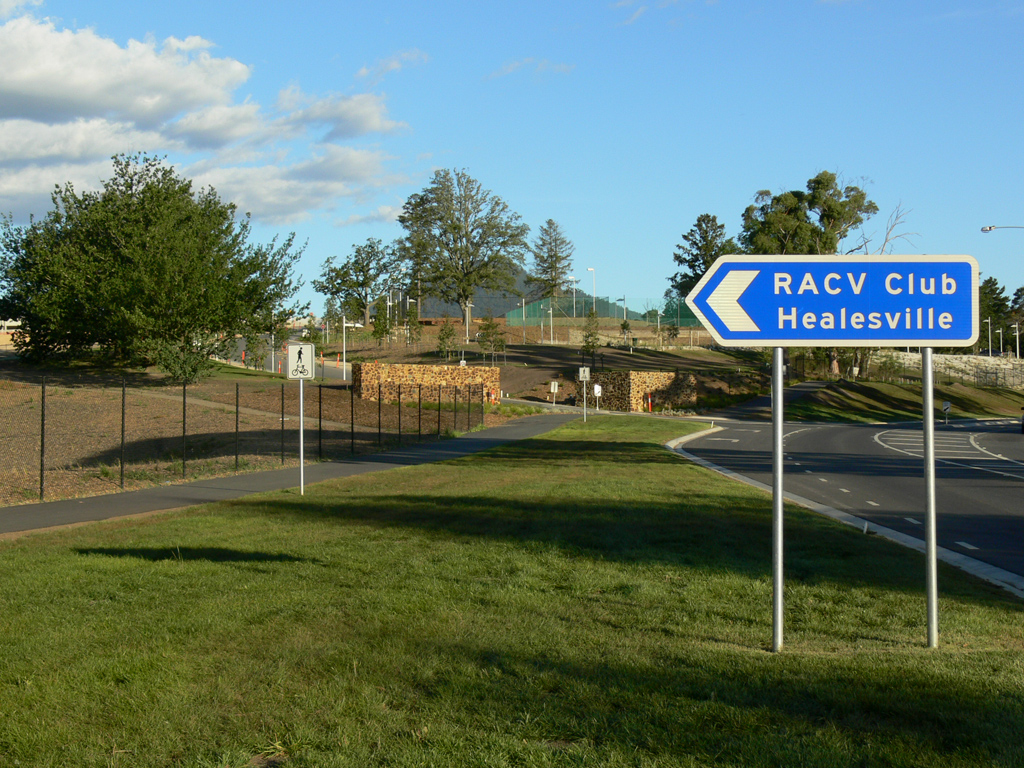
RACV Club

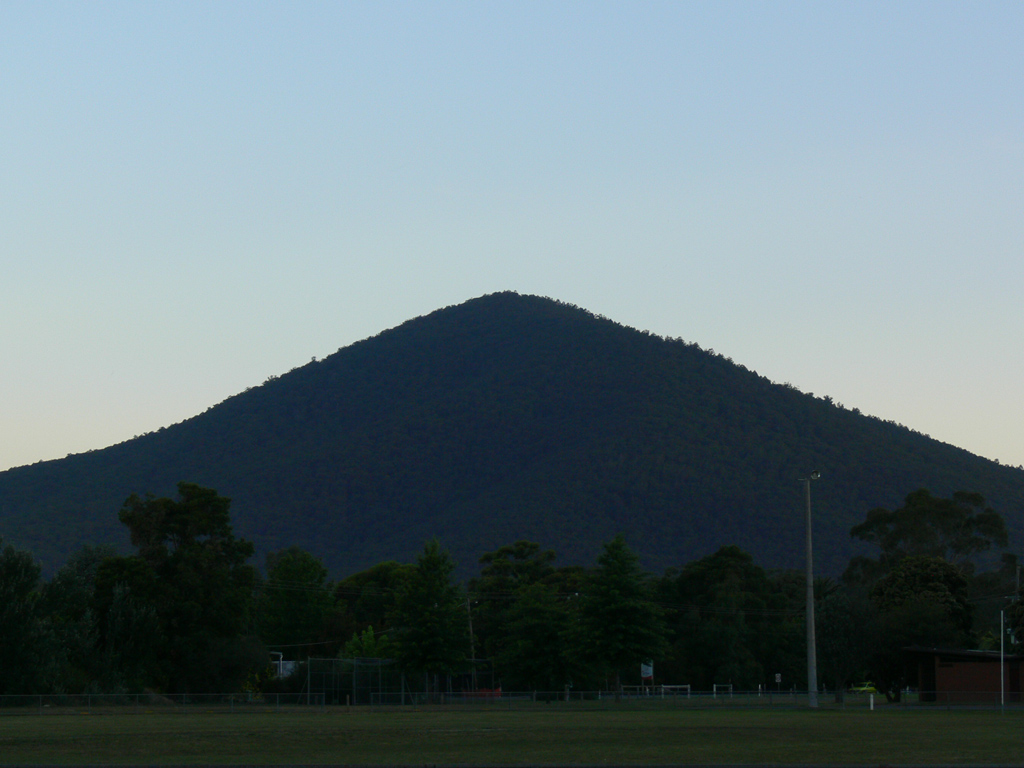
Mount Riddell

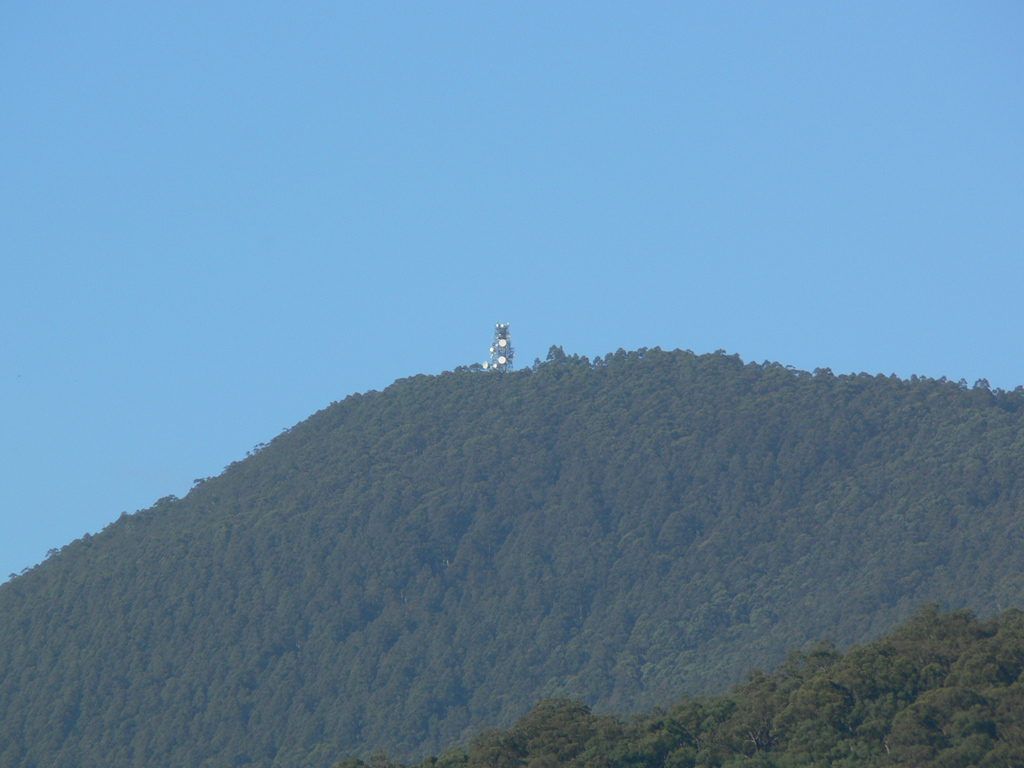
Mount Saint Leonard

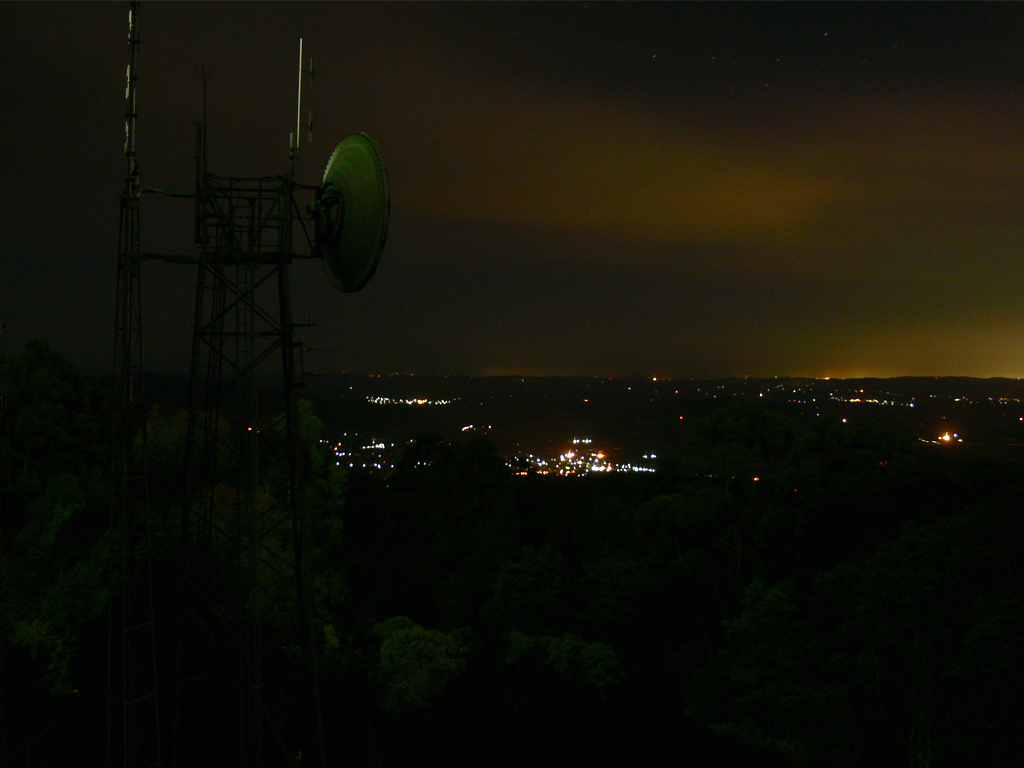
Healesville by night, taken from Mount Saint Leonard

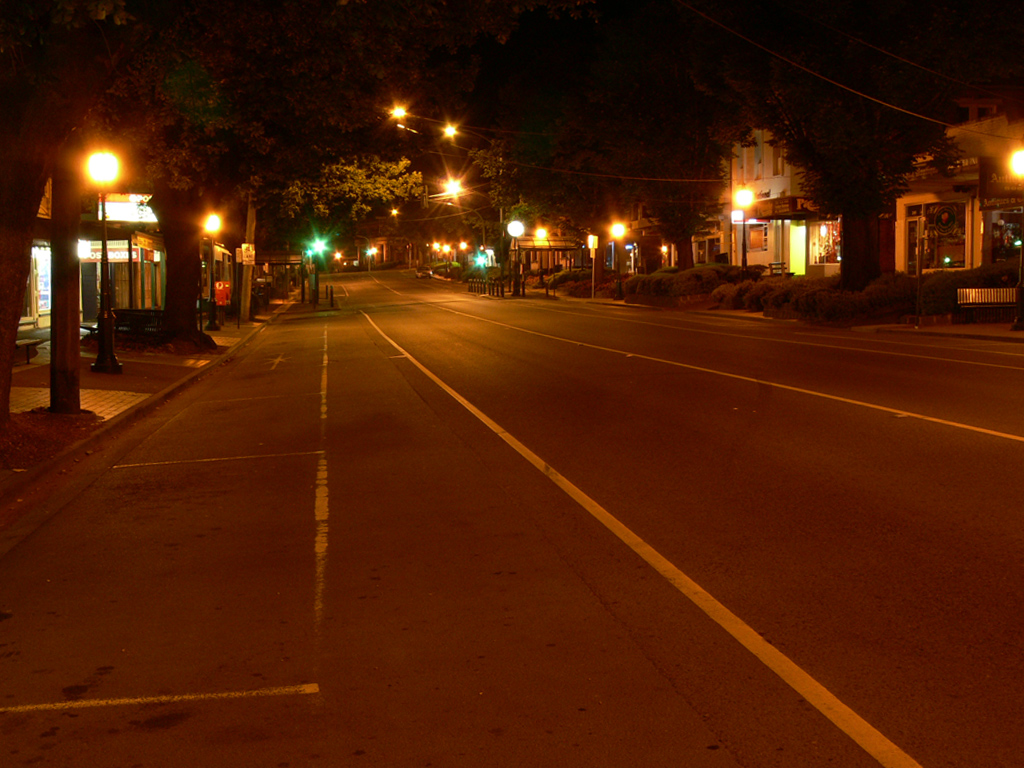
Healesville Main Street at night

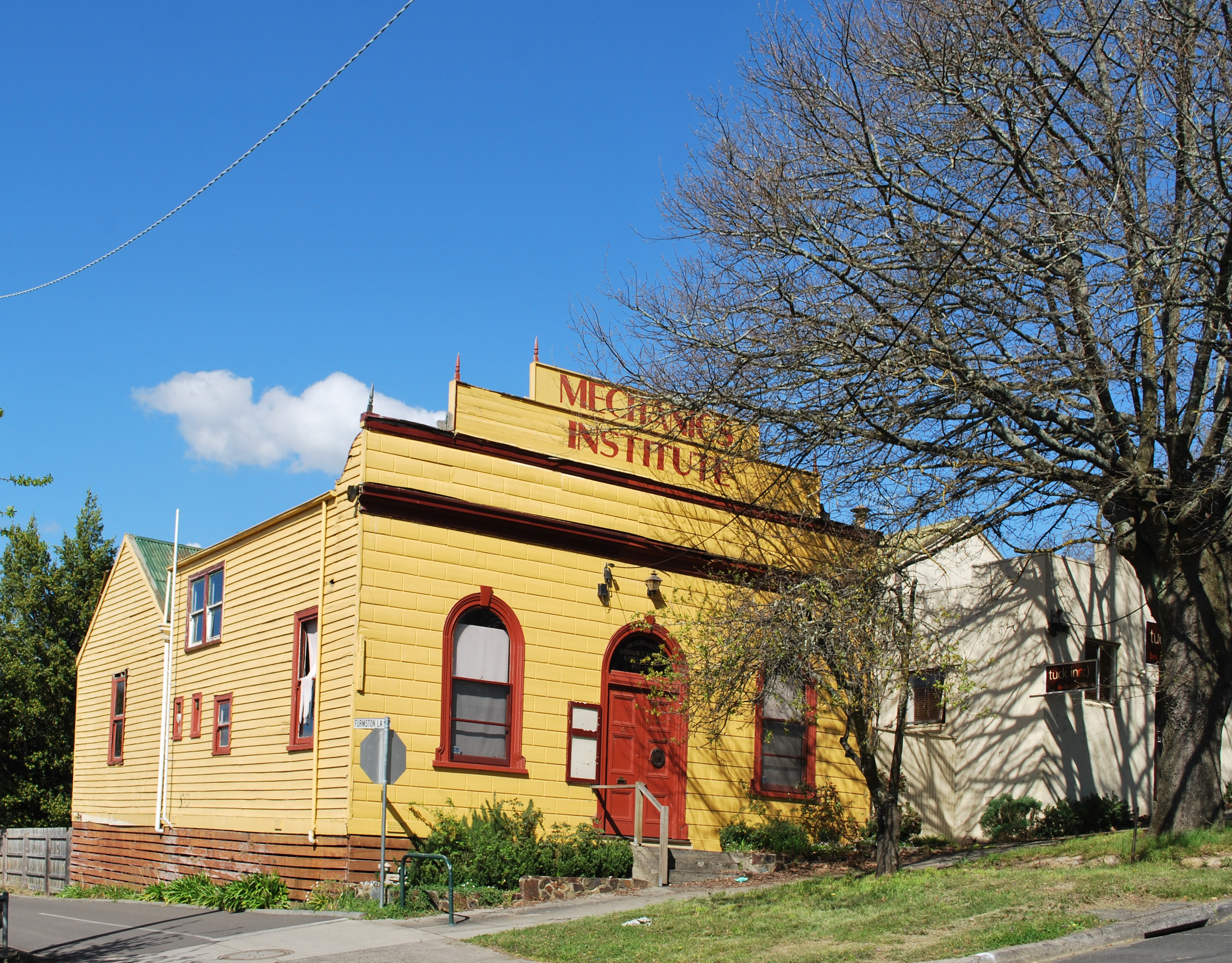
Mechanics Institute

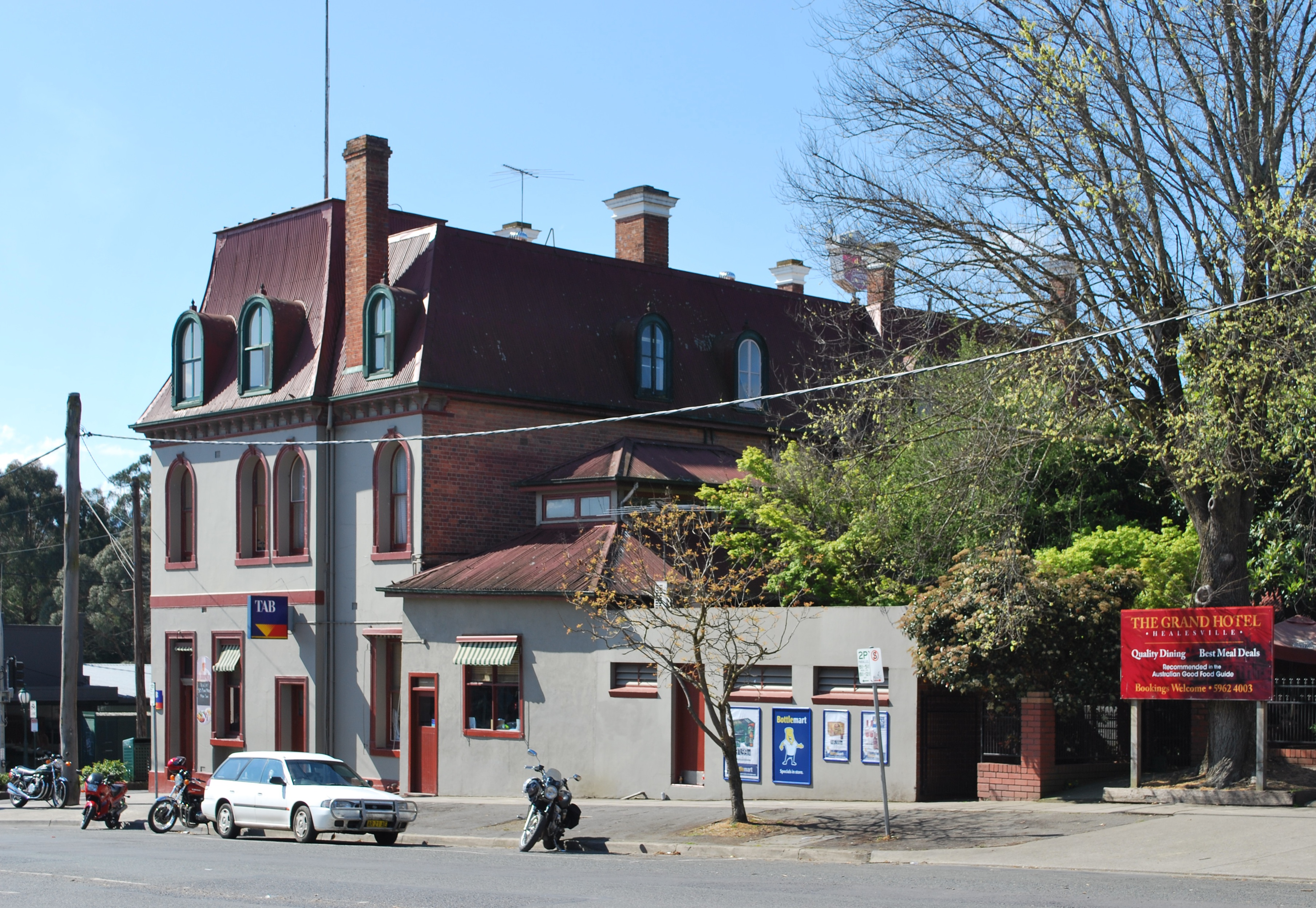
Grand Hotel

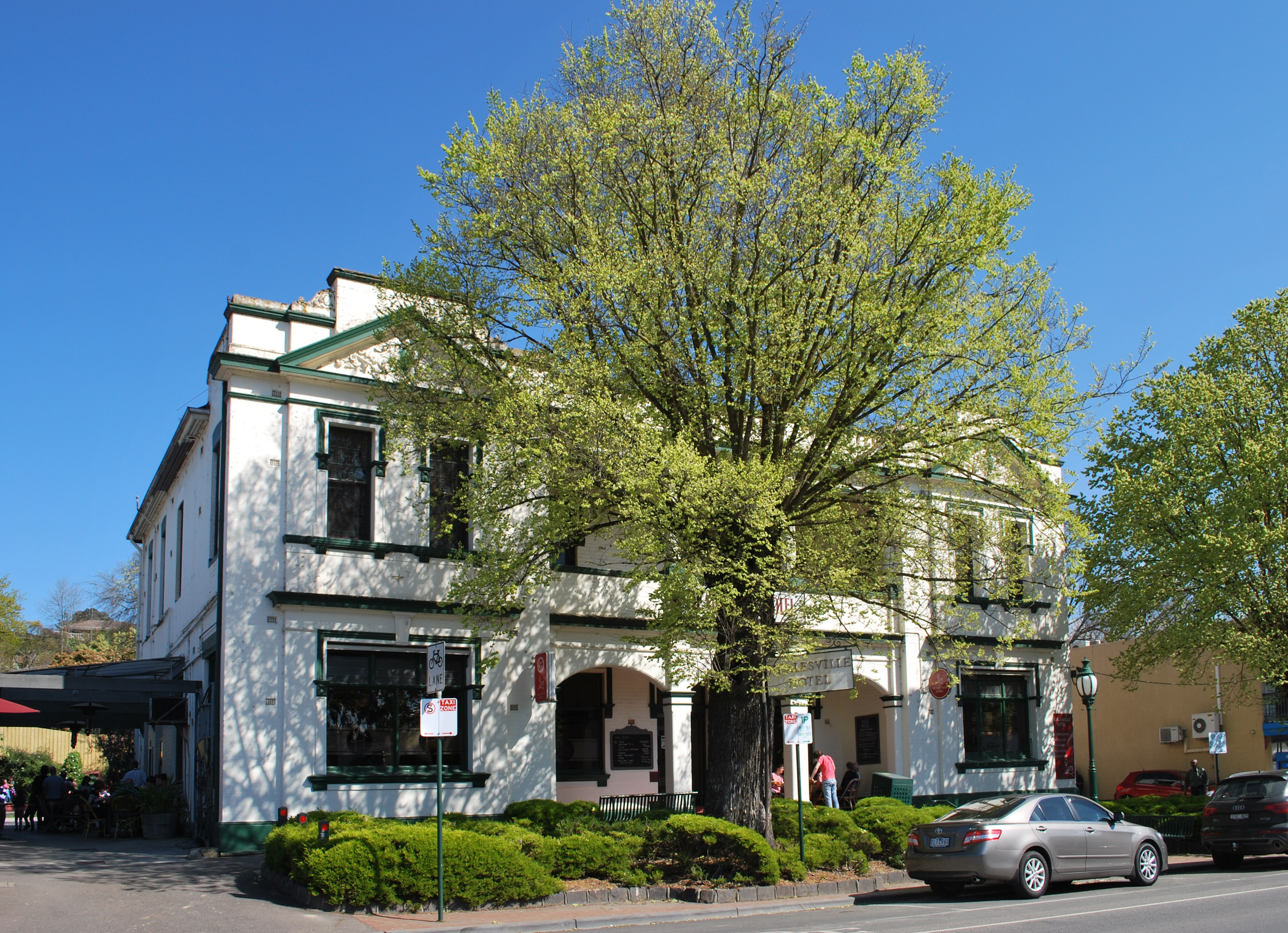
Healesville Hotel

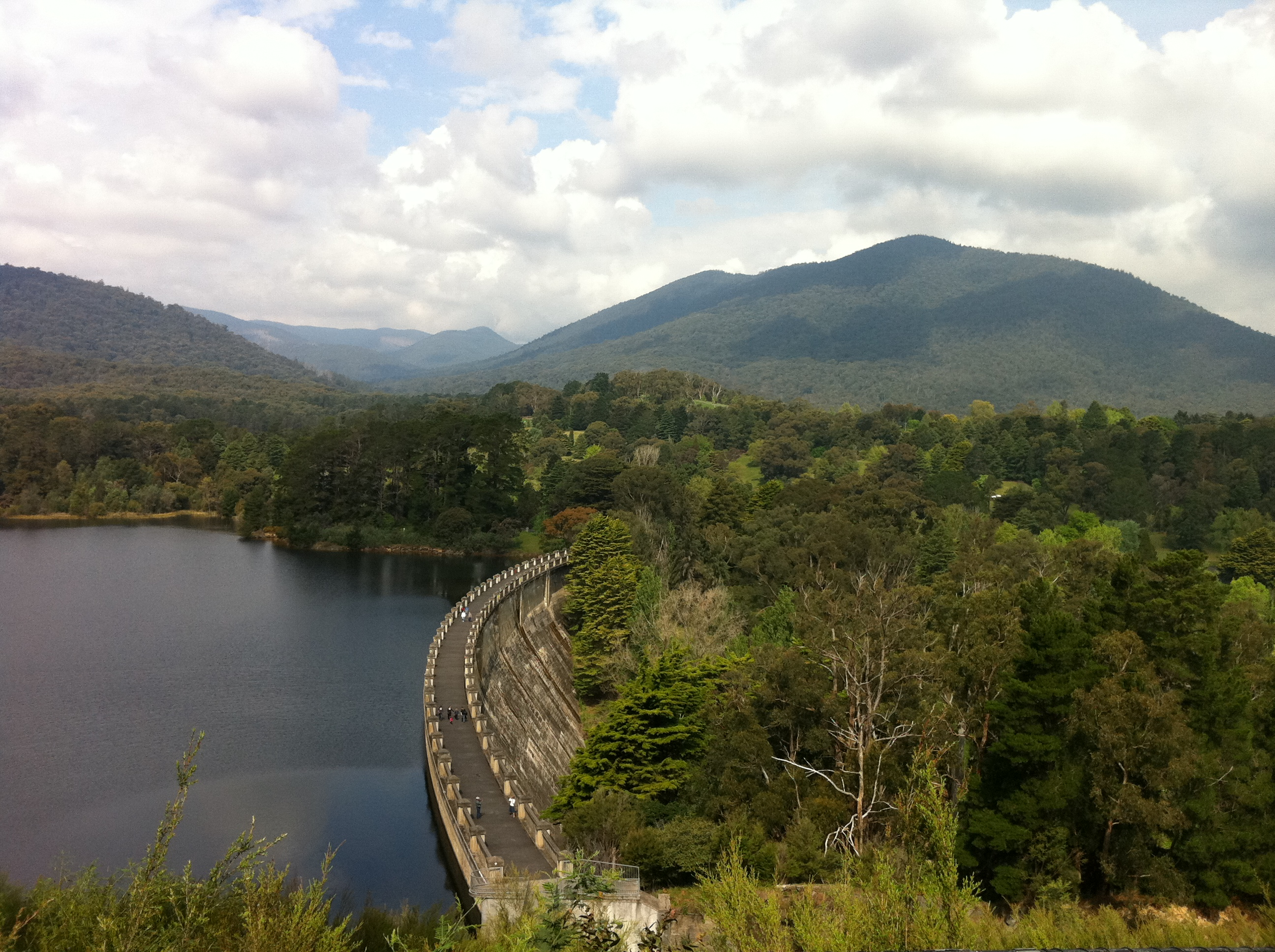
Maroondah Dam in 2011

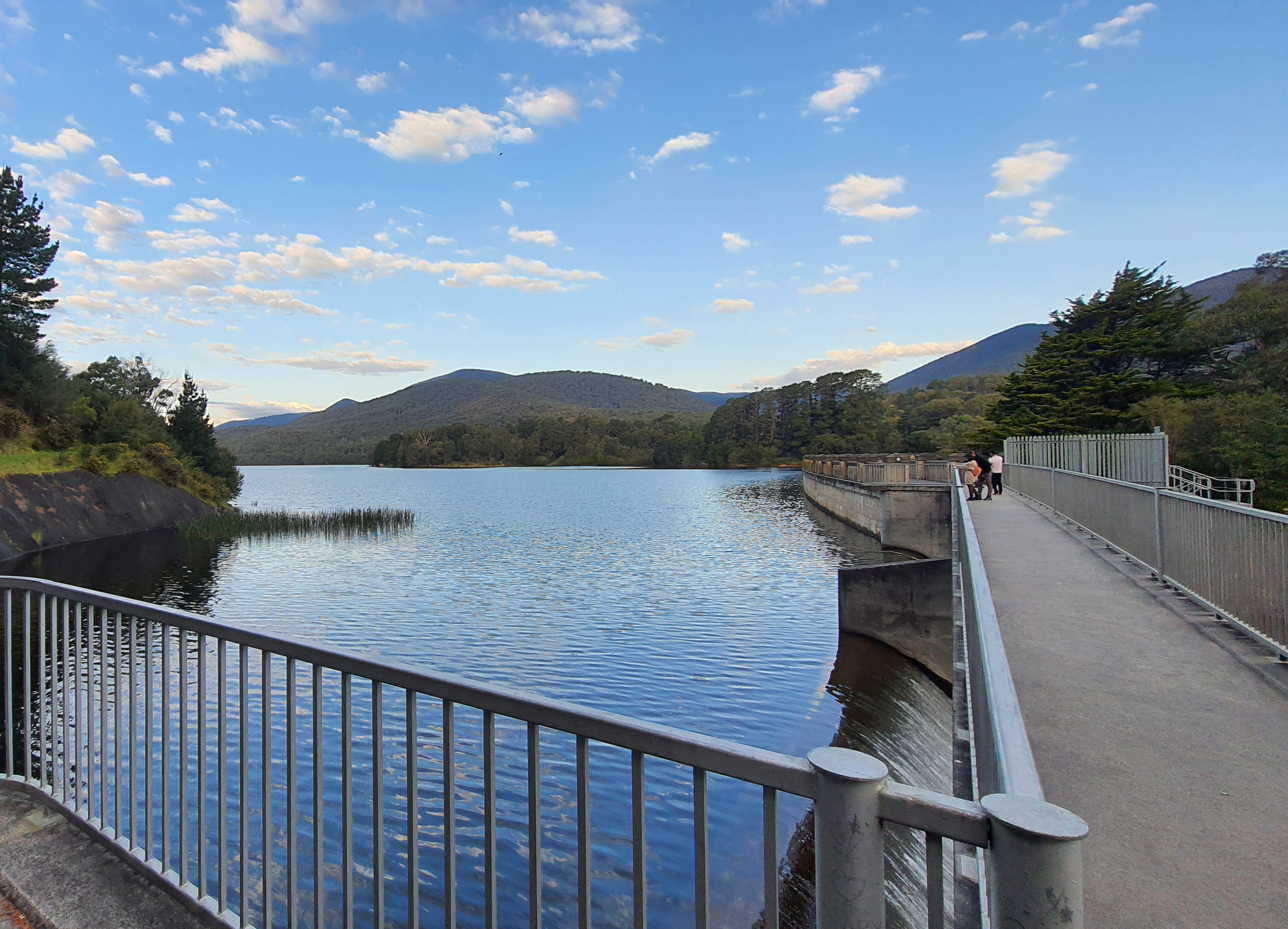
Maroondah Reservoir in September 2023

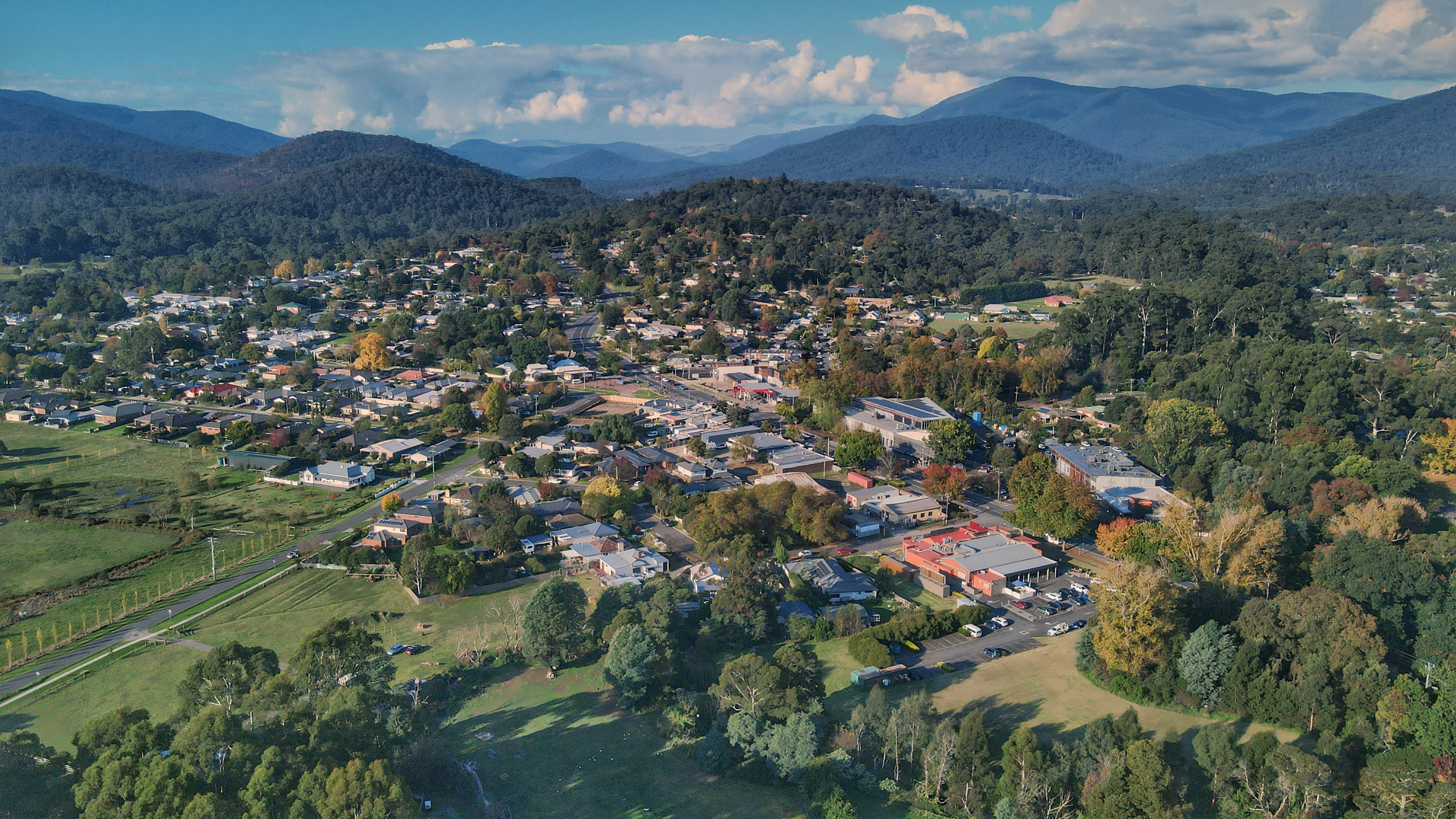
Healesville from above, shot in April 2022

== See also ==
- Yarra Track
- Richard Heales
