= Chum Creek =

Chum Creek Victoria
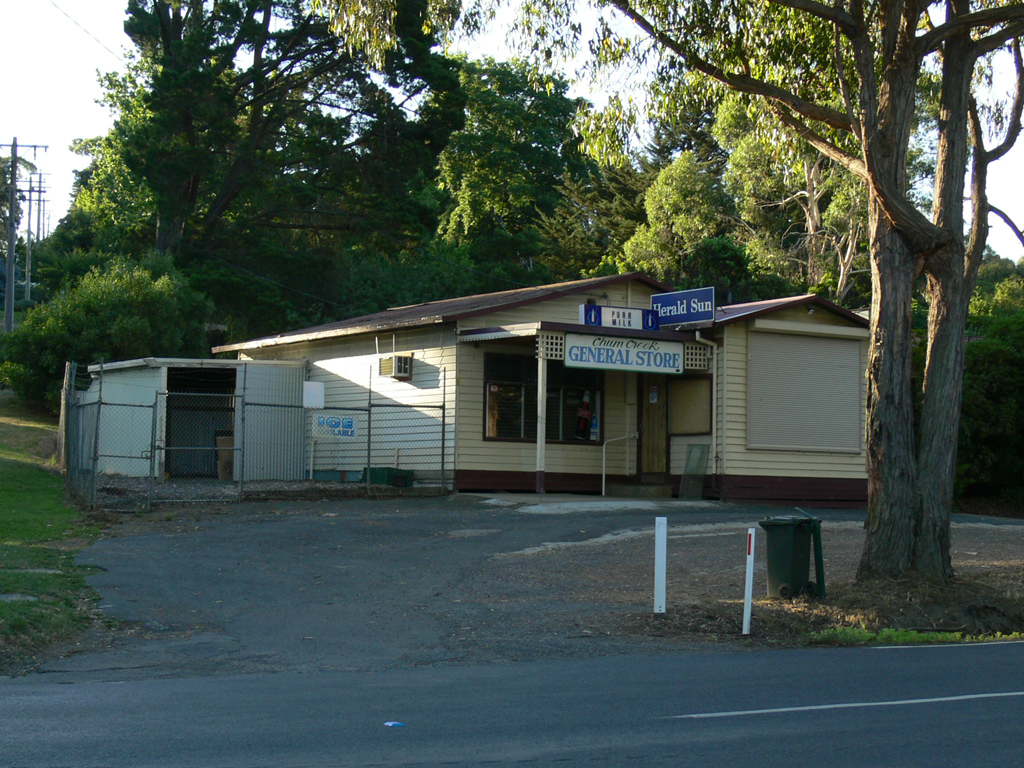
- Chum Creek General Store

- Coordinates: 37.606°S 145.488°E
- Population: 981 (2021 census)
- Postcode(s): 3777
- Location: 65 km (40 mi) from Melbourne; 5 km (3 mi) from Healesville
- LGA(s): Shire of Yarra Ranges
- State electorate(s): Eildon
- Federal division(s): McEwen
Localities around Chum Creek:
Toolangi	Toolangi	Toolangi
Dixons Creek	Chum Creek	Healesville
Dixons Creek	Healesville	Healesville

Chum Creek is a town in Victoria, Australia, 50 km north-east from Melbourne's central business district, located within the Shire of Yarra Ranges local government area. Chum Creek recorded a population of 981 at the 2021 census.

== History ==
In the mid-1850s traces of gold were found in the creek. In 1891 a sawmill was established and tree cutting gave way to clearing and farming selections. In 1892 the area was surveyed for selections. In 1897 the school was opened and there was an early Methodist church. In the 1930s Lake Yambunga was excavated for swimming and camping. In 1937 a new Presbyterian church was built.

== Population ==
In the 2016 Census, there were 983 people in Chum Creek. 79.9% of people were born in Australia and 90.4% of people spoke only English at home. The most common responses for religion were No Religion 46.2%, Catholic 13.7% and Anglican 11.8%.

== Schools ==
=== Government ===
- Chum Creek Primary School is a small, rural, State-run P-6 school. Since 1897 the school has served the Chum Creek, Toolangi and Healesville West communities. The school is known for a low-key and friendly approach to education as well as a focus on environmental education and sustainable living.

=== Private ===
- Wesley College - Chum Creek outdoor education campus (established 1952).

== Local Store ==
- The Chum Creek General Store opened in 1953, closed in 2014. Currently a private residence.

== Gallery ==
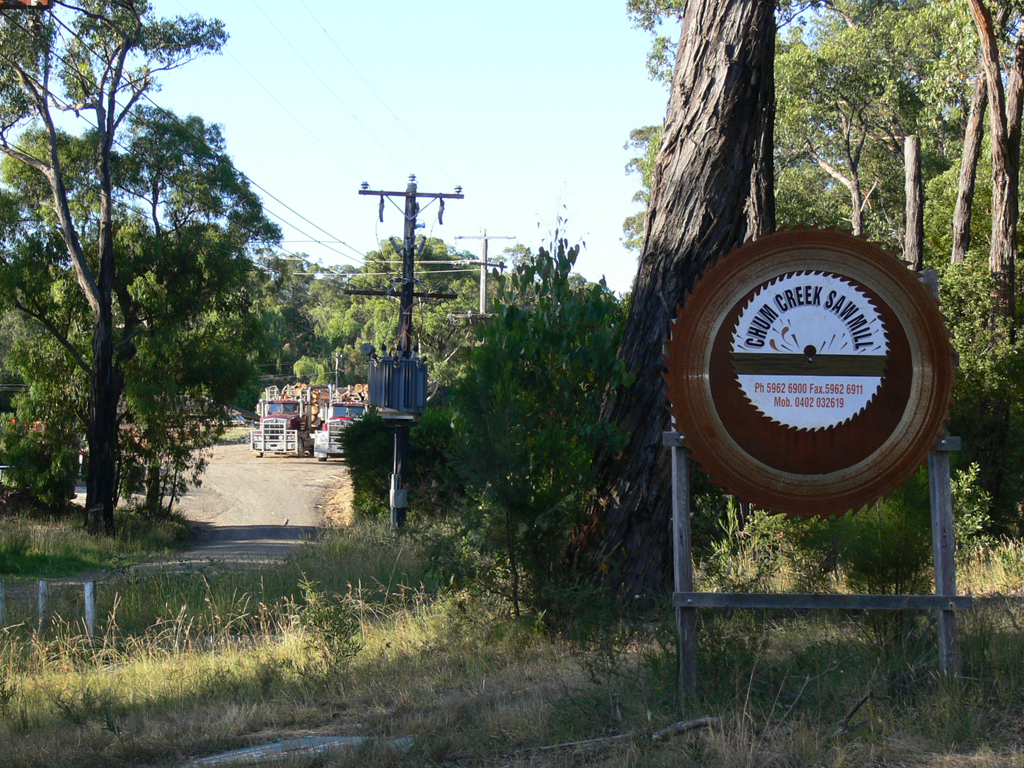
Chum Creek Sawmill

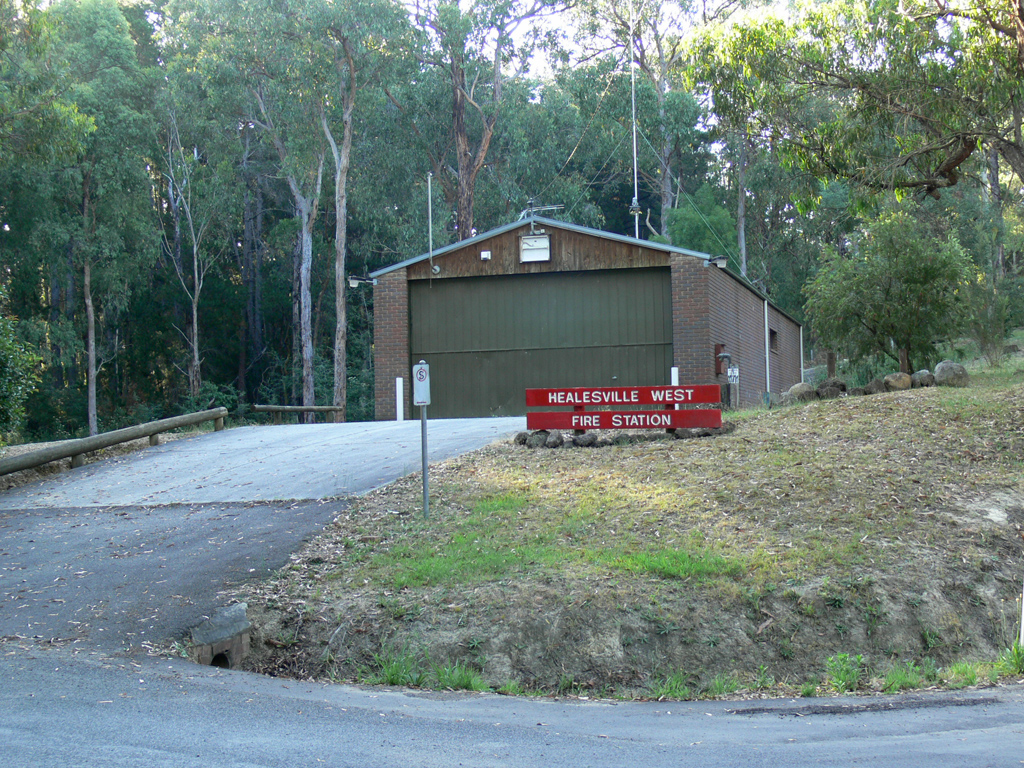
Healesville West Fire Station

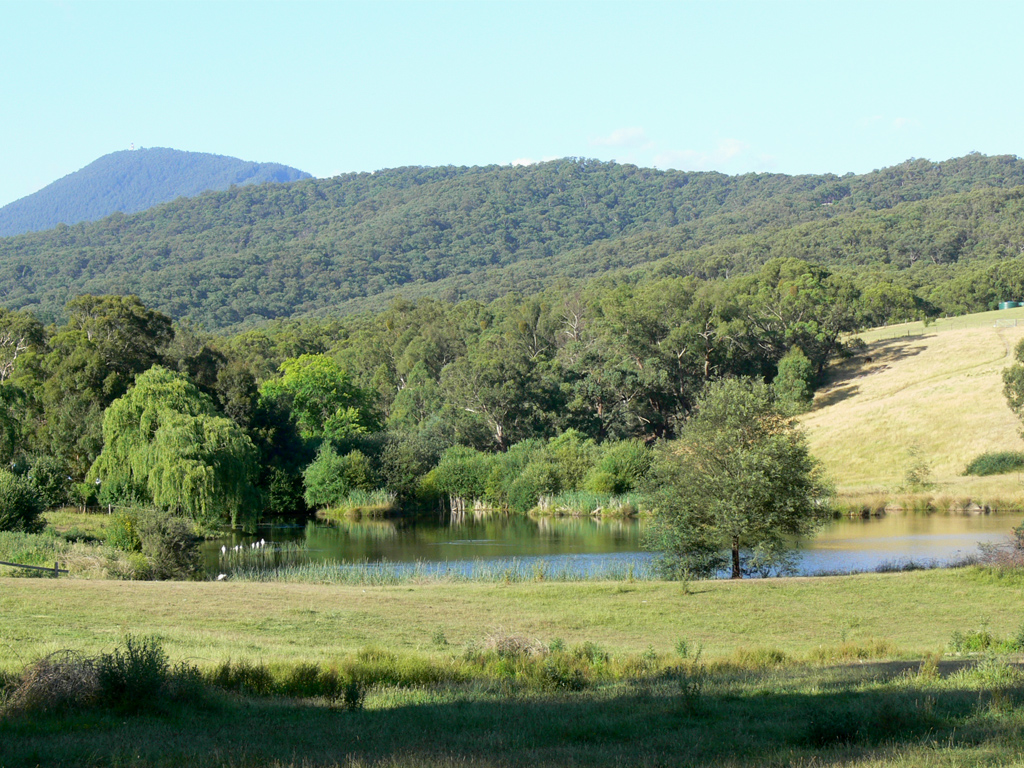
Yumbunga Lake
