= Alice Kitchin =

Australian nurse (1873–1950)

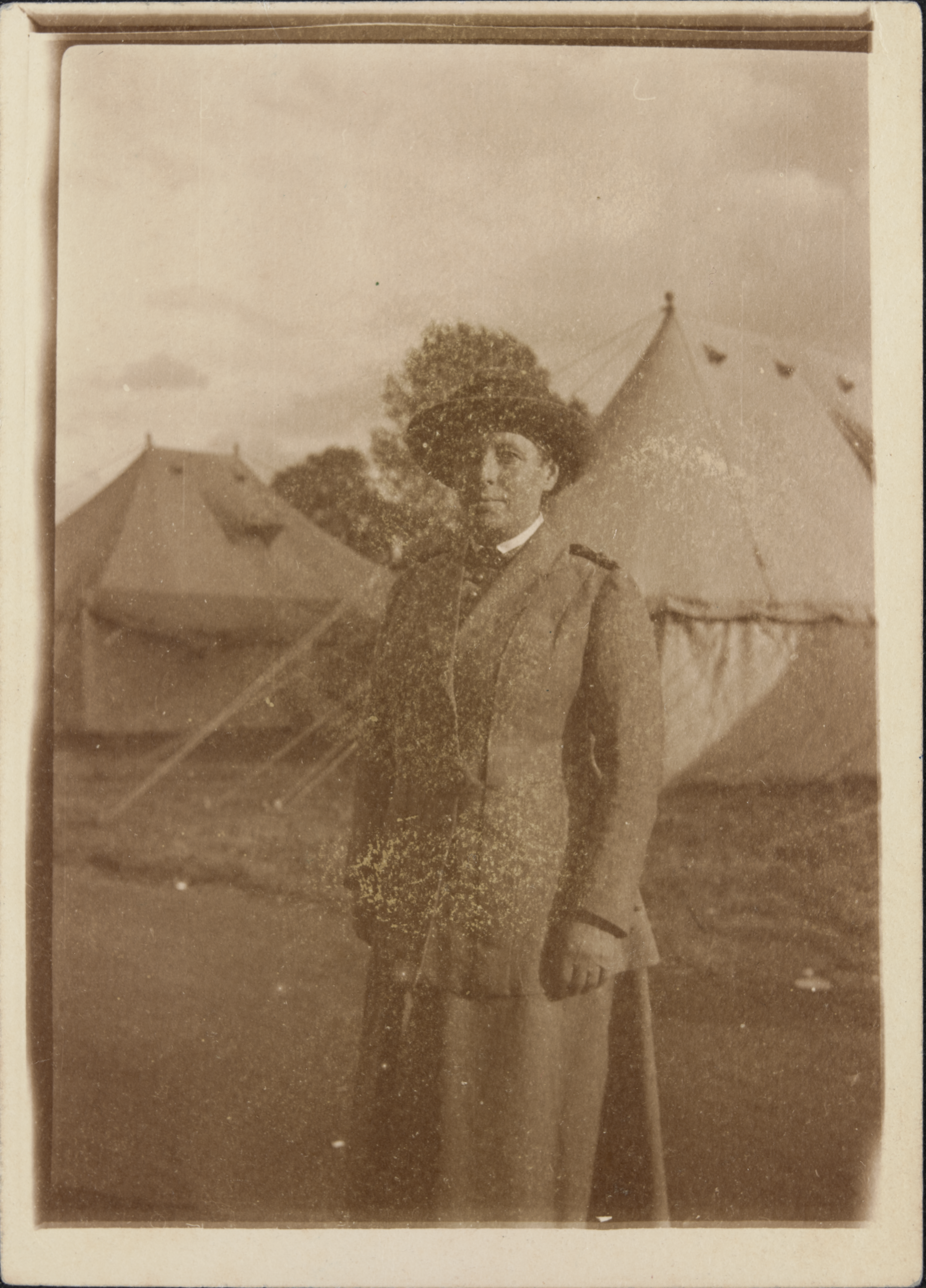
- Kitchin in the First World War
- Born: 19 February 1873; Amherst, Victoria, Australia
- Died: 17 June 1950 (aged 77); Chelsea, Victoria, Australia
- Burial place: Melbourne Cemetery
- Military career
- Allegiance: Australia
- Branch: Australian Imperial Force
- Service years: 1914–1919
- Rank: Sister
- Unit: Australian Army Nursing Service
- Conflicts: First World War

Alice Elizabeth Barrett Kitchin (19 February 1873 – 17 June 1950) was an Australian nurse who served in the First World War with the Australian Army Nursing Service.

== Early life ==
Kitchin was born in Amherst, Victoria, near Ballarat on 19 February 1873 to parents Barret Kitchin and Mary Ann (née Conway). Kitchin had five siblings – William (1872–1872), Albert Henry (1874–5), Mary Ann (1876–1946), Louisa (1879–1898) and Margaret (1878–1966). After William died in 1879, Mary Ann with her surviving children moved to Melbourne. Kitchin's mother was unwell, and largely cared for by Alice, along with her nursing study and duties. By 1905 Kitchin, her mother and sisters Mary Ann and Margaret were living at 337 Sydney Road Brunswick, the sisters’ dressmakers’ shop. The sisters participated in the social activities of the Shamrock Club, Alice and 5 other early enlistees being farewelled from there in 1914. Mary Ann died in 1929, and the three sisters had moved to Alençon, Point Nepean Road, Edithvale by 1936, with Margaret and Mary Ann continuing as dressmakers. Alice died at Chelsea in June 1950 and is buried in Melbourne Cemetery.

== Education ==
Kitchin studied nursing at the Royal Melbourne Hospital, gaining her certificate in 1899 and registration in 1901. She studied for a further qualification on infectious diseases in 1906. The Australian Army Nursing Service Reserve was formed in 1902 to provide volunteer civilian nurses in the event of a national emergency, and Kitchin joined them in 1907.

== War experiences ==
Enlisting as a nursing sister with the Australian Imperial Force on 26 September 1914, and was posted to No. 1 Australian General Hospital. She sailed with five other nurses: Mary Finlay, Evelyn Conyers, Jane Lempriere, Hilda Ridderwold Samsing, and Jessie McHardy White.

The nurses sailed with the 8th Battalion aboard HMAT Benalla on 19 October 1914, arriving in Egypt on 4 December. Kitchin ended up nursing many men of the 8th as the battalion fought at Gallipoli and later in France.

=== Middle East ===
Kitchin's first role was at No. 2 Australian General Hospital at Mena, 12 miles east of Cairo at the foot of the pyramids, under the direction of Sister Nellie Gould. Moving to No. 1 Australian General Hospital at the Palace Hotel Heliopolis in February 1915, under Matron Jane Bell, a colleague from Kitchin's days at Melbourne Hospital. At the end of April, after the Gallipoli offensive, wounded soldiers began to arrive in Alexandria. Kitchin wrote of her experience:

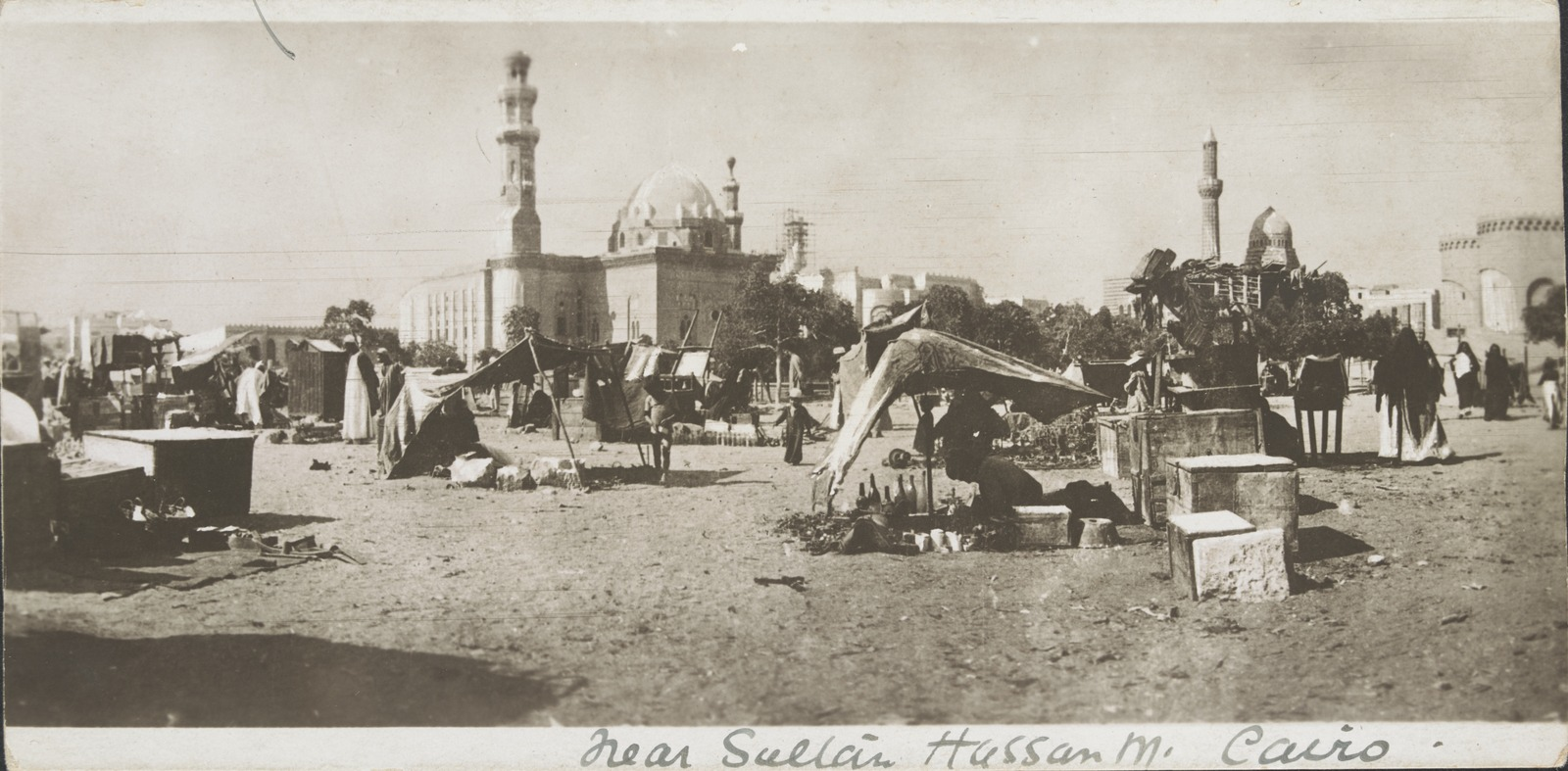
Market near Sultan Hassan Mosk, Cairo, Egypt. State Library victoria, Melbourne, Australia. MS9627/PHO3

By this time perhaps all the men we looked on as friends have been blotted out of existence. All our leave has been stopped until further notice. Another turmoil of a day. I have charge of 42 officers, some of them good friends. The work is harrowing. If we had been nursing strange troops we may have felt it less, but among our own people the horrors of war are brought home. Almost everyone on the nursing or medical staff has a relation or friend at the front so you dread the latest news...

In May 1915, Matron Bell offered Kitchin and Hilda Samsing the opportunity to travel back to Australia with convalescent patients. They declined the offer and requested instead a posting to a hospital ship, transporting wounded soldiers away from the front. On 7 June the pair heard that they were to join the medical crew on HS Gascon. Gascon ferried wounded soldiers between the Gallipoli Peninsula, field hospitals and permanent hospitals. Kitchin wrote at this time:

One wonders when the awful destruction of life will stop. There seems no safe spot for them anywhere on this rough spot, except in their dugouts. They seem to take their lives in their hands whenever they move about for water food or air or anything…. The crack of rifles and occasionally machine guns are plainly audible. Somehow, we never think of any danger to this boat, and everyone believes the Turks play the game fairly.

After the evacuation from Gallipoli in December 1915, Kitchin returned to nursing in Cairo at Heliopolis.

=== France ===
Kitchin was transferred to Boulogne, France, in April 1916 to No. 2 Australian General Hospital, and later to Rouen and casualty clearing stations. After living through the heat of a Mediterranean summer – a bitterly cold European winter meant the thick woollen uniforms so oppressive in Egypt – and the source of conflict with the hierarchy were welcome in France. Kitchin was admitted with bronchitis to hospital in Rouen in December 1916, and was then evacuated to England on HMHS Aberdonian in January 1917.

=== England ===
Once recovered, Kitchin served at Harefield and Dartford with No. 1 Australian Auxiliary Hospital. Harefield was a hospital for soldiers who had been permanently incapacitated by their injuries. A persistent cough saw her spend further time at St Alban's Convalescent Home for Australian Nurses in February 1918.

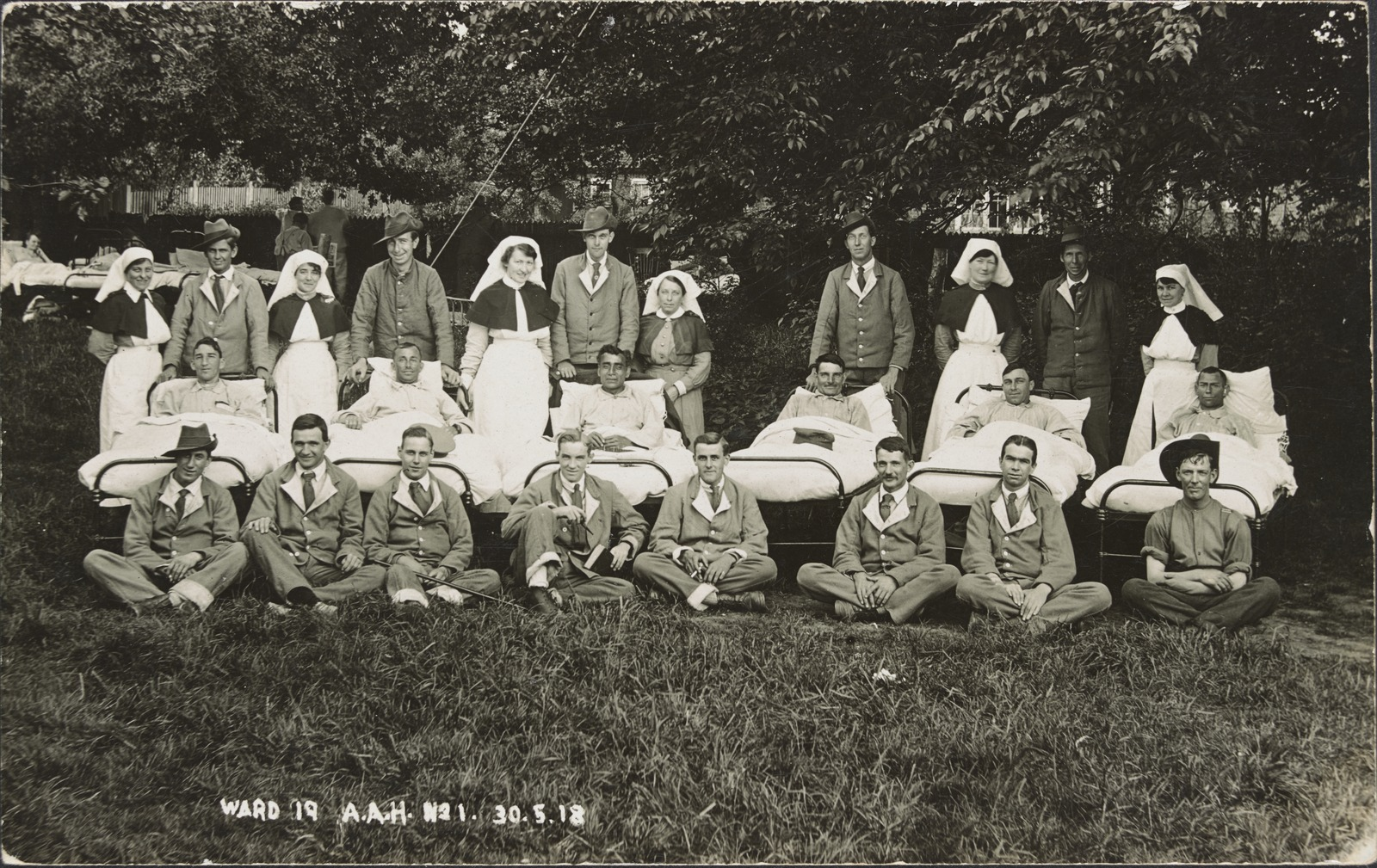
Soldiers and Nurses of Ward 19, A.A.H. N21 on 30 May 18

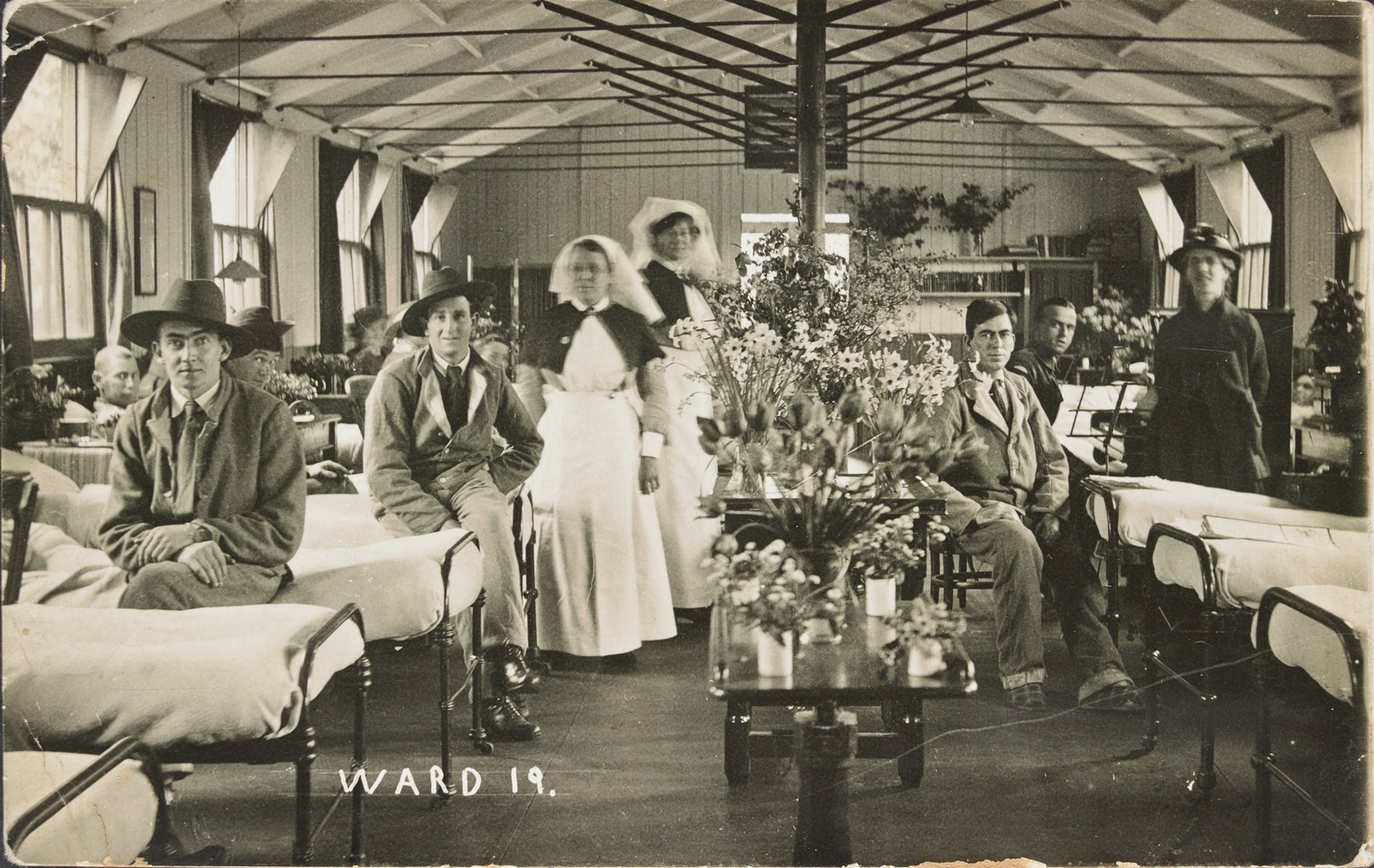
Kitchin and other nurses in W 19, Harefield.

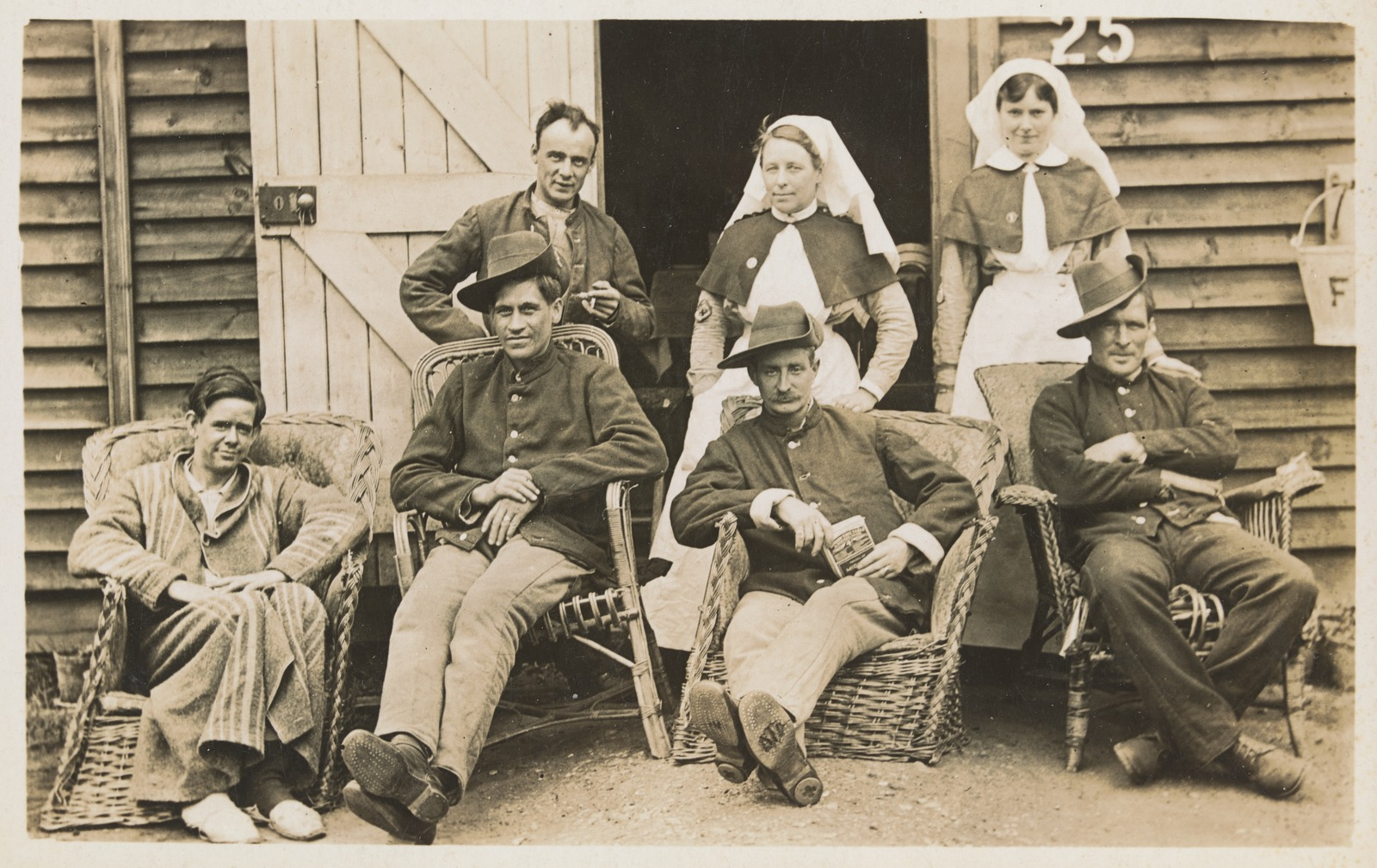
Two nurses and soldiers, seated

Kitchin noted in her diary on 19 October 1917 – "3 years since we left home – it sometimes seems like 3 centuries ago." On 21 March 1918 the German army launched the Spring Offensive, designed to drive a wedge between the French and British armies on the Western Front, before American troops entered the war. Of this time, Kitchen wrote:

The Great offensive has started, God grant it may be a victory for us, though the casualties are bound to be awful for both sides...a great anxiety overshadows us night and day and one feels that for he few we know or belong to us in that awful maelstrom it is impossible to entertain much hope.

After the armistice, Kitchin successfully applied for education leave to attend a course at the Royal Sanitary Institute in Buckingham Palace Road. To return home, Kitchin joined the nursing staff aboard HS Kanowna, arriving back in Melbourne on 23 October 1919.
