= Jessie McHardy White =

Australian army principal matron (1870–1957)

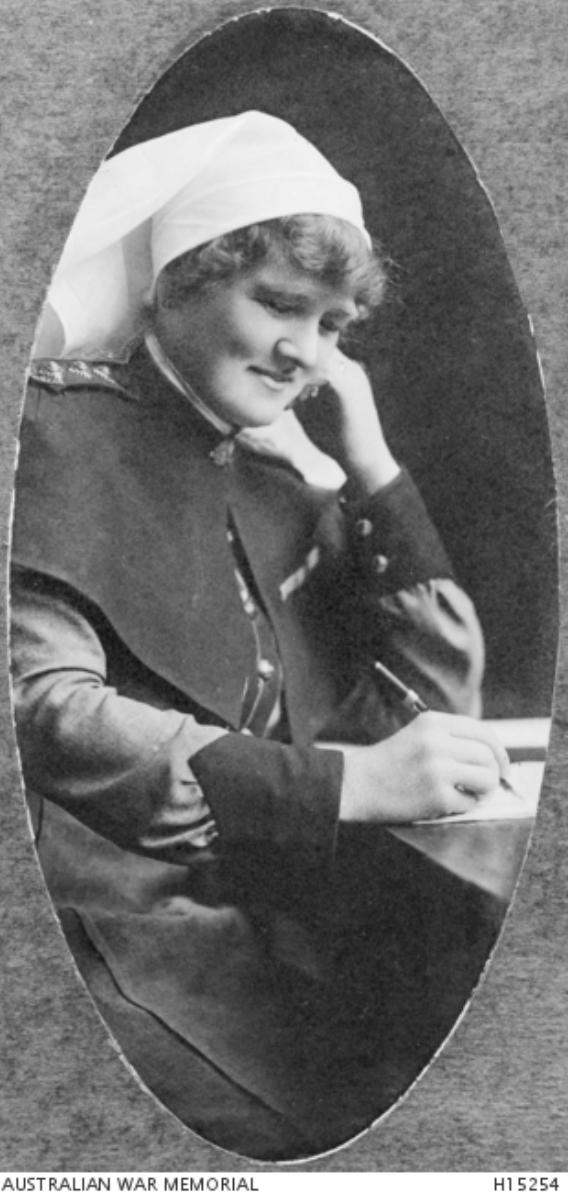
- WWI image of White
- Born: 24 July 1870; Healesville, Victoria
- Died: 26 October 1957 (aged 87); Hawthorn, Victoria
- Military career
- Allegiance: Australia
- Branch: Australian Army
- Service years: 1906–1919
- Rank: Principal Matron
- Unit: Australian Army Nursing Service Reserve
- Conflicts: First World War
- Awards: Member of the Order of the British Empire; Royal Red Cross; Mentioned in Despatches; Medal of Military Merit (Greece); Order of St. Sava (Serbia)

Jessie McHardy White, MBE, RRC (née Williamson; 24 July 1870 – 26 October 1957) was an Australian army principal matron.

== Early life and education ==
Jessie McHardy Williamson was born on 24 July 1870 at Yarra Flats, near Healesville in Victoria; she was the fifth surviving child of John Williamson, a farmer, and his wife Mary (née McHardy). Both of her parents were born in Scotland. On 21 December 1893, Williamson married Thomas James White at Scots Church in Melbourne.

== Nursing career ==
White pursued a career in nursing, undertaking her comprehensive training at The Alfred Hospital from December 1896 to February 1900. Following that, she furthered her expertise in midwifery by completing her training at the Women's Hospital from February 1900 to March 1901.

In 1906, White took charge of a private hospital in Melbourne and became a member of the Australian Army Nursing Service Reserve (AANS). In October 1914, White set sail with the initial group of the Australian Imperial Force (AIF) and reached Egypt on 4 December. She was assigned to a British military hospital and also served on a hospital ship. Additionally, she briefly held the position of matron at No. 1 Australian General Hospital. In early 1916, due to a reorganization of the Australian Army Medical Corps and the AANS, she was appointed as the principal matron of the AIF in England. After Matron-in-Chief Evelyn Conyers arrived in London, White returned to Australia in August, having been awarded the Royal Red Cross (1st Class) for her exceptional contributions.

White, who was appointed a Member of the Order of the British Empire, was mentioned in despatches, and was honoured with the Greek Medal of Military Merit and the Serbian Order of St. Sava, was recognized for her exceptional work at Salonica. She concluded her service with the AIF on 7 August, upon returning to Australia on 28 June 1919. Throughout her nursing career, she remained actively involved in the affairs of returned nurses and dedicated twenty-five years as president of the Salonica Sisters' Group.

== Personal life ==
White married with Presbyterian forms Thomas James White, a bookkeeper of Fitzroy. She widowed at a young age; she was only 26 when her husband of three years was killed in 1896. White died on 26 October 1957 in East Hawthorn, Melbourne.
