= General Gordon =

General Gordon may refer to:

== People ==
=== United Kingdom ===
- Lord Adam Gordon (British Army officer) (1726–1801), British Army general
- Alexander Gordon (general) (1670–1752), Scottish general who fought under Peter the Great in 1696–1711, and for the Jacobites in the Jacobite rising of 1715
- Alexander Hamilton-Gordon (British Army officer, born 1817) (1817–1890), British Army general
- Alexander Hamilton-Gordon (British Army officer, born 1859) (1859–1939), British Army lieutenant-general
- Andrew Gordon (British Army officer) (died 1806), British Army lieutenant-general
- Charles George Gordon (1833–1885), British Army major-general and administrator also known as Chinese Gordon and Gordon of Khartoum
- Cosmo Gordon (1736–1800), British Army general
- Desmond Gordon (1911–1997), British Army major general
- Frederick Gordon (British Army officer) (1861–1927), British Army brigadier and temporary major-general in the early Royal Air Force
- George Gordon, 4th Earl of Huntly (1514–1562), Scottish nobleman and commander of the King's Army at the Battle of Haddon Rig
- George Gordon, 5th Duke of Gordon (1770–1836), Scottish British Army general
- George Gordon-Lennox (1908–1988), British Army lieutenant-general
- Hugh Gordon (British Army officer) (1760–1823), British Army lieutenant general
- James Gordon (British Army officer, born 1957), British Army major-general
- James Willoughby Gordon (1772–1851), British Army general
- John James Hood Gordon (1832–1908), British Army general
- John William Gordon (1814–1870), British Army major-general
- Patrick Gordon (1635–1699), Scottish general and rear admiral in Russia
- Robert Gordon (British Army officer) (born 1950), British Army major general
- Robert Gordon-Finlayson (1881–1956), British Army general
- Robert Gordon-Finlayson (British Army officer, born 1916) (1916–2001), British Army major general
- Thomas Edward Gordon (1832–1914), British Army general
- William Gordon (British Army officer, born 1736) (1736–1818), British Army general

=== United States ===
- B. Frank Gordon (1826–1866), acting Confederate States Army general in the American Civil War
- George Gordon (Civil War general) (1836–1911), Confederate States Army general in the American Civil War
- George Henry Gordon (1823–1886), Union Army general in the American Civil War
- James B. Gordon (1822–1864), Confederate States Army general in the American Civil War
- John A. Gordon (born 1946), U.S. Air Force general
- John Brown Gordon (1832-1904), Confederate States Army general in the American Civil War
- Walter Henry Gordon (1863–1924), U.S. Army major general
- William F. Gordon (1787–1858), Virginia Militia major general
- William Washington Gordon II (1834–1912), U.S. Army brigadier general

=== Others ===
- Humberto Gordon (1927–2000), Chilean Army general
- Ian Gordon (general) (born 1952), Australian Army major general
- Joseph Maria Gordon (1856–1929), Australian Army major-general

== Other uses ==
- General Gordon Elementary School, Vancouver, British Columbia, Canada
- General Gordon Hotel, former name of The Griffins pub in Adelaide, Australia

== See also ==
- Fred A. Gorden (born 1940), U.S. Army major general
- USS General W. H. Gordon (AP-117), a troop transport
- Attorney General Gordon (disambiguation)
