= Near East =

Geographical term that roughly encompasses West Asia

Coordinates: 32°48′N 35°36′E

Topographic map of parts of the Near East

The Near East or The Levant is a transcontinental region around the Eastern Mediterranean encompassing the historical Fertile Crescent (that is, the Levant and Mesopotamia), as well as Anatolia, Egypt, and occasionally the Balkan and Arabian Peninsulas. The term was coined in the 19th century by modern Western geographers and was originally applied to the Ottoman Empire, but today has varying definitions within different academic circles. The term Near East was used to refer to the part of the Orient nearest to Europe, as opposed to the Middle East (then comprising the lands between the Persian Gulf and Southeast Asia) and the Far East (East Asia and beyond), together known as the "three Easts"; it was a separate term from the Middle East during earlier times and official British usage. As of 2024, both terms are used interchangeably by politicians and news reporters to refer to the same region. Near East, Middle East, and Far East are all Eurocentric terms.

According to the National Geographic Society, the terms Near East and Middle East denote the same territories and are "generally accepted as comprising the countries of the Arabian Peninsula, Cyprus, Egypt, Iraq, Iran, Israel, Jordan, Lebanon, Palestinian territories, Syria, and Turkey".

In 1997, the Food and Agriculture Organization (FAO) of the United Nations defined the region similarly, but also included Afghanistan. The part of the region that is in Asia (not including Egypt, the Balkans, and Thrace) is "now commonly referred to as West Asia." Later on in 2012, the FAO defined the Near East as a subregion of the Middle East. The FAO's definition of the Near East included Iraq, Israel, Jordan, Lebanon, Palestine, Syria, and Turkey while the rest of the Middle East included the Arabian Peninsula, the Caucasus, and Iran.

== Eastern question ==
At the height of its power (1683), the Ottoman Empire controlled territory in the Near East and North Africa, as well as Central and Southeastern Europe.

At the beginning of the nineteenth century, the Ottoman Empire included all of the Balkans, north to the southern edge of the Great Hungarian Plain. But by 1914, the empire had lost all of its European territories except Constantinople and Eastern Thrace to the rise of nationalist Balkan states, which saw the independence of the Kingdom of Greece, Kingdom of Serbia, the Danubian Principalities, and the Kingdom of Bulgaria. Up until 1912, the Ottomans retained a band of territory including Albania, Macedonia and the Adrianople Vilayet, which were lost in the two Balkan Wars of 1912–13.

The Ottoman Empire, believed to be about to collapse, was portrayed in the press as the "sick man of Europe." The Balkan states, with the partial exception of Bosnia and Albania, were primarily Christian, as was the majority of Mount Lebanon. Starting in 1894, the Ottomans struck at the Armenians and Assyrians on the explicit grounds that they were non-Muslim peoples and as such were a potential threat to the Muslim empire within which they lived. The Hamidian Massacres, Adana Massacres and Massacres of Badr Khan targeting Assyrians and Armenians aroused the indignation of the entire Christian world. In the United States, the then aging Julia Ward Howe, author of the Battle Hymn of the Republic, leapt into the war of words and joined the Red Cross. Relations of minorities within the Ottoman Empire and the disposition of former Ottoman lands became known as the "Eastern question", as the Ottomans were on the east of Europe.

It now became relevant to define the east of the eastern question. In about the middle of the nineteenth century, Near East came into use to describe that part of the east closest to Europe. The term Far East appeared contemporaneously meaning Japan, China, Korea, Indonesia and Vietnam. Near East applied to what had been mainly known as the Levant, which was in the jurisdiction of the Ottoman Porte, or government. Europeans could not set foot on most of the shores of the southern and central Mediterranean from the Gulf of Sidra to Albania without permits from the Ottoman Empire.

Such regions as the coastal-Mediterranean Maghreb beyond the Ottoman Porte were included, west of Egypt. During the 15th-18th centuries, the Maghreb consisted of two Ottoman vassal-states, Regency of Algiers and Ottoman Tunisia, as well as the fully-independent, sovereign Sultanate of Morocco along the Barbary Coast. Iran was included because it could not easily be reached except through the Ottoman Empire or neighboring Russia. In the 1890s the term tended to focus on the conflicts in the Balkan states and Armenia. The demise of "the sick man of Europe" left considerable confusion as to what was to be meant by Near East. It is now generally used only in historical contexts, to describe the countries of West Asia from the Mediterranean to (or including) Iran. There is, in short, no universally-understood fixed inventory of nations, languages, or historical assets defined to be in it.

== Background ==
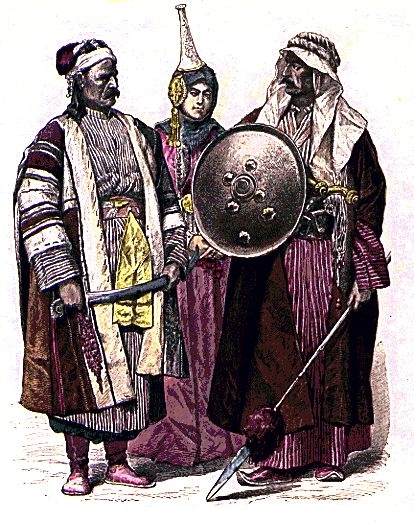
Inhabitants of the Near East, late 19th century

The geographical terms Near East and Far East refer to areas of the globe in or contiguous to the former British Empire and the neighboring colonies of the Dutch, Portuguese, Spanish and French. They fit together as a pair based on the opposites of far and near, suggesting that they were innovated together. They appear together in the journals of the mid-19th century. Both terms were used before then with local British and American meanings: the near or far east of a field, village or shire.

=== Ideas of the East up to the Crimean War ===
There was a linguistic predisposition to use such terms. The Romans had used them in near Gaul / far Gaul, near Spain / far Spain and others. Before them the Greeks had the habit, which appears in Linear B, the oldest known script of Europe, referring to the near province and the far province of the kingdom of Pylos. Usually these terms were given with reference to a geographic feature, such as a mountain range or a river.

Ptolemy's Geography divided Asia on a similar basis. In the north is "Scythia this side of the Himalayas" and "Scythia beyond the Himalayas". To the south is "India on this side of the Ganges" and "India beyond the Ganges". Asia began on the coast of Anatolia ("land of the rising Sun"). Beyond the Ganges and Himalayas (including the Tien Shan) were Serica and Serae (sections of China) and some other identifiable far eastern locations known to the voyagers and geographers but not to the general European public.

By the time of John Seller's Atlas Maritima of 1670, "India Beyond the Ganges" had become "the East Indies" including China, Korea, southeast Asia and the islands of the Pacific in a map that was every bit as distorted as Ptolemy's, despite the lapse of approximately 1,500 years. That "east" in turn was only an English translation of Latin Oriens and Orientalis, "the land of the rising Sun", used since Roman times for "east". The world map of Jodocus Hondius of 1590 labels all of Asia from the Caspian to the Pacific as India Orientalis, shortly to appear in translation as the East Indies.

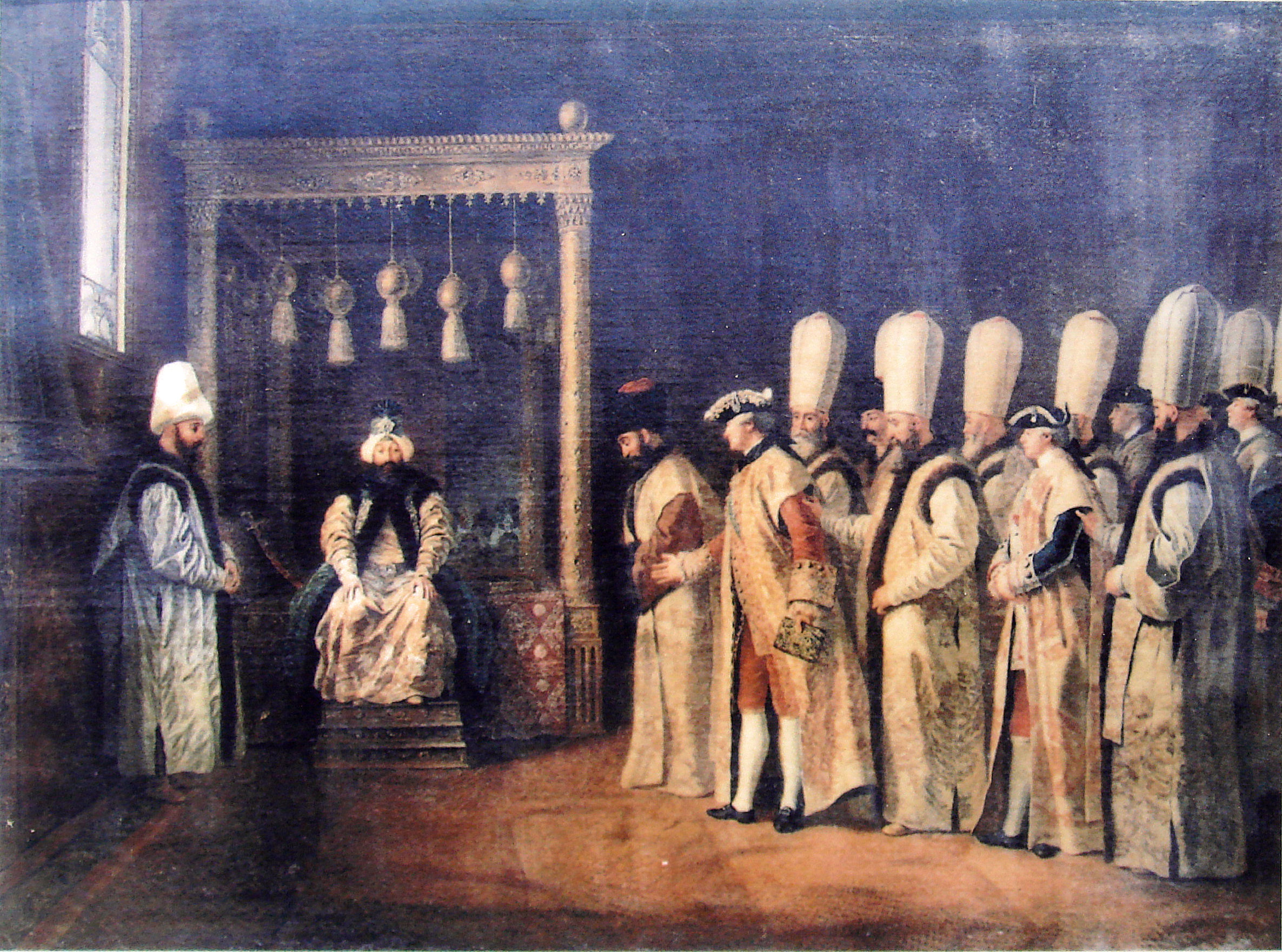
Ottoman Porte, 1767, gateway to trade with the Levant. Painting by Antoine de Favray.

Elizabeth I of England, primarily interested in trade with the east, collaborated with English merchants to form the first trading companies to the far-flung regions, using their own jargon. Their goals were to obtain trading concessions by treaty. The queen chartered the Company of Merchants of the Levant, shortened to Levant Company, and soon known also as The Turkey Company, in 1581. In 1582, the ship The Great Susan transported the first ambassador, William Harebone, to the Ottoman Porte (government of the Ottoman Empire) at Constantinople. Compared to Anatolia, Levant also means "land of the rising sun", but where Anatolia always only meant the projection of land currently occupied by the Republic of Turkey, Levant meant anywhere in the domain ruled by the Ottoman Porte. The East India Company (Originally charted as the "Governor and Company of Merchants of London Trading into the East-Indies") was chartered in 1600 for trade to the East Indies.

It has pleased western historians to write of a decline of the Ottoman Empire as though a stable and uncontested polity of that name once existed. The borders did expand and contract but they were always dynamic and always in "question" right from the beginning. The Ottoman Empire was created from the lands of the former eastern Roman Empire on the occasion of the latter's violent demise. The last Roman emperor died fighting hand-to-hand in the streets of his capital, Constantinople, overwhelmed by the Ottoman military, in May 1453. The victors inherited his remaining territory in the Balkans.

The Hungarian lands under Turkish rule had become part of the Habsburg monarchy by 1688 following the Great Turkish War. The Serbian Revolution in 1804–1833 created the Principality of Serbia. The Greek War of Independence in 1821–1832 created the Kingdom of Greece, which recovered most of the lands of ancient Greece, but could not gain Constantinople. The Ottoman Porte was continuously under attack from some quarter in its empire, primarily the Balkans. Also, on a number of occasions in the early 19th century, American and British warships had to attack the Barbary corsairs to stop their piracy and recover thousands of enslaved Europeans and Americans, particularly in the First and Second Barbary Wars.

In 1853, the Russian Empire, on behalf of the Slavic Balkan states began to question the very existence of the Ottoman Empire. The result was the Crimean War, 1853–1856, in which the British Empire and the French Empire supported the Ottoman Empire in its struggle against the incursions of the Russian Empire. Eventually, the Ottoman Empire lost control of the Balkan region.

=== Original diplomatic concept of Near East ===
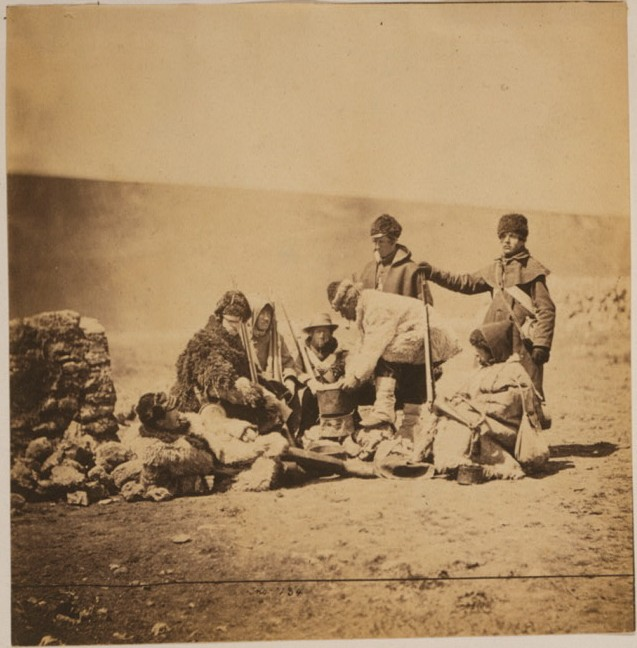
British troops, Crimea, 1855

Until about 1855, the terms Near East and Far East did not refer to any particular region. The Far East, a phrase containing a noun, East, qualified by an adjective, far, could be at any location in the "far east" of the speaker's home territory. The Ottoman Empire, for example, was the far East as much as the East Indies. The Crimean War brought a change in vocabulary with the introduction of terms more familiar to the late 19th century. The Russian Empire had entered a more aggressive phase, becoming militarily active against the Ottoman Empire and also against China, with territorial aggrandizement explicitly in mind. Rethinking its policy the British government decided that the two polities under attack were necessary for the balance of power. It therefore undertook to oppose the Russians in both places, one result being the Crimean War. During that war the administration of the British Empire began promulgating a new vocabulary, giving specific regional meaning to the Near East, the Ottoman Empire, and the Far East, the East Indies. The two terms were now compound nouns often shown hyphenated.

In 1855, a reprint of a letter earlier sent to The Times appeared in Littell's Living Age. Its author, an "official Chinese interpreter of 10 years' active service" and a member of the Oriental Club, Thomas Taylor Meadows, was replying to the suggestion by another interpreter that the British Empire was wasting its resources on a false threat from Russia against China. Toward the end of the letter he said:

To support the "sick man" in the Near East is an arduous and costly affair; let England, France and America too, beware how they create a "sick giant" in the Far East, for they may rest assured that, if Turkey is [a] European necessity, China is a world necessity.

Much of the colonial administration belonged to this club, which had been formed by the Duke of Wellington. Meadows' terminology must represent usage by that administration. If not the first use of the terms, the letter to the Times was certainly one of the earliest presentations of this vocabulary to the general public. They became immediately popular, supplanting "Levant" and "East Indies", which gradually receded to minor usages and then began to change meaning.

=== Original archaeological concept of Nearer East ===
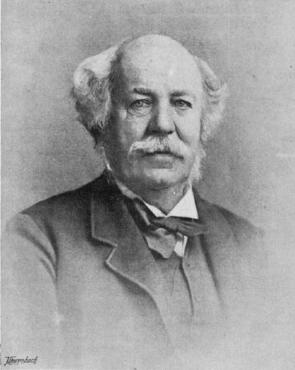
Rawlinson

Near East remained popular in diplomatic, trade and journalistic circles, but a variation soon developed among the scholars, priests and their associates: the Nearer East, reverting to the classical and then more scholarly distinction of nearer and farther. They undoubtedly saw a need to separate the biblical lands from the terrain of the Ottoman Empire. The Christians saw the country as the land of the Old and New Testaments, where Christianity had developed. The scholars in the field of studies that eventually became biblical archaeology attempted to define it on the basis of archaeology.

For example, The London Review of 1861 (Telford and Barber, unsigned) in reviewing several works by Rawlinson, Layard and others, defined themselves as making: "... an imperfect conspectus of the arrow-headed writings of the nearer east; writings which cover nearly the whole period of the postdiluvian Old Testament history ..." By arrow-headed writings they meant cuneiform texts. In defense of the Bible as history they said: "The primeval nations, that piled their glorious homes on the Euphrates, the Tigris, and the Nile, are among us again with their archives in their hands; ..." They further defined the nations as "... the countries lying between the Caspian, the Persian Gulf, and the Mediterranean ..." The regions in their inventory were Assyria, Chaldea, Mesopotamia, Persia, Armenia, Egypt, Arabia, Syria, Ancient Israel, Ethiopia, Caucasus, Libya, Anatolia and Abyssinia. Explicitly excluded is India. No mention is made of the Balkans.

The British archaeologist D. G. Hogarth published The Nearer East in 1902, in which he stated his view of the Near East:

The Nearer East is a term of current fashion for a region which our grandfathers were content to call simply The East. Its area is generally understood to coincide with those classic lands, historically the most interesting on the surface of the globe, which lie about the eastern basin of the Mediterranean Sea; but few probably could say offhand where should be the limits and why.

Hogarth then proceeds to say where and why in some detail, but no more mention is made of the classics. His analysis is geopolitical. His map delineates the Nearer East with regular lines as though surveyed. They include Iran, the Balkans, but not the Danube lands, Egypt, but not the rest of North Africa. Except for the Balkans, the region matches the later Middle East. It differs from the Ottoman Empire of the times in including Greece and Iran. Hogarth gives no evidence of being familiar with the contemporaneous initial concept of the Middle East.

=== Balkan confusion ===
In the last years of the 19th century, the term Near East acquired considerable disrepute in eyes of the English-speaking public as did the Ottoman Empire itself. The cause of the onus was the religiously motivated Hamidian Massacres of Christian Armenians, but it seemed to spill over into the protracted conflicts of the Balkans. For a time, Near East often included the Balkans. Robert Hichens' 1913 book The Near East is subtitled "Dalmatia, Greece and Constantinople".

==== Sir Henry Norman and his first wife ====
The change is evident in the reports of influential British travelers to the Balkans. In 1894, Sir Henry Norman, 1st Baronet, a journalist, traveled to the Far East, afterwards writing a book called The Peoples and Politics of the Far East, which came out in 1895. By "Far East" he meant Siberia, China, Japan, Korea, Siam and Malaya. As the book was a big success, he was off to the Balkan states with his wife in 1896 to develop detail for a sequel, The People and Politics of the Near East, which Scribners planned to publish in 1897. Mrs. Norman, a writer herself, wrote glowing letters of the home and person of Mme. Zakki, "the wife of a Turkish cabinet minister," who, she said, was a cultivated woman living in a country home full of books. As for the natives of the Balkans, they were "a semi-civilized people".

The planned book was never published, however Norman published the gist of the book, mixed with vituperation against the Ottoman Empire, in an article in June 1896, in Scribner's Magazine. The empire had descended from an enlightened civilization ruling over barbarians for their own good to something considerably less. The difference was the Hamidian Massacres, which were being conducted even as the couple traveled the Balkans. According to Norman now, the empire had been established by "the Moslem horde" from Asia, which was stopped by "intrepid Hungary." Furthermore, "Greece shook off the turbaned destroyer of her people" and so on. The Russians were suddenly liberators of oppressed Balkan states. Having portrayed the Armenians as revolutionaries in the name of freedom with the expectation of being rescued by the intervention of Christian Europe, he states "but her hope was vain." England had "turned her back." Norman concluded his exhortation with "In the Balkans, one learns to hate the Turk." Norman made sure that Gladstone read the article. Prince Nicolas of Montenegro wrote a letter thanking him for his article.

Throughout this article, Norman uses "Near East" to mean the countries where "the eastern question" applied; that is, to all of the Balkans. The countries and regions mentioned are Greece, Bulgaria, Serbia, Bosnia-Herzegovina (which was Muslim and needed, in his view, to be suppressed), Macedonia, Montenegro, Albania, Romania. The rest of the Ottoman domain is demoted to just "the East".

==== William Miller ====
If Norman was apparently attempting to change British policy, it was perhaps William Miller (1864–1945), journalist and expert on the Near East, who did the most in that direction. In essence, he signed the death warrant, so to speak, of the Age of Empires. The fall of the Ottoman Empire ultimately enmeshed all the others as well. In the Travel and Politics in the Near East, 1898, Miller claimed to have made four trips to the Balkans, 1894, 1896, 1897 and 1898, and to be, in essence, an expert on "the Near East", by which he primarily meant the Balkans. Apart from the fact that he attended Oxford and played Rugby, not many biographical details have been promulgated. He was, in effect (whatever his formal associations if any), a point man of British Near Eastern intelligence.

In Miller's view, the Ottoman officials were unfit to rule:

The plain fact is that it is as hard for an Ottoman official to be honest as it is for a camel to enter through the eye of a needle. It is not so much the fault of the men as the fault of the system, which is thoroughly bad from top to bottom... Turkish administration is synonymous with corruption, inefficiency, and sloth.

These were fighting words to be coming from a country that once insisted Europe needed Turkey and was willing to spill blood over it. For his authority Miller invokes the people, citing the "collective wisdom" of Europe, and introducing a concept to arise many times in the decades to follow under chilling circumstances: "... no final solution of the difficulty has yet been found."

Miller's final pronouncements on the topic could not be ignored by either the British or the Ottoman governments:

It remains then to consider whether the Great Powers can solve the Eastern Question ... Foreigners find it extremely difficult to understand the foreign, and especially the Eastern policy of Great Britain, and we cannot wonder at their difficulty, for it seems a mass of contradictions to Englishmen themselves ... At one moment we are bringing about the independence of Greece by sending the Turkish fleet to the bottom of the bay of Navarino. Twenty-seven years later we are spending immense sums and wasting thousands of lives in order to protect the Turks against Russia.

If the British Empire was now going to side with the Russian Empire, the Ottoman Empire had no choice but to cultivate a relationship with the Austro-Hungarian Empire, which was supported by the German Empire. In a few years these alignments became the Triple Entente and the Triple Alliance (already formed in 1882), which were in part a cause of World War I. By its end in 1918 three empires were gone, a fourth was about to fall to revolution, and two more, the British and French, were forced to yield in revolutions started under the aegis of their own ideologies.

==== Arnold Toynbee ====
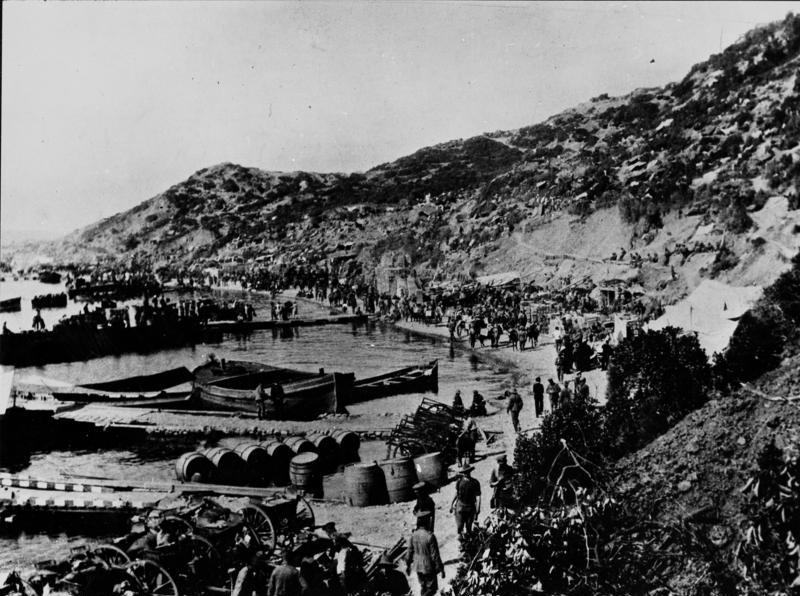
Australian troops, Gallipoli, 1915. The battle was an Ottoman victory.

By 1916, when millions of Europeans were becoming casualties of imperial war in the trenches of eastern and western Europe over "the eastern question", Arnold J. Toynbee, Hegelesque historian of civilization at large, was becoming metaphysical about the Near East. Geography alone was not a sufficient explanation of the terms, he believed. If the Ottoman Empire had been a sick man, then:

There has been something pathological about the history of this Near Eastern World. It has had an undue share of political misfortunes, and had lain for centuries in a kind of spiritual paralysis between East and West—belonging to neither, partaking paradoxically of both, and wholly unable to rally itself decidedly to one or the other.

Having supposed that it was sick, he kills it off: "The Near East has never been more true to itself than in its lurid dissolution; past and present are fused together in the flare." To Toynbee the Near East was a spiritual being of a "Janus-character", connected to both east and west:

The limits of the Near East are not easy to define. On the north-west, Vienna is the most conspicuous boundary-mark, but one might almost equally well single out Trieste or Lvov or even Prag. Towards the southeast, the boundaries are even more shadowy. It is perhaps best to equate them with the frontiers of the Arabic language, yet the genius of the Near East overrides linguistic barriers, and encroaches on the Arabicspeaking world on the one side as well as on the German-speaking world on the other. Syria is essentially a Near Eastern country, and a physical geographer would undoubtedly carry the Near Eastern frontiers up to the desert belt of the Sahara, Nefud and Kevir.

From the death of the Near East, new nations were able to rise from the ashes, notably the Republic of Turkey. Paradoxically it now aligned itself with the west rather than with the east. Mustafa Kemal, its founder, a former Ottoman high-ranking officer, was insistent on this social revolution, which, among other changes, liberated women from the strait rules still in effect in most Arabic-speaking countries. The demise of the political Near East now left a gap where it had been, into which stepped the Middle East.

=== Rise of the Middle East ===
==== Origin of the concept of Middle East ====
The term Middle East as a noun and adjective was common in the 19th century in nearly every context except diplomacy and archaeology. An uncountable number of places appear to have had their middle easts from gardens to regions, including the United States. The innovation of the term Near East to mean the holdings of the Ottoman Empire as early as the Crimean War had left a geographical gap. The East Indies, or "Far East", derived ultimately from Ptolemy's "India Beyond the Ganges." The Ottoman Empire ended at the eastern border of Iraq. "India This Side of the Ganges" and Iran had been omitted. The archaeologists counted Iran as the Near East because Old Persian cuneiform had been found there. This usage did not sit well with the diplomats; India was left in an equivocal state. They needed a regional term.

The use of the term Middle East as a region of international affairs apparently began in British and American diplomatic circles quite independently of each other over concern for the security of the same country: Iran, then known to the west as Persia. In 1900 Thomas Edward Gordon published an article, The Problem of the Middle East, which began:

It may be assumed that the most sensitive part of our external policy in the Middle East is the preservation of the independence and integrity of Persia and Afghanistan. Our active interest in Persia began with the present century, and was due to the belief that the invasion of India by a European Power was a probable event.

The threat that caused Gordon, diplomat and military officer, to publish the article was resumption of work on a railway from Russia to the Persian Gulf. Gordon, a published author, had not used the term previously, but he was to use it from then on.

A second strategic personality from American diplomatic and military circles, Alfred Thayer Mahan, concerned about the naval vulnerability of the trade routes in the Persian Gulf and Indian Ocean, commented in 1902:

The middle East, if I may adopt a term which I have not seen, will some day need its Malta, as well as its Gibraltar; it does not follow that either will be in the Gulf. Naval force has the quality of mobility which carries with it the privilege of temporary absences; but it needs to find on every scene of operation established bases of refit, of supply, and, in case of disaster, of security. The British Navy should have the facility to concentrate in force, if occasion arise, about Aden, India, and the Gulf.

Apparently the sailor did not connect with the soldier, as Mahan believed he was innovating the term Middle East. It was, however, already there to be seen.

==== Single region concept ====
Until the interwar period following the First World War, the terms Near East and Middle East co-existed, but they were not always seen as distinct in the eyes of Western commentators. Bertram Lenox Simpson, a journalist who served for a period as an officer for the Chinese Maritime Customs Service, combined both terms in his 1910 work The Conflict of Colour: The Threatened Upheaval Throughout the World as "the Near and Middle East." According to Simpson, the combined region consisted of "India, Afghanistan, Persia, Arabistan, Asia Minor, and last, but not least, Egypt", explaining that the aforementioned regions were in actuality "politically one region – in spite of the divisions into which it is academically divided."

In The Conflict of Colour, Simpson argued that what united these regions was their skin color and the fact that they were all under European colonial rule. The work included a "color chart" of the world, dividing it into a spectrum of 'black', 'brown', 'yellow' and 'white' races. Simpson also modified the Eastern Question (a diplomatic issue concerning the waning of the Ottoman Empire in the 19th century) to the "Problem of the Nearer East", which he rephrased around the issue of the future of European colonialism in the Near East, writing that in regards to "the white man":

... in India, in Central Asia, and in all the regions adjacent to the Near East, he still boldly remains a conqueror in possession of vast stretches of valuable territory; a conqueror who has no intention of lightly surrendering his conquests, and who indeed sees in every attempt to modify the old order of things a most hateful and unjustifiable revolt which must at all costs be repressed. This is so absolutely true that no candid person will be inclined to dispute it.

The spirit of the Crusaders may thus be said still to linger in those latitudes which, to give geographical and political cohesion, are here broadly named the Middle and Near East; and, to use a somewhat dangerous but illuminating figure of speech, it may be even be maintained that to-day, as of old, the white man and the Cross remain as blindly opposed to the brown man and Islamism, Hinduism and what these creeds postulate, as the most uncompromising bigot could desire.

According to Simpson, the reason why the "Problem of the Nearer East" remained so misunderstood in the Western world (compared to diplomatic and political issues in the Near East) was due to the fact that "there is no good work dealing with these problems as one whole, and much misunderstanding consequently exists."

==== One presumed region, one name ====
The term Near and Middle East, held the stage for a few years before World War I. It proved to be less acceptable to a colonial point of view that saw the entire region as one. In 1916 Captain T. C. Fowle, 40th Pathans (troops of British India), wrote of a trip he had taken from Karachi to Syria just before the war. The book does not contain a single instance of Near East. Instead, the entire region is considered the Middle East. The formerly Near Eastern sections of his trip are now "Turkish" and not Ottoman.

Subsequently, with the disgrace of Near East in diplomatic and military circles, Middle East prevailed. However, Near East continues in some circles at the discretion of the defining agency or academic department. They are not generally considered distinct regions as they were at their original definition.

Although racial and colonial definitions of the Middle East are no longer considered ideologically sound, the sentiment of unity persists. For much, but by no means all, of the Middle East, the predominance of Islam lends some unity, as does the accident of geographical continuity. Otherwise there is but little basis except for history and convention to lump together peoples of multiple, often unrelated languages, governments, loyalties and customs.

== Current meaning ==
Maunsell's map, a Pre-World War I British Ethnographical Map of the Near East

=== Diplomatic ===
In the 20th century, subsequent to major warfare and decades of intense political turmoil, the terms such as Near East, Far East, and Middle East continued to be used, but evolved in their meaning and scope. This increased confusion, the resolution of which became the study of experts in the new field of political science. The new wave of diplomats often came from those programmes.

Archaeology on the international scene, though very much of intellectual interest to major universities, was overshadowed by international relations. The archaeologists' domain became the ancient Near East, which could no longer be relied upon to be the actual Near East. The Ottoman Empire was gone, along with all the other empires of the 19th century, replaced in the region with a number of republics with various affinities, regional and global.

The many and varied specialized agencies that were formed to handle specific aspects of complex international relations, evolved with the terms. Definitions from the present came to be not in concert with those of the past. Reconciling these terms and their definitions remains difficult due to ongoing territorial disputes and non-free nuclear powers' territorial ambitions, putting any reconciliation of definitions out of scope of diplomatic corps in the classical sense.

The ancient Near East is frozen in time. The living Near East is primarily what the agencies each define as a matter of practice; often guided by their political leadership. In most cases, this single term is inadequate to describe the geographical range in practical applications. This has resulted is multiple definitions used differently by each major region, power, or institution.

==== Influential agencies represented in the table ====
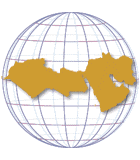
Logotype of the Bureau of Near Eastern Affairs

The United States is the chief remaining nation to assign official responsibilities to a region called the Near East. Within the government the State Department has been most influential in promulgating the Near Eastern regional system. The countries of the former empires of the 19th century have in general abandoned the term and the subdivision in favor of Middle East, North Africa, and various forms of Asia. In many cases, such as France, no distinct regional substructures have been employed. Each country has its own French diplomatic apparatus, although regional terms, including Proche-Orient and Moyen-Orient, can be used in a descriptive sense.

Some of the most influential agencies in the United States still use Near East as a working concept. For example, the Bureau of Near Eastern Affairs, a division of the United States Department of State, is perhaps the most influential agency to still use the term Near East. Under the Secretary of State, it implements the official diplomacy of the United States, called also statecraft by Secretary Hillary Clinton. The name of the bureau is traditional and historic. There is, however, no distinct Middle East. All official Middle Eastern affairs are referred to this bureau.

Working closely in conjunction with the definition of the Near East provided by the State Department is the Near East South Asia Center for Strategic Studies (NESA), an educational institution of the United States Department of Defense. It teaches courses and holds seminars and workshops for government officials and military officers who will work or are working within its region. As the name indicates, that region is a combination of State Department regions; however, NESA is careful to identify the State Department region. As its Near East is not different from the State Department's it does not appear in the table. Its name, however, is not entirely accurate. For example, its region includes Mauritania, a member of the State Department's Africa (Sub-Sahara).

The Washington Institute for Near East Policy (WINEP) is a non-profit organization for research and advice on Middle Eastern policy. It regards its target countries as the Middle East but adopts the convention of calling them the Near East to be in conformance with the practices of the State Department. Its views are independent. The WINEP bundles the countries of Northwest Africa together under "North Africa". Details can be found in Policy Focus #65.

==== Table of Near Eastern countries recognized by various agencies ====
Country or region	UN Food and Agriculture Organization	Encyclopædia Britannica	National Geographic	United States Department of State	Washington Institute for Near East Policy
Armenia	✓	✓	✓	✓	✓
Afghanistan	✓	✗	✗	✗	✗
Algeria	✗	✗	✗	✓	✓
Bahrain	✓	✓	✓	✓	
Cyprus	✓	✓	✓	✗	✗
Egypt	✓	✓	✓	✓	✓
Iran	✓	✓	✓	✓	✓
Iraq	✓	✓	✓	✓	✓
Israel	✓	✓	✓	✓	
Jordan	✓	✓	✓	✓	
Kuwait	✓	✓	✓	✓	✓
Lebanon	✓	✓	✓	✓	✓
Libya	✗	✓	✗	✓	✓
Mauritania	✗	✗	✗	✗	✓
Morocco	✗	✗	✗	✓	✓
Oman	✓	✓	✓	✓	✓
Palestinian territories	✗	✓	✓	✓	✓
Pakistan	✗	✓	✓	✓	✓
Qatar	✓	✓	✓	✓	✓
Saudi Arabia	✓	✓	✓	✓	✓
Syria	✓	✓	✓	✓	✓
Tunisia	✗	✗	✗	✓	✓
Turkey	✓	✓	✓	✓	✓
United Arab Emirates	✓	✓	✓	✓	✓
Yemen	✓	✓	✓	✓	✓

Legend: ✓ included; ✗ excluded

==== Other regional systems ====
The United Nations formulates multiple regional divisions as is convenient for its various operations. But few of them include a Near East, and that poorly defined. UNICEF recognizes the "Middle East and North Africa" region, where the Middle East is bounded by the Red Sea on the west and includes Iran on the east. UNESCO recognizes neither a Near East nor a Middle East, dividing the countries instead among three regions: Arab States, Asia and the Pacific, and Africa. Its division "does not forcibly reflect geography" but "refers to the execution of regional activities." The United Nations Statistics Division defines West Asia to contain the countries included elsewhere in the Middle East. Its total area extends further into Central Asia than that of most agencies.

The Directorate of Intelligence, one of four directorates into which the US Central Intelligence Agency (CIA) is divided, includes the Office of Near Eastern and South Asian Analysis (NESA). Its duties are defined as "support on Middle Eastern and North African countries, as well as on the South Asian nations of India, Pakistan, and Afghanistan." The combined range of countries is in fact the same as the State Department's Near East, but the names do not correspond. The Near East of the NESA is the same as the Middle East defined in the CIA-published on-line resource, The World Factbook. Its list of countries is limited by the Red Sea, comprises the entire eastern coast of the Mediterranean, including Israel, Turkey, the small nations of the Caucasus, Iran and the states of the Arabian Peninsula.

The US Agency for International Development (USAID), an independent agency under the Department of State established in place of the Marshall Plan for the purpose of determining and distributing foreign aid, does not use the term Near East. Its definition of Middle East corresponds to that of the State Department, which officially prefers the term Near East.

The Foreign and Commonwealth Office of United Kingdom recognises a Middle East and North Africa region, but not a Near East. Their original Middle East consumed the Near East as far as the Red Sea, ceded India to the Asia and Oceania region, and went into partnership with North Africa as far as the Atlantic.

The Ministry of Foreign Affairs of the Hellenic Republic conducts "bilateral relationships" with the countries of the "Mediterranean – Middle East Region" but has formulated no Near East Region. The Ministry of Foreign Affairs of the Republic of Turkey also does not use the term Near East. Its regions include the Middle East, the Balkans and others.

=== Archaeological ===
The ancient Near East is a term of the 20th century intended to stabilize the geographical application of Near East to ancient history. The Near East may acquire varying meanings, but the ancient Near East always has the same meaning: the ancient nations, people and languages of the enhanced Fertile Crescent; a sweep of land from the Nile Valley through Anatolia and southward to the limits of Mesopotamia.

Resorting to this verbal device, however, did not protect the ancient Near East from the inroads of the Middle East. For example, a high point in the use of ancient Near East for Biblical scholars was the Ancient Near Eastern Texts relating to the Old Testament by James Bennett Pritchard, a textbook of first edition dated 1950. The last great book written by Leonard Woolley, British archaeologist, excavator of ancient Ur and associate of T. E. Lawrence and Arthur Evans, was The Art of the Middle East, Including Persia, Mesopotamia and Palestine, published in 1961. Woolley had completed it in 1960 two weeks before his death. The geographical ranges in each case are identical.

Parallel with the growth of specialized agencies for conducting or supporting statescraft in the second half of the 20th century has been the collection of resources for scholarship and research typically in university settings. Most universities teaching the liberal arts have library and museum collections. These are not new; however, the erection of these into "centres" of national and international interest in the second half of the 20th century have created larger databases not available to the scholars of the past. Many of these focus on the ancient Near East or Near East in the sense of ancient Near East.

One such institution is the Centre for the Study of Ancient Documents (CSAD) founded by and located centrally at Oxford University, Great Britain. Among its many activities CSAD numbers "a long-term project to create a library of digitised images of Greek inscriptions." These it arranges by region. The Egypt and the Near East region besides Egypt includes Cyprus, Persia and Afghanistan but not Asia Minor (a separate region).

=== Academic ===
A large percentage of experts on the modern Middle East began their training in university departments named for the Near East. Similarly the journals associated with these fields of expertise include the words Near East or Near Eastern. The meaning of Near East in these numerous establishments and publications is Middle East. Expertise on the modern Middle East is almost never mixed or confused with studies of the ancient Near East, although often ancient Near East is abbreviated to Near East without any implication of modern times. For example, Near Eastern languages in the ancient sense includes such languages as Sumerian and Akkadian. In the modern sense, it is likely to mean any or all of the Arabic languages.

== See also ==
Region

- Ancient Near East
- Northeast Africa
- Intermediate Region
- Eastern Mediterranean
- Fertile Crescent
- Syria (region)
- Levant
- Mashriq
- Mesopotamia
- Middle East
- South Caucasus
- West Asia
- MENA

Academic studies

- Genetic history of the Middle East
- Genetic history of Africa
- Middle Eastern studies
- Near Eastern archaeology
- Oriental studies
