= John James Hood Gordon =

General in the British Army

General Sir John James Hood Gordon GCB
- Born: 12 January 1832
- Died: 2 November 1908 (aged 76); Edinburgh, Scotland
- Burial place: Dean Cemetery
- Education: Scottish Naval and Military Academy
- Spouse: Ella Gordon (m. 1871–1903)
- Children: two
- Relatives: Sir Thomas Edward Gordon, twin brother; Edward Strathearn Gordon, cousin and father-in-law
- Military career
- Allegiance: United Kingdom
- Service: British Army (East India Company) Bengal Army
- Service years: 1849–1908
- Rank: General
- Commands: 29th Punjabis (1875–1879); Bengal Army brigade (1882–1887)
- Other work: Assistant Military Secretary to the India Office (1890–96); Council of India (1897–1907)

General Sir John James Hood Gordon GCB (12 January 1832 – 2 November 1908) was a general in the British Army.

== Early life ==
Gordon was born on 12 January 1832 in Aberdeen and was a twin son of Captain William Gordon (1788–1834) of the 2nd Queen's Royal Regiment. His father had served in the Peninsular War and was married at Santarém, in 1818, to Marianna Carlotta Loi Gonçalves de Mello, daughter of Luiz Gonçalves de Mello, a Spanish government official in the province of Estremadura.

His father William Gordon was one of the sons of Adam Gordon (1750–1831) of Griamachary in the parish of Kildonan, Dingwall, whose sons and grandsons included thirteen commissioned officers, a Surgeon-General, Huntly George Gordon; and a Lord Advocate and MP, Edward Gordon, Baron Gordon of Drumearn.

He and his twin brother, Sir Thomas Edward Gordon, were the youngest children in a family of four sons and a daughter. John was educated at Dalmeny and at the Scottish Naval and Military Academy, Edinburgh. Thomas Edward and John joined the British Army on the same day; both became generals and were knighted.

== Army career ==
With his twin, he entered the British Army, purchasing a commission in the 74th (Highland) Regiment of Foot on 21 August 1849 and transferred to 29th Foot in October 1849.

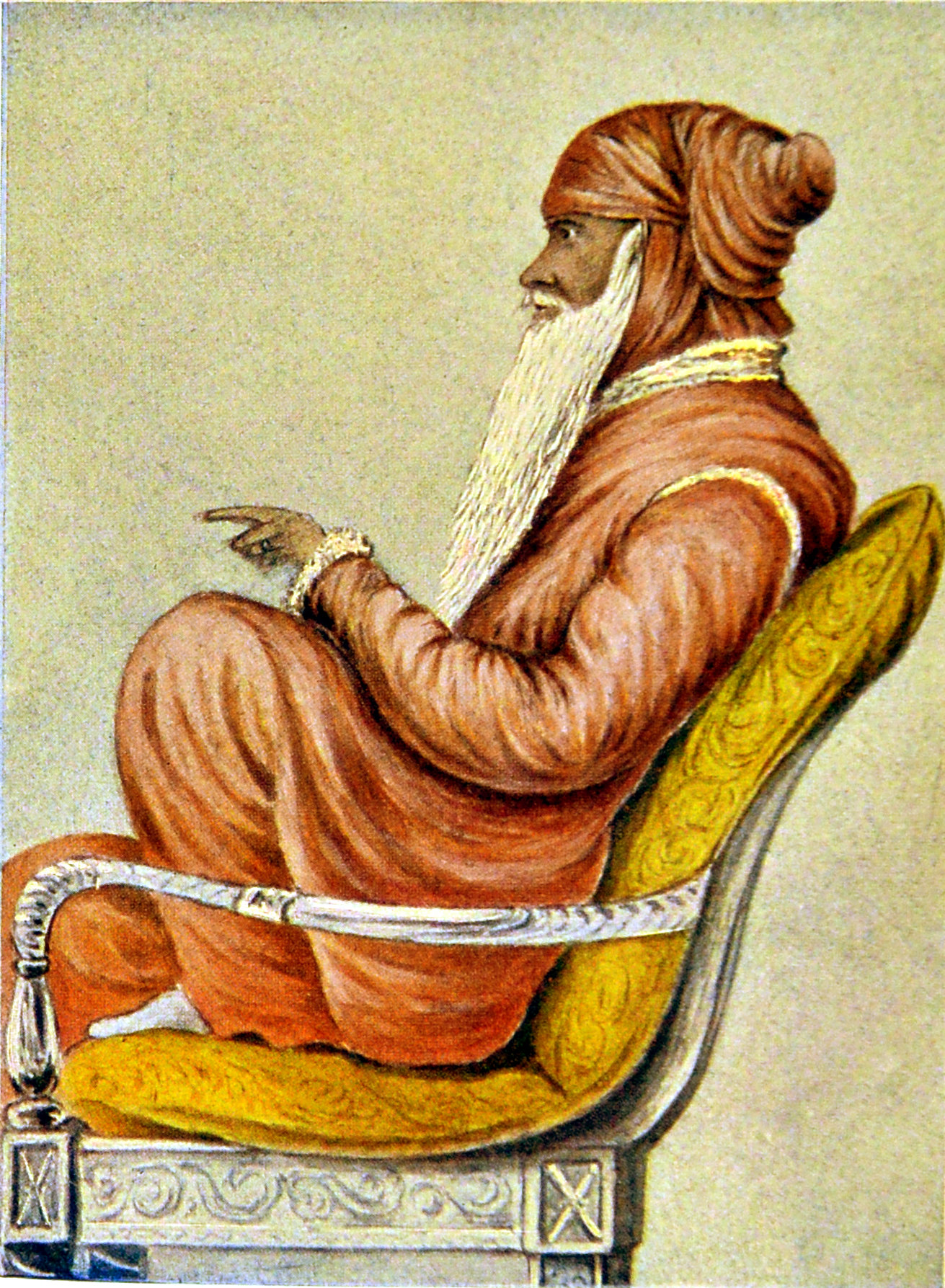
Frontispiece from The Sikhs; Ranjit Singh by Gordon after a 1838 sketch by Emily Eden

He served in the Indian Mutiny campaign of 1857–8 with the Jaunpur field force, attached to 97th Regiment. He was at the actions of Nasrutpur, Chanda (31 October), Ameerpur, and Sultanpur, at the siege and capture of Lucknow, and storming of the Kaisarbagh. The medal with clasp was awarded him. From September 1858 to April 1859 he acted as field-adjutant to Colonel (Sir) William Turner, commanding the troops on the Grand Trunk Road, near Benares, and the field force during operations in Shahabad. He was engaged in the final attack on Jugdespur, and in the action of Nowadi, and the subsequent pursuit. Mentioned in despatches, he was promoted captain on 2 December 1859, and was made brevet-major on 30 November 1860. Gordon performed regimental duty in India for the next eighteen years; he was promoted major in 1860 and exchanged into the 46th Regiment. Subsequently, he was given the command of the 29th Punjab Infantry, becoming lieutenant-colonel on 21 August 1875, and brevet colonel on 23 February 1877. He served with the Jowaki Expedition in 1877–8, and was mentioned in despatches three times, receiving the Indian Mutiny Medal and clasp.

In the Second Anglo-Afghan War of 1878-9 he played a prominent part, commanding the 29th Punjabis, attached to the Kurram Valley column. He led a reconnaissance in force at Habib Kila on 28 November 1878, and discovered that the Afghans, so far from abandoning their guns as had been reported, had taken up a strong position on the top of the pass. Gordon's report made Sir Frederick Roberts abandon a frontal attack on the Peiwar Kotal Pass. Gordon's regiment formed the advance guard in the turning movement on the Spingawi Kotal on 2 December. During the night march some Pathans of the 29th Punjab infantry fired signal shots to warn the enemy of the British advance and the regiment was immediately displaced from its leading position. Subsequently, he was engaged in the Zaimukht expedition, including the assault of Zava, where he commanded the right column of General Tytler's force. For his services in the Afghan war he received the Afghanistan Medal with clasp and was made CB in 1879. In expeditions to Karmana and against the Malikshahi Waziris in 1880 he was brigadier-general in command of the troops. He also served in the Mahsud Waziria expedition in 1881, when he commanded the second column; he was again mentioned in despatches and was thanked by the government of India. From 1882 to 1887 he commanded a brigade of the Bengal Army, and was made major-general on 20 December 1886.

In the Third Anglo-Burmese War he commanded his brigade (1886–87) and conducted the operations which opened up the country between Manipur and Kendat. A road was laid out in 1887 by troops under Gordon to link Manipur with Upper Burma and the Chindwin River. He wrote an account "Overland from India to Upper Burma", published in The Illustrated Naval and Military Magazine in February 1889.

Returning to the UK, he was made assistant military secretary to the India Office in 1890, and retained the office until 1896, under Major-General Oliver Newmarch. He was promoted lieutenant-general in 1891 and full general on 1 April 1894. On 1 January 1897 he was nominated a member of the Council of India and served for ten years. He was advanced to Knight Commander of the Order of the Bath (KCB) in 1898, and to Knight Grand Cross (GCB) in 1908.

== Personal life ==
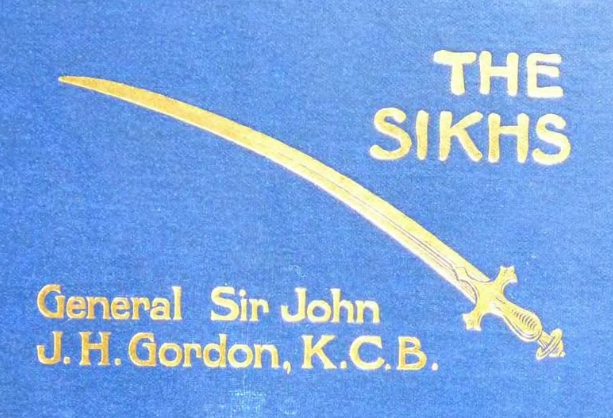
The Sikhs cover

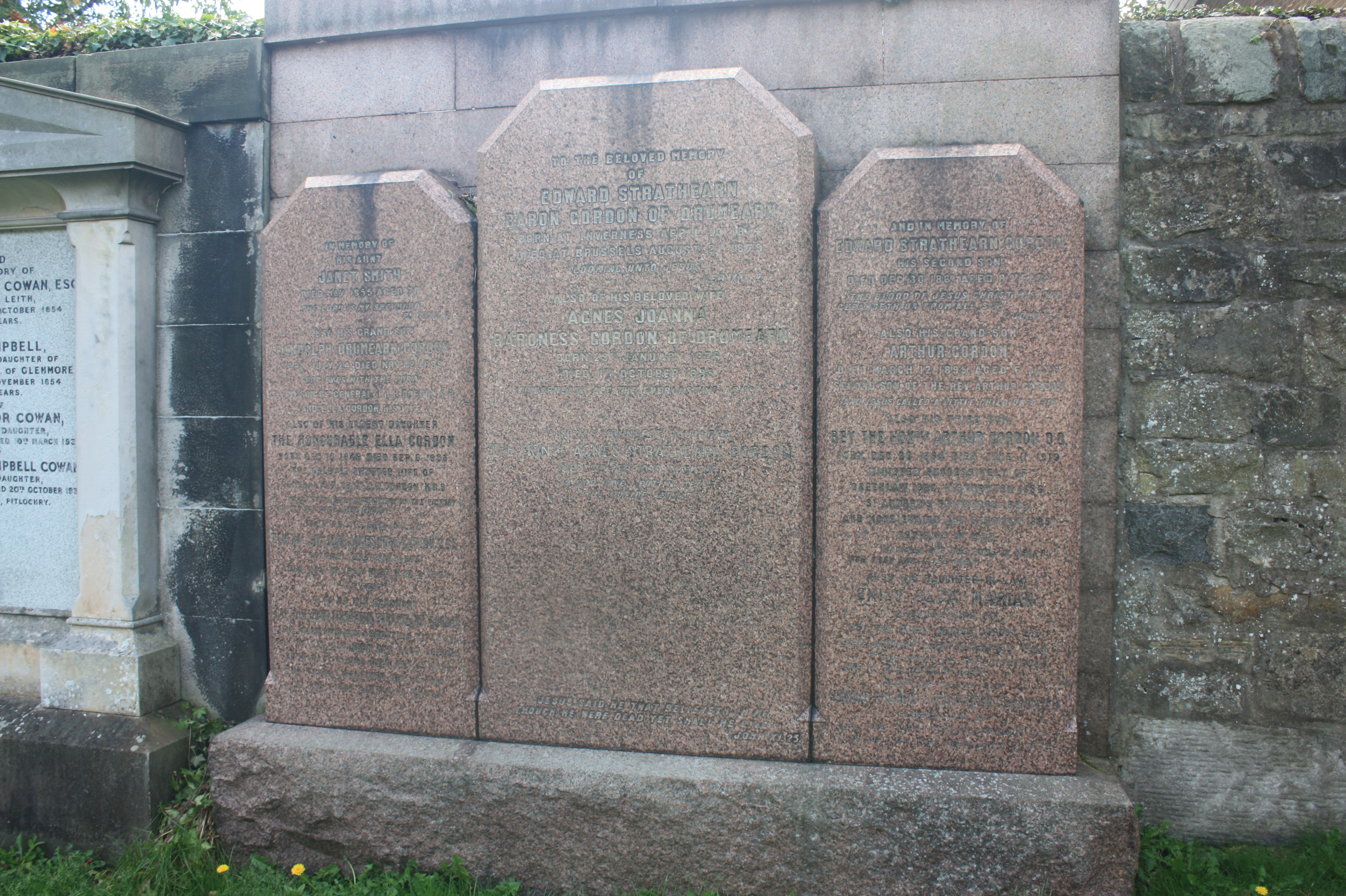
The Gordon family monument, Dean Cemetery, Edinburgh

He married in 1871 Ella (1846 – 1903), daughter of his cousin Edward Gordon, Baron Gordon of Drumearn, lord of appeal in ordinary. Both their sons who survived to adulthood, Edward Ian Drumearn Gordon and John Frederick Strathearn Gordon, were army officers; John was killed in the First World War.

Gordon wrote and illustrated The Sikhs (1904).

He resided in his last years at 35 Onslow Square, London and Magdala Crescent, Edinburgh. He died at Edinburgh on 2 November 1908; he was buried in Dean Cemetery there and is commemorated with family members against the original west boundary wall of the cemetery.
