= Mount Donna Buang =

Mountain in Victoria, Australia

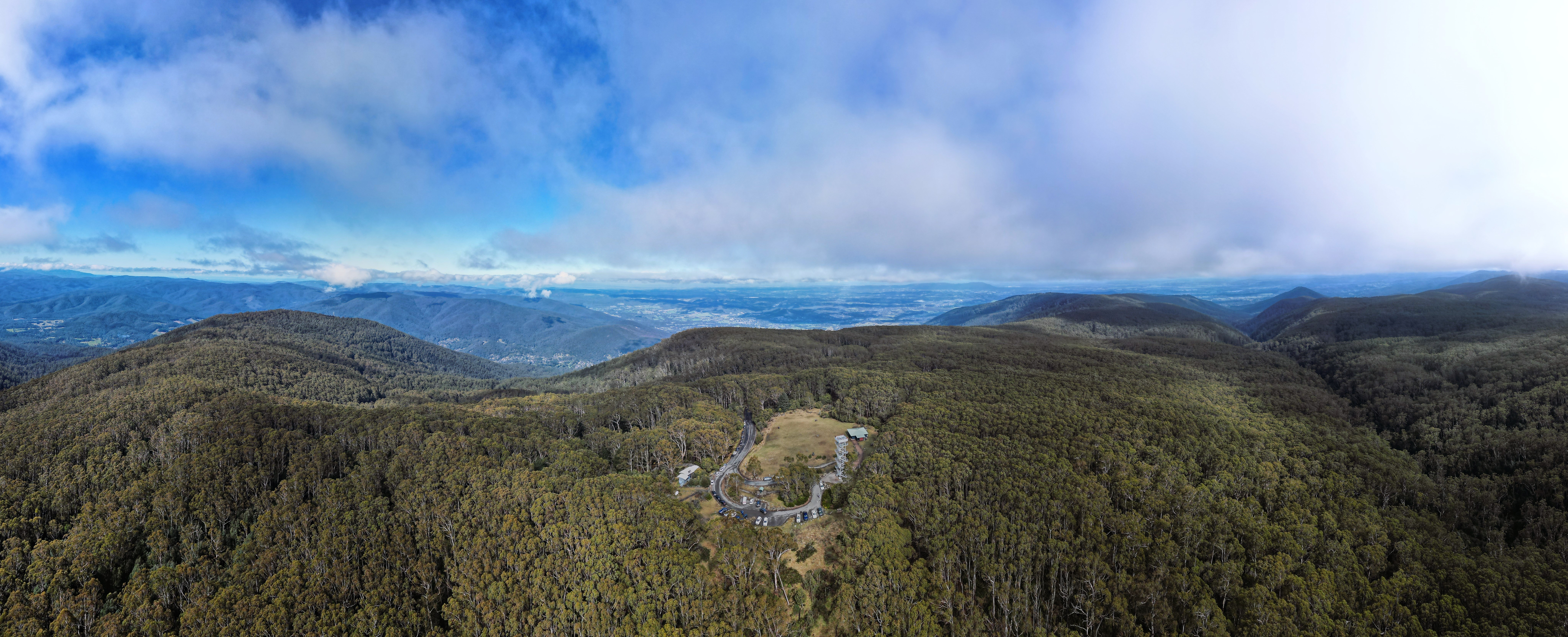
- Aerial view of Mount Donna Buang

Highest point
- Elevation: 1,250 m (4,100 ft)
- Prominence: 470 m (1,540 ft)
- Isolation: 10.4 km (6.5 mi)
- Listing: List of mountains in Australia
- Coordinates: 37°42′23″S 145°40′52″E

Geography
- Location within Victoria
- Country: Australia
- State: Victoria
- Protected area: Yarra Ranges National Park
- Parent range: Victorian Alps, Great Dividing Range

Mount Donna Buang ("the body of the mountain" in the language of the Wurundjeri people) is a mountain in the southern reaches of the Victorian Alps of the Great Dividing Range, located in the Australian state of Victoria. Approximately 94 kilometres (58 mi) from Melbourne with an elevation of 1,250 metres (4,101 ft), Mount Donna Buang is the closest snowfield to Melbourne.

== Location and features ==
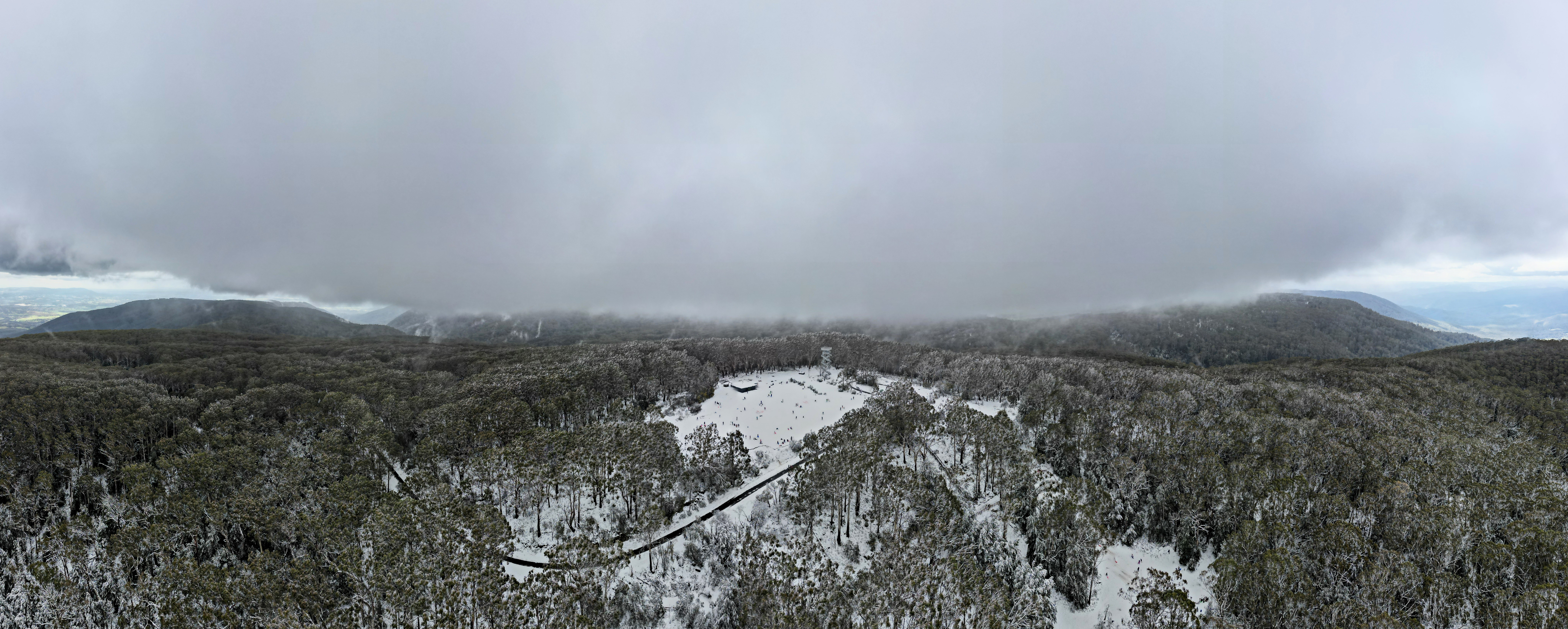
Aerial panorama of Mount Donna Buang's observation tower. Post-winter snow. Shot on 9 September 2023.

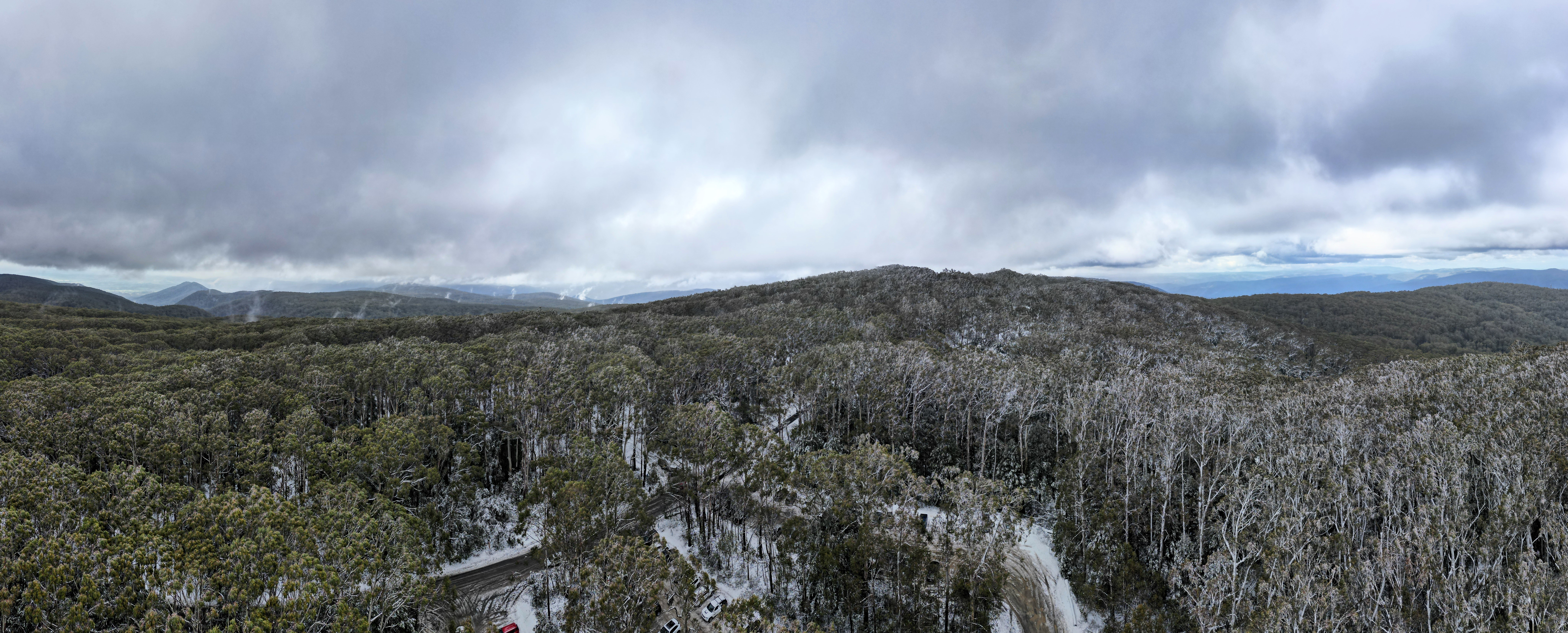
Aerial panorama of Mount Donna Buang. Flurry of snow in early spring. Shot on 9 September 2023.

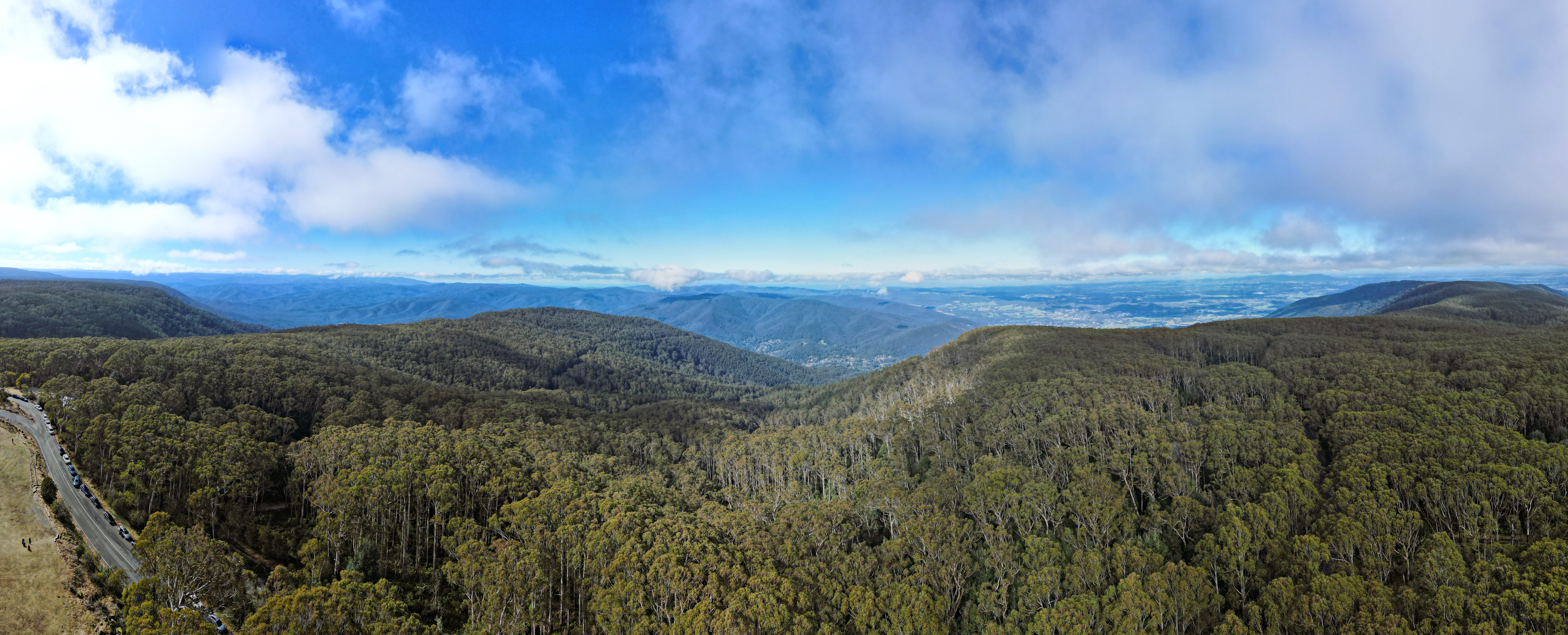
Mount Donna Buang from above. August 2022.

In winter, it usually receives snow suitable for snow play and tobogganing, and during the non-winter months the area is well visited by bushwalkers and cyclists. The summit of Mount Donna Buang is surrounded by alpine ash (or woollybutt) trees and sub-alpine snow gums, and at nearby Cement Creek there is a canopy walkway through myrtle beech and mountain ash trees known as the Mount Donna Buang Skywalk.

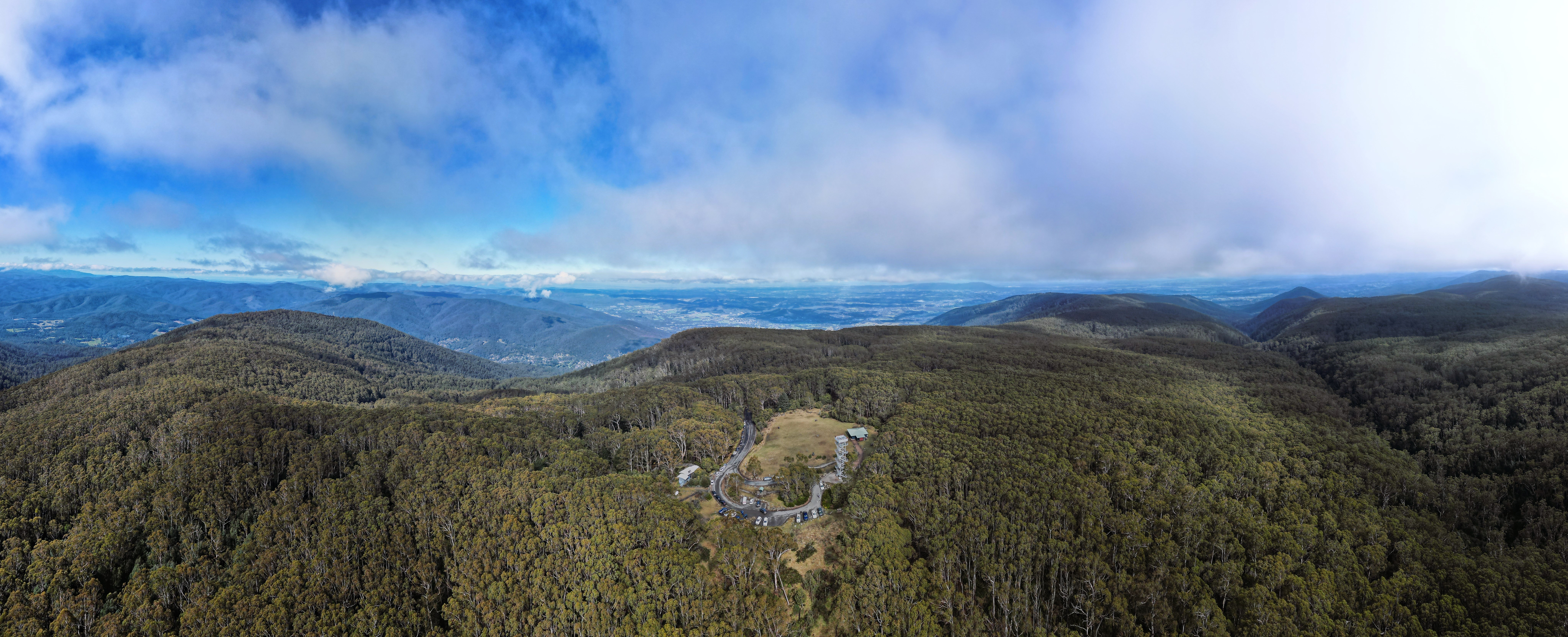
Mount Donna Buang with its 21m high observation tower. August 2022.

Mount Donna Buang is part of the Yarra Ranges National Park (established in 1995). The nearest serviced town to the mountain is Warburton.

== Flora and fauna ==
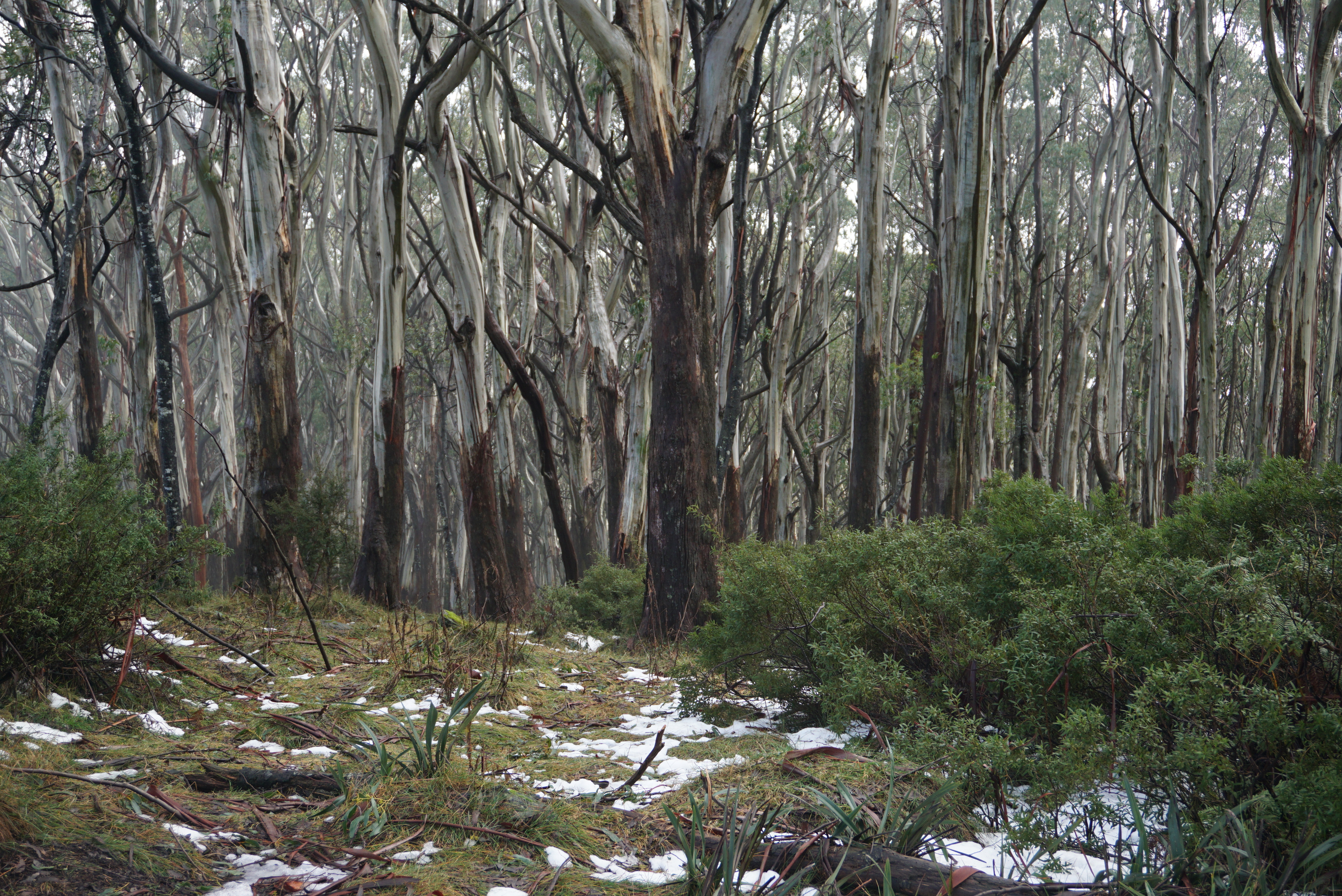
Eucalyptus trees at Mount Donna Buang

The lower and middle slopes of the mountain are characterised by very tall forests of mountain ash with a cool temperate rainforest mid-story on the southern slopes and sheltered areas elsewhere on the mountain. Trees such as myrtle beech, sassafras and soft tree fern as well as large shrubs like hazel pomaderris are fairly common in this zone. On the higher slopes sub-alpine species such as woollybutt and snowgum predominate, although myrtle beech is also common almost to the summit.

It contains a number of native mammals including the rare Leadbeater's possum, and is home to 120 species of native birds. Some examples include the pink robin, yellow-tailed black cockatoo, the crimson rosella and the rare lyrebird, heard to imitate chainsaws, motorbikes, and other species of birds.

The Mount Donna Buang wingless stonefly is endemic to the area. Mount Donna Buang is the type locality of the velvet worm Ooperipatus centunculus.

== History ==
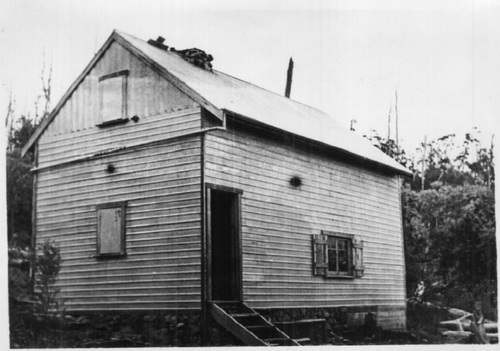
One of the ski lodges on Mt Donna Buang in the 1930s. Photo by Kath Magill.

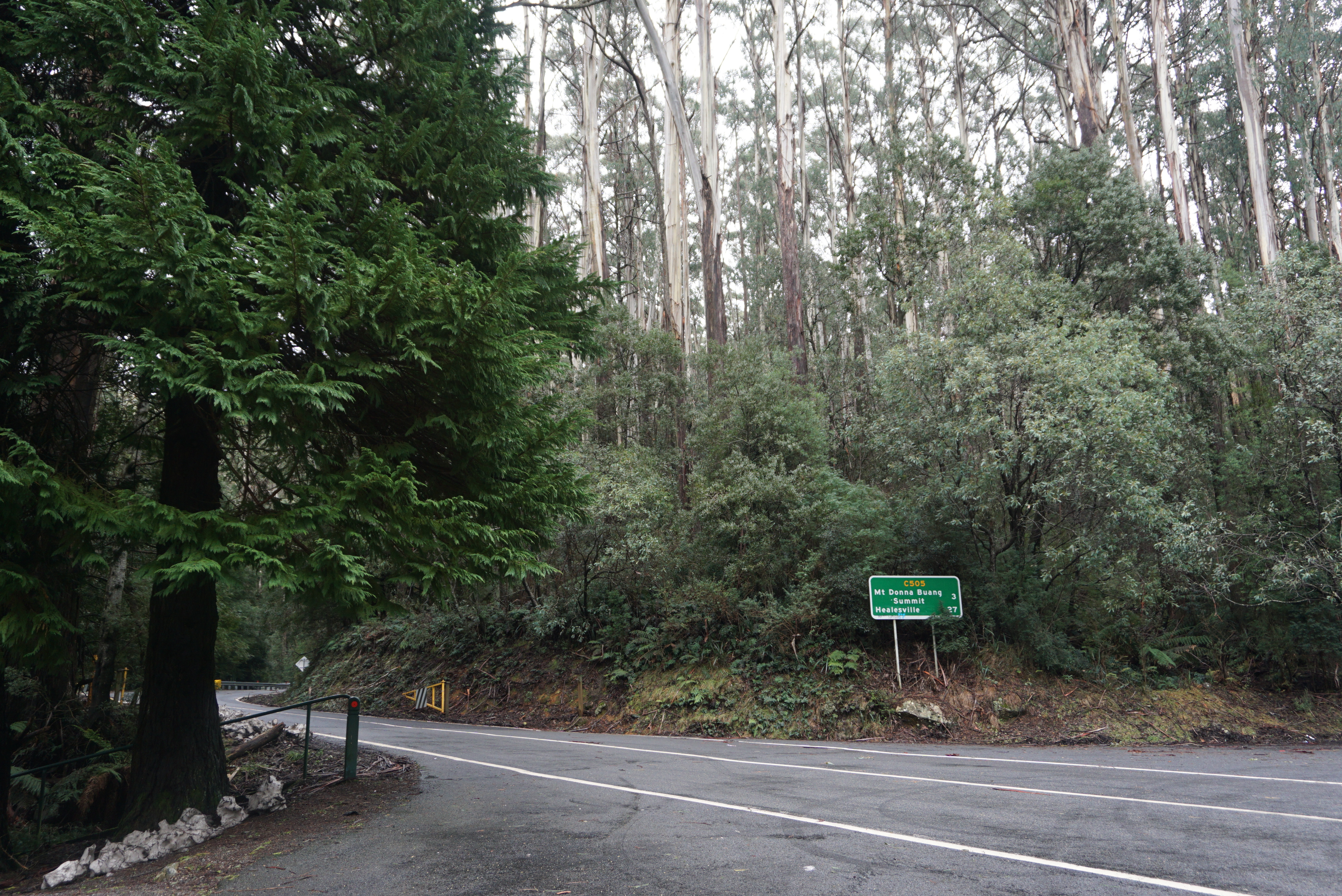
The road up to Mount Donna Buang

In the 1860s, “Mount Acland” was the name given to the 1,250-metre-high (4,100 ft) mountain by Joseph Anderson Panton CMG, a police magistrate based at Healesville Court House. The name it has today, “Mount Donna Buang”, probably came from the Wurundjeri.

A walking track to the summit of Mount Donna Buang was cut during the 1890s and the much wider Donna Buang Bridle Track, which the current road from Warburton to the top of Mount Donna Buang follows, was opened in 1912.

Federal government minister Lee Batchelor suffered a fatal heart attack while climbing Mount Donna Buang in 1911.

Timber from the mountain was harvested from the early 1900s to the mid-1920s with seven cable-hauled tramways moving logs from the Ben Cairn - Donna Buang ridge down to sawmills near Warburton. While the forest has regrown and the mountain appears to have never been logged, relics such as tram rails and cables can still be found in the forest.

From 1925 to the early 1950s Mt Donna Buang was a popular ski resort. It had four ski lodges, day visitor shelters, cafes, a ski hire, a ski jump and six runs cut through forests of myrtle beech and woollybutt. For over 20 years it had thousands of visitors every weekend there was snow. However, the runs were short and skiable snow cover was erratic, although a fairly common occurrence in winter, so after the Second World War, better transport meant it lost out to higher ski resorts further from Melbourne, although the mountain remained popular with family snow play groups. Today, skiable covers of snow are infrequent.

=== Cycling ===
The road from Warburton to Mount Donna Buang is a challenging cycling route, averaging a climb of 6.2% over 16.6 km and has also become a popular destination for recreational driving, motorcycling, and in the summer a challenging training route for endurance cyclists and triathletes.

The main public roads on Mt Donna Buang are:

- Donna Buang Road, sealed from Warburton to a bit past the Mount Donna Buang Summit Road junction.
- Acheron Way, joining Donna Buang Road about halfway up, leads to Marysville. It is sealed except for a 12-kilometre section in the middle.
- Don Road runs from Healesville to the Warburton Highway between Yarra Junction and Launching Place. It connects with Donna Buang Road, and is unsealed for much of its length.
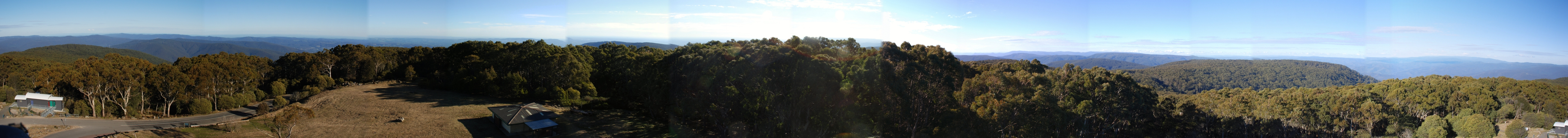
Panorama from summit of Mount Donna Buang

== See also ==
- Alpine National Park
- A Ski Trip to Donna Buang, 1935
