= Attorney General Gordon =

Attorney General Gordon may refer to:

- John Gordon (South Londonderry MP) (1849–1922), Attorney-General for Ireland
- John Hannah Gordon (1850–1923), Attorney-General of South Australia
- Thomas Gordon (lawyer) (1652–1722), Attorney General of New Jersey
- William Gordon (New Hampshire politician) (1763–1802), Attorney General of New Hampshire

== See also ==
- General Gordon (disambiguation)
