= Joseph Anderson Panton =

Scottish-born Australian magistrate and goldfields commissioner

Joseph Anderson Panton CMG
- Born: 2 June 1831; Aberdeenshire, Scotland
- Died: 25 October 1913 (aged 82); St Kilda, Melbourne, Victoria, Australia
- Burial place: St Kilda Cemetery
- Education: Scottish Naval and Military Academy
- Occupations: Police magistrate; warden; goldfields commissioner
- Years active: 1852–1890s
- Honours: Eremophila pantonii

Joseph Anderson Panton CMG (2 June 1831 – 25 October 1913) was a Scottish-born Australian magistrate and goldfields commissioner.

== Biography ==
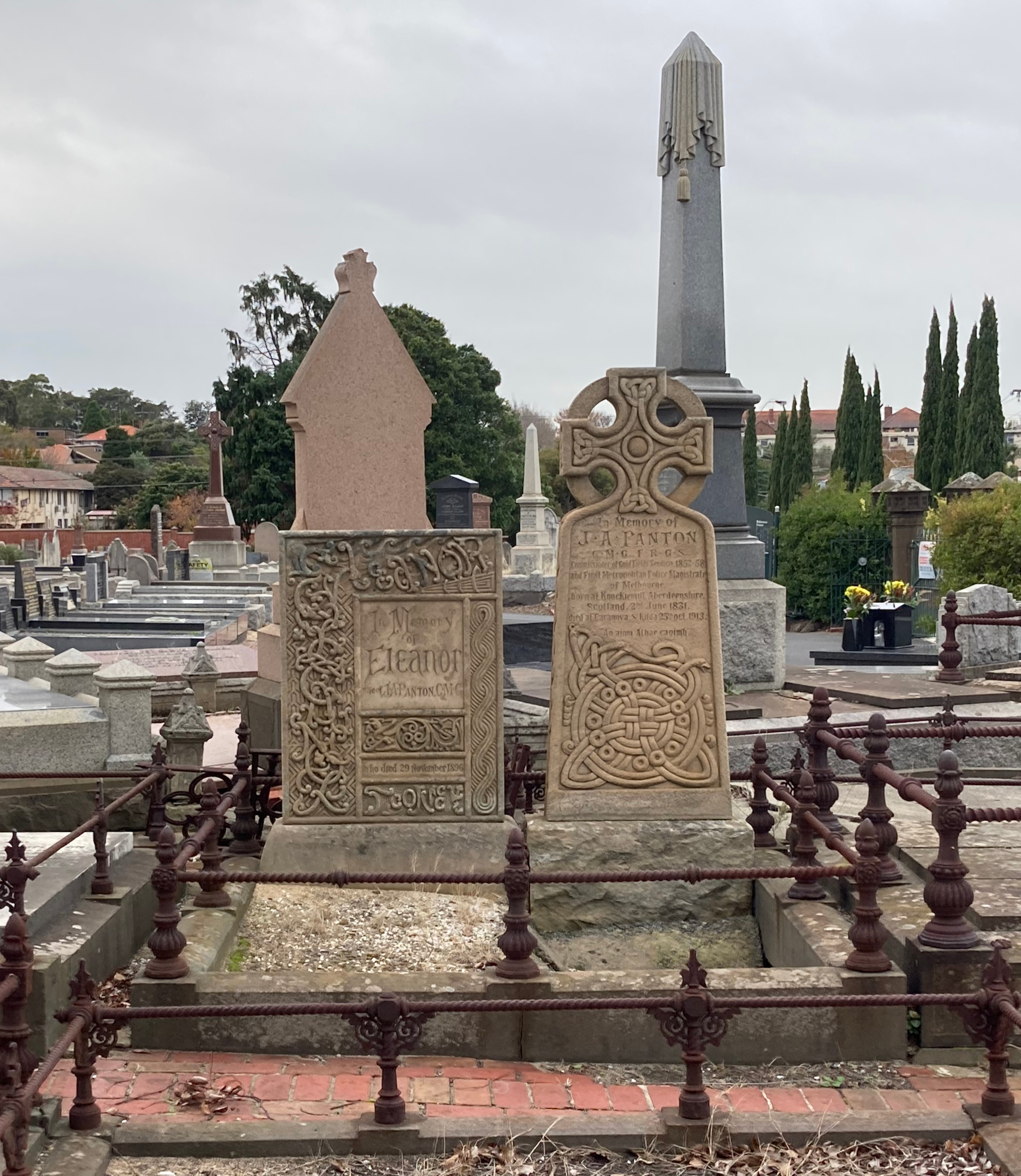
Panton's grave at St Kilda Cemetery

Panton was born in Knockiemil, Aberdeenshire, Scotland, the son of John Panton (of the Hudson's Bay Company service) and his wife Alexina McKay, née Anderson. Joseph Panton was educated at the Scottish Naval and Military Academy, developing an interest in drawing. He later studied geology amongst other subjects at the University of Edinburgh, but did not finish a degree.

Panton's uncle, Colonel Joseph Anderson, suggested that he migrate to Australia; Panton arrived in Sydney aboard the Thomas Arbuthnot in March 1851. He then went to the Port Phillip District. A year later he was senior assistant commissioner at Bendigo and then senior commissioner in 1854.

Panton investigated resentment against the Chinese gold-diggers and recommended a Chinese protectorate; this was adopted by Governor Charles Hotham in 1855. In 1890, Panton was appointed as the inaugural magistrate at the Healesville Court House and later served as the Chief Magistrate in Melbourne. Whilst in Healesville, Panton was credited with the mapping the Yarra Ranges and for naming Mount Donna Buang.

In 1895 Panton was appointed Companion of the Order of St Michael and St George (CMG). He died at St Kilda, Melbourne on 25 October 1913, and was buried at St Kilda Cemetery. He was survived by two daughters.

In 1882, the Victorian government botanist, Ferdinand von Mueller named a newly described plant from Western Australia, Eremophila pantonii in his honour.
