= Healesville Court House =

Heritage-listed former courthouse in Melbourne, Victoria, Australia

Healesville Court House (former)
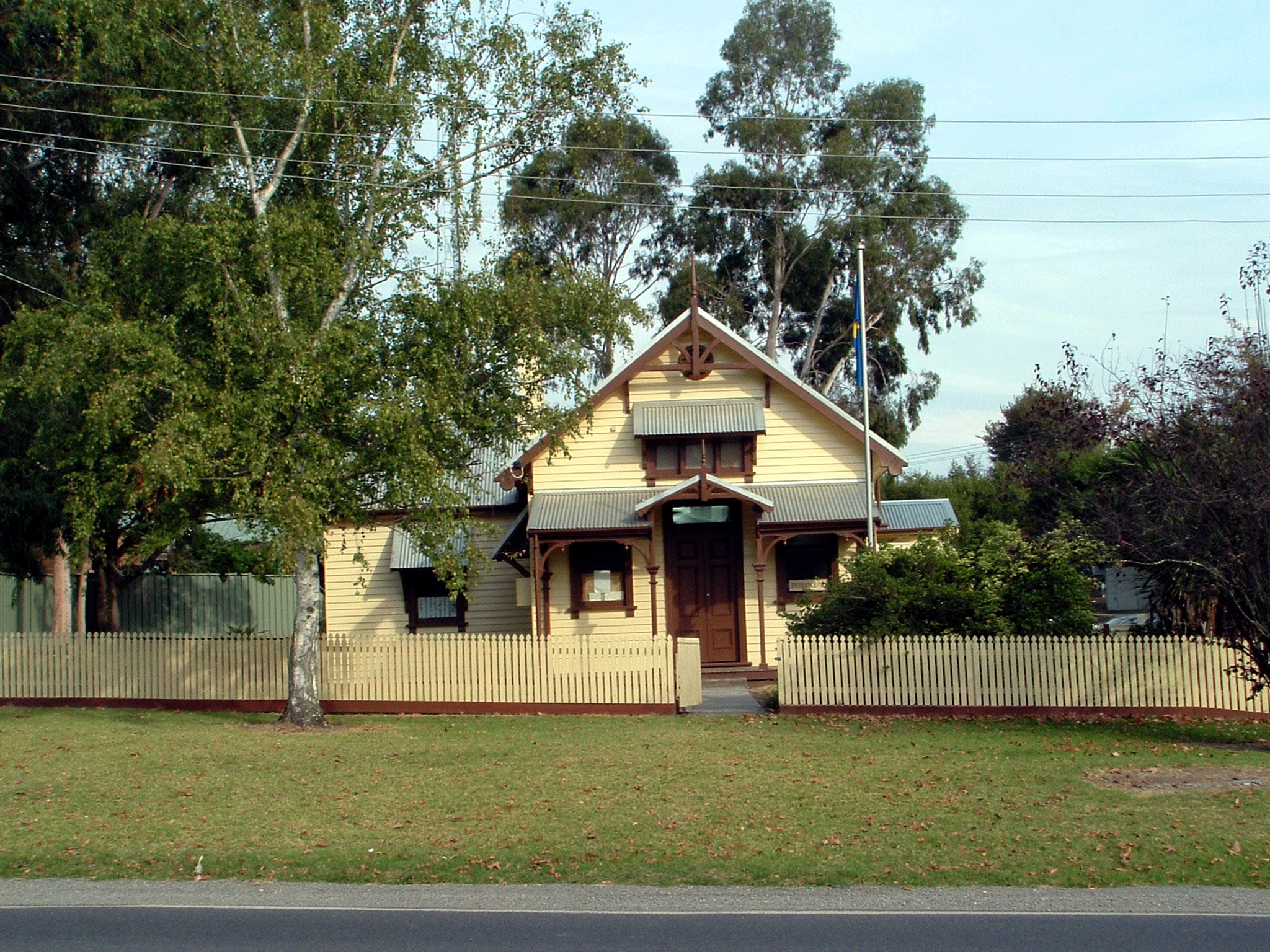
- The former court house in 2004

- Location of the former courthouse in Greater Metropolitan Melbourne

General information
- Status: Completed
- Type: Court house (former); Tourist information centre (current)
- Architectural style: Victorian Free Classical
- Location: 42 Harker Street, Healesville, Yarra Ranges, Melbourne, Victoria, Australia
- Coordinates: 37°39′22″S 145°30′38″E
- Year built: 1889–1890
- Completed: 1890; 136 years ago
- Closed: 1950 (as a court house)

Technical details
- Material: Timber

Design and construction
- Architect: John Thomas Kelleher
- Architecture firm: Victoria Public Works Department
- Main contractor: H. N. Hainer

Victorian Heritage Register
- Type: Registered place
- Designated: 18 April 1996
- Reference no.: H1171
- Heritage overlay no.: HO81
- Category: Law Enforcement

The Healesville Court House is a former courthouse located at 42 Harker Street in Healesville, in the Yarra Ranges, in the north eastern suburbs of Melbourne, in Victoria, Australia.

Built in 1890 on the traditional lands of the Wurundjeri people, the former courthouse was added to the Victorian Heritage Register on 18 April 1996 in recognition of its architectural and historical significance.

Closed as a court house in 1950, the building has been repurposed for community use, as the local tourist information centre.

== Description ==
The former Healesville Court House was constructed between 1889 and 1890 (Note: Although, one source states that the court house was completed in 1892.) by H. N. Hainer to a design by John Thomas Kelleher in the Victorian Free Classical style. The former court house is a timber building with hipped gable roof, trussed gables and a skillion front verandah.

In the late 1930s, renovations were completed to modernise the building and accommodate increasing administrative needs. However, in 1950, the building ceased use as a court house and commenced use as an historical and cultural site. During the 1970s, restoration efforts were initiated by the local historical societies, including the District Historical Society Inc. and the Lilydale & District Historical Society Inc., to preserve the building, leading to its heritage-listing in 1996.

The former Healesville Court House is architecturally significant as the most intact remaining example of a former group of five similar timber court houses constructed in the 1880s. The former Court House retains its original built-in furniture and demonstrates skilful design in its use of timber to achieve both picturesque qualities and a complex and ornamental porch verandah. The building is important as a work of the Public Works Department architect, John Thomas Kelleher, who was in charge of the Department's eastern district during the 1880s and designed many notable post offices and court houses.

The former Healesville Court House is of historical importance for its association with Joseph Anderson Panton CMG, the first magistrate of the court house and a prominent Victorian citizen. Panton owned a small house in Healesville and Panton's Gap was named after him. Panton, a warden and magistrate, was responsible for mapping the Yarra Ranges and naming Mount Donna Buang. Panton later became Chief Magistrate in Melbourne and actively maintained interests in the arts and viticulture.

== See also ==
- Architecture of Melbourne
- List of courthouses in Melbourne
- List of places on the Victorian Heritage Register in the Shire of Yarra Ranges
