= Thomas Edward Gordon =

Scottish soldier, diplomat, author and traveller

Sir Thomas Edward Gordon KCIE, KCB, CSI
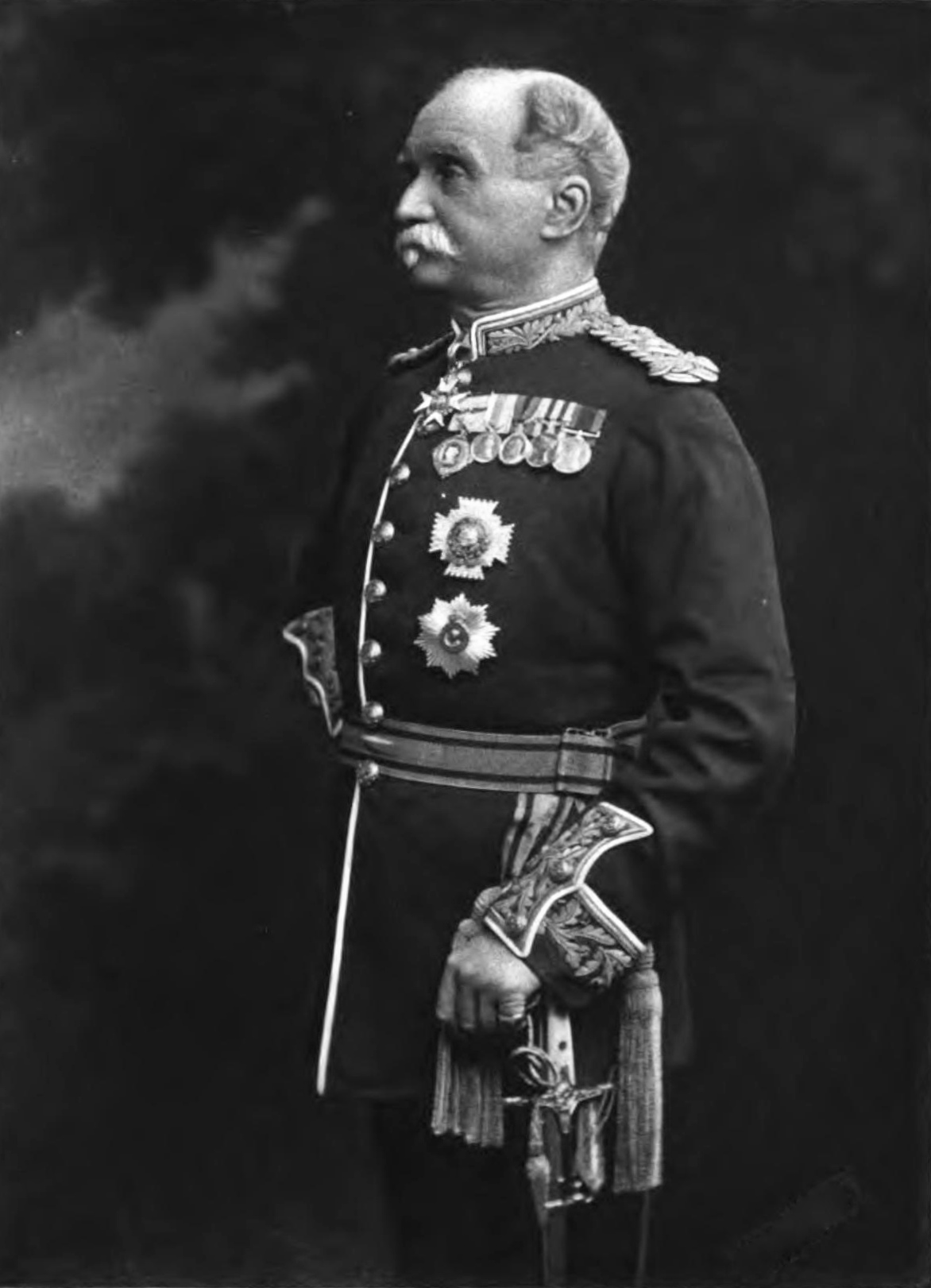
- Gen. T. E. Gordon, 1906
- Born: 12 January 1832
- Died: 23 March 1914 (aged 82); Kensington, London, England
- Burial place: Brompton Cemetery, London
- Education: Scottish Naval and Military Academy
- Spouses: Mary Helen Sawers (m. 1862; died 1879) Charlotte Davison (m. 1894–1914)
- Children: five
- Relatives: John James Hood Gordon, twin brother; Edward Strathearn Gordon, cousin
- Military career
- Allegiance: United Kingdom
- Service: British Army
- Service years: 1849–1894 (designated "unemployed supernumerary")
- Rank: General (honorary rank); Lieutenant General (highest rank in active duty)
- Other work: Author of three books

Sir Thomas Edward Gordon KCIE KCB CSI (12 January 1832 – 23 March 1914) was a Scottish soldier, diplomat, and traveller. A British Army officer, he fought in India, served as a diplomat in Tehran, and travelled across the Pamirs. He is primarily remembered as an author of several books about India, Persia (modern-day Iran), and Central Asia of the 19th century.

== Early life ==
Gordon was born on 12 January 1832 in Aberdeen and was a twin son of Captain William Gordon (1788–1834) of the 2nd Queen's Royal Regiment. His father had served in the Peninsular War and was married at Santarém, in 1818, to Marianna Carlotta Loi Gonçalves de Mello, daughter of Luiz Gonçalves de Mello, a Spanish government official in the province of Estremadura.

His father William Gordon was one of the sons of Adam Gordon (1750–1831) of Griamachary in the parish of Kildonan, Dingwall, whose sons and grandsons included thirteen commissioned officers, a Surgeon-General, Huntly George Gordon; and a Lord Advocate and MP, Edward Gordon, Baron Gordon of Drumearn.

He and his twin brother, Sir John James Hood Gordon, were the youngest children in a family of four sons and a daughter. The twins were educated at the Scottish Naval and Military Academy, Edinburgh. Thomas Edward and John joined the British Army on the same day; both became generals and were knighted.

== Army career ==
Alongside his twin brother, Thomas entered the British Army, joining the 29th (Worcestershire) Regiment of Foot on 21 August 1849. He transferred to the Army in India and served in the Indian Mutiny campaign of 1857–1858.

In 1873–1874, he participated in the Second Yarkand Mission led by Thomas Douglas Forsyth. The main goal of the expedition was to meet Yakub Beg, the ruler of Chinese Turkestan. Gordon also joined a party that travelled west to the Pamirs and Wakhan. Gordon was accompanied on the mission by John Biddulph, Ferdinand Stoliczka, Henry Walter Bellew, Henry Trotter, and R. A. Chapman. In 1876 Gordon published his account of the expedition.

In 1889 he became Oriental Secretary to the British Legation in Tehran and was Military Attaché, 1891–93. During his visits to Persia Gordon decided to publish an account of his journey with the intention of displaying, through his observations and illustrations, evidence of the "progress and improvement" he found. In 1896 his work, Persia Revisited, was published.

On 1 April 1894, he was promoted full general and placed on the Unemployed Supernumerary List of the Indian Staff Corps.

== Personal life ==
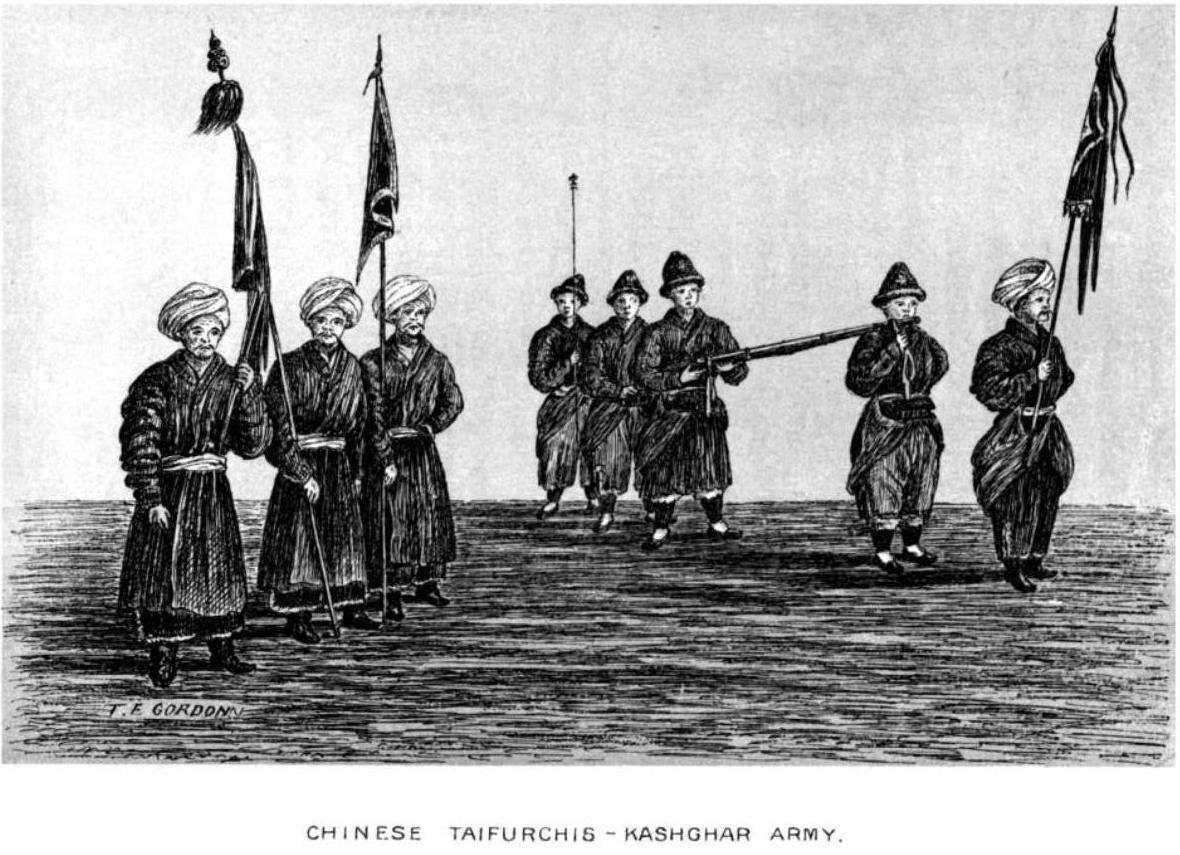
"Chinese Taifurchis" (gunners) in Kashgar, T.E. Gordon's drawing in The Roof of the World

In 1862, Gordon married firstly, Mary Helen Sawers, daughter of Alexander Sibbald Sawers. They had four daughters, Helen Elizabeth (1863–1942), Alexa Anna (9 January 1867 – 18 November 1867), Jeanetta (1876–1963), and Violet Mary (1878–1972), and a son who died in childhood, Thomas William Gordon (1868–1876).

Mary Helen died in 1879 and he married secondly in 1894, Charlotte Davison.

He was also a painter, perhaps the first European to paint the landscapes of certain remote locations of the Pamirs.

Gordon died in 1914 at his home in Kensington.

== Bibliography ==
- The roof of the world: being a narrative of a journey over the high plateau of Tibet to the Russian frontier and the Oxus sources on Pamir – includes an eyewitness account of Yaqub Beg's regime in Kashgaria
- Persia Revisited
- A varied life; a record of military and civil service, of sport and of travels in India, Central Asia and Persia, 1849–1902
