= Scottish Naval and Military Academy =

The Scottish Naval and Military Academy in Edinburgh was a private school which opened on 8 November 1825. It catered for boys intending to have a career with the Army, Navy or the East India Company. It closed in July 1858. It was re-formed as the Scottish Institute for Civil, Commercial and Military Education in October 1858 and closed around 1865.

Captain John Orr (1790-1879) was the superintendent of the Scottish Naval and Military Academy for thirty-three years from 1831, having fought with the Black Watch in the Peninsular War and was wounded at the Battle of Waterloo.

In 1829 the Academy moved into the three-storey building on Lothian Road opposite Castle Terrace, which it shared with the Royal Riding Academy. The building was demolished in the 1870s to make way for the Caledonian Railway Station.

A noted master at the Academy was James R. Ballantyne, later head master of the Sanskrit College in Benares (modern-day Varanasi), who from 1832 to 1845 taught "Persian, Hindoostanee and Arabic" from classical texts.

Sir Henry Yule was both a pupil and a master. He is famous for his dictionary of Anglo-Indian terms called Hobson-Jobson.

Another lecturer was William Swan, who taught mathematics and physics, and conducted some notable experiments at the Academy.

Other subjects taught were: Military Engineering: Fortifications, Military Drawing and Surveying; Drawing: Landscape and Perspective; Higher Mathematics; Navigation; Chemistry; Military Antiquities; Latin and Greek; Elementary Arithmetic and Book Keeping, Algebra and Geometry; Geography; Natural Philosophy and Navigation; History; Elocution; French, Italian, Spanish and Portuguese; Fencing, Gymnastics and Military Exercises with the Firelock and Broadsword.

== Some notable alumni ==
- John Cook, Scottish recipient of the Victoria Cross
- Joseph Anderson Panton, Goldfields Commissioner and artist in Victoria, Australia
- W. J. Macquorn Rankine, Scottish engineer and physicist
- John McDouall Stuart, Australian explorer
- Sir Henry Yule, Scottish Orientalist and geographer
